= 2025 King County Council election =

Washington local election

- November 4, 2025

5 of 9 seats on the King County Council Officially nonpartisan
	First party	Second party
Party	Democratic	Republican
Seats before	7	2
Seats after	7	2
- Party holds: Democratic hold Republican hold

The 2025 King County Council election was held on November 4, 2025, to elect five members to the King County Council. Primary elections were held on August 5, 2025. All incumbents held their seats.

== District 1 ==
As only one candidate filed to run, no primary election was held.

=== Candidates ===
==== Declared ====
- Rod Dembowski, incumbent councilor

==== Endorsements ====
Rod Dembowski

Labor unions

- King County Labor Council
- Service Employees International Union 775
- United Food and Commercial Workers Local 3000

Democratic party organizations

- King County Democrats
- Washington's 32nd legislative district Democrats
- Washington's 46th legislative district Democrats

Organizations

- Planned Parenthood Action Fund

=== General election ===
==== Results ====
General election results
Candidate	Votes	%
Rod Dembowski (incumbent)	58,640	98.45
Write-in	926	1.55
Total votes	59,566	100.00

== District 3 ==
As only two candidates filed to run, no primary election was held.

=== Candidates ===
==== Declared ====
- Sarah Perry, incumbent councilor
- Rob Wotton, businessman

==== Endorsements ====
Sarah Perry

Labor unions

- King County Labor Council
- United Food and Commercial Workers Local 3000

Democratic party organizations

- King County Democrats
- Washington's 48th legislative district Democrats

Organizations

- National Women's Political Caucus of Washington
- Planned Parenthood Action Fund

=== General election ===
==== Results ====
General election results
Candidate	Votes	%
Sarah Perry (incumbent)	48,114	68.05
Rob Wotton	22,438	31.74
Write-in	148	0.21
Total votes	70,700	100.00

== District 5 ==
=== Primary election ===
==== Candidates ====
===== Declared =====
- Ahmad Corner, entrepreneur
- Steffanie Fain, managing attorney
- Angela Henderson, bricklayer
- Peter Kwon, SeaTac city councilor
- Ryan McIrvin, Renton city councilor
- Kim-Khánh Văn, Renton city councilor

==== Endorsements ====
Steffanie Fain

U.S. Representatives

- Adam Smith, U.S. Representative from Washington's 9th congressional district (1997–present)
- Marilyn Strickland, U.S. Representative from Washington's 10th congressional district (2021–present)

Statewide officials

- Steve Hobbs, Secretary of State of Washington (2021–present) (co-endorsement with McIrvin)

Democratic party organizations

- Washington's 47th legislative district Democrats (co-endorsement with Văn)

Newspapers

- The Seattle Times
Peter Kwon

State legislators

- Cindy Ryu, state representative from the 32nd district (2011–present)

Democratic party organizations

- Washington's 30th legislative district Democrats (co-endorsement with Văn)
Ryan McIrvin

Statewide officials

- Steve Hobbs, Secretary of State of Washington (2021–present) (co-endorsement with Fain)

State legislators

- John Lovick, state senator from the 44th district (2021–present)

Democratic party organizations

- King County Democrats (co-endorsement with Văn)

Labor unions

- American Federation of Teachers Washington

Organizations

- King County Young Democrats
Kim-Khánh Văn

State legislators

- Mona Das, former state senator from the 47th district (2019–2023)
- Manka Dhingra, state senator from the 45th district (2017–present)
- Brandy Donaghy, state representative from the 44th district (2021–present)
- Mia Gregerson, state representative from the 33rd district (2013–present)
- Dawn Mason, former state representative from the 33rd district (1995–1999)
- Edwin Obras, state representative from the 33rd district (2024–present)
- Rebecca Saldaña, state senator from the 37th district (2016–present)
- Chris Stearns, Speaker pro tempore of the Washington House of Representatives (2025–present) from the 47th district (2022–present)
- Lisa Wellman, state senator from the 41st district (2017–present)

Local officials

- Teresa Mosqueda, King County Councilmember from the 8th district (2024–present)

Labor unions

- King County Labor Council

Democratic party organizations

- King County Democrats (co-endorsement with McIrvin)
- Washington's 30th legislative district Democrats (co-endorsement with Kwon)
- Washington's 33rd legislative district Democrats
- Washington's 47th legislative district Democrats (co-endorsement with Fain)

Organizations

- National Women's Political Caucus of Washington
- Planned Parenthood Action Fund

Newspapers

- The Stranger

==== Results ====
Nonpartisan primary
Candidate	Votes	%
Peter Kwon	8,146	28.34
Steffanie Fain	7,053	24.53
Kim-Khanh Van	6,397	22.25
Ryan McIrvin	3,351	11.66
Angela Henderson	2,029	7.06
Ahmad Corner	1,632	5.68
Write-in	140	0.49
Total votes	28,748	100.00

=== General election ===
==== Results ====
General election results
Candidate	Votes	%
Steffanie Fain	23,433	55.02
Peter Kwon	18,924	44.44
Write-in	230	0.54
Total votes	42,587	100.00

== District 7 ==
=== Primary election ===
==== Candidates ====
===== Declared =====
- Pahaliyah Brown, activist
- Pete von Reichbauer, incumbent councilor
- Maya Vengadasalam, former Kent school board director

==== Endorsements ====
Pete von Reichbauer

Newspapers

- The Seattle Times
Maya Vengadasalam

Newspapers

- The Stranger

==== Results ====
Nonpartisan primary
Candidate	Votes	%
Pete von Reichbauer (incumbent)	17,039	56.65
Maya Vengadasalam	7,905	26.28
Pahaliyah Brown	5,034	16.74
Write-in	100	0.33
Total votes	30,078	100.00

=== General election ===
==== Results ====
General election results
Candidate	Votes	%
Pete von Reichbauer (incumbent)	23,691	59.72
Maya Vengadasalam	15,846	39.95
Write-in	131	0.33
Total votes	39,668	100.00

== District 9 ==
As only two candidates filed to run, no primary election was held.

=== Candidates ===
==== Declared ====
- Jude Anthony, software developer
- Reagan Dunn, incumbent councilor

==== Endorsements ====
Jude Anthony

Democratic party organizations

- King County Democrats

Organizations

- 314 Action
Reagan Dunn

Organizations

- Mainstream Republicans of Washington

=== General election ===
==== Results ====
General election results
Candidate	Votes	%
Reagan Dunn (incumbent)	46,769	69.44
Jude Anthony	20,375	30.25
Write-in	207	0.31
Total votes	67,351	100.00
