= 2025 King County, Washington Proposition 1 =

- April 22, 2025
- Property Tax Levy for Regional Automated Fingerprint Identification System Measure

Results
Choice	Votes	%
Yes	151,495	59.72%
No	102,189	40.28%
Valid votes	253,684	100.00%
Invalid or blank votes	0	0.00%
Total votes	253,684	100.00%
Registered voters/turnout	1,424,836	17.8%

King County Proposition 1 is a legislatively referred ballot measure appeared on ballots sent to King County, Washington voters, and was due by April 22, 2025. It was approved for the ballot after being passed by the King County Council.

The measure was approved by voters, passing with 59% in favor.

== Background ==
The measure approved a seven-year property tax, beginning in 2026, to fund operation of the Regional Automated Fingerprint Identification System, an automated fingerprint identification system (AFIS) that stores fingerprint records and identifies fingerprints from various crimes. The first of these computers was installed in 1988, and approved by voters in 1986. The database contains the fingerprints of over two million fingerprints, over one million palm prints, and over sixty-three thousand crime scene prints from unsolved records.

A similar measure was approved by voters in 2018, with a higher tax rate than this one, though it expired in late 2024. The tax would add $0.0275 per $1,000 of assessed property value.

There was no opposition statement submitted to King County Elections.

== Campaign ==
Police departments held demonstrations of the AFIS in support of the measure.

== Endorsements ==
Yes

Local officials

- Pete von Reichbauer, incumbent King County Councilor for the 7th district

Organizations

- The Seattle Times
No

Local officials

- Reagan Dunn, incumbent King County Councilor

Organizations

- The Stranger
