= Chris Vance =

Chris Vance is the name of:

- Chris Vance (politician) (born 1962), American Republican politician
- Chris Vance (actor) (born 1971), English actor
