= Dwight Pelz =

American politician (born 1951)

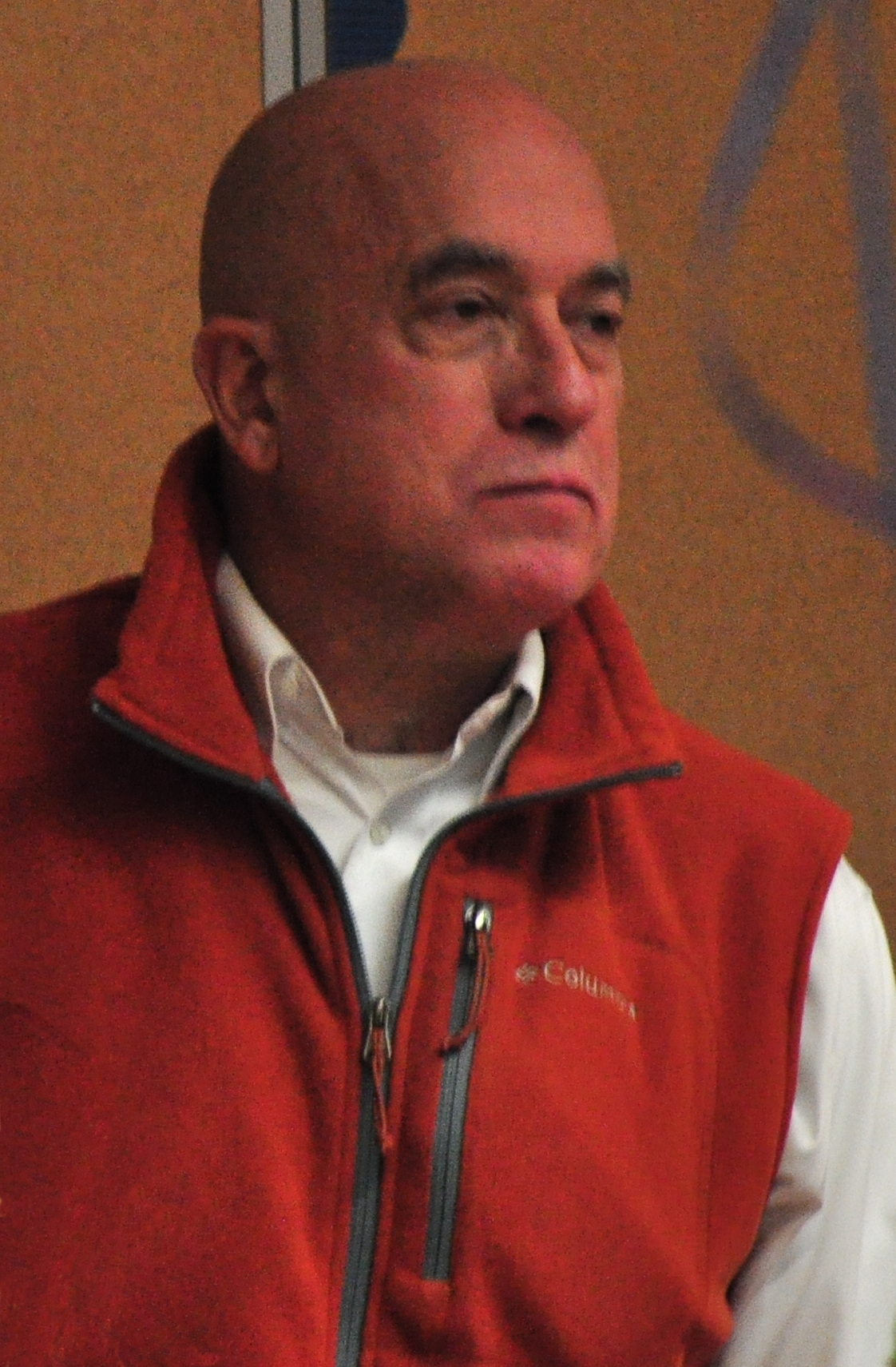

Chair of the Washington Democratic Party
- In office January 28, 2006 – February 1, 2014
- Preceded by: Paul Berendt
- Succeeded by: Jaxon Ravens

Member of the King County Council from the 5th district
- In office January 15, 1997 – January 1, 2006
- Preceded by: Ron Sims
- Succeeded by: Julia Patterson

Member of the Washington Senate from the 37th district
- In office January 14, 1991 – January 13, 1997
- Preceded by: George Fleming
- Succeeded by: Adam Kline

Personal details
- Born: April 1, 1951 (age 75) Seattle, Washington, U.S.
- Party: Democratic

Dwight Pelz (born April 1, 1951) is an American politician who served as the Chair of the Washington State Democratic Party from 2006 to 2014. He previously served in the Washington State Senate from the 37th district from 1991 to 1997 and on the King County Council from the 5th district from 1997 to 2006.
