= Bill Reams =

American politician (1933–2020)

Member of the Washington House of Representatives from the 48th district
- In office January 11, 1993 – January 11, 1999
- Preceded by: Roy A. Ferguson
- Succeeded by: Luke Esser

Chair of the King County Council
- In office January 1, 1975 – January 1, 1976
- Preceded by: Tom Forsythe
- Succeeded by: Bernice Stern

Member of the King County Council from the 3rd district
- In office May 1, 1969 – January 1, 1990
- Preceded by: Constituency established
- Succeeded by: Brian Derdowski

Personal details
- Born: May 7, 1933 Seattle, Washington, U.S.
- Died: June 6, 2020 (aged 87)
- Party: Republican

William H. Reams (May 7, 1933 – June 6, 2020) was an American politician who served as a member of the King County Council from 1969 to 1990. A member of the Republican Party, he represented the 3rd district.
