= Senator Pullen =

Senator Pullen may refer to:

- Albert J. Pullen (1861–1937), Wisconsin State Senate
- Kent Pullen (1942–2003), Washington State Senate
