= Bob Gaines (politician) =

American politician

Member of the King County Council from the 9th district
- In office January 1, 1977 – January 1, 1978
- Preceded by: Dave Mooney
- Succeeded by: Gary Grant

Member of the Washington House of Representatives from the 30th district
- In office January 8, 1973 – January 8, 1979
- Preceded by: Paul Barden
- Succeeded by: Robert D. Eberle

Personal details
- Party: Democratic

Robert Gaines is an American politician who served as a member of the King County Council from 1977 to 1978. A member of the Democratic Party, he represented the 9th district.
