= Paul Barden =

Paul Barden may refer to:

- Paul Barden (Gaelic footballer)
- Paul Barden (politician)
