= Ruby Chow =

American politician (1920–2008)

Chair of the King County Council
- In office January 1, 1979 – January 1, 1982
- Preceded by: Bernice Stern
- Succeeded by: Lois North

Member of the King County Council from the 5th district
- In office January 1, 1974 – January 1, 1986
- Preceded by: John T. O'Brien
- Succeeded by: Ron Sims

Personal details
- Born: Mar Seung-gum; June 6, 1920 Seattle, Washington, U.S.
- Died: June 4, 2008 (aged 87) Seattle, Washington, U.S.
- Spouse: Edward Shui "Ping" Chow
- Children: 5 Edward Chow Jr; Shelton Chow; Cheryl Chow; Brien Chow; Mark Chow
- Occupation: Politician; restaurateur

Ruby Chow (June 6, 1920 – June 4, 2008; Chinese: 周馬雙金; Jyutping: zau1 maa5 soeng1 gam1; pinyin: Zhōu Mǎ Shuāngjīn) was a Chinese American restaurateur and politician in Seattle, Washington. In 1974, she became the first and initially the only Asian American elected to the King County Council and served until her retirement in 1986.

== Early life ==
Chow was born Mar Seung-gum, on June 6, 1920, in Seattle to Jim Sing Mar and Wong See. Her parents were Chinese immigrants: Mar was from Hoi Yuen, Guangdong and moved to the U.S. to build railroads, later managing the San Juan Fishing and Canning Company dock in downtown Seattle. This was part of Seattle's first Chinatown, where many dock and cannery workers lived. Chow was born on a fishing dock there with the help of a midwife.

Chow was the oldest of three sisters and had seven brothers. Her family moved to Seattle's second and third Chinatown as they were established. She attended Bailey Gatzert Elementary, Washington Junior High, and Garfield and Franklin High.

When Chow was 12, her father died. It was the depths of the Great Depression, and the family struggled to get food. See worked three jobs and was ostracized for her family's poverty, which made a lasting impression on Chow. Chow dropped out of high school at 16 to help support the family. She started waiting tables for two dollars a day.

At 17, Chow moved to New York and worked as a waitress at the Howdy Club, a gay bar. See died in 1939.

== Career ==
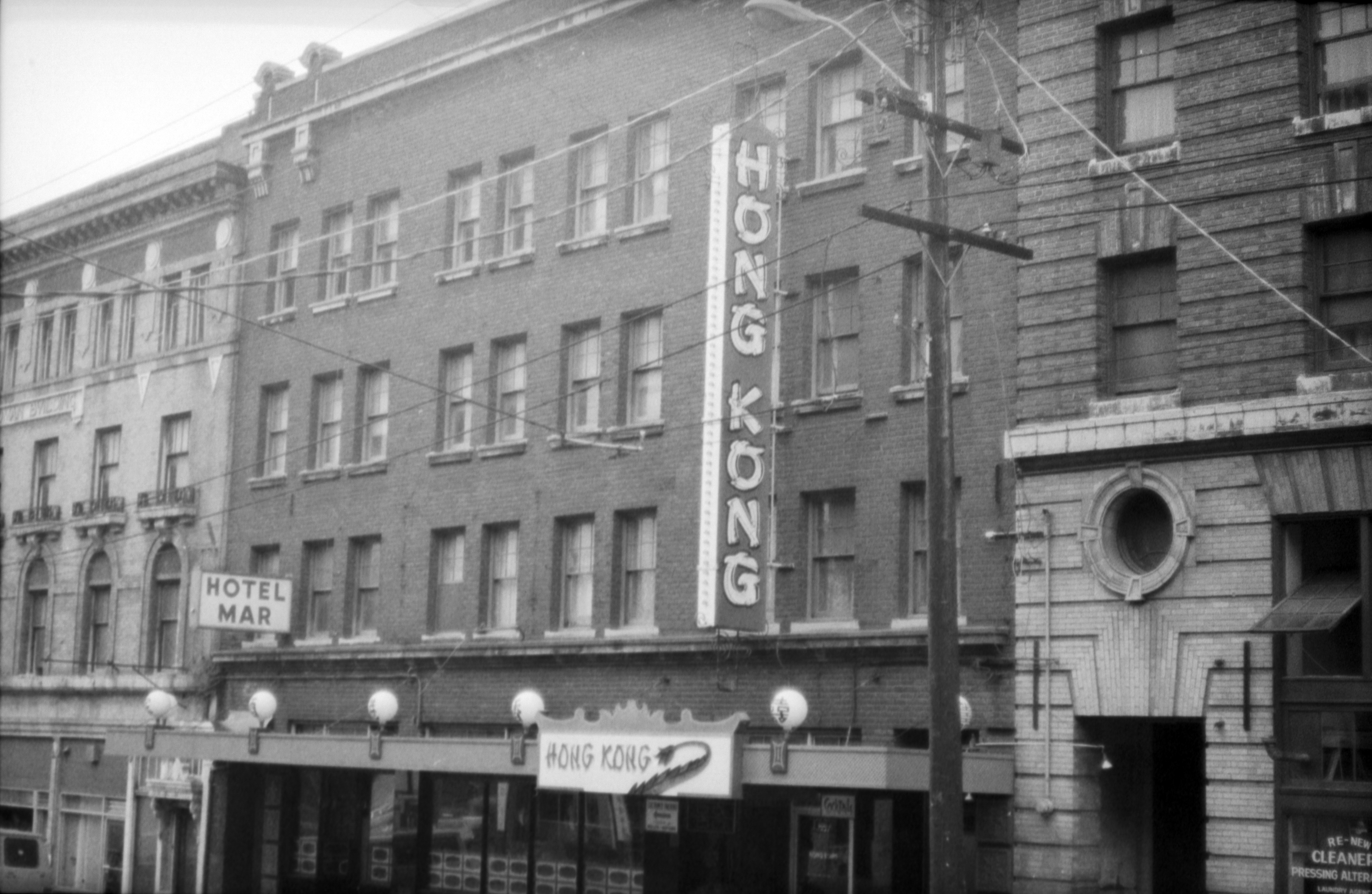
Hong Kong Restaurant in 1975

Chow and her second husband, Ping Chow, moved to Seattle in 1943. Ruby was inspired to move by a vision of her mother asking her to return home and help her family. The Chows lived in Seattle's third Chinatown, and both worked at the Hong Kong Restaurant, with Ruby waitressing and Ping cooking. Ruby was a popular waitress, particularly among white customers.

=== Ruby Chow's Restaurant ===
The Chows opened Ruby Chow's Restaurant in 1948 at 1122 Jefferson Street (at the corner of Broadway & Jefferson) in Seattle's First Hill neighborhood. It was the first Chinese restaurant outside of Seattle's Chinatown. Ping cooked and Ruby was the hostess. Ping was a famous Cantonese opera star, and he performed at the restaurant after closing time at 2 a.m.

Ruby Chow's was the first upscale Chinese restaurant in Seattle and became a quick success, serving as the unofficial local gathering spot for the Democratic Party. CEOs and journalists frequented the restaurant, and celebrities like Sammy Davis Jr. and Sidney Poitier visited. As hostess, Chow was memorable with her beehive hairdo, but she was also able to fit in with her clientele and enter the conversations of her powerful male customers. Chow also rented the attic of the restaurant to Bruce Lee, who worked in her restaurant for four years. Chow let Lee stay in exchange for working in the restaurant, but she clashed with Lee over work, and later over his choice to teach martial arts to Black students.

The Chows retired from their restaurant in 1979 when they leased it to a new business.

=== Advocacy ===
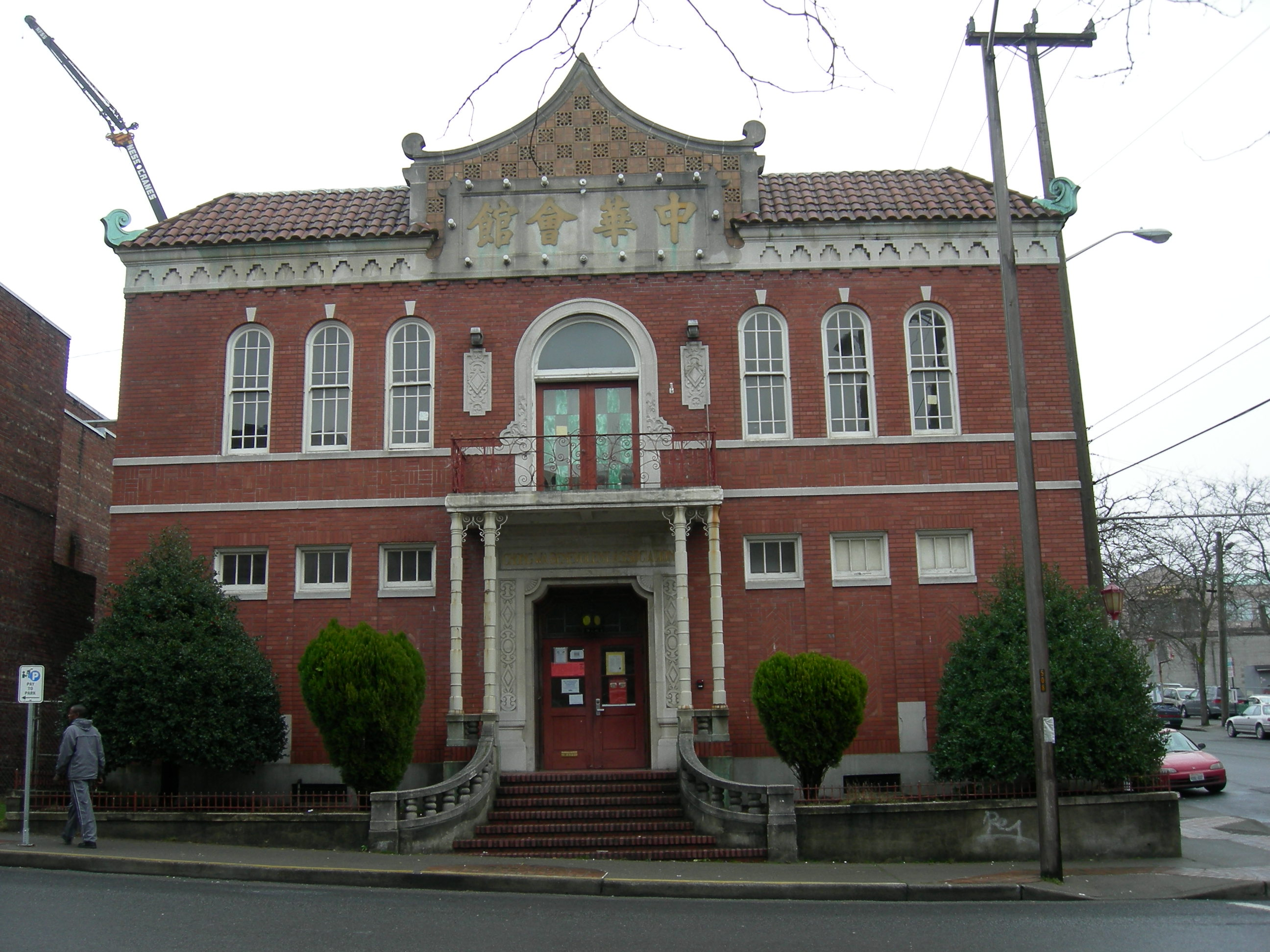
Chong Wa Benevolent Association building in Seattle

Chow wanted to improve relations between white and Chinese American residents of Seattle, increasing white people's understanding of Chinese culture and thus decreasing their fear of the local Chinese American community. She spoke to the Chong Wa Benevolent Association, which supported Chinese immigrants in Seattle, about starting a public relations campaign for the local Chinese American community. Chong Wa was run by men but appointed Chow as their public relations chair. Chow pushed many local organizations to integrate, including the Seafair Queen pageant, Pacific Northwest Bell, and government and school boards. In another approach, Chow and her husband appeared on local TV shows to share Chinese cooking, including hosting their own show for two years on KSTW-TV. They also published recipes from their restaurant.

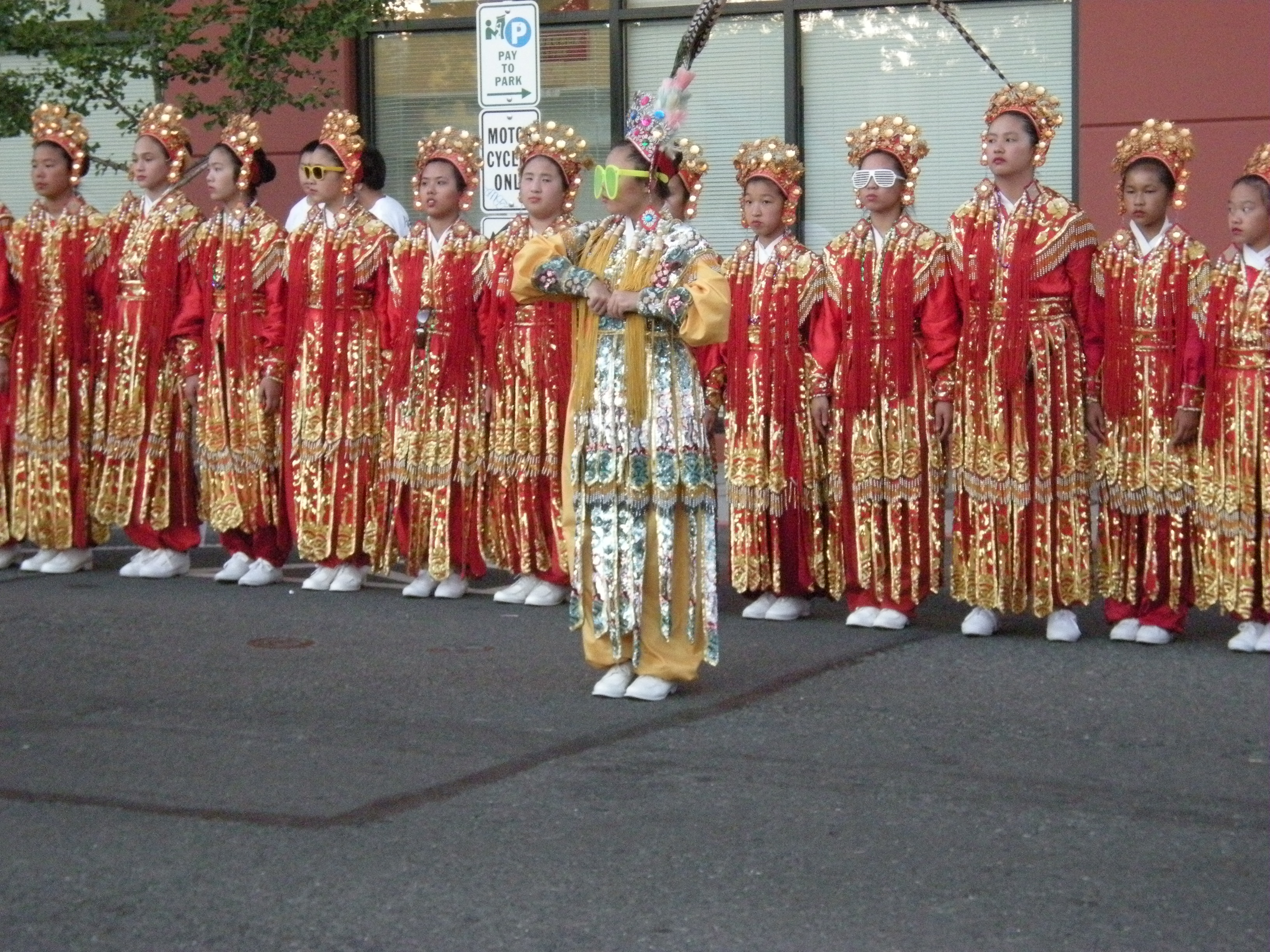
Drill team at the 2008 Seafair Chinatown Parade

In 1952, Ruby Chow helped found the Seattle Chinese Community Girls Drill Team after she and high school members of the Chi-ettes saw other Chinese American girls drill teams perform at local events. Chow hoped the team would produce cultural pride, better community relations, and empower young women in the Chinese American community, many of whom had severely restricted options for extracurricular activities due to gender and cultural expectations at the time. Chow recruited Ted Yerabek, a member of the Seattle Police Department's drill team, as the group's instructor. Chow led the team herself as its director, and obtained the sponsorship of Chong Wa. Ping Chow, Ruby Chow's husband, designed costumes taking inspiration from the women warriors represented in Cantonese opera. Ruby Chow had the team perform the gin-lai, single bow, at the end of performances to honor reviewers. The team performed yearly at Seafair parades and traveled across the country for competitions, winning many awards over decades. Chow's daughter Cheryl competed with the team and eventually succeeded Yerabek as its instructor, volunteering with them for 50 years.

Chow was elected to the Chong Wa board in 1957, becoming the first woman in the world to sit on the board of a chapter of the Chinese Consolidated Benevolent Association. She was elected president of Chong Wa in 1975, likewise becoming the first woman to hold that position.

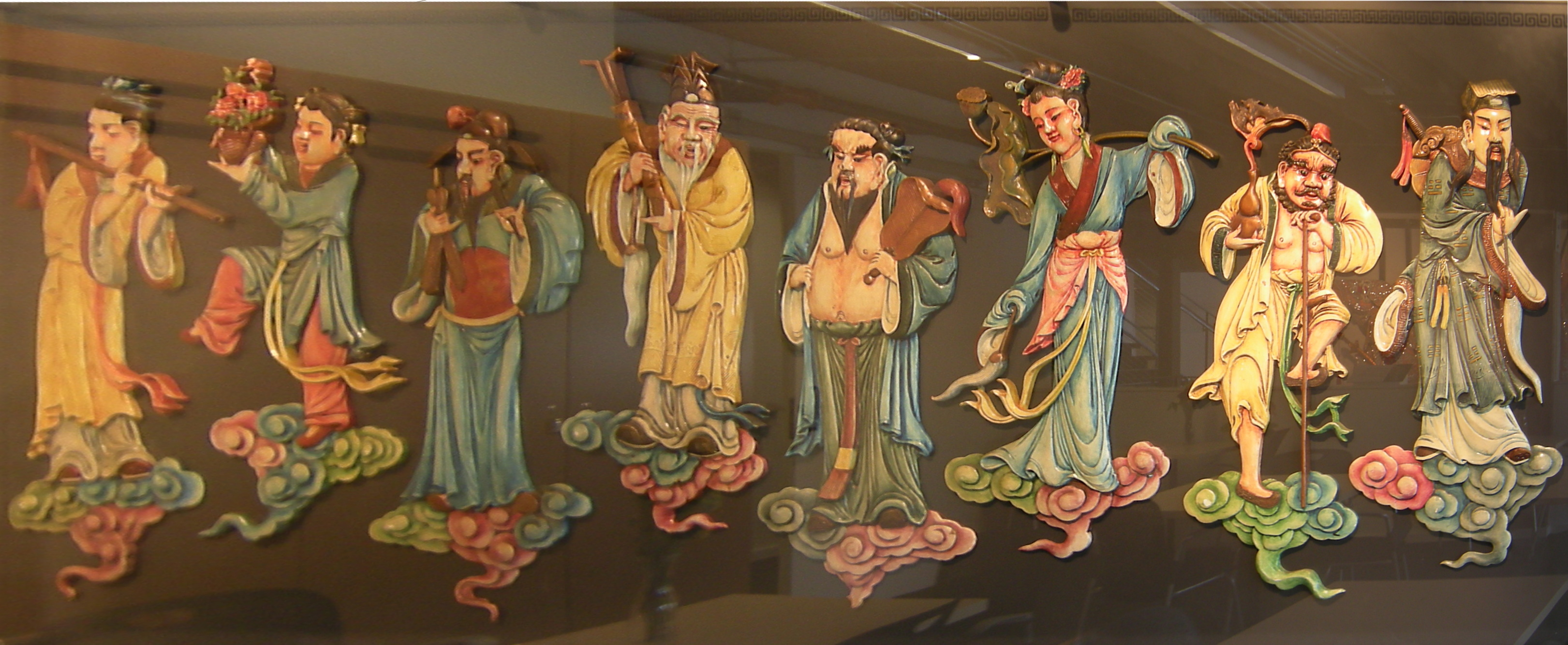
The Eight Immortals, a piece owned by Ruby and Ping Chow before they donated it to the Wing Luke Museum.

Chow raised funds to help create the Wing Luke Museum in the 1960s, continuing her involvement as a donor.

=== Politics ===
Chow leveraged her resources as a restaurant owner and community organizer to help get Wing Luke elected to the Seattle City Council in 1962 by having all the Chinese restaurants print "It's wise to vote for Wing Luke" as their fortune cookie fortunes.

Chow was a member of Seattle's Citizens Waterfront Task Force, formed after the city faced intense criticism in 1970 over its plans for a new waterfront park. The commission was convened to gather the feedback of a more representative group of community members and this became one of Seattle's first instances of community input into a public planning process.

In 1971, King County Executive John Spellman appointed Chow to the Board of Equalization and Appeals. He later stated that he chose her because he and many others knew Chow, and she was a leader in the community. Two years later, Chow helped free 75 Chinese Americans arrested for gambling during a Chinese New Year raid by the Seattle Police Department. Chow visited the mayor of Seattle and questioned how race was a factor in the arrests. She got all of the arrested children and elderly people released from jail and fundraised bail money for the rest, while ensuring people were only given tickets for the situation.

Chow's political career started in 1973 when she decided to run for King County Council as a Democrat. She had an encounter with Ted Bundy (later known to be a serial killer) who, as a GOP campaign worker, tried to convince Chow, unsuccessfully, to go Republican. She stayed with the Democratic Party and ran for the District 5 seat previously occupied by Republican John T. O’Brien, winning the seat by 220 votes against Black activist Walter Hubbard Jr.

Chow served three terms as a King County councilwoman in Washington. She was the first Asian American elected to King County Council, the first person of color, and the second woman, after Bernice Stern. Chow later won re-election against another Black activist, Garcia Massingale, and later Massingale and Ron Sims. She was elected Vice-Chair of the council in 1978, and she won Chair in 1979. She retired after her third term in 1985, and Sims followed her as District 5 councilmember, although Chow's daughter Cheryl Chow also ran for the seat.

On the council, Chow advocated to add bus stops and tennis courts to the South End, which often was under-resourced compared to North Seattle. She also helped start bilingual programs in Seattle Public Schools. She was an advocate for maintaining the name and identity of "Chinatown" for the Chinatown-International District (CID) neighborhood. This led her to clash with activists like Bob Santos, who viewed the "International District" identity as a collaboration across different Asian American communities.

In 1979, Spellman proposed to remodel the U.S. Immigration and Naturalization Service Building, located near the CID, into a work-release facility for up to 300 people. Chow visited Senator Warren Magnuson in Washington D.C. to lobby against the change on behalf of CID residents, who were upset that undesirably-viewed facilities were planned near their neighborhood. Her trip received major press attention and the proposal was discarded.

Chow mentored local politicians like Gary Locke and Ron Sims.

== Honors ==
The county council named Ruby Chow Park, at the corner of S. Albro Place and 13th Avenue S. near Boeing Field, after Chow in 1985. The 8th floor of the King County Administration Building is also named after Chow.

The Wing Luke Museum has a Ping and Ruby Chow & Family Gathering Space and Learning Studio dedicated to the Chows.

== Personal life ==
Chow had two sons with her first husband. Her second husband was Edward Shui "Ping" Chow (November 5, 1916 - June 29, 2011), who received U.S. citizenship after he was discharged from United States Army. Chow had five children. Chow's children are Edward Chow Jr, Shelton Chow, Cheryl Chow, Brien Chow, and Mark Chow.

Chow's daughter, Cheryl Chow, served as a member of the Seattle City Council from 1990 to 1997. Chow's son, Mark Chow, is a judge in King County District Court in Washington. He is the first Asian-American in the State of Washington to win election as a judge.

Chow's niece, Angie Mar, is the chef/owner of The Beatrice Inn in Manhattan's West Village.

=== Death ===
Chow died on June 4, 2008, aged 87, from heart failure in Seattle. Chow was survived by her five children and her husband, Edward Shui "Ping" Chow.

== See also ==
- Dolores Sibonga
- Donnie Chin
- Fujimatsu Moriguchi
- Liem Tuai
- Maria Hines
- Rose Ann Finkel
- Velma Veloria
