= Adam Kline =

American politician

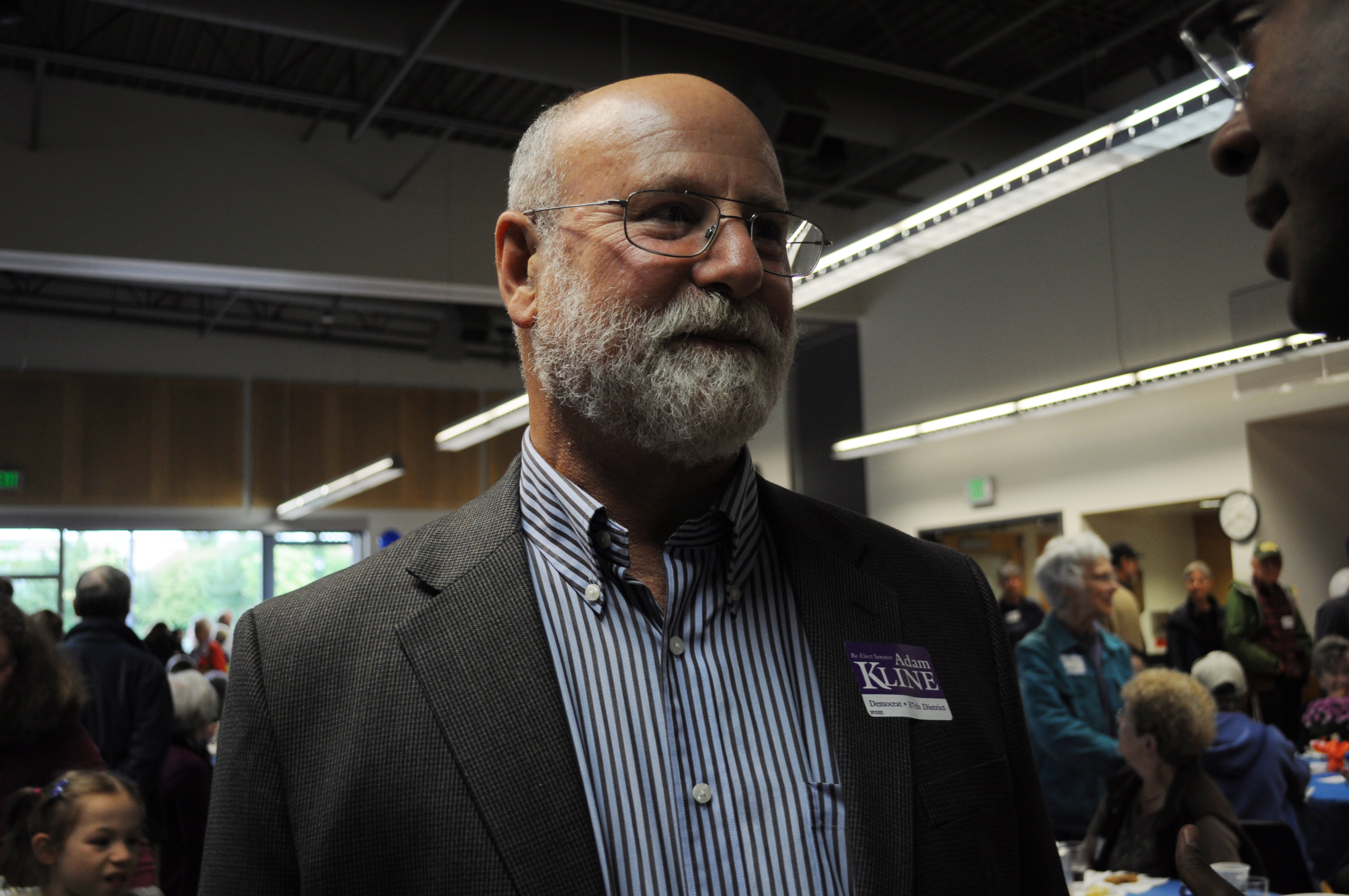

Member of the Washington Senate from the 37th district
- In office January 20, 1997 – January 12, 2015
- Preceded by: Dwight Pelz
- Succeeded by: Pramila Jayapal

Personal details
- Born: Adam Daniel Kline; October 27, 1944 (age 82) Red Bank, New Jersey, U.S.
- Party: Democratic
- Spouses: Desire Plumb (m. 1972; sep. 1979); Laura Gene Middaugh (m. 1989)
- Website: Senate homepage

Adam Daniel Kline (born October 27, 1944) is an American politician who was the State Senator for Washington's 37th district, comprising part of South Seattle, six precincts in Renton and two in Tukwila. He served the 37th District for more than 17 years. He chaired the Senate Judiciary Committee and was a member of the Government Operations and Elections Committee and the Rules Committee.

Before entering law school, Kline worked as a merchant seaman and as a newspaper reporter. He is a veteran of the Civil Rights Movement. He worked for SNCC in Greenwood, Mississippi, during the 1964 Freedom Summer and, after law school, returned to Greenwood in 1972 to work for North Mississippi Rural Legal Services.

In January 2010, Kline sponsored SB 6396 which attempted to ban assault rifles and pistols. In February 2013, Kline sponsored SB 5737 which would allow police to conduct warrantless searches in the homes of gun owners once per year, with a punishment of up to one year in jail for citizens who did not comply. Kline later stated he had not closely read the bill and had made a mistake. Media reports noted the inspection provision was present in Kline's bills SB 6396 (2010) and SB 5475 (2005) as written by the Brady Campaign and the San Francisco-based Law Center to Prevent Gun Violence.

Kline practiced law for 32 years before retiring in 2004 to work for the Laborers Union. He was a cooperating attorney with the ACLU and is active with NARAL Pro-Choice America and Washington Conservation Voters.

In 1972, Kline married Desire Plumb, with whom he had one child, Genevieve Amanda Kline. He and Desire parted in 1979, and, in 1989, he married Laura Gene Middaugh, who serves as a judge on the King County Superior Court.
