= Lorraine Hine =

American politician (born 1930)

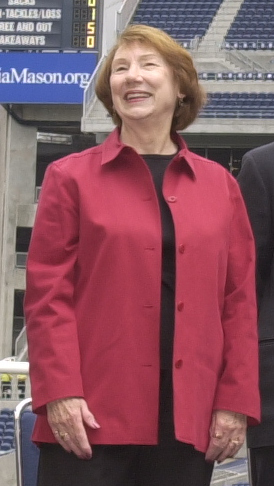
- Lorraine Hine, 2002

Member of the Washington House of Representatives for the 33rd district
- In office January 12, 1981 – January 13, 1993
- Preceded by: Russell A. Austin, Jr.
- Succeeded by: Julia Patterson

Personal details
- Born: May 1, 1930 (age 96) Timber Lake, South Dakota, United States
- Party: Democratic
- Children: 6
- Occupation: Politician

Lorraine Ann Hine (born May 1, 1930) is an American former politician in the state of Washington. She served the 33rd district in the Washington House of Representatives from 1981 to 1993. She resigned from her seat on January 13, 1993, to become the legislative director for Governor Mike Lowry.
