= Lois North =

American politician (1921–2025)

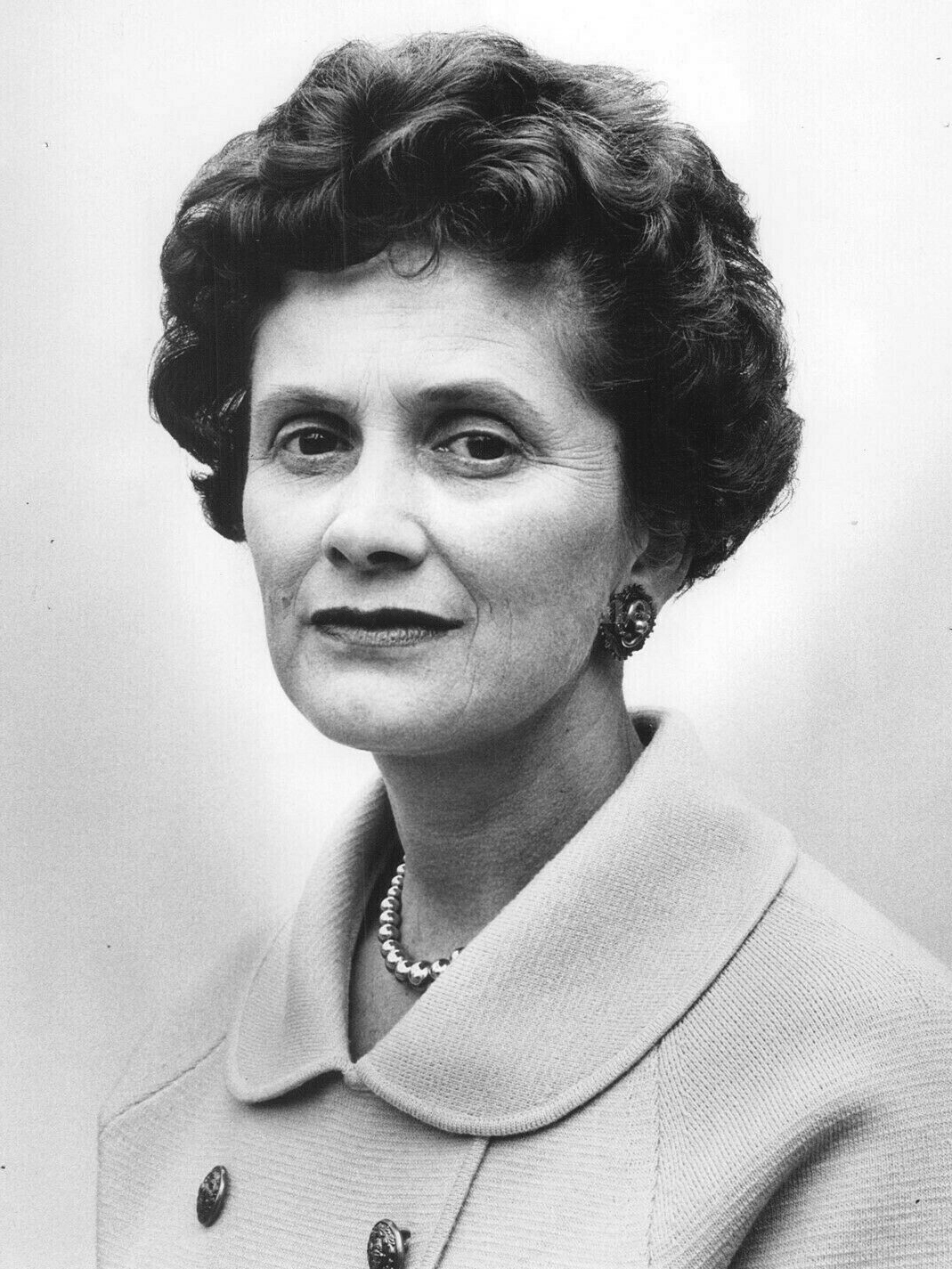
- North in 1961

Chair of the King County Council
- In office January 1, 1990 – January 1, 1992
- Preceded by: Gary Grant
- Succeeded by: Audrey Gruger
- In office January 1, 1982 – January 1, 1984
- Preceded by: Ruby Chow
- Succeeded by: Gary Grant

Member of the King County Council from the 4th district
- In office January 1, 1980 – January 1, 1992
- Preceded by: Bernice Stern
- Succeeded by: Larry Phillips

Member of the Washington Senate from the 44th district
- In office January 13, 1975 – December 31, 1979
- Preceded by: Ted G. Peterson
- Succeeded by: Bruce A. Bradburn

Member of the Washington House of Representatives from the 44th district
- In office January 13, 1969 – January 13, 1975
- Preceded by: Lon F. Backman
- Succeeded by: Donn Charnley

Personal details
- Born: Lois Esther Hiester; November 23, 1921 Berkeley, California, U.S.
- Died: September 20, 2025 (aged 103) Seattle, Washington, U.S.
- Party: Republican
- Spouse: Douglass North (m. 1944; div. 1972)

Lois Esther North (née Hiester; November 23, 1921 – September 20, 2025) was an American politician in the state of Washington. A Republican, North served in the Washington House of Representatives for the 44th district between 1969 and 1975 and the Washington State Senate from the 44th district between 1975 and 1979.

Born in Berkeley, California, she attended the University of California, Berkeley and Columbia University. While studying at UC Berkeley, she met Douglass C. North, whom she married in 1944. She worked as a teacher before the couple moved to Seattle, Washington, where she became involved with the League of Women Voters after the birth of their children. She led the effort to redistrict the state legislature in 1962, although the ballot measure she drafted ultimately was rejected by the voters. North also served on the King County commission that drafted the new county charter that was approved by voters in 1968.

North was first elected to the Washington House of Representatives in 1968, where she worked to pass environmental legislation. A moderate, pro-choice Republican, she sponsored a bill to reform abortion policy, which led to its legalization through Initiative 20 in 1970. She was the primary sponsor of the state-wide equal rights amendment (ERA) and led the movement to ratify the federal ERA in Washington. She was elected to the Washington State Senate in 1974, where she served for three terms, retiring from office in 1979. She was then elected to the King County Council to represent the 4th district, serving three terms. She chose not to seek re-election in 1991.

== Early life ==
North was born Lois Hiester on November 23, 1921, in Berkeley, California. She was the youngest of three children of Cyrus Hiester and Anna Bertelse Hiester. She was involved in student government and debate during her high school years. She graduated from the University of California, Berkeley, with a Bachelor of Arts degree and a general secondary teaching certificate. She completed graduate studies at UC Berkeley and Columbia University.

In college, North met Douglass C. North and the couple married on June 29, 1944, in Albany, California. Her husband joined the U.S. Merchant Marines for a year during World War II and then began a career in economics, for which he later received a Nobel Memorial Prize in 1993. The couple later divorced in 1972.

== Early political activism ==
North began her career teaching high school history and math. When her husband accepted a job with the University of Washington in 1950, the couple moved to Seattle. They had three sons between 1951 and 1957 – Douglass, Christopher, and Malcolm – and North became a stay-at-home mom.

During this time, she became politically involved, joining the League of Women Voters of Seattle and serving as the chapter's president between 1963 and 1967. North supported that the League was non-partisan but she took a strong stand on issues, supporting a state income tax, lowering the voting age to eighteen, and a constitutional amendment to enact a recurrent, ten-year requirement for redistricting. She lobbied the state capital in Olympia in favor of these issues on behalf of the organization. The League had drafted a previous ballot initiative in 1957 to redistrict the state, which had been dismantled by the state legislature, and North became state chair for the 1962 effort to introduce a redistricting ballot initiative. After drafting the measure, working with advisors and holding public hearings, the initiative was ultimately rejected by voters.

In 1967, she was elected to the King County commission tasked with drafting a new county charter. Along with fourteen fellow freeholders, she made recommendations to the public about proposed amendments to county offices. She was in favor of either an appointed or elected county administrator with a stated political affiliation. The proposed King County charter was approved by voters in 1968.

== Political career ==
North was encouraged by Tim Hill to run for election in his former seat in the Washington House of Representatives when he resigned to join the Seattle City Council in 1967. She was elected as the representative for the 44th district in November 1968. As a moderate Republican, her views aligned with Governor Daniel J. Evans and she supported his ultimately unsuccessful tax reform. She sponsored six environmental bills during the first session, covering areas such as open space, liability for oil spills, government-mandated effluent standards, and a recreational trail system.

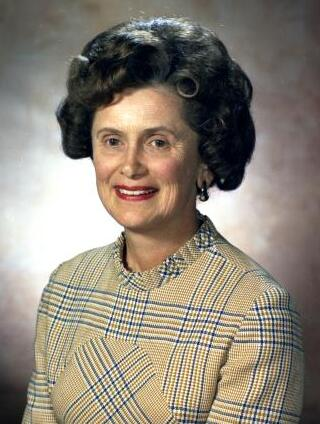
North in 1973

She was one of five women in the House during her first term, out of a total of 99 members. North joined the Women's Council, a revised version of the Commission on the Status of Women created by Governor Albert Rosellini. In this role, North – who was openly pro-choice at a time when this was a bipartisan position – sponsored a bill to reform abortion by amending the criminal code. However, the reforms were instead proposed as a ballot initiative. Initiative 20, which was passed on November 3, 1970, made it legal for women to have an abortion in the first four months of a pregnancy. Encouraged by Evans, North became the primary sponsor for the state equal rights amendment (ERA). She also led the effort for the state to ratify the federal ERA. On March 22, 1973, the state legislature ratified the ERA.

=== Washington State Senate (1975–1979) ===
North decided to run for the Washington State Senate in July 1974, when fellow Republican Ted Peterson announced his retirement as the senator for the 44th district. She received his endorsement at the press conference where he announced his resignation, and she declared her intention to run. She was the underdog, running against Democrat Fred H. Dore. She won in a narrow election on November 5, 1974, receiving an additional five votes following a recount called by Dore. She served for three terms, a member of the committees for education, ecology, local governance, social and health services, and energy and utilities.

=== King County Council (1980–1991) ===
North was elected to the King County Council to represent the 4th district in 1979. She served three terms and was chair of the council in 1982, 1990, and 1991. The council removed the Richmond Beach sewage treatment plant, agreed a garbage disposal contract with the City of Seattle and expanded local parks. She supported a $31.5 million bond issue to improve Woodland Park Zoo, which received voter approval in 1986. In 1987, she faced Democrat Bobbe Bridge and narrowly won. Her election prevented the Democrats from winning a veto-proof majority, and her remaining time on the council was uncomfortable as other members had openly supported Bridge. She decided not to seek re-election in 1991.

== Later life and death ==
North served on the 1996–97 King County Charter Review Commission and again on the 2007–08 commission, of which she was the co-chair. In 1998, she was appointed to lead the board of the Elevated Transportation Company, which was created by the Monorail Initiative. Governor Gary Locke appointed her to the Central Puget Sound Growth Management Hearings Board, where she served from 2000 to 2006. She was on the board of the Swedish Hospital/Ballard Campus Foundation, Northwest Hospital, the Municipal League of King County, and Planned Parenthood. She was also a member of the Business and Professional Women's Club and the Blue Ridge Community Club.

North died on September 20, 2025, at the age of 103.
