= Gary Grant (politician) =

American politician (1934–2022)

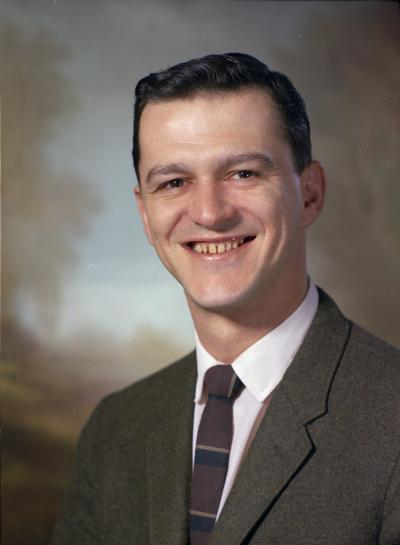
- Grant in 1967

Chair of the King County Council
- In office January 1, 1987 – January 1, 1990
- Preceded by: Audrey Gruger
- Succeeded by: Lois North
- In office January 1, 1984 – January 1, 1986
- Preceded by: Lois North
- Succeeded by: Audrey Gruger

Member of King County Council from the 9th district
- In office January 1, 1978 – January 1, 1990
- Preceded by: Bob Gaines
- Succeeded by: Kent Pullen

Member of the Washington House of Representatives from the 47th district
- In office January 14, 1963 – January 8, 1973
- Preceded by: Dick Poff
- Succeeded by: Kent Pullen

Member of the Washington Senate from the 11th district
- In office January 1, 1973 – November 23, 1977 (Resigned November 23, 1977; Elected to King County Council)
- Preceded by: Hubert F. Donohue
- Succeeded by: A.N. "Bud" Shinpoch

Personal details
- Born: September 18, 1934 Chippewa Falls, Wisconsin, U.S.
- Died: January 17, 2022 (aged 87) Tucson, Arizona, U.S.
- Party: Democratic

Gary Grant (September 18, 1934 – January 17, 2022) was an American politician in the state of Washington. He served in the Washington State House of Representatives 47th district from 1963 to 1973, and the Washington State Senate 11th district from 1973-1977. He was elected to the King County Council in 1977 and served the 9th district until 1990. He also served as an elected Commissioner for The Port of Seattle from 1990 until his retirement in 2000. Gary Grant Park, named in his honor, is a community park that serves as a trailhead for the Soos Creek Trail located in Kent, WA Grant died in Tucson, Arizona on January 17, 2022, at the age of 87.
