= Ed Munro =

American politician

Member of the King County Council from the 7th district
- In office May 1, 1969 – January 1, 1974
- Preceded by: Constituency established
- Succeeded by: Paul Barden

King County Commissioner
- In office May 1, 1958 – May 1, 1969
- Preceded by: William H. Sears
- Succeeded by: Office abolished

Member of the Washington House of Representatives from the 31st district
- In office January 10, 1955 – January 12, 1959
- Preceded by: George L. Sorensen
- Succeeded by: Victor A. Meyers Jr.

Personal details
- Party: Democratic

Ed Munro was an American politician who served as a member of the King County Council from 1969 to 1974. A member of the Democratic Party, he represented the 7th district.
