= Jorge Barón (politician) =

American politician and attorney

Member of the King County Council, District 4
- Incumbent
- Assumed office January 9, 2024
- Preceded by: Jeanne Kohl-Welles

Personal details
- Party: Democratic
- Spouse: Tyler Crone
- Relations: Jorge Barón (father)
- Children: 2
- Education: Duke University (BA); Yale University (JD)

Jorge L. Barón is a Colombian-American politician, attorney, and former actor. He has been a member of the King County Council in Washington since 2024, representing District 4.

== Early life ==
Barón is the eldest son of Jorge Barón, a Colombian television personality and businessperson. He grew up in Bogotá and appeared on television programs with his father. Barón immigrated with his mother to the United States in 1986 at the age of 13 without knowing English. He graduated from Duke University in 1995 and later worked in film and television production in Los Angeles. Barón worked as an assistant director for The Negotiator, The Mask of Zorro, and the series JAG.

He chose to work as an international human rights lawyer after a visit to the Auschwitz concentration camp and graduated from the Yale Law School. Barón moved from Connecticut to Seattle in 2006 to join the Northwest Immigrant Rights Project (NWIRP) as a staff attorney in 2006. He became the executive director of the NWIRP in 2008 and held the position until 2023. During his tenure, the organization grew to 130 people in four offices and rose to prominence through their opposition to travel bans enacted by the Trump administration in the late 2010s. The NWIRP also fought to close the Northwest Detention Center, a U.S. Immigration and Customs Enforcement facility in Tacoma, Washington, that has had several long hunger strikes by inmates. Barón left his position as executive director in June 2023.

== Political career ==
Barón announced his campaign for the King County Council seat representing District 4 in May 2023 following the retirement of incumbent Jeanne Kohl-Welles. The district includes portions of northwestern Seattle. His campaign focused on racial justice and addressing the regional homelessness crisis. Barón had 51 percent of the vote in the primary election and advanced to the top-two general election alongside assistant attorney general Sarah Reyneveld; both candidates were described as "progressive lawyers". Barón was elected to the King County Council in November 2023. He took office on January 9, 2024, becoming one of the first Latino American members of the council.

== Personal life ==
He met his wife Tyler Crone at the Yale Law School, where she graduated with a master's degree in public health. They have two children. His family filed a lawsuit against the Seattle Department of Planning and Development in 2007 for an improper environmental review of the proposed demolition of the Seventh Church of Christ, Scientist near their home due to increased lead exposure.
