= Kent Pullen =

American politician (1942–2003)

Chair of the King County Council
- In office January 1, 1994 – January 1, 1996
- Preceded by: Audrey Gruger
- Succeeded by: Jane Hague

Member of King County Council from the 9th district
- In office January 1, 1990 – April 14, 2003
- Preceded by: Gary Grant
- Succeeded by: Steve Hammond

Member of the Washington Senate from the 47th district
- In office January 13, 1975 – January 2, 1990
- Preceded by: Martin Durkan
- Succeeded by: Michael E. Patrick

Member of the Washington House of Representatives from the 47th district
- In office January 8, 1973 – January 13, 1975
- Preceded by: Gary Grant
- Succeeded by: Marion Kyle Sherman

Personal details
- Born: Kent E. Pullen; May 4, 1942 New Mexico, U.S.
- Died: April 13, 2003 (aged 60) Enumclaw, Washington, U.S.
- Party: Republican
- Spouse: Fay Pullen (m. 1964)
- Children: 2
- Education: University of New Mexico (BA); University of Washington (DSc)

Kent E. Pullen (May 4, 1942 – April 14, 2003) was an American politician from Washington state. A member of the Republican Party, he served in the Washington House of Representatives, Washington State Senate, and the King County Council.

== Political career ==
Pullen held political office for over 30 years. In 1972, he was elected to the Washington House of Representatives and in 1974, he was elected to the Washington State Senate representing the 47th District, serving until 1990.

In 1989, Pullen was elected to the King County Council representing the 9th Council District, narrowly winning by 306 votes. He would chair the Law and Justice Committee and from 1994-1995, he would serve as the chair of the King County Council.

=== Ideology ===
Pullen described himself as a conservative who could work well with others. He strongly supported unions, labor rights, and county employees, unlike his republican colleagues.

He would be a strong supporter of civil rights by passing legislation that prohibits disciplinary action against workers who speak a language other than English on the job, and voting against legislation clamping down on teenage "cruising."

Pullen supported law enforcement and victims of crimes. As chair of the Law and Justice Committee, he would pass laws that created stricter penalties for sex offenders, supported victims of crime, and victims of domestic violence.

Pullen was pro-gun rights, and had the nickname of "pistol-packin' Pullen". Once while in the Washington State Senate, on the Washington State Senate floor Pullen openly carried a Smith & Wesson and successfully passed legislation allowing gun owners to leave their firearms in their cars.

Pullman was a longtime supporter of alternative medicine. He assisted in establishing the King County Natural Medicine Clinic in Kent, Washington, the first government-subsidized natural medicine clinic in the United States.

== Personal life ==
Pullen was a graduate of the University of New Mexico, where he met his wife. In 1967, Pullen graduated from the University of Washington with a Ph.D. in Chemistry. When the state legislature was not in session, he worked at Boeing and was a former councilman in the Society of Professional Engineering Employees in Aerospace (SPEEA). Pullen was an avid chess player and tied for first place in the 1985 Washington State Chess Championship.

Pullen was married for 39 years and is survived by his wife, Fay, and two children, Kathy and Walter.

== Death and legacy ==
In March 2003, Pullen announced that he was ill with a minor adrenal gland problem but denied any serious illness. He received both traditional and nontraditional care. On April 13, 2003, Pullen was admitted into Enumclaw Community Hospital, where he would die later that day.

After his death, the King County Council voted to name the Regional Communication and Emergency Coordination Center after him.
