= Les Thomas (politician) =

American businessman and politician

Kent City Council, Position No. 3
- Incumbent
- Assumed office January 1, 2004
- Preceded by: Rico Yingling

Member of the King County Council from the 13th district
- In office March 28, 2001 – January 1, 2002
- Preceded by: Chris Vance
- Succeeded by: Julia Patterson

Member of the Washington House of Representatives from the 31st district
- In office January 7, 1994 – January 11, 1999
- Preceded by: Chris Vance
- Succeeded by: Christopher Hurst

Personal details
- Born: December 10, 1945 (age 80) Macomb, Illinois, U.S.
- Party: Independent (2014–present)
- Other political affiliations: Republican (before 2014)
- Spouse: Pauline Thomas
- Children: 4
- Education: Highline College (attended); University of Washington (BA); University of Puget Sound (MBA)

Les S. Thomas (born December 10, 1945) is an American businessman and politician serving as a member of the Kent City Council since 2004. A member of the Republican Party prior to 2014 and an independent since 2014, he previously served as a member of the King County Council and the Washington House of Representatives.
