= Kathy Lambert =

American politician and educator

Member of the King County Council from the 3rd district
- In office January 1, 2002 – January 1, 2022
- Preceded by: C. Louise Miller
- Succeeded by: Sarah Perry

Member of the Washington House of Representatives from the 45th district
- In office January 9, 1995 – January 1, 2002
- Preceded by: Bill Finkbeiner
- Succeeded by: Toby Nixon

Personal details
- Born: Kathy Kristensen Lambert; February 1, 1953 (age 73) Redmond, Washington, United States
- Party: Republican
- Spouse: D. Lambert
- Education: Seattle Pacific University (attended); College of Marin (AA); University of Washington (BA)
- Occupation: Politician; teacher; Retired

Kathy Kristensen Lambert (born 1 February 1953) served as an American politician and educator from Washington state. Lambert was a 20 year member of the King County Council for the third district, the largest district covering much of the eastern part of the county. Lambert is a former Republican member of the Washington House of Representatives where she served in leadership and taught elementary and middle school. She is also a published author and poet.

== Education ==
Lambert earned a Bachelor of Arts degree in Elementary and Business Education and teaching certification from the University of Washington.

== Career ==
Kathy Lambert has served her community, the county and the state as an elected official for 27 years and overlapped with 16 years of elementary and middle school teaching. She was selected by Governing Magazine Women in Leadership to be in their class of 2019. In 2013, she was named the United Way of King County Elected Official of the year.

As a state legislator she served on a variety of committees including Appropriations, Law and Justice, and Children and Family Services. She was a prime author of many state laws including ones on domestic violence and establishing “foreign protection orders” which allowed domestic violence orders to be accepted in other states. This later became a national law. She worked on a team with Congresswoman Jennifer Dunn on Welfare Reform as Washington state was a leader on this issue. Kathy spoke at a national conference on this topic. She also wrote the Erin Act to provide immediate insurance for newborns. She was known for reading the bills fully and working across the aisle to develop good public policy.

She served in leadership positions in the WA State House of Representatives and on the King County Council. Kathy also served on numerous boards including the WA State SIDS Foundation Board of Directors, The State Forensic Investigations Board, The State Office of Public Defense Board for nearly 20 years and helped establish the family reunification program, The WA State County Roads Administration Board, The WA Association of Counties WSAC Board and Legislative Steering Committee and was National Chair of the American Legislative Exchange Council Law and Justice Committee.

As a council member for 20 years, she served on nearly every committee so she could represent the rural and local government for a mostly urban county. As chair or vice chair of the Law and Justice Committee over the years she worked to modernize the court by establishing the Court of the Future, established programs to help youth such as the Family Intervention Resource Programs FIRS, and Safe Place Program where youth could find help at a variety of resources across the county. She established a texting program to remind youth to come to court.

Prior to her work in government, she taught elementary and middle school. As a teacher, she served on the oversight team and she also developed emergency preparedness programs for the district.

She is a published poet and author of a children’s book on Martin Luther King Jr.

In 2022, she joined a woman’s advisory board and began writing a book. Lambert is also a published poet and children's book author and is currently writing a book.

=== Election history ===
On November 8, 1994, Lambert won the election and became a Republican member of Washington House of Representatives for District 45, Position 1. Lambert defeated Philip James with 70.04% of the votes. Lambert started her term on January 3, 1995. On November 5, 1996, as an incumbent, Lambert won the election and continued serving District 45, Position 1. Lambert defeated Trina Good with 61.87% of the votes. On November 3, 1998, as an incumbent, Lambert won the election unopposed and continued serving District 45, Position 1. On November 7, 2000, as an incumbent, Lambert won the election and continued serving District 45, Position 1. Lambert defeated Jim Gordon with 68.58% of the votes.

On November 6, 2001, Lambert won the election and became a member of King County Council for District 3. Lambert defeated Democrat Kristy Sullivan with 64.11% of the votes.

In 2009 and 2013 she was unopposed.

In November 2021, she was defeated for reelection by Sarah Perry.

== Awards ==
- 2013 Outstanding Public Official of the Year. Presented by United Way of King County.
- 2013 Norm Maleng Award. Presented by LifeWire - Domestic Violence Prevention Program.
- 2013 International Rose Day Award. Presented by Zonta Club of East King County.
- 2013 Technology Champion in King County
- 2014 Sno Valley Senior Center Advocate of the Year
- 2010 Alliance of Eastside Agencies Elected Official of the Year
- 2010 King County Conservation District Conservation Leader
- 2010 Behavioral Sciences Institute Child Advocate of the Year
- 1996 Most-Bipartisan Legislator
- 1995 Rising Star Award.by Law and Justice Magazine
- 2019 Honored to be in Women in Government Leadership Group

== Personal life ==
Lambert's and her husband live in Redmond, Washington.
