= Northwest Immigrant Rights Project =

US non-profit organization

- Abbreviation: NWIRP
- Type: Immigrant rights organization
- Headquarters: Seattle, Washington
- Region served: Washington state
- Website: nwirp.org

Northwest Immigrant Rights Project (NWIRP) is a non-profit legal services organization in Washington state. NWIRP's mission is to promote justice by defending and advancing the rights of immigrants through direct legal services, systemic advocacy, and community education.

== History ==
Founded in 1984, in the context of the sanctuary movement, the project was created to address the legal needs of Central American refugees and others who were able to legalize their status under Amnesty programs. NWIRP has grown significantly in scope and currently serves more than 10,000 low-income immigrants per year from more than 100 countries across Latin America, Asia, the Middle East, Eastern and Western Europe and Africa.

King County Councilmember Jorge L. Barón was director of the organization from 2008 to 2023. Its current director is Malou Chávez.

== Offices ==
NWIRP has four offices in Washington State. The Seattle Office serves immigrant communities in Western Washington. The Granger Office (in the Yakima Valley) and the Wenatchee Office, serve the immigrant communities in Eastern Washington. The Tacoma Office originally focused solely on serving persons detained at the Northwest Detention Center (owned and operated by the GEO Group), but now also provides representation to non-detained immigrant communities in Western Washington.

== Areas of practice ==
NWIRP provides direct representation to individuals who are applying for political asylum, family visas, lawful status under the Violence Against Women Act, and naturalization or citizenship. NWIRP also provides direct representation, defending individuals who are placed in removal proceedings (deportation proceedings). In addition, supported by a grant from the Executive Office for Immigration Review of the U.S. Department of Justice, NWIRP provides legal orientation sessions to all persons detained at the Northwest Detention Center in Tacoma, Washington, who are placed in removal proceedings. Additionally, NWIRP regularly hosts webinars and trainings for immigrant rights advocates and attorneys.

== Impact Litigation ==
Apart from representing individuals in administrative proceedings, NWIRP also provides direct representation before the federal district courts and the courts of appeals, primarily the Ninth Circuit Court of Appeals. These are generally impact litigation cases, designed to affect large numbers of people and bring about meaningful social change through setting precedents.

In addition, NWIRP has represented clients before the U.S. Supreme Court. For example, NWIRP's legal director, Matt Adams, presented arguments to the Supreme Court in January 2022, arguing on behalf of two certified classes that had prevailed in the district courts and the Ninth Circuit Court of Appeals. The district courts and the court of appeals had ordered that the class members be granted bond hearings after being held in immigration detention for six months. The Supreme Court in Garland v. Aleman Gonzalez, 142 S. Ct. 2057 (2022), reversed the Ninth Circuit, and held that 8 U.S.C. § 1252(f)(1) prohibits lower courts from entering injunctions that "order federal officials to take or to refrain from taking actions to enforce, implement, or otherwise carry out" certain parts of the Immigration and Nationality Act (INA), including its detention provisions. The decision severely restricts judiciary's ability to require that the executive branch comply with the INA.

NWIRP also joined with former NWIRP attorney Robert Pauw in successfully petitioning the U.S. Supreme Court to vacate a Ninth Circuit opinion that had barred federal district courts from reviewing danger determinations in bond hearings. Martinez v. Clark, 144 S.Ct. 1339 (2024).

NWIRP has a long and successful history of successful litigation before the Court of Appeals for the Ninth Circuit, from which it has obtained over two dozen of published decisions that have shaped the contours of several areas of immigration law. These decisions include: Zhovtonizhko v. Garland, 69 F.4th 1038 (9th Cir. 2023); Koonwaiyou v. Blinken, 69 F.4th 1004 (9th Cir. 2023); Alfred v. Garland, 64 F.4th 1025 (9th Cir. 2023) (en banc decision overturning a prior NWIRP victory in Alfred v. Garland, 13 F.4th 980 (9th Cir. 2021); Galvez v. Jaddou, 52 F.4th 821 (9th Cir. 2022); Flores Tejada v. Godfrey, 954 F.3d 1245 (9th Cir. 2020) (overturned by Garland v. Aleman Gonzalez, 142 S. Ct. 2057 (2022)); Hernandez-Galand v. Garland, 996 F.3d 1030 (9th Cir. 2021); Reynaga Hernandez v. Skinner, 969 F.3d 930 (9th Cir. 2020); Khoury v. Asher, 667 F. App'x 966, 967 (9th Cir. 2016) (overturned by Nielsen v. Preap, 139 S. Ct. 954 (2019)); C.J.L.G. v. Barr, 923 F.3d 622 (9th Cir. 2019) (en banc); Lanuza v. Love, 899 F.3d 1019 (9th Cir. 2018); Ramirez v. Brown, 852 F.3d 954, 955 (9th Cir. 2017); Mondaca-Vega v. Lynch, 808 F.3d 413, 416 (9th Cir. 2015) (en banc); Duran-Gonzales v. DHS, 702 F.3d 504 (9th Cir. 2013); Chay Ixcot v. Holder, 646 F.3d 1202 (9th Cir. 2011); Lopez-Birrueta v. Holder, 633 F.3d 1211(9th Cir. 2011); Cortez-Guillen v. Holder, 623 F.3d 933 (9th Cir. 2010); Bromfield v. Mukasey, 543 F.3d 1071 (9th Cir. 2008); Doissaint v. Mukasey, 538 F.3d 1167 (9th Cir. 2008); Mandujano-Real v. Mukasey, 526 F.3d 585 (9th Cir. 2008); Suazo-Perez v. Mukasey, 512 F.3d 1222 (9th Cir. 2008); Hosseini v. Gonzales, 464 F.3d 1018 (9th Cir. 2006); Cuevas-Gaspar v. Gonzales, 430 F.3d 1013 (9th Cir. 2005); Perez-Gonzalez v. Ashcroft, 379 F.3d 783 (9th Cir. 2004); Garcia-Lopez v. Ashcroft, 334 F.3d 840 (9th Cir. 2003); Castro-Cortez v. Ashcroft, 239 F.3d 1037 (9th Cir. 2001).

NWIRP has also been certified as class counsel in over a dozen class actions successfully challenging, inter alia, unlawful immigration detention, deprivation of access to counsel, and wrongful denial of immigration benefits. Among the most notable cases are: Franco-Gonzales v. Holder, 767 F.Supp.2d 1034 (C.D.Cal. 2010), where the court issued injunctive relief requiring appointed counsel at government expense for detained persons in removal proceedings with mental impairment issues (the first case requiring appointed counsel at government expense for persons in immigration proceedings); Roshandel v. Chertoff, 554 F.Supp.2d 1194 (W.D.Wash. 2008), the first certified class in the nation challenging background checks which indefinitely delayed naturalization applications; Nightingale v. U.S. Citizenship & Immigr. Servs., 333 F.R.D. 449 (N.D. Cal. 2019), the district court granted a permanent injunction on behalf of a nationwide class of individuals seeking copies of their immigration files, bringing a claim under the Freedom of Information Act (FOIA), the first time a class was certified bringing a FOIA claim; Mendez Rojas v. Johnson, 305 F. Supp. 3d 1176 (W.D. Wash. 2018), court granted summary judgment in favor of a nationwide class of asylum applicants who were not provided notice that they needed to file their asylum applications within one year of entering the United States; Galvez v. Jaddou, 52 F.4th 821 (9th Cir. 2022), where the Ninth Circuit affirmed a permanent injunction issued on behalf of a class of applicants for Special Immigrant Juvenile status, requiring the agency to complete the applications within 180 days, as required by 8 U.S.C. § 1232(d)(2); Rosario v USCIS, 365 F.Supp.3d 1156 (W.D. WA 2018), the district court granted a permanent injunction on behalf of a nationwide class of asylum applicants, requiring USCIS to issue initial work permits within 30 days as required by the regulations.

In addition, NWIRP has brought litigation on behalf of itself and the clients it served in challenges that ultimately defended the rights of immigrants across the country. Most notably, in Nw. Immigrant Rts. Project v. Sessions, No. C17-716 RAJ, 2017 WL 3189032 (W.D. Wash. July 27, 2017), NWIRP challenged a cease and desist letter issued by EOIR under the Trump administration, that sought to prohibit NWIRP from providing limited legal services to pro se persons in removal proceedings. The district court issued a preliminary injunction, requiring that Defendants permit NWIRP and other nonprofit agencies to provide limited legal services. After discovery, Defendants entered into a settlement with NWIRP that required Defendants to publish a new regulation making clear that it is lawful to provide limited legal services to persons in removal proceedings. Also noteworthy during the Trump administration, in Nw. Immigrant Rts. Project v. United States Citizenship & Immigr. Servs., 496 F. Supp. 3d 31 (D.D.C. 2020), NWIRP and partners successfully challenged a new rule that sought to raise fees imposed on immigrants filing for certain immigration benefits by hundreds of dollars, and also imposed new fees on asylum seekers.

== Partners ==
NWIRP often partners with other immigrant rights organizations in its litigation, most notably the National Immigration Litigation Alliance., the ACLU, and the American Immigration Council.

== Golden Door Award ==
NWIRP previously presented the Golden Door Award to one organization or individual for their outstanding work promoting justice and dignity for immigrants and refugees. Nominees have often furthered the cause of immigrant and refugee rights on a national, state, or local level. Previous award recipients include:

- 2013 Luis Moscoso
- 2009 Radio KSVR 91.7
- 2008 Jana Heyd
- 2007 Colors NW Magazine; Victoria Cherniak and the Newcomers Resource Project of the King County Bar Association
- 2006 Annie Benson; El Comite Pro Amnistia
- 2005 Rep. Phyllis Gutierrez Kenney; Jill Dutton
- 2004 Legal Foundation of Washington; The Sanctuary Movement; Dr. Richard Kovar
- 2003 Atieno Odhiambo; David Ayala
- 2002 Diane Narasaki; Nieves Negrete
- 2001 Guadalupe Gamboa; Roberta Ray
- 2000 KDNA Radio; Jay Stansel & Jennifer Wellman
- 1999 Bob & Gracie Ekblad and Vince Brown; Grance Huang & Rebecca Smith

== Amicus Award ==
NWIRP previously presented the Amicus Award to a law firm that has "shown exceptional participation and dedication to the pro bono legal representation of immigrants and refugees." Previous award recipients include:

- 2013 Perkins Coie
- 2009 Matthew Geyman (Phillips Law Group)
- 2008 Williams Kastner for its pro bono representation of low-income individuals seeking political asylum.
- 2007 Professor Anita Ramasastry and the Immigrant Families Advocacy Project of the University of Washington School of Law
- 2006 Bob Pauw and Bob Gibbs, Law Office of Gibbs Houston Pauw
- 2005 Cozen O' Connor
- 2004 Perkins Coie
