= Jane Hague =

American politician (born 1945 or 1946)

Chair of the King County Council
- In office January 1, 1996 – January 1, 1998
- Preceded by: Kent Pullen
- Succeeded by: C. Louise Miller

Member of the King County Council
- In office January 1, 1994 – January 1, 2016
- Preceded by: Constituency established
- Succeeded by: Claudia Balducci
- Constituency: 11th district (1994–2006); 6th district (2006–2016)

Personal details
- Born: 1945 or 1946 (age 79–80)
- Political party: Republican
- Spouse: Ed Springman

Jane F. Hague (born 1945 or 1946) is an American politician who served as a member of the King County Council in Washington state in the United States. She represented District 6, which encompasses the cities and towns of Beaux Arts, Bellevue, Clyde Hill, Hunts Point, Kirkland, Medina, Mercer Island, Redmond, Yarrow Point, and Woodinville.

== Career ==
Hague was first elected to the council in 1994 as a Republican during the merger of Metro with King County Government. In 1996 she was elected Chair.

Prior to 2007 Hague was easily reelected four times with little or no opposition. In 2007, she won reelection in that year's council election with 57-percent of the vote, running against a perennial candidate she outspent $433,000 to $35,000. In 2015, she was defeated for reelection by Claudia Balducci.

Hague served as Vice Chair of the Council.

== Personal life ==
Hague lives in Bellevue and is married to businessman and civic leader Ed Springman. She enjoys cycling, skiing, and mountain climbing. Prior to joining the Council she served as the Manager of Records and Elections for King County, and was an elected member of the Bellevue City Council. She has been on the King County Boys and Girls Club Board of Directors (1999–2009), elected President of the National Association of Counties (2000–2001), and was one of the founding Board of Directors for Sound Transit (1996–2002). In June 2007, she was cited for suspicion of Driving under influence. She pleaded guilty to a lesser charge and publicly apologized to her constituents, fellow council members, and police.

== Awards ==
- 2013 Norm Maleng Award. Presented by LifeWire.
