= C. Louise Miller =

American politician and educator from Washington

Chair of the King County Council
- In office January 1, 1998 – January 1, 2000
- Preceded by: Jane Hague
- Succeeded by: Pete von Reichbauer

Member of the King County Council from the 3rd district
- In office January 3, 1994 – January 1, 2002
- Preceded by: Brian Derdowski
- Succeeded by: Kathy Lambert

Member of the Washington House of Representatives from the 45th district
- In office January 10, 1983 – January 3, 1994
- Preceded by: Delores E. Teutsch
- Succeeded by: Bill Backlund

Personal details
- Born: December 28, 1936 (age 89)
- Party: Republican
- Spouse: Stafford Miller
- Children: 2
- Education: San Jose State University (BA)
- Occupation: Politician; teacher

C. Louise Miller (born December 28, 1936) is an American politician and educator from Washington. Miller is a former member of the King County Council, third district, which includes North Bend, Snoqualmie, Issaquah, Sammamish, Fall City, Preston, Duvall, Redmond, Carnation, Skykomish, and part of Woodinville. Miller is a former Republican member of Washington House of Representatives.
