= Toby Nixon =

American politician from Washington

Member of the Washington House of Representatives from the 45th district
- In office January 7, 2002 – January 8, 2007
- Preceded by: Kathy Lambert
- Succeeded by: Roger Goodman

Kirkland City Council, Position No. 4
- In office January 1, 2012 – January 1, 2024
- Preceded by: Jessica Greenway
- Succeeded by: John Tymczyszyn

Personal details
- Born: March 26, 1959 (age 67)
- Party: Republican
- Spouse: Irene Nixon
- Children: 5
- Occupation: Politician

Toby Nixon (born March 26, 1959) is an American politician in Washington. Nixon served as a member of the Kirkland City Council in Position 4 from 2012 until 2024 when he was succeeded by John Tymczyszyn who defeated him. Nixon is a former Republican member of Washington House of Representatives, representing the 45th district from 2002 to 2007.

He was appointed to a vacant House seat in 2002, and was elected as an incumbent in 2004. He served on the House Committee for State Government Operations and Accountability as a ranking member, and is known for his advocacy on behalf of open government. He also served on the Technology, Energy and Communications Committee and the Transportation Committee.

In the spring of 2006, Nixon announced that he would not be a candidate for re-election but instead that he would be running for the State Senate seat being vacated by retiring Senator Bill Finkbeiner. In November 2006, Nixon lost the race to Eric Oemig.

In November 2009, Nixon was elected with 65% of the vote to serve on the King County Fire Protection District No. 41.

== Awards ==
- 2006 Freedom's Light Award. Presented by The Washington Newspaper Publishers Association.
- 2012 Heroes of the 50 States: The State Open Government Hall of Fame. Presented by National Freedom of Information Coalition and Society of Professional Journalist.
- 2021 James Madison Award. Presented by Washington Coalition for Open Government.

== Personal life ==
Nixon's wife is Irene Nixon. They have five children. Nixon and his family live in Kirkland, Washington.
