= Audrey Gruger =

American politician (1930–2010)

Chair of the King County Council
- In office January 1, 1992 – January 1, 1994
- Preceded by: Lois North
- Succeeded by: Kent Pullen
- In office January 1, 1986 – January 1, 1987
- Preceded by: Gary Grant
- Succeeded by: Gary Grant

Member of the King County Council from the 1st district
- In office January 1, 1982 – January 1, 1994
- Preceded by: Tracy Owen
- Succeeded by: Maggie Fimia

Member of the Washington House of Representatives from the 1st district
- In office November 30, 1976 – January 10, 1982
- Preceded by: Vern Daeley
- Succeeded by: Grace E. Cole

Personal details
- Born: Audrey Lindgren Gruger; May 17, 1930
- Died: March 24, 2010 (aged 79)
- Party: Democratic

Audrey Lindgren Gruger (May 17, 1930 – March 24, 2010) was an American politician who served as a member of the King County Council from 1982 to 1994. A member of the Democratic Party, she represented the 1st district.
