= Marion Kyle Sherman =

American politician (born 1925)

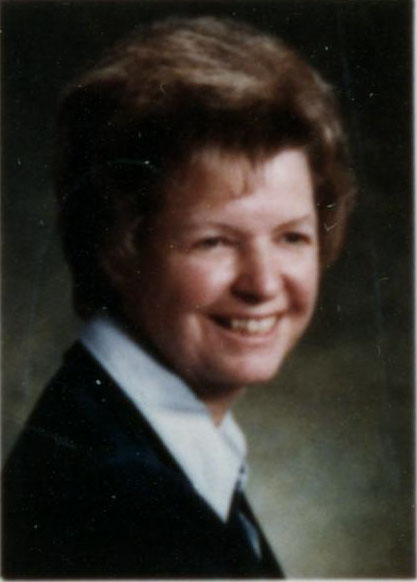
- Sherman in 1977

Member of the Washington House of Representatives for the 47th district
- In office 1975–1983

Personal details
- Born: October 17, 1925 Puyallup, Washington, U.S.
- Party: Democratic

Marion Kyle Sherman (born October 17, 1925, date of death unknown) was an American politician in the state of Washington. She served the 47th district from 1975 to 1983. Prior to this, Sherman supported the United States war effort as a riveter with Boeing during World War II. She lived in Maple Valley, Washington and was married to Leonard Sherman. Together they had two children. Sherman is deceased.
