= Bernice Stern =

American politician (1916-2007)

Chair of the King County Council
- In office January 1, 1978 – January 1, 1979
- Preceded by: Mike Lowry
- Succeeded by: Ruby Chow

Member of the King County Council from the 4th district
- In office July 1, 1969 – January 1, 1980
- Preceded by: Constituency established
- Succeeded by: Lois North

Personal details
- Born: Bernice Friedman Stern; July 25, 1916 Seattle, Washington, U.S.
- Died: June 29, 2007 (aged 90) Seattle, Washington, U.S.
- Party: Democratic
- Spouse: Edward Friend Stern

Bernice Friedman Stern (July 25, 1916 – June 29, 2007) was an American politician who served as a member of the King County Council from 1969 to 1980. A member of the Democratic Party, she represented the 4th district and was the first woman elected to the council.

== Early life and activism ==
Stern was born on July 25, 1916, in Seattle, Washington, to a butcher and a homemaker. Her mother died of cancer when she was a teenager, and her father died a few years later of a heart attack. Stern was an honors student at Broadway Hogh School and active in the Jewish community.

After high school, Stern attended the University of Washington for two years studying Oriental studies because it was "something very easy so I could go out on lots of dates." In 1935, she dropped out of college after marrying Edward Friend Stern, a lawyer. After their honeymoon, Stern's mother-in-law introduced her to the Seattle chapter of the National Council of Jewish Women (NCJW) and would rise through the ranks. In 1942, at 26, she became the organization's youngest president. Stern was also the head of the Seattle Section and Western Region for NCJW as well as the youngest national officer. While at the NCJW, she was against the council's focus on the new state of Israel, saying, "We should act independently, avoiding centralized control of any kind."

Stern was active in other organizations, including the "Grey Ladies" of the Red Cross, but left due to the organization's discrimination against black sailors. She also worked with the YWCA on the "Speak Up -- Freedom Needs Exercise" campaign to combat book banning at the Seattle Public Library. Stern was also active in the Women's rights movement of the 1960s and was one of the few women invited to the White House by President John F. Kennedy for a meeting on civil rights to "guarantee human rights to every citizen regardless of color."

== King County Council ==
In 1968, voters approved the King County Home Rule Charter, which created the King County Executive and the nine-member county council. Stern ran in the heavily Republican 4th district as a liberal Jewish activist, one of 80 candidates. Her son David, an advertising and public relations executive, help Stern run her campaign. She won, becoming the first woman elected to the council.

During her tenure, Stern had testy relationships with her colleagues, especially the council member Mike Lowry who defeated her bid to become council chair in 1977. In an interview, Stern said, "I was so [angry] that I had sat there and let that nothing Mike Lowry beat me. He said, 'You can be vice-chairman, and you can be chairman next time.' I said, 'You can go back in your office and don’t come back in here again.'" In 1978, Stern was unanimously elected council chair. She was also chair of the Environmental Planning Committee and the Planning and Community Development Committee.

In 1979, Stern retired from the council to spend more time with her husband.

== Personal life ==
Stern was married to her husband until he died in 1980 of lung cancer. The couple had two sons, Edward Jr. and David. Stern died in 2007 from complications of pneumonia.
