= Chris Vance (politician) =

American politician (born 1962)

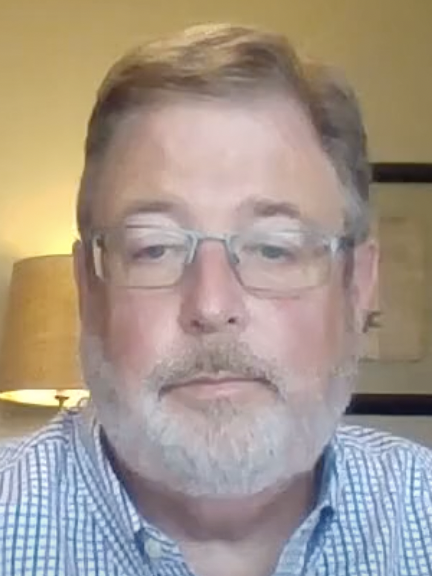
- Vance in 2020

Chair of the Washington Republican Party
- In office March 14, 2001 – January 28, 2006
- Preceded by: Don Benton
- Succeeded by: Diane Tebelius

Member of the King County Council from the 13th district
- In office January 1, 1994 – March 28, 2001
- Preceded by: Constituency established
- Succeeded by: Les Thomas

Member of the Washington House of Representatives from the 31st district
- In office January 14, 1991 – December 31, 1993
- Preceded by: Ernie Crane
- Succeeded by: Les Thomas

Personal details
- Born: May 1, 1962 (age 64) Seattle, Washington, U.S.
- Party: Republican (until 2017, 2025–present)
- Other political affiliations: Independent (2017–2025); Forward (2022–2023)
- Spouse: Ann Vance
- Children: 2
- Education: Western Washington University (BA)

Christopher M. Vance (born May 1, 1962) is an American politician who served two terms on the Metropolitan King County Council and is a former member of the Washington State Legislature. Vance is former chair of the Washington State Republican Party. He and his wife Ann raised their son and daughter in Auburn, Washington and now live in Sumner, Washington. Vance ran unsuccessfully for the U.S. Senate, losing to Democratic Senator Patty Murray in the 2016 election by 18 percentage points.

In September 2017 he announced that he had left the Republican Party and had become an independent. Vance was briefly leader of the Forward Party in Washington State until his resignation, he was replaced by Krist Novoselic.

Since the 2016 election Vance has been a leader in the "Never Trump" community of current and former Republicans. He currently considers himself "a Republican exile." Vance is now the Executive Director of Our Republican Legacy, which is working to return the GOP to traditional conservative principles.

== Early life and education ==
Vance was born in Seattle in 1962, and lived in Bellevue until the eighth grade, when his family moved to east Pierce County. In 1980, Vance graduated from Sumner High School. He attended Western Washington University where he earned a bachelor's degree in Political Science.

== Political career ==
After college Vance went to work for former Congressman Rod Chandler, then served as a research analyst with the Washington State Senate.

From 1991 to 1993 Vance served in the Washington House of Representatives for the 31st Legislative District, following an unsuccessful 1988 bid. He was the second ranking Republican on the House Education Committee, and was elected by his colleagues to the position of Assistant Floor Leader. From 1994 to 2001 he represented the 13th district of the King County Council, acting as a leader in the areas of budget, transportation and land-use. In 2000, he unsuccessfully ran for Congress.

In 2001, Vance was elected Chairman of the Washington State Republican Party. He worked to get Republican officials elected, including Rob McKenna, the first Republican State Attorney General in 13 years.

=== 2004 Washington gubernatorial election ===
Vance also played a central role in Dino Rossi's failed bid to become the Governor of Washington. After winning the first two statewide ballot counts, Secretary of State Sam Reed certified Rossi as the winner; however, a statewide hand recount resulted in the election of Democratic Party candidate Christine Gregoire.

The Rossi campaign and the Washington State Republican Party filed an election contest in Chelan County Superior Court. The controversy over the election lasted over six months, with Vance often serving as a spokesman for the party and Rossi's campaign.

=== 2016 U.S. Senate election ===
On September 8, 2015, Vance announced that he was running for the United States Senate. During the campaign he stated that could not support Donald Trump for President. Vance lost by a significant margin in 2016 to incumbent Democrat Patty Murray.

=== 2022 Washington Senate Bid ===
On March 15, 2022, Vance announced he was running for the Washington State Senate as an independent in the same 31st district he represented in the State House 30 years earlier. He lost the general election, garnering 44% of the vote.

== Departure from Republican Party ==
On September 29, 2017, Vance announced on KUOW's "Week in Review" podcast that he had left the Republican Party, saying the following:

I now consider myself an independent. I am no longer a Republican after 36 years...For years I've seen the party move away from things I believed in...It didn't begin with Trump, but he certainly accelerated the process...I just don't agree with [the Republican Party] on 90% of the issues they talk about today.

Vance said he would be focusing future efforts on helping to establish an independent centrist movement in the country and would encourage Independents across the country to run for office. A month earlier, Vance had formally announced his support of and participation in the Centrist Project, with the goal of electing enough centrist candidates that Republicans and Democrats would have to negotiate with each other.

== Never Trump movement and return to the Republican Party ==
Vance joined The Lincoln Project as a senior advisor in 2020. He endorsed Joe Biden and Jay Inslee for president and governor respectively in the 2020 presidential election and 2020 Washington gubernatorial election. From February until December 2021, Vance was a signatory for the Stand Up Republic affiliated 'A Call for American Renewal' manifesto. This manifesto sought to oust Donald Trump as the presumptive Republican candidate for president in 2024 and dismantle or replace the Republican Party.

In 2024 Vance helped manage volunteer activities in the battleground states for the Republicans for Harris campaign. Also in 2024, Vance joined Our Republican Legacy www.ourrepublicanlegacy.com as a Senior Advisor, and rejoined the Republican Party. In late 2026 he became the Executive Director of ORL

== Personal life ==
Vance serves as a Senior Fellow at the Niskanen Center, is a former adjunct professor at the University of Washington's Evans School of Public Affairs, and is a frequent media commentator on Washington State politics.

In 2017, Vance joined the American Civil Liberties Union, and in February, 2024, Vance published a short book on his experiences and analysis of the rise of Trump and the destruction of the Reaganite Republican Party, titled The Fall of The Shining City.

Party political offices
Preceded by Don Benton	Chair of the Washington Republican Party; 2001–2006	Succeeded by Diane Tebelius
Preceded by Dino Rossi	Republican nominee for U.S. Senator from Washington (Class 3); 2016	Succeeded by Tiffany Smiley
