= Pete von Reichbauer =

American politician (born 1944)

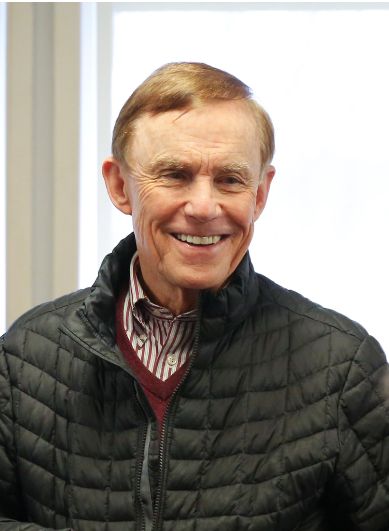
- von Reichbauer in 2020

Chair of the King County Council
- In office January 1, 2000 – January 1, 2002
- Preceded by: C. Louise Miller
- Succeeded by: Cynthia Sullivan

Member of the King County Council from the 7th district
- Incumbent
- Assumed office January 1, 1994
- Preceded by: Paul Barden

Member of the Washington Senate from the 30th district
- In office November 27, 1973 – January 1, 1994
- Preceded by: Michael W. Mattingly
- Succeeded by: Ray Schow

Personal details
- Born: December 30, 1944 (age 81) Seattle, Washington, U.S.
- Party: Non-partisan
- Education: University of Alabama (BA)
- Profession: Business Vice president
- Website: www.kingcounty.gov/council/vonReichbauer.aspx

Military service
- Allegiance: United States
- Branch/service: United States Army

Peter G. von Reichbauer (born December 30, 1944) is an American businessman and politician serving as a member of the nonpartisan King County Council, representing District 7, a 124-square-mile (320 km^{2}) region of South King County which includes all of the cities of Algona and Federal Way, the entire King County portions of Auburn, Milton, and Pacific and large unincorporated areas. Prior to his election to the council, von Reichbauer served as a Washington State Senator for the 30th Legislative District (representing South King County and North Pierce County) between 1973 and 1994.

Some of his notable achievements on the King County Council include forging public/private partnerships to protect the Hylebos Wetlands (a near shore salmon breeding habitat), helping fund the construction of the South King County Baseball fields, and securing the acquisition of Bingaman Pond as a County Park. In addition, von Reichbauer helped fund and rebuild Redondo Beach Drive, facilitated the construction of the Federal Way Transit Center and the 317th HOV ramps on Interstate 5, and worked with state and federal authorities to help construct the I-5 Triangle interchange in Federal Way.

== Early life and education ==
Pete von Reichbauer grew up in Lakewood, Washington and was the second son of Ludwig and Marian von Reichbauer. He went to public and private secondary schools, and graduated from the University of Alabama with a degree in history. After college he joined the US Army through the Reserve Officers' Training Corps (ROTC). In the course of his military service Pete was stationed at Ft. Bragg, North Carolina, Ft. Benjamin Harrison, Indiana and Ft. Benning, Georgia as well as overseas in Japan. After serving on active duty, the U.S. Army Reserve, and the Washington Army National Guard, he retired at the rank of Major.

== Washington State Senate ==
Upon returning to the Puget Sound area, von Reichbauer was approached by friend and then-State Senator Booth Gardner about running for public office. In a special election held in 1973 von Reichbauer ran a campaign that narrowly defeated 30th District Republican incumbent Mike Mattingly. The victory made von Reichbauer the youngest member of the Washington State Senate and the fourth youngest senator in Washington history. In the ensuing years he went on to chair the Parks and Recreation Committee, the Education Committee (K-12), the Transportation Committee, and the Financial Institutions and Insurance Committee of the Washington State Senate where he focused on consumer protection, consolidation of agencies and the reform of outdated regulations. He also worked to fund the newly formed and controversial Public Disclosure Commission.

After opposing a number of party line positions as a Democrat, von Reichbauer shook up Washington State politics on February 13, 1981, when he switched from a Democrat to a Republican in what was described as "the new St. Valentine's Day Massacre" and delivered the senate's tenuous 25-24 majority into the hands of the Republican Party. The switch caused a number of his former allies to condemn him as a "turncoat." However, Von Reichbauer survived the following recall effort and served in the Senate until he left his seat in midterm to run for the King County Council.

In 1992, von Reichbauer was the Republican nominee for the newly created 9th congressional district. He lost to Senate colleague Mike Kreidler, earning 43.17% of the vote.

== King County Council ==
In 1992, the voters approved a merger of the Municipality of Metropolitan Seattle (Metro) into King County government, and the King County Council was expanded to thirteen members. In 1993 von Reichbauer defeated State Representative Jean Marie Brough in the Republican primary election and defeated Federal Way mayor Bob Stead in the general election to become the District 7 King County Councilmember.

In 1994 von Reichbauer was named chair of the council's Budget and Fiscal Management Committee. As chair, von Reichbauer presided over an often contentious budget process in which he guided the Budget Committee for three years in a row. The Budget Committee unanimously passed the budget in 1994 and 1996, and passed the budget in 1995 by a vote of 12 to 1.

In 2000 and 2001 von Reichbauer was elected to serve as Chair of the King County Council. He was elected vice-chair by his colleagues when the Metropolitan King County Council changed party control in 2003 (becoming the first minority party member to serve in Council leadership). Currently, von Reichbauer serves on the Metropolitan King County Council as Chair of the Regional Policy Committee, as well as vice-chair of the Transportation, Economy and Environment Committee. He also serves on the Committee of the Whole, the Government Accountability and Oversight Committee and sits on the board of directors for Sound Transit. He formerly served as Chair of the Regional Transit Committee.

Since 2006, von Reichbauer has served as chair of the King County Regional Policy Committee. Since 2013, he has also served as chair of the King County Government Accountability and Oversight Committee.

In 2008, von Reichbauer spearheaded a movement to make the King County Council, the County Executive, and the Assessor nonpartisan offices. On November 4, 2008, voters supported the measure, and all elective offices of King County became nonpartisan.

== Seattle Seahawks ==
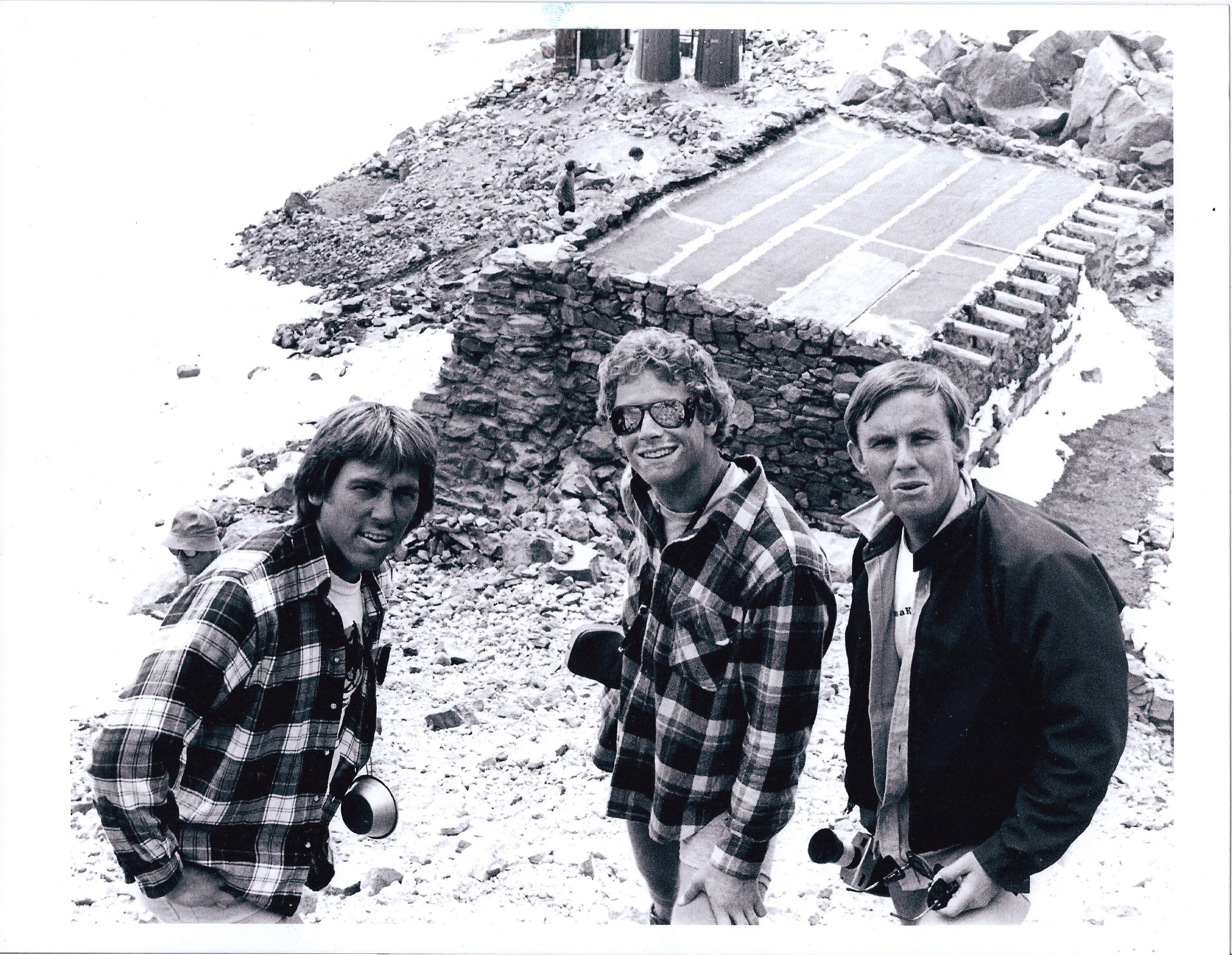
Jim Zorn, Steve Largent and Pete von Reichbauer after climbing Mount Rainier

In addition to his service as an elected official, von Reichbauer played a key role in keeping the Seattle Seahawks in Seattle. In late 1995, then-Seahawks owner Ken Behring told von Reichbauer privately that he wanted to sell the team and asked von Reichbauer to gauge interest in potential buyers. But publicly, Behring insisted he would not sell the team and began the process of moving the team to Los Angeles. By early 1996, von Reichbauer had identified Microsoft co-founder and Seattle-area resident Paul Allen as a potential buyer of the team. Von Reichbauer met with Allen's inner circle and convinced Allen that Behring was sincere about selling the team. As Allen became more serious about purchasing the team, he never negotiated directly with Behring; instead, von Reichbauer acted as an intermediary between Behring and Allen. Allen eventually agreed to purchase the team, contingent upon approval of a new stadium. For his efforts, the Seattle Times called him "one of the heroes in this fight," while former King County Executive Ron Sims has said that von Reichbauer "did a fantastic job keeping the Seahawks in Seattle. I don't believe it would've happened without his intervention."

== Personal life ==
In addition to his positions in public office, Pete von Reichbauer served as a founding board member the Boys and Girls Club of Federal Way, a board member of St. Francis Hospital, and President of the Kiwanis Club. Public directory listings indicate he maintains a residence in Scottsdale, Arizona.
