= Paul Barden (politician) =

American politician

Member of the King County Council from the 7th district
- In office January 1, 1974 – January 1, 1994
- Preceded by: Ed Munro
- Succeeded by: Pete von Reichbauer

Member of the Washington House of Representatives from the 30th district
- In office January 9, 1967 – January 8, 1973
- Preceded by: Frank J. Warnke
- Succeeded by: Bob Gaines

Personal details
- Born: August 29, 1936 (age 89)
- Party: Republican

Paul Barden (born August 29, 1936) is an American politician who served as a member of the King County Council from 1974 to 1994. A member of the Republican Party, he represented the 7th district.
