= Julia Patterson =

American politician

Chair of the King County Council
- In office January 7, 2008 – January 12, 2009
- Preceded by: Larry Gossett
- Succeeded by: Dow Constantine

Member of King County Council
- In office January 1, 2002 – January 1, 2014
- Preceded by: Les Thomas
- Succeeded by: Dave Upthegrove
- Constituency: District 13 (2002–2006); District 2 (2006–2014)

Member of the Washington Senate from the 33rd district
- In office January 6, 1997 – November 21, 2001
- Preceded by: Adam Smith
- Succeeded by: Karen Keiser

Member of the Washington House of Representatives from the 33rd district
- In office February 1, 1993 – January 6, 1997
- Preceded by: Lorraine Hine
- Succeeded by: John "Rod" Blalock

Personal details
- Born: December 1, 1953 (age 72)
- Party: Democratic
- Spouse: Patrick L. Patterson
- Education: Washington State University (BA); University of Washington (BA)
- Website: Official

Julia L. Patterson (born December 1, 1953) is an American politician from Washington. She is a former member of the King County Council, Washington State Senate, Washington House of Representatives, and the SeaTac city council.

== Education ==
Patterson earned two Bachelor of Arts degrees, from the University of Washington and Washington State University.

== Career ==
Patterson began her political career by assisting in the effort to incorporate the City of SeaTac, Washington. In 1989, she was elected as a founding member of the SeaTac City Council. Subsequently, she served three terms as a state representative and two as a state senator in the Washington State Legislature, representing the 33rd Legislative District.

For 12 years, Patterson served as a member of the King County Council, representing District Five, which consists of portions of South King County, including Kent, Des Moines, Burien, Seatac, and Renton. Patterson also served as a Sound Transit board member and chair of the Transportation Policy Board of the Puget Sound Regional Council.

In 2013, Patterson announced she would not run for a fourth term on the King County Council. In 2004, Patterson was nominated to serve on the Washington State Gambling Commission. She served as vice chair of the commission, and her term expired in 2024.

Patterson has written several op-ed columns for The Seattle Times.
