= Ron Sims =

American politician (born 1948)

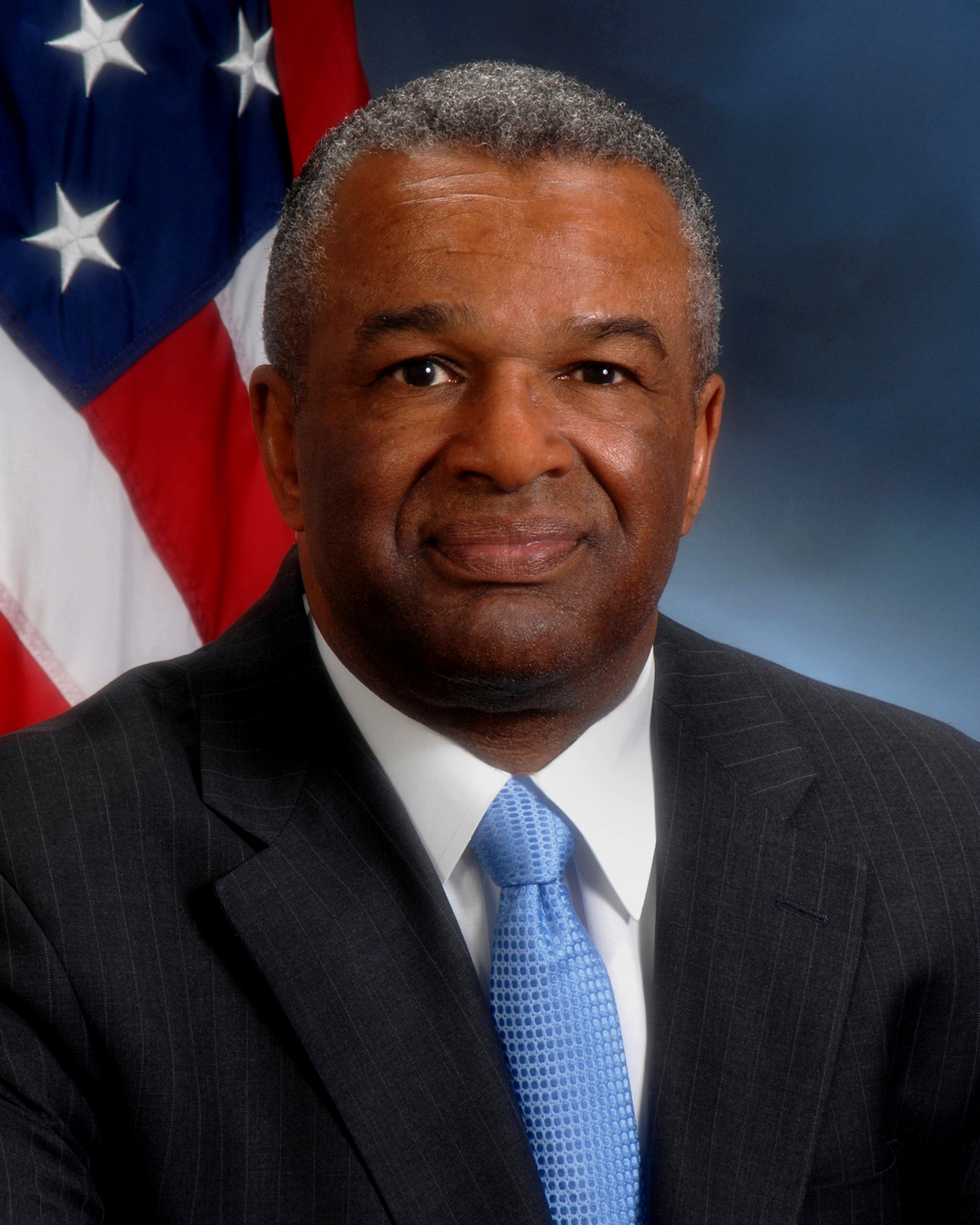

7th United States Deputy Secretary of Housing and Urban Development
- In office May 8, 2009 – July 31, 2011
- President: Barack Obama
- Preceded by: Roy Bernardi
- Succeeded by: Maurice Jones

6th King County Executive
- In office January 15, 1997 – May 8, 2009
- Preceded by: Gary Locke
- Succeeded by: Kurt Triplett (acting)

Member of the King County Council from the 5th district
- In office January 1, 1986 – January 15, 1997
- Preceded by: Ruby Chow
- Succeeded by: Dwight Pelz

Personal details
- Born: Ronald Cordell Sims; July 5, 1948 (age 78) Spokane, Washington, U.S.
- Party: Democratic
- Spouse: Cayan Topacio
- Children: 3
- Education: Central Washington University (BA)
- Website: County website

Ronald Cordell Sims (born July 5, 1948) is the former deputy secretary of the United States Department of Housing and Urban Development, having served in the position from May 8, 2009 to July 2011. He is also a former King County executive and councilmember, and he is the first Black person to hold each role in Washington. Sims ran unsuccessfully for higher office twice: United States senator in 1994 and governor of Washington in 2004.

== Early life ==
Sims was born in Spokane, Washington, to Reverend James C. Sims Sr. and Lydia T. Sims. He graduated from Lewis and Clark High School and attended Central Washington University in Ellensburg, where he earned a B.A. in psychology. Between graduation and his election to the King County Council he worked in the office of the Washington State Attorney General, for the Federal Trade Commission, for the juvenile offenders program of the city of Seattle, and as an aide in the state senate. He is an ordained Baptist minister.

== Political career ==
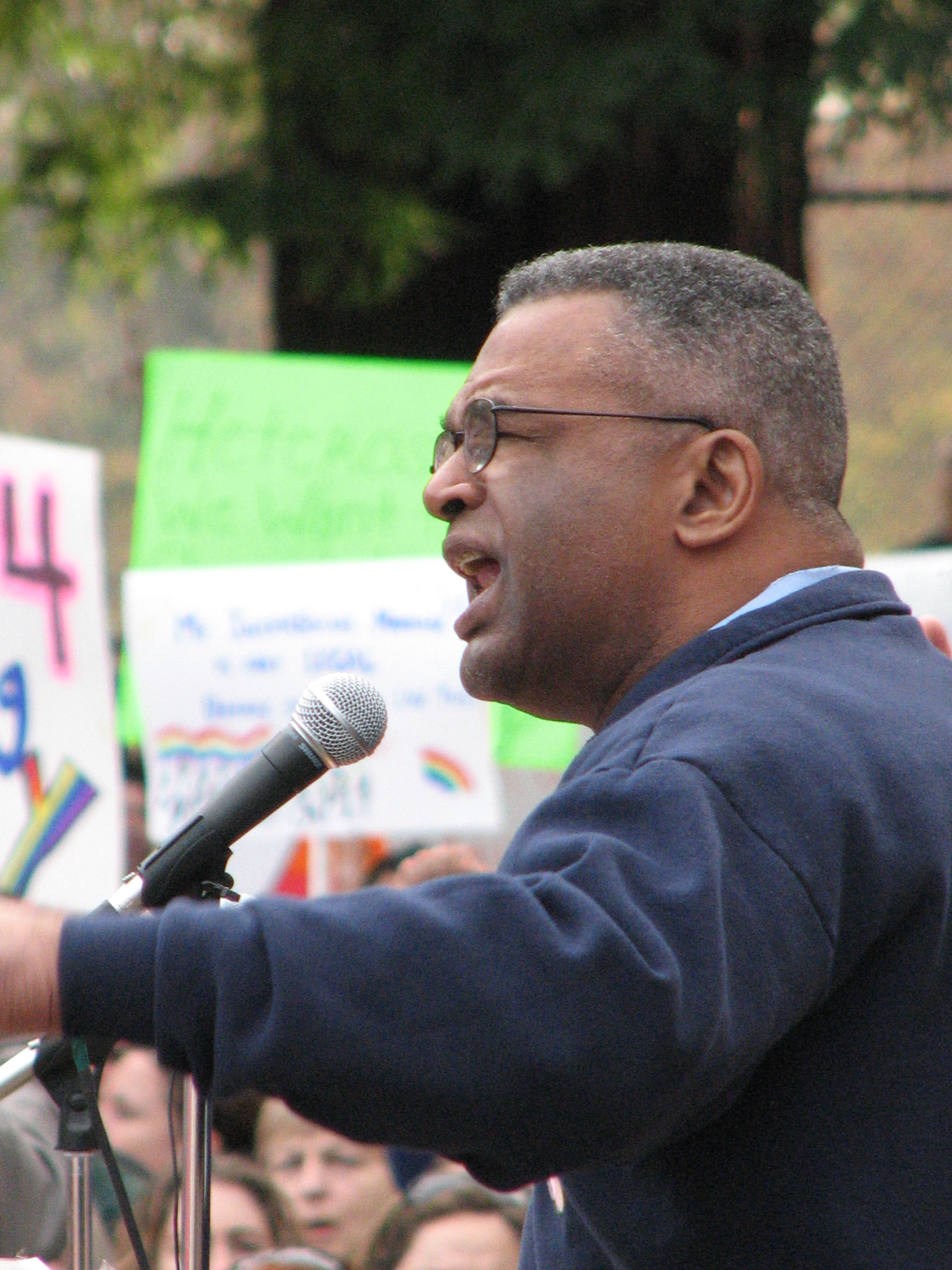
Sims speaking at a Proposition 8 protest in Seattle

In 1981, Sims ran for King County Council against incumbent Ruby Chow but lost. He was then elected to the King County Council in 1985 and reelected in 1989 and 1993. His 1985 election made him the first Black person elected to county-level government in Washington State.

During Sims' first term, he and fellow Councilman Bruce Laing led a campaign that saw the county rededicate its name, in 1986, to honor Martin Luther King Jr., rather than original namesake and slaveowner William R. King, who had been elected as Vice President of the United States just prior to the 1852 creation of the county. (The namesake change was legally enshrined by Washington state in 2005.) Both councilmen received opposition for the change, including enough threatening letters that the FBI took interest, but religious leaders supported the change, like Reverend Dr. Samuel B. McKinney and Rabbi Raphael Levine. Their proposal passed the council 5-4.

In 1994, he was defeated by Republican incumbent Slade Gorton in an election for the United States Senate. Sims lost by ten percentage points, but he had the best performance of any Democratic Senate candidate against a Republican incumbent in the U.S. that year.

In 1996, Sims was appointed King County Executive after the previous holder of the office, Gary Locke, was elected governor of Washington. Sims was re-elected in 1997, 2001 and 2005. He became the first Black King County Executive, as well as one of the first few Black heads of a county in the U.S. He was also the first King County councilmember to become executive in several decades.

On July 29, 2003, he announced that he would seek the Democratic nomination for Washington state governor in the 2004 election. Sims made news in the campaign when he proposed replacing the state sales tax and business and occupation tax with a progressively graduated income tax. In the primary election held on September 14, 2004, Sims lost to state Attorney General Christine Gregoire.

On February 2, 2009, President Barack Obama nominated Sims to become Deputy Secretary of the US Department of Housing and Urban Development, being confirmed by the United States Senate on May 6, 2009 and sworn in on May 8, 2009.

On June 14, 2011, less than two years after accepting his HUD appointment, Sims announced his resignation and intent to return to Seattle, citing a desire to spend more time with his family. Sims' announcement followed the release of official travel records to Americans for Limited Government that showed Sims had spent 45 of 128 travel days during his tenure on trips to Seattle, a statistic that the group said raised "questions about the legitimacy of these trips." A HUD spokesperson responded that the trips were legal and appropriate, noting that "every trip taken by Deputy Secretary Ron Sims was in response to a formal speech or forum participation request."

== King County issues ==
=== Brightwater sewage treatment plant ===
The Brightwater sewage treatment plant built by King County across the county line in neighboring Snohomish County caused a number of issues, including a lawsuit between the counties over impact mitigation; cost overruns; and concerns over earthquake fault lines running through the site.

=== Tent City 4 ===
On April 29, 2004, Sims announced his intention to temporarily locate a tent city on county-owned land near Bothell, Washington and gave the King County Council 90 days to determine a more permanent location within the county for the tent city to be located. Opponents of the plan filed a lawsuit that resulted in the move being cancelled. In May 2005, the council voted to have a one-year moratorium prohibiting the siting of homeless encampments on public land pending a review of the availability, suitability, and appropriateness of using county-owned land. Sims never conducted this review, and the moratorium remains in place, but the homeless encampment is currently moving from church property to church property throughout east King County.

=== Critical Area Ordinance ===
On October 26, 2004, the King County Council passed the controversial Critical Area Ordinance (CAO) to protect environmentally sensitive areas (such as wetlands and streams) and restrict development in hazardous areas (such as floodplains and landslide prone steep slopes). The plan drew the ire of many property rights groups, rural landowners, and developers as the ordinance prevented land owners from developing areas of their property that met the critical area definition. This included a requirement that landowners in rural areas that haven't already cleared their land must keep 50% to 65% of their property in its "natural state". Three referendums to repeal the ordinance gathered over 17,000 signatures each, far more than the 6,900 required to qualify to be on the ballot. However, a lawsuit filed by King County and a pro-growth management group prevented the referendum from being put on the ballot, and the state Supreme Court ruled that a state law requiring local governments to protect critical areas prevented local referendums from overturning critical area ordinances. On July 7, 2008, a Washington State Appeals Court found that the portion of the CAO known as the clearing and grading ordinance is an indirect and illegal "tax, fee, or charge", and that prior to restricting the clearing of land for lawn or pasture, King County must demonstrate how that act could cause harm.

=== Rails to trails proposal ===
On May 16, 2005, Sims announced a controversial plan to purchase the 47-mile (76 km) Woodinville Subdivision railroad that runs through the east King County roughly parallel to Interstate 405 and replace most of its track with a bicycle trail. Although there is support for purchasing the railroad in order to prevent its current owner, BNSF Railway, from selling off the right of way piecemeal, the plan to remove the tracks has raised concerns from rail transportation advocates, environmental groups, and the owners, employees and customers of the popular Spirit of Washington dinner train (which ran on the tracks). It has also resulted in the formation of a grassroots movement, Eastside Rail Now!, which is aimed at stopping the removal of the tracks and at using them to begin a rail transit service in addition to their current freight and dinner train functions. In 2007, the Port of Seattle, King County, and BNSF signed a preliminary agreement in which the Port would purchase the rail line from BNSF and then exchange the line plus $66 million to pay for removal of the tracks and replacement by a bicycle trail for Boeing Field

=== Boeing Field airlines proposal ===
In July 2005, Southwest Airlines formally proposed plans to spend $130 million on a passenger terminal and other facilities and move the airline's operation from Sea-Tac Airport to Boeing Field after several months of negotiations with Sims. The proposal from Southwest prompted Alaska Airlines to announce it would seek a similar agreement with the county. The proposals were met with opposition from residents of Georgetown, the Seattle neighborhood north of Boeing Field, many of Washington's state and federal legislators, and the Seattle Chamber of Commerce. After months of pressure from the opposition, Sims killed Southwest's and Alaska's proposals in October 2005, stating that while the area around Boeing Field might have been able to support Southwest's bid with only minor road improvements, it could not support both the Southwest and Alaska proposals without major infrastructure improvements.

=== Armen Yousoufian and Qwest Field ===
On May 30, 1997 Armen Yousoufian, the owner of the University Plaza Hotel in Seattle, requested documents from Sims’ office concerning the upcoming election (June 17, 1997) about and financing documents for Seattle’s Qwest Field. It took Sims's office nearly four years to provide Yousoufian with the documents. Yousoufian eventually sued to be given the documents, and was also awarded five dollars a day for the delay, plus $87,000 in attorneys’ fees. In 2005, after further appeal by Yousoufian, the amount was increased to 15 dollars a day, bringing the total to $122,000, plus a further $171,000 in attorneys’ fees, which some claim to be the highest such fine ever assessed in state history. Yousoufian appealed further, and in January 2009 a divided Washington Supreme Court agreed that the $15 a day fine was insufficient. Two justices recommended that the King County Superior Court award $100 a day, the maximum provided for under the law.

== Personal ==
Sims and his wife, Cayan Topacio, live in the Mount Baker neighborhood of Seattle. They have three sons: Douglas, Daniel, and Aaron.

== See also ==
- List of African-American United States Senate candidates

Political offices
Preceded by Ruby Chow	Member of the King County Council from the 5th district 1986–1997	Succeeded by Dwight Pelz
Preceded by Gary Locke	Executive of King County; 1997–2009	Succeeded by Kurt Triplett; Acting
Preceded by Roy Bernardi	United States Deputy Secretary of Housing and Urban Development; 2009–2011	Succeeded by Maurice Jones
Party political offices
Preceded by Mike Lowry	Democratic nominee for U.S. Senator from Washington (Class 1); 1994	Succeeded by Maria Cantwell
