= Sarah Perry (politician) =

American politician

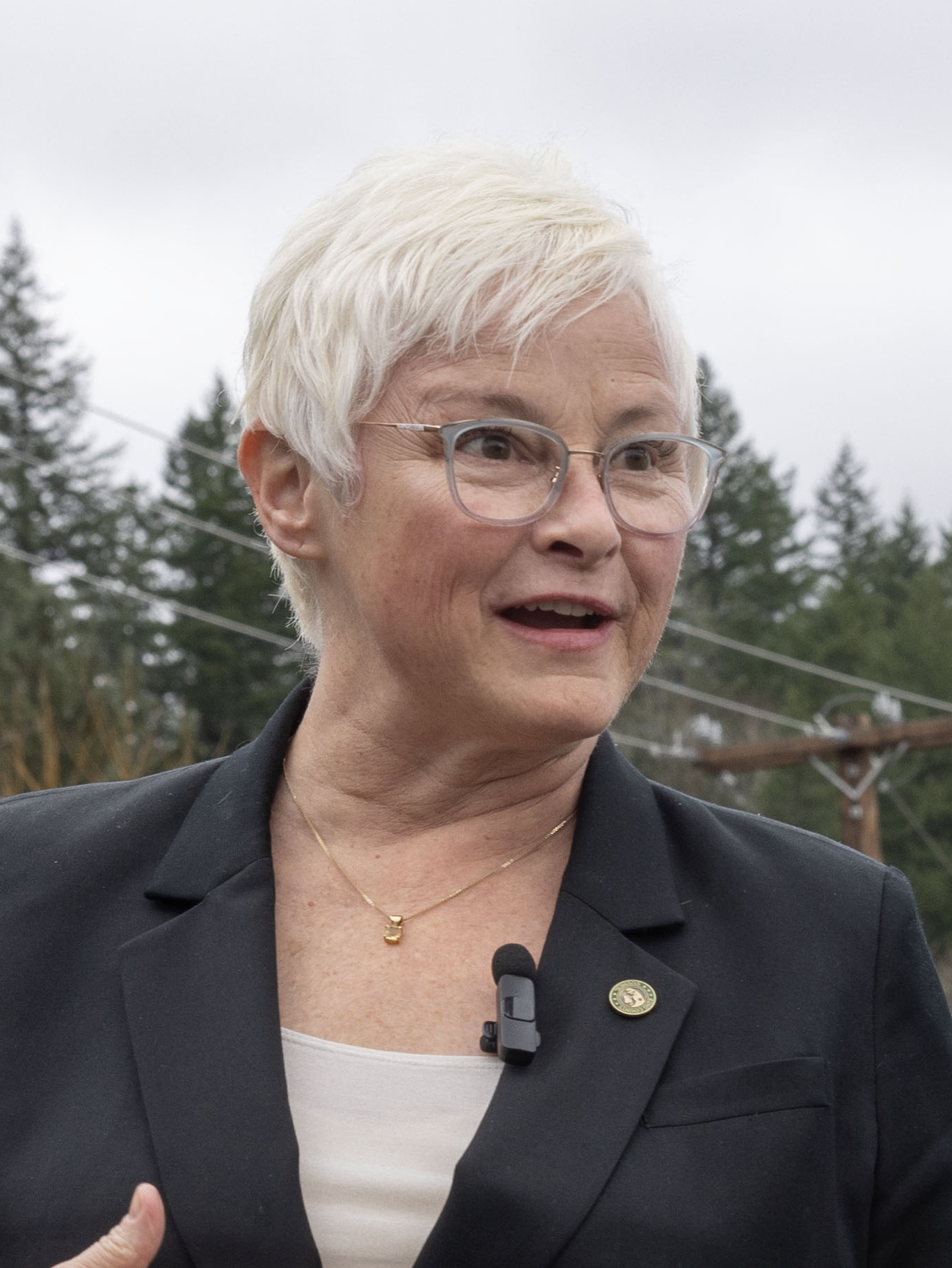
- Perry in 2024

Member of the King County Council from the 3rd district
- Incumbent
- Assumed office January 1, 2022
- Preceded by: Kathy Lambert

Personal details
- Party: Democratic
- Spouse: Bill Ramos
- Children: 2
- Education: Seattle University, Ohio State University (BA)

Sarah Perry is an American politician elected to the King County Council in 2022. Before running for office, Perry worked at various nonprofits and nongovernmental organizations, including Eastside Housing and Seattle University.

== King County Council ==
=== 2021 election ===
In her fifth reelection bid, Republican incumbent Kathy Lambert faced two challengers, Perry and lawyer Joe Cohen. Perry focused her campaign on targeted urban growth while protecting farmlands, greater access to public transit, and economic support for small businesses. Lambert focused on her record as a councilmember, including legislation addressing homeless and the creation of the Department of Local Services. In the August primary, Lambert and Perry earned 40% and 36% of the vote, respectively, and advanced to the general election.

During the general election, Lambert sent an election mailer to constituents, which portrayed Perry as a marionette controlled by councilmember Girmay Zahilay and accused her of "bringing radical Seattle policies to the Eastside." The mailer was condemned as racist and many of Lambert's supporters and donors withdrew their support, such as the Seattle Mariners who announced they donated $1,000 to Perry after condemning the mailer. Lambert at first defended the mailer saying the mailer was meant to highlight the differences between her and Perry, but then apologized saying, "This message is certainly not what was intended."

Perry defeated Lambert 55.81% to 43.86% in the November general election.

=== Tenure ===
During a March 2024 Health and Human Services Committee meeting, a group of Venezuelan asylum seekers showed up to seek help with paying for housing at a Kent Quality Inn or face eviction. After the meeting, Perry worked to see if she could find financial help from community members and the Redmond-based Muslim Association of Puget Sound (MAPS) donated $60,000 to pay for two weeks at the hotel.

== Personal life ==
Perry attended both Seattle University and Ohio State University studying transformational leadership and political science. She was married to Washington State representative Bill Ramos, whom she helped win through creating a 150 volunteer group. They had two children together.
