= King County Council =

Legislative body of King County, Washington, US

Metropolitan King County Council
- King County, Washington

Type
- Type: County Council of the King County, WA

Leadership
- Chair: Sarah Perry (D)
- Vice Chair: Reagan Dunn (R)
- Vice Chair: Jorge L. Barón (D)

Structure
- Seats: 9
- Political groups: Officially nonpartisan: Democratic (7); Republican (2)
- Committees: List of Committees: Budget and Fiscal Management; Committee of the Whole; Government Accountability and Oversight; Employment and Administration; Health, Housing and Human Services; Law and Justice; Transportation, Economy and Environment; Regional Policy; Regional Transit; Regional Water Quality
- Length of term: 4 years

Elections
- Last election: November 4, 2025
- Next election: November 3, 2026

Meeting place
- 1200 King County Courthouse; 516 Third Avenue; Seattle, Washington 98104

Website
- King County Council

The Metropolitan King County Council, the legislative body of King County, Washington, consists of nine members elected by district. The county council adopts laws, sets policy, and holds final approval over the budget. Its current name and structure is the result of a merger of King County and the Municipality of Metropolitan Seattle, better known as Metro, which was a federated county-city structure responsible for water quality and public transportation.

== Councilmembers ==
As a result of a county charter amendment passed by voters in the November 2008 elections, all elective offices of King County are officially nonpartisan, though all current council members generally associate closely with one of the two major US political parties.

District	Member	Party	Took Office
District 1	Rod Dembowski	Dem	Mar 5, 2013
District 2	Rhonda Lewis	Dem	Dec 9, 2025
District 3	Sarah Perry	Dem	Jan 1, 2022
District 4	Jorge Barón	Dem	Jan 1, 2024
District 5	Steffanie Fain	Dem	Nov 25, 2025
District 6	Claudia Balducci	Dem	Jan 1, 2016
District 7	Pete von Reichbauer	Rep	Jan 1, 1994
District 8	Teresa Mosqueda	Dem	Jan 1, 2024
District 9	Reagan Dunn	Rep	2005

== Meetings ==
The full county council meets weekly on Thursdays, except for the fifth Thursday in a month. Public comments are permitted at the fourth meeting of the month. Meetings are held in the County Council chambers, Room 1001, on the tenth floor of the King County Courthouse in Downtown Seattle.

== Structure ==
The nine members of the council are elected by their district to four-year terms in nonpartisan contests. Councilmembers in even numbered districts are up for election in even years without a US Presidential election starting in 2026, while Councilmembers in odd districts are up for election in years with a US presidential election starting in 2028.

The King County Executive is not a member of the Council, and is a separately elected official. The Executive submits legislation to the Council for consideration. Each year in October, the Executive submits a proposed budget to the County Council for the operation of County government for the coming year. The Executive has veto power over ordinances passed by the Council.

=== Committees ===
The Council uses its committee structure to consider the legislation before it. Ordinances and motions (policy statements) are assigned to a King County Council committee for consideration, and then are recommended to the full Council for action. Each year, the Council reorganizes and elects a Chair and Vice Chair. In addition, the Council decides yearly on its committee structure and makeup.

There are nine standing policy committees and three regional committees. Members of the Seattle City Council and representatives from suburban cities and local sewer districts are also members of the regional committees. In addition, all nine members of the Council meet as a Committee of the Whole to discuss broad-reaching legislation and issues.

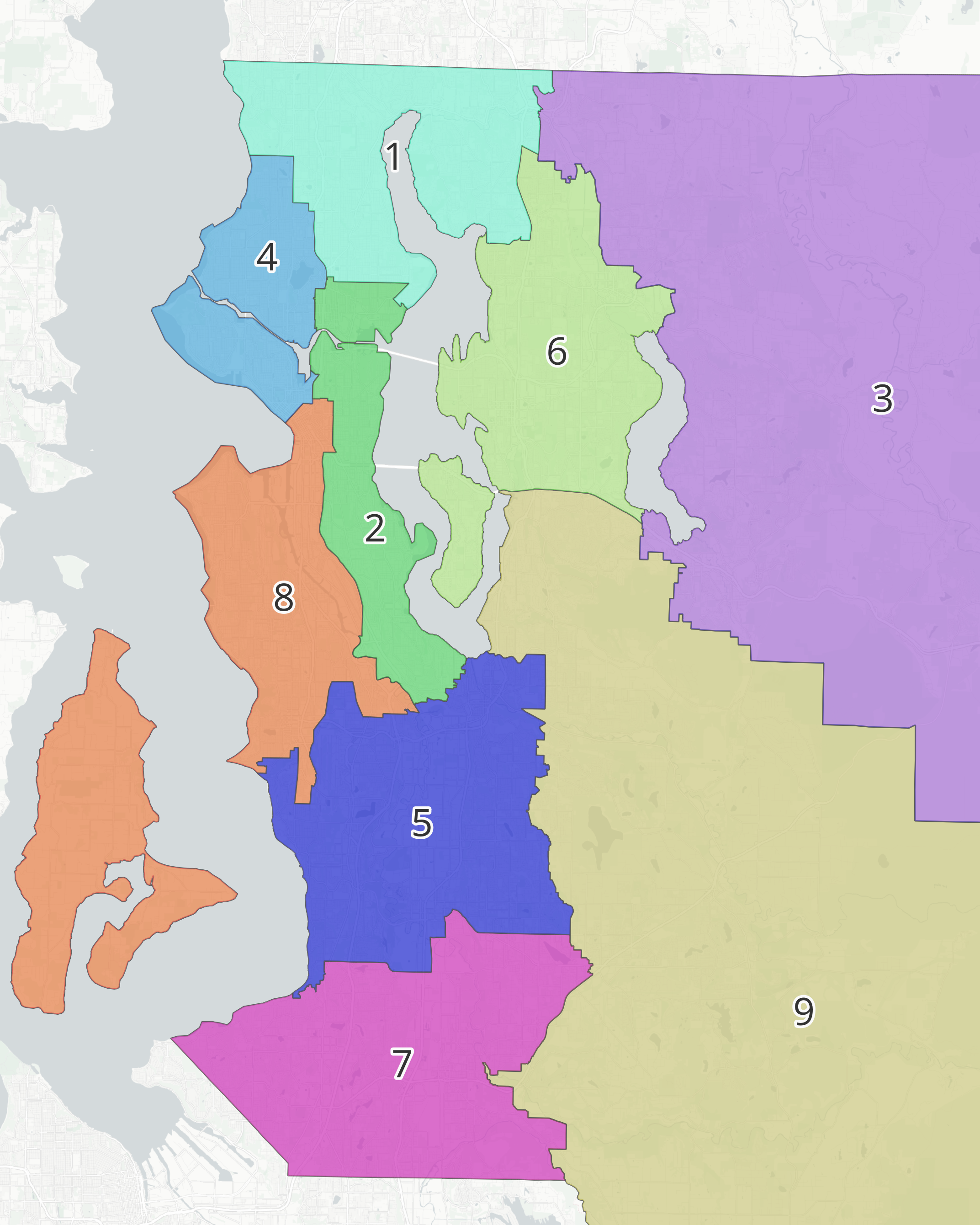
District boundaries after 2020 census redistricting

=== Redistricting ===
County Council districts are redrawn in the year following the decennial US Census by a five-person redistricting commission using a similar model to the Washington State Redistricting Commission. The council appoints four redistricting commission members, two from each of the two major parties who then elect the fifth member who is also the chair. The redistricting commission must appoint a Districting Master by April 1st who must submit a plan to the commission by December 31st of a year ending in 1. The redistricting commission can amend the plan, but must approve the maps within 15 days.

== History ==
=== King County Commission ===
In December 1852, King County was formed from a piece of Oregon Territory's Pierce County. Washington Territory was established in March 1853 via a federal organic act, allowing Washington to define how counties would be governed. The territory decided that each county should elect three-member Boards of Commissioners, who passed county laws in the form of resolutions and discussed policy via proceedings.

In 1948 Washington State passed a law allowing for counties to change their governance structures. This allowed King County citizens to vote to change their commissioners board into the nine-member King County Council in 1968. Voters passed the King County Home Rule Charter in an attempt to reform their government in reaction to political scandals. They were the first county in Washington to adopt a home rule charter. The same vote also established the position of King County Executive. The final three commissioners were John Spellman, Ed Munro, and John O'Brien.

=== King County Council ===
80 people ran for the new King County Council, and three of the candidates were women. The first King County Council was sworn in on May 1, 1969. The new council passed laws via ordinances and set policy via motions.

Of the nine original councilmembers, Bernice Stern became the first woman on the King County Council. In 1974, Ruby Chow became the first Asian American and second woman elected to the Council. In 1986, Ron Sims became the first African American elected to the council. In 2025, Rhonda Lewis became the first Black woman to be a member of the council. The appointment of Councilmember Lewis in 2025 also marked the first time that a majority of the King County Council members were women.

=== Notable charter changes ===
The council was expanded from nine to thirteen members in 1993. In the 2004 general election voters approved a charter amendment to reduce the size of the council from thirteen to nine, which went into effect January 1, 2006. With four fewer districts, the number of constituents per district rose from 138,000 residents to about 193,000.

Prior to 2009, councilmembers were elected on a partisan basis, and had to declare their political party unless they filed as an Independent. An independent candidate had to receive at least 20 percent of the vote in the primary election to qualify for the general election ballot. This changed upon the passage of Charter Amendment 8 by voters in 2008, which made all elections for county offices nonpartisan.

In 2022, Charter Amendment 1 was passed by King County voters with 69% in favor and 31% opposed. The passage of this amendment moved elections for King County Council from odd to even years and shortened the term of councilmembers elected in the 2023 and 2025 elections from the normal four-year term to a three-year term to accommodate the shift. Prior to the passage of this amendment, elections for councilmembers in even numbered districts were up for election in years preceding US presidential elections, while councilmembers in odd districts were up for election in years following US presidential elections.

== Past councilmembers ==
As of 2025

District	Councilmember	Political party (Note: Although county offices in King County were made officially nonpartisan in 2008, all councillors have made their party affiliations a matter of public record.)	Term start	Term end
1	Tracy Owen	Republican	1969	1981
2	Bob Dunn	Republican	1969	1979
3	Bill Reams	Republican	1969	1989
4	Bernice Stern	Democratic	1969	1980
5	John O'Brien	Republican	1969	1973
6	Tom Forsythe	Republican	1969	1975
7	Ed Munro	Democratic	1969	1973
8	Ed Heavey	Democratic	1969	1975
9	Dave Mooney	Democratic	1969	1976
5	Ruby Chow	Democratic	1974	1985
7	Paul Barden	Republican	1974	1993
6	Mike Lowry	Democratic	1976	1979
8	Bob Greive	Democratic	1976	1987
9	Bob Gaines	Democratic	1977	1977
9	Gary Grant	Democratic	1978	1990
6	Pat Thorpe	Democratic	1979	1979
2	Scott Blair	Republican	1980	1983
4	Lois North	Republican	1980	1992
6	Bruce Laing	Republican	1980	1996
1	Audrey Gruger	Democratic	1982	1993
2	Cynthia Sullivan	Democratic	1984	2003
5	Ron Sims	Democratic	1986	1997
8	Greg Nickels	Democratic	1988	2001
3	Brian Derdowski	Republican	1990	1999
9	Kent Pullen	Republican	1990	2003
4	Larry Phillips	Democratic	1992	2015
1	Maggi Fimia	Democratic	1994	2001
3	Louise Miller	Republican	1994	2001
10	Larry Gossett	Democratic	1994	2019
11	Jane Hague	Republican	1994	2015
13	Chris Vance	Republican	1994	2001
6	Rob McKenna	Republican	1996	2005
5	Dwight Pelz	Democratic	1997	2005
12	David Irons	Republican	2000	2005
13	Les Thomas	Republican	2001	2001
1	Carolyn Edmonds	Democratic	2002	2005
3	Kathy Lambert	Republican	2002	2021
13	Julia Patterson	Democratic	2002	2013
8	Dow Constantine	Democratic	2002	2009
9	Steve Hammond	Republican	2003	2005
2	Bob Ferguson	Democratic	2004	2013
8	Jan Drago	Democratic	2010	2010
8	Joe McDermott	Democratic	2011	2024
4	Jeanne Kohl-Welles	Democratic	2016	2024
5	Dave Upthegrove	Democratic	2014	2025
2	Girmay Zahilay	Democratic	2020	2025
5	De'Sean Quinn	Democratic	2025	2025

Table of councilmembers
Year	Dist. 1	Dist. 2	Dist. 3	Dist. 4	Dist. 5	Dist. 6	Dist. 7	Dist. 8	Dist. 9	Dist. 10	Dist. 11	Dist. 12	Dist. 13
1969	Tracy Owen	Bob Dunn	Bill Reams	Bernice Stern	John O'Brien	Tom Forsythe	Ed Munro	Ed Heavey	Dave Mooney				
1974	Tracy Owen	Bob Dunn	Bill Reams	Bernice Stern	Ruby Chow	Tom Forsythe	Paul Barden	Ed Heavey	Dave Mooney				
1976	Tracy Owen	Bob Dunn	Bill Reams	Bernice Stern	Ruby Chow	Mike Lowry	Paul Barden	Bob Greive	Dave Mooney				
1977	Tracy Owen	Bob Dunn	Bill Reams	Bernice Stern	Ruby Chow	Mike Lowry	Paul Barden	Bob Greive	Bob Gaines (Note: Appointed after Dave Mooney resigned to take a state appointment.)				
1978	Tracy Owen	Bob Dunn	Bill Reams	Bernice Stern	Ruby Chow	Mike Lowry	Paul Barden	Bob Greive	Gary Grant				
1979	Tracy Owen	Bob Dunn	Bill Reams	Bernice Stern	Ruby Chow	Pat Thorpe (Note: Appointed after Mike Lowry was elected to the United States House of Representatives.)	Paul Barden	Bob Greive	Gary Grant				
1980	Tracy Owen	Scott Blair	Bill Reams	Lois North	Ruby Chow	Bruce Lanig	Paul Barden	Bob Greive	Gary Grant				
1982	Audrey Gruger	Scott Blair	Bill Reams	Lois North	Ruby Chow	Bruce Lanig	Paul Barden	Bob Greive	Gary Grant				
1984	Audrey Gruger	Cynthia Sullivan	Bill Reams	Lois North	Ruby Chow	Bruce Lanig	Paul Barden	Bob Greive	Gary Grant				
1986	Audrey Gruger	Cynthia Sullivan	Bill Reams	Lois North	Ron Sims	Bruce Lanig	Paul Barden	Bob Greive	Gary Grant				
1988	Audrey Gruger	Cynthia Sullivan	Bill Reams	Lois North	Ron Sims	Bruce Lanig	Paul Barden	Greg Nickels	Gary Grant				
1990	Audrey Gruger	Cynthia Sullivan	Brian Berdowski	Lois North	Ron Sims	Bruce Lanig	Paul Barden	Greg Nickels	Kent Pullen				
1992	Audrey Gruger	Cynthia Sullivan	Brian Berdowski	Larry Phillips	Ron Sims	Bruce Lanig	Paul Barden	Greg Nickels	Kent Pullen				
1994	Maggi Fimia	Cynthia Sullivan	Louise Miller	Larry Phillips	Ron Sims	Bruce Lanig	Pete von Reichbauer	Greg Nickels	Kent Pullen	Larry Gossett	Jane Hague	Brian Derdowski	Chris Vance
1996	Maggi Fimia	Cynthia Sullivan	Louise Miller	Larry Phillips	Ron Sims	Rob McKenna	Pete von Reichbauer	Greg Nickels	Kent Pullen	Larry Gossett	Jane Hague	Brian Derdowski	Chris Vance
1997	Maggi Fimia	Cynthia Sullivan	Louise Miller	Larry Phillips	Dwight Pelz (Note: Appointed after Ron Sims resigned to replace Gary Locke as King County Executive.)	Rob McKenna	Pete von Reichbauer	Greg Nickels	Kent Pullen	Larry Gossett	Jane Hague	Brian Derdowski	Chris Vance
2000	Maggi Fimia	Cynthia Sullivan	Louise Miller	Larry Phillips	Dwight Pelz	Rob McKenna	Pete von Reichbauer	Greg Nickels	Kent Pullen	Larry Gossett	Jane Hague	David Irons	Chris Vance
2001	Maggi Fimia	Cynthia Sullivan	Louise Miller	Larry Phillips	Dwight Pelz	Rob McKenna	Pete von Reichbauer	Greg Nickels	Kent Pullen	Larry Gossett	Jane Hague	David Irons	Les Thomas (Note: Appointed after Chris Vance resigned to become chair of the Washington State Republican Party.)
2002	Carolyn Edmonds	Cynthia Sullivan	Kathy Lambert	Larry Phillips	Dwight Pelz	Rob McKenna	Pete von Reichbauer	Dow Constantine (Note: Appointed after Greg Nickels was elected as mayor of Seattle.)	Kent Pullen	Larry Gossett	Jane Hague	David Irons	Julia Patterson
2003	Carolyn Edmonds	Cynthia Sullivan	Kathy Lambert	Larry Phillips	Dwight Pelz	Rob McKenna	Pete von Reichbauer	Dow Constantine	Kent Pullen	Larry Gossett	Jane Hague	David Irons	Julia Patterson
2003	Carolyn Edmonds	Cynthia Sullivan	Kathy Lambert	Larry Phillips	Dwight Pelz	Rob McKenna	Pete von Reichbauer	Dow Constantine	Steve Hammond (Note: Appointed after Kent Pullen died in office.)	Larry Gossett	Jane Hague	David Irons	Julia Patterson
2004	Carolyn Edmonds	Bob Ferguson	Kathy Lambert	Larry Phillips	Dwight Pelz	Rob McKenna	Pete von Reichbauer	Dow Constantine	Steve Hammond	Larry Gossett	Jane Hague	David Irons	Julia Patterson
2005	Carolyn Edmonds	Bob Ferguson	Kathy Lambert	Larry Phillips	Dwight Pelz	Reagan Dunn (Note: Appointed after Rob McKenna was elected as Attorney General of Washington.)	Pete von Reichbauer	Dow Constantine	Steve Hammond	Larry Gossett	Jane Hague	David Irons	Julia Patterson
2006	Bob Ferguson	Larry Gossett	Kathy Lambert	Larry Phillips	Julia Patterson	Jane Hague	Pete von Reichbauer	Dow Constantine	Reagan Dunn				
2010	Bob Ferguson	Larry Gossett	Kathy Lambert	Larry Phillips	Julia Patterson	Jane Hague	Pete von Reichbauer	Jan Drago (Note: Appointed after Dow Constantine was elected as King County Executive.)	Reagan Dunn				
2010	Bob Ferguson	Larry Gossett	Kathy Lambert	Larry Phillips	Julia Patterson	Jane Hague	Pete von Reichbauer	Joe McDermott	Reagan Dunn				
2013	Rod Dembowski (Note: Appointed after Bob Ferguson was elected as Attorney General of Washington.)	Larry Gossett	Kathy Lambert	Larry Phillips	Julia Patterson	Jane Hague	Pete von Reichbauer	Joe McDermott	Reagan Dunn				
2014	Rod Dembowski	Larry Gossett	Kathy Lambert	Larry Phillips	Dave Upthegrove	Jane Hague	Pete von Reichbauer	Joe McDermott	Reagan Dunn				
2016	Rod Dembowski	Larry Gossett	Kathy Lambert	Jeanne Kohl-Welles	Dave Upthegrove	Claudia Balducci	Pete von Reichbauer	Joe McDermott	Reagan Dunn				
2020	Rod Dembowski	Girmay Zahilay	Kathy Lambert	Jeanne Kohl-Welles	Dave Upthegrove	Claudia Balducci	Pete von Reichbauer	Joe McDermott	Reagan Dunn				
2022	Rod Dembowski	Girmay Zahilay	Sarah Perry	Jeanne Kohl-Welles	Dave Upthegrove	Claudia Balducci	Pete von Reichbauer	Joe McDermott	Reagan Dunn				
2024	Rod Dembowski	Girmay Zahilay	Sarah Perry	Jorge Barón	Dave Upthegrove	Claudia Balducci	Pete von Reichbauer	Teresa Mosqueda	Reagan Dunn				
2025	Rod Dembowski	Girmay Zahilay	Sarah Perry	Jorge Barón	De'Sean Quinn (Note: Appointed after Dave Upthegrove was elected as Washington Public Lands Commissioner.)	Claudia Balducci	Pete von Reichbauer	Teresa Mosqueda	Reagan Dunn				
2025	Rod Dembowski	Girmay Zahilay	Sarah Perry	Jorge Barón	Steffanie Fain (Note: Elected Nov. 4, 2025 to serve unexpired term)	Claudia Balducci	Pete von Reichbauer	Teresa Mosqueda	Reagan Dunn				
2026	Rod Dembowski	Rhonda Lewis (Note: Appointed after Girmay Zahilay was elected as King County Executive.)	Sarah Perry	Jorge Barón	Steffanie Fain	Claudia Balducci	Pete von Reichbauer	Teresa Mosqueda	Reagan Dunn				
