= 2020 Washington Attorney General election =

- November 3, 2020
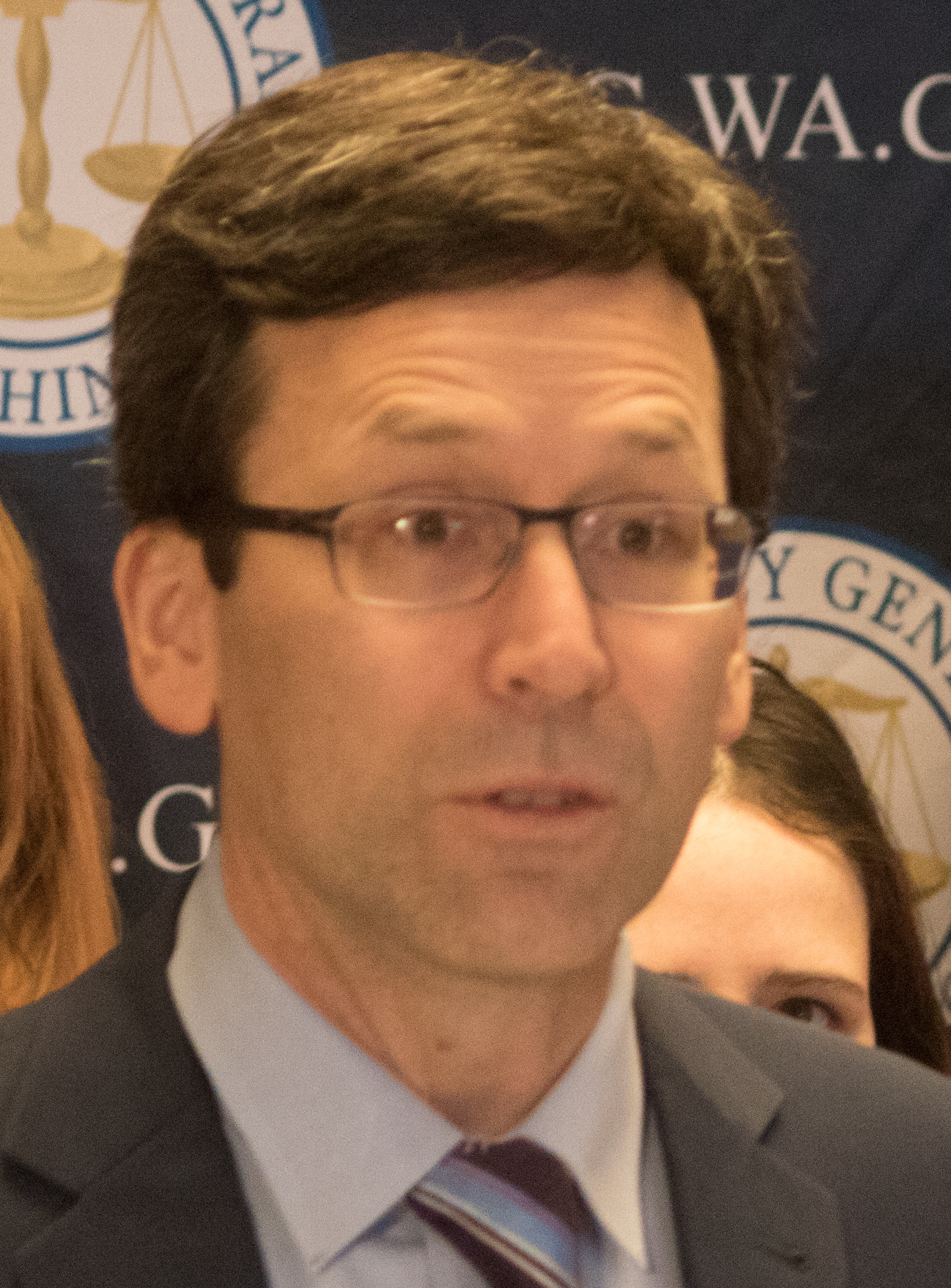

Nominee	Bob Ferguson	Matt Larkin
Party	Democratic	Republican
Popular vote	2,226,418	1,714,927
Percentage	56.43%	43.47%
- Ferguson: 50–60% 60–70% 70–80% 80–90% Larkin: 50–60% 60–70% 70–80%
Attorney General before election
Bob Ferguson
Democratic
Elected Attorney General
Bob Ferguson
Democratic

The 2020 Washington Attorney General election was held on November 3, 2020, to elect the attorney general of Washington, concurrently with the 2020 U.S. presidential election, as well as elections to the U.S. Senate and various state and local elections, including for U.S. House and governor of Washington. Incumbent Democratic Attorney General Bob Ferguson was re-elected to a third term in office.

== Background ==
Ferguson was first elected in 2012 against Republican King County Councilor Reagan Dunn, winning 53% of the vote to succeed Republican Rob McKenna. He was re-elected over Libertarian Joshua Trumbull in 2016 with 67% of the vote and was expected to easily win a third term.

== Candidates ==
Washington is one of two states that holds a top-two primary, meaning that all candidates are listed on the same ballot regardless of party affiliation, and the top two move on to the general election.

=== Democratic Party ===
==== Advanced to general ====
- Bob Ferguson, incumbent attorney general (2013–2025)

==== Declined ====
- Manka Dhingra, state senator
- Lorena González, Seattle City Councilor (endorsed Ferguson)
- Drew Hansen, state representative
- Noah Purcell, solicitor general of Washington

=== Republican Party ===
==== Advanced to general ====
- Matt Larkin, manufacturing executive and former Pierce County deputy prosecuting attorney

==== Eliminated in primary ====
- Brett Rogers, attorney
- Mike Vaska, attorney and leader of Mainstream Republicans of Washington (2017–2020)

== Primary election ==
=== Endorsements ===
Bob Ferguson (D)

Local officials

- Lorena González, Seattle City Councilor
Mike Vaska (R)

Statewide officials

- Rob McKenna, former attorney general of Washington (2005–2013)

=== Polling ===
Poll source	Date(s) administered	Sample size (Note: Key: A – all adults RV – registered voters LV – likely voters V – unclear)	Margin of error	Bob Ferguson (D)	Matt Larkin (R)	Brett Rogers (R)	Mike Vaska (R)	Undecided
SurveyUSA	July 22–27, 2020	513 (LV)	± 5.4%	52%	13%	7%	5%	22%
SurveyUSA	May 16–19, 2020	650 (LV)	± 5.6%	47%	8%	8%	4%	32%

=== Results ===
County results Ferguson: 30–40%; 40–50%; 50–60%; 60–70%; 70–80%; Larkin: 30–40%; Rogers: 30–40%

Congressional district results Ferguson: 40–50%; 50–60%; 70–80%; 80–90%; Larkin: 30–40%

Blanket primary election results
Party	Candidate	Votes	%
Democratic	Bob Ferguson (incumbent)	1,356,225	55.79%
Republican	Matt Larkin	575,470	23.67%
Republican	Brett Rogers	296,843	12.21%
Republican	Mike Vaska	199,826	8.22%
Write-in		2,372	0.10%
Total votes		2,430,736	100.00%

==== By county ====
Combined partisan vote by county Democratic: 50–60%; 60–70%; 70–80%; Republican: 40–50%; 50–60%; 60–70%; 70–80%

Combined partisan vote by congressional district Democratic: 50–60%; 70–80%; 80–90%; Republican: 50–60%; 60–70%

County results
County	Bob Ferguson Democratic		Matt Larkin Republican		Brett Rogers Republican		Mike Vaska Republican		Write-in Various		Margin		Total votes
County	#	%	#	%	#	%	#	%	#	%	#	%	Total votes
Adams	778	23.54%	1,114	33.71%	1,014	30.68%	398	12.04%	1	0.03%	-100	-3.03%	3,305
Asotin	2,388	35.88%	1,850	27.79%	1,856	27.88%	551	8.28%	11	0.17%	532	7.99%	6,656
Benton	20,523	33.81%	22,329	36.78%	12,797	21.08%	4,989	8.22%	69	0.11%	-1,806	-2.97%	60,707
Chelan	10,794	39.35%	9,666	35.23%	4,710	17.17%	2,238	8.16%	25	0.09%	1,128	4.11%	27,433
Clallam	16,101	50.44%	8,936	27.99%	4,083	12.79%	2,777	8.70%	27	0.08%	7,165	22.44%	31,924
Clark	74,320	49.89%	35,936	24.12%	24,055	16.15%	14,452	9.70%	195	0.13%	38,384	25.77%	148,958
Columbia	431	26.46%	624	38.31%	434	26.64%	137	8.41%	3	0.18%	-190	-11.66%	1,629
Cowlitz	13,752	38.61%	11,361	31.90%	7,897	22.17%	2,564	7.20%	46	0.13%	2,391	6.71%	35,620
Douglas	4,095	31.01%	5,241	39.68%	2,811	21.28%	1,036	7.84%	24	0.18%	-1,146	-8.68%	13,207
Ferry	1,001	32.32%	878	28.35%	984	31.77%	231	7.46%	3	0.10%	17	0.55%	3,097
Franklin	6,056	33.43%	6,761	37.33%	3,642	20.11%	1,635	9.03%	19	0.10%	-705	-3.89%	18,113
Garfield	228	23.92%	284	29.80%	328	34.42%	110	11.54%	3	0.31%	-44	-4.62%	953
Grant	5,563	25.65%	8,268	38.12%	6,152	28.36%	1,671	7.70%	35	0.16%	-2,116	-9.76%	21,689
Grays Harbor	10,713	44.83%	7,217	30.20%	4,263	17.84%	1,685	7.05%	20	0.08%	3,496	14.63%	23,898
Island	19,107	53.12%	9,959	27.69%	3,685	10.24%	3,168	8.81%	51	0.14%	9,148	25.43%	35,970
Jefferson	12,099	69.92%	2,708	15.65%	1,417	8.19%	1,039	6.00%	42	0.24%	9,391	54.27%	17,305
King	537,345	73.25%	102,075	13.91%	40,998	5.59%	52,550	7.16%	617	0.08%	435,270	59.33%	733,585
Kitsap	53,640	55.90%	23,567	24.56%	10,484	10.93%	8,188	8.53%	77	0.08%	30,073	31.34%	95,956
Kittitas	6,117	39.22%	5,016	32.16%	3,228	20.70%	1,226	7.86%	10	0.06%	1,101	7.06%	15,597
Klickitat	3,469	42.52%	2,333	28.60%	1,848	22.65%	504	6.18%	4	0.05%	1,136	13.92%	8,158
Lewis	8,585	28.97%	11,771	39.73%	6,195	20.91%	3,050	10.29%	30	0.10%	-3,186	-10.75%	29,631
Lincoln	1,006	21.65%	1,779	38.28%	1,406	30.26%	453	9.75%	3	0.06%	-373	-8.03%	4,647
Mason	10,483	44.44%	7,510	31.84%	3,606	15.29%	1,963	8.32%	27	0.11%	2,973	12.60%	23,589
Okanogan	5,211	38.87%	3,394	25.32%	3,589	26.77%	1,194	8.91%	19	0.14%	1,622	12.10%	13,407
Pacific	4,384	48.09%	2,586	28.37%	1,611	17.67%	517	5.67%	18	0.20%	1,798	19.72%	9,116
Pend Oreille	1,651	31.81%	1,665	32.08%	1,476	28.44%	392	7.55%	6	0.12%	-14	-0.27%	5,190
Pierce	135,072	50.46%	71,527	26.72%	32,198	12.03%	28,644	10.70%	240	0.09%	63,545	23.74%	267,681
San Juan	6,733	75.14%	1,508	16.83%	413	4.61%	299	3.34%	8	0.09%	5,225	58.31%	8,961
Skagit	22,640	49.30%	13,502	29.40%	5,977	13.02%	3,756	8.18%	47	0.10%	9,138	19.90%	45,922
Skamania	1,770	42.88%	1,122	27.18%	958	23.21%	276	6.69%	2	0.05%	648	15.70%	4,128
Snohomish	139,015	54.39%	66,296	25.94%	26,626	10.42%	23,452	9.18%	185	0.07%	72,719	28.45%	255,574
Spokane	72,690	44.62%	44,699	27.44%	32,990	20.25%	12,316	7.56%	202	0.12%	27,991	17.18%	162,897
Stevens	4,594	25.41%	6,514	36.03%	5,603	30.99%	1,335	7.38%	34	0.19%	-911	-5.04%	18,080
Thurston	58,993	56.39%	23,901	22.84%	12,311	11.77%	9,283	8.87%	135	0.13%	35,092	33.54%	104,623
Wahkiakum	786	40.60%	589	30.42%	441	22.78%	118	6.10%	2	0.10%	197	10.18%	1,936
Walla Walla	8,086	42.26%	5,374	28.09%	4,167	21.78%	1,491	7.79%	14	0.07%	2,712	14.18%	19,132
Whatcom	52,115	57.58%	26,701	29.50%	6,759	7.47%	4,867	5.38%	60	0.07%	25,414	28.08%	90,502
Whitman	5,324	48.18%	2,713	24.55%	2,106	19.06%	895	8.10%	12	0.11%	2,611	23.63%	11,050
Yakima	18,567	36.47%	16,196	31.81%	11,725	23.03%	4,376	8.60%	46	0.09%	2,371	4.66%	50,910
Totals	1,356,225	55.79%	575,470	23.67%	296,843	12.21%	199,826	8.22%	2,372	0.10%	780,755	32.12%	2,430,736

Counties that flipped from Democratic to Republican

- Cowlitz (largest city: Longview)
- Grays Harbor (largest city: Anderdeen)
- Mason (largest city: Shelton)
- Pacific (largest city: Raymond)
- Wahkiakum (largest city: Puget Island)

Counties that flipped from Republican to Democratic

- Clallam (largest city: Port Angeles)
- Island (largest city: Oak Harbor)
- Pierce (largest city: Tacoma)

==== By congressional district ====
District	Ferguson	Larkin	Rogers	Vaska	Representative
1st	54%	27%	10%	9%	Suzan DelBene
2nd	59%	24%	9%	8%	Rick Larsen
3rd	45%	28%	18%	9%	Jaime Herrera Beutler
4th	33%	35%	23%	8%	Dan Newhouse
5th	42%	28%	22%	8%	Cathy McMorris Rodgers
6th	56%	24%	11%	8%	Derek Kilmer
7th	84%	8%	3%	5%	Pramila Jayapal
8th	47%	29%	14%	11%	Kim Schrier
9th	71%	15%	6%	8%	Adam Smith
10th	53%	25%	12%	10%	Denny Heck

== General election ==
=== Predictions ===
Source	Ranking	As of
The Cook Political Report	Safe D	June 25, 2020

=== Post-primary endorsements ===
Bob Ferguson (D)

Newspapers

- The Seattle Times

=== Polling ===
Poll source	Date(s) administered	Sample size	Margin of error	Bob Ferguson (D)	Matt Larkin (R)	Undecided
Public Policy Polling (D) (Note: Poll sponsored by the Northwest Progressive Institute)	October 14–15, 2020	610 (LV)	± 4%	53%	39%	8%
SurveyUSA	October 8–10, 2020	591 (LV)	± 5.2%	49%	38%	13%

=== Results ===
2020 Washington Attorney General election
Party	Candidate	Votes	%	±%
Democratic	Bob Ferguson (incumbent)	2,226,418	56.43%	+2.95%
Republican	Matt Larkin	1,714,927	43.47%	–3.05%
Write-in		3,968	0.10%	N/A
Total votes		3,945,313	100.00%	N/A
Democratic hold				

==== By county ====
County results
County	Bob Ferguson Democratic		Matt Larkin Republican		Write-in Various		Margin		Total votes
County	#	%	#	%	#	%	#	%	Total votes
Adams	1,772	31.34%	3,876	68.54%	7	0.12%	-2,104	-37.21%	5,655
Asotin	4,182	36.52%	7,255	63.35%	15	0.13%	-3,073	-26.83%	11,452
Benton	37,124	37.32%	62,257	62.58%	107	0.11%	-25,133	-25.26%	99,488
Chelan	17,943	42.90%	23,839	56.99%	48	0.11%	-5,896	-14.10%	41,830
Clallam	23,696	49.66%	23,979	50.25%	41	0.09%	-283	-0.59%	47,716
Clark	132,248	50.53%	129,184	49.36%	290	0.11%	3,064	1.17%	261,722
Columbia	656	27.37%	1,740	72.59%	1	0.04%	-1,084	-45.22%	2,397
Cowlitz	23,346	40.32%	34,505	59.60%	44	0.08%	-11,159	-19.27%	57,895
Douglas	7,386	35.85%	13,193	64.03%	25	0.12%	-5,807	-28.18%	20,604
Ferry	1,440	34.26%	2,751	65.45%	12	0.29%	-1,311	-31.19%	4,203
Franklin	12,964	40.97%	18,650	58.94%	30	0.09%	-5,686	-17.97%	31,644
Garfield	369	26.19%	1,039	73.74%	1	0.07%	-670	-47.55%	1,409
Grant	11,463	31.50%	24,885	68.37%	48	0.13%	-13,422	-36.88%	36,396
Grays Harbor	16,983	45.57%	20,238	54.31%	46	0.12%	-3,255	-8.73%	37,267
Island	27,139	51.95%	25,053	47.96%	44	0.08%	2,086	3.99%	52,236
Jefferson	16,561	68.34%	7,658	31.60%	14	0.06%	8,903	36.74%	24,233
King	844,858	72.37%	321,559	27.55%	930	0.08%	523,299	44.83%	1,167,347
Kitsap	85,262	55.50%	68,176	44.38%	177	0.12%	17,086	11.12%	153,615
Kittitas	10,689	42.03%	14,719	57.88%	24	0.09%	-4,030	-15.85%	25,432
Klickitat	5,750	43.95%	7,312	55.89%	21	0.16%	-1,562	-11.94%	13,083
Lewis	14,022	31.80%	30,010	68.05%	65	0.15%	-15,988	-36.26%	44,097
Lincoln	1,654	24.15%	5,188	75.76%	6	0.09%	-3,534	-51.61%	6,848
Mason	16,402	45.34%	19,721	54.51%	55	0.15%	-3,319	-9.17%	36,178
Okanogan	8,625	41.91%	11,919	57.92%	34	0.17%	-3,294	-16.01%	20,578
Pacific	6,570	48.17%	7,042	51.63%	27	0.20%	-472	-3.46%	13,639
Pend Oreille	2,659	32.18%	5,593	67.68%	12	0.15%	-2,934	-35.50%	8,264
Pierce	233,651	52.05%	214,768	47.84%	502	0.11%	18,883	4.21%	448,921
San Juan	9,276	72.60%	3,492	27.33%	8	0.06%	5,784	45.27%	12,776
Skagit	35,159	50.05%	35,006	49.83%	88	0.13%	153	0.22%	70,253
Skamania	3,112	44.10%	3,929	55.68%	15	0.21%	-817	-11.58%	7,056
Snohomish	236,332	55.53%	188,921	44.39%	375	0.09%	47,411	11.14%	425,628
Spokane	131,171	46.20%	152,388	53.67%	378	0.13%	-21,217	-7.47%	283,937
Stevens	7,642	27.70%	19,902	72.15%	41	0.15%	-12,260	-44.44%	27,585
Thurston	91,643	56.25%	71,053	43.61%	217	0.13%	20,590	12.64%	162,913
Wahkiakum	1,124	39.52%	1,717	60.37%	3	0.11%	-593	-20.85%	2,844
Walla Walla	13,270	43.79%	17,005	56.12%	28	0.09%	-3,735	-12.33%	30,303
Whatcom	79,975	59.42%	54,518	40.51%	89	0.07%	25,457	18.92%	134,582
Whitman	10,703	52.63%	9,613	47.27%	21	0.10%	1,090	5.36%	20,337
Yakima	41,597	44.75%	51,274	55.16%	79	0.08%	-9,677	-10.41%	92,950
Totals	2,226,418	56.43%	1,714,927	43.47%	3,968	0.10%	511,491	12.96%	3,945,313

Counties that flipped from Democratic to Republican

- Cowlitz (largest city: Longview)
- Grays Harbor (largest city: Anderdeen)
- Mason (largest city: Shelton)
- Pacific (largest city: Raymond)

Counties that flipped from Republican to Democratic

- Clark (largest city: Vancouver)
- Island (largest city: Oak Harbor)
- Whitman (largest city: Pullman)

==== By congressional district ====
Ferguson won six of ten congressional districts, with the remaining four going to Larkin, including one that elected a Democrat.

District	Ferguson	Larkin	Representative
1st	55%	45%	Suzan DelBene
2nd	60%	40%	Rick Larsen
3rd	46%	54%	Jaime Herrera Beutler
4th	39%	61%	Dan Newhouse
5th	44%	56%	Cathy McMorris Rodgers
6th	56%	44%	Derek Kilmer
7th	83%	17%	Pramila Jayapal
8th	49%	51%	Kim Schrier
9th	71%	29%	Adam Smith
10th	54%	45%	Denny Heck (116th Congress)
10th	54%	45%	Marilyn Strickland (117th Congress)

== Notes ==
Partisan clients
