= List of current United States first spouses =

In the United States, the first spouse is the term used to refer to the spouse of a chief executive—that is, of the spouse of the president of the United States (the first lady of the United States and the first gentleman of the United States) and the spouses of the governors of the 50 U.S. states and U.S. territories (Guam, Northern Mariana Islands, Puerto Rico, American Samoa, and the United States Virgin Islands) and the spouse of the mayor of the District of Columbia. (The spouses of many mayors are often called the "first lady" or "first gentleman" of the city as well, and the use of the terms sometimes extends even to the spouses of college presidents).

Since 1985, the National Governors Association has encouraged state first ladies and gentlemen to pursue their own, distinct causes and public agendas. The public role of the first spouse is traditionally ceremonial. Like the first ladies of the United States, state and territorial first spouses are not elected and earn no government salary. However, traditionally first spouses also champion important causes either nationally or within their individual states or territories, such as charitable and humanitarian work. First spouses are often seen as high-profile individuals who can direct public awareness towards a particular cause or campaign. For example, the nation's first spouses launched a nationwide national breast cancer awareness campaign in conjunction with the National Governors Association in 1994. In collaboration with the breast cancer initiative, some first spouses participated in media campaigns, public relations, chaired statewide breast cancer awareness committees, and even spearheaded the creation of a specific women's departments within state health departments. Diverse initiatives championed by individual current first spouses have included advocacy against drunk driving, heart disease in women, the Special Olympics, and development assistance projects in Rwanda.

Most first spouses have pursued their own careers before entering the public arena when their husbands or wives assumed the governor's mansion. For example, Lou Rell, former first gentleman of Connecticut, is a former naval pilot and commercial airline pilot with TWA.

Three states, Alabama, Maine and Massachusetts along with the District of Columbia and Puerto Rico, do not have a first lady or first gentleman.

== Current first spouses ==
=== United States ===
Current first lady	President	Past	First spouse since
Melania Trump	Donald Trump	List	January 20, 2025

Current second lady	Vice President	Past	Second spouse since
Usha Vance	JD Vance	List	January 20, 2025

=== States ===
State	Current first lady or first gentleman	Governor	Past	First spouse since
Alabama	Divorced	Kay Ivey	List	
Alaska	Rose Dunleavy	Mike Dunleavy	List	December 3, 2018
Arizona	Patrick Goodman	Katie Hobbs	List	January 2, 2023
Arkansas	Bryan Sanders	Sarah Huckabee Sanders	List	January 10, 2023
California	Jennifer Siebel Newsom (Note: Jennifer Siebel Newsom will be California’s ‘first partner.’ Her agenda is cultural change. The Los Angeles Times. November 24, 2018. "Now she’ll take on her newest political role: 'first partner,' a term she prefers over 'first lady' — she sees it as more inclusive.")	Gavin Newsom	List	January 7, 2019
Colorado	Marlon Reis (Note: How should we refer to Governor-elect Jared Polis’ longtime partner? The Denver Post. November 8, 2018. Reis and Polis were not legally married when Polis assumed office in January 2019, but Polis' campaign confirmed that Reis would use the title of first gentleman. Reis and Polis married in September 2021, making Reis the de jure first gentleman.)	Jared Polis	List	January 8, 2019 (Note: Reis and Polis were not legally married when Polis assumed office and was the de facto first gentleman. The couple married on September 15, 2021, and Reis became the de jure first gentleman.)
Connecticut	Ann Lamont	Ned Lamont	List	January 9, 2019
Delaware	Lauren Meyer	Matt Meyer	List	January 21, 2025
Florida	Casey DeSantis	Ron DeSantis	List	January 8, 2019
Georgia	Marty Kemp	Brian Kemp	List	January 14, 2019
Hawaii	Jaime Green	Josh Green	List	December 5, 2022
Idaho	Teresa Little	Brad Little	List	January 7, 2019
Illinois	MK Pritzker	J. B. Pritzker	List	January 14, 2019
Indiana	Maureen Braun	Mike Braun	List	January 13, 2025
Iowa	Kevin Reynolds	Kim Reynolds	List	May 24, 2017
Kansas	Divorced	Laura Kelly	List	
Kentucky	Britainy Beshear	Andy Beshear	List	December 10, 2019
Louisiana	Sharon Landry	Jeff Landry	List	January 8, 2024
Maine	Widowed	Janet Mills	List	
Maryland	Dawn Moore	Wes Moore	List	January 18, 2023
Massachusetts	Joanna Lydgate	Maura Healey	List	January 9, 2023
Michigan	Marc Mallory	Gretchen Whitmer	List	January 1, 2019
Minnesota	Gwen Walz	Tim Walz	List	January 7, 2019
Mississippi	Elee Reeves	Tate Reeves	List	January 14, 2020
Missouri	Claudia Kehoe	Mike Kehoe	List	January 13, 2025
Montana	Susan Gianforte	Greg Gianforte	List	January 4, 2021
Nebraska	Suzanne Pillen	Jim Pillen	List	January 5, 2023
Nevada	Donna Lombardo	Joe Lombardo	List	January 2, 2023
New Hampshire	Joseph Daley	Kelly Ayotte	List	January 8, 2025
New Jersey	Jason Hedberg	Mikie Sherrill	List	January 20, 2026
New Mexico	Manuel Cordova	Michelle Lujan Grisham	List	May 21, 2022
New York	William J. Hochul Jr.	Kathy Hochul	List	August 24, 2021
North Carolina	Anna Harris Stein	Josh Stein	List	January 1, 2025
North Dakota	Kjersti Armstrong	Kelly Armstrong	List	December 15, 2024
Ohio	Fran DeWine	Mike DeWine	List	January 14, 2019
Oklahoma	Sarah Hazen Stitt	Kevin Stitt	List	January 14, 2019
Oregon	Aimee Kotek Wilson	Tina Kotek	List	January 9, 2023
Pennsylvania	Lori Shapiro	Josh Shapiro	List	January 17, 2023
Rhode Island	Susan McKee	Dan McKee	List	March 2, 2021
South Carolina	Peggy McMaster	Henry McMaster	List	January 24, 2017
South Dakota	Sandy Rhoden	Larry Rhoden	List	January 25, 2025
Tennessee	Maria Lee	Bill Lee	List	January 19, 2019
Texas	Cecilia Phalen Abbott	Greg Abbott	List	January 20, 2015
Utah	Abby Cox	Spencer Cox	List	January 4, 2021
Vermont	Diana McTeague Scott	Phil Scott	List	January 5, 2017
Virginia	Adam Spanberger	Abigail Spanberger	List	January 17, 2026
Washington	Colleen Ferguson	Bob Ferguson	List	January 15, 2025
West Virginia	Denise Morrisey	Patrick Morrisey	List	January 13, 2025
Wisconsin	Kathy Evers	Tony Evers	List	January 7, 2019
Wyoming	Jennie Gordon	Mark Gordon	List	January 7, 2019

=== Territories and federal district ===
Territory	Current first lady or first gentleman	Governor	Past	First spouse since
American Samoa	Lois Pula	Pula Nikolao Pula	List	January 3, 2025
District of Columbia	Never married	Muriel Bowser (mayor)	List	
Guam	Jeffrey A. Cook	Lou Leon Guerrero	List	January 7, 2019
Northern Mariana Islands	Widowed	David Apatang	List	
Puerto Rico	José Yovin Vargas	Jenniffer González-Colón	List	January 2, 2025
U.S. Virgin Islands	Divorced	Albert Bryan Jr.	List	

== See also ==
- List of current United States governors
- List of current United States lieutenant governors
- List of first gentlemen in the United States
