= 2024 Washington Attorney General election =

- November 5, 2024
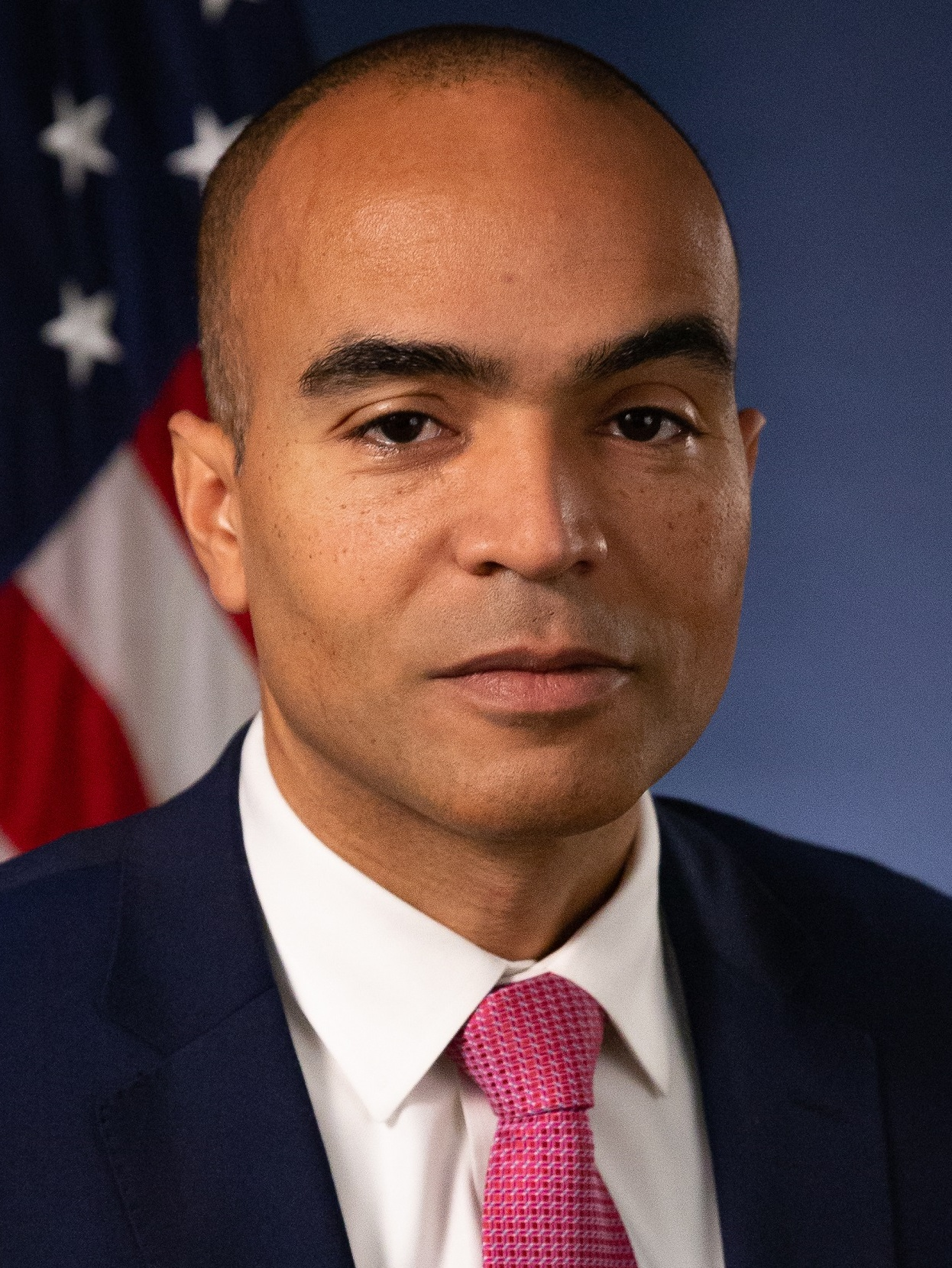

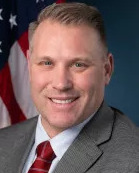
Nominee	Nick Brown	Pete Serrano
Party	Democratic	Republican
Popular vote	2,093,570	1,669,884
Percentage	55.58%	44.33%
- Brown: 40–50% 50–60% 60–70% 70–80% 80–90% >90% Serrano: 40–50% 50–60% 60–70% 70–80% 80–90% >90% Tie: 40–50% 50% No votes
Attorney General before election
Bob Ferguson
Democratic
Elected Attorney General
Nick Brown
Democratic

The 2024 Washington attorney general election was held on November 5, 2024, to elect the next attorney general of Washington, concurrently with the 2024 U.S. presidential election, as well as elections to the U.S. Senate and various state and local elections, including for U.S. House and governor of Washington. Incumbent Democratic attorney general Bob Ferguson was eligible to seek re-election to a fourth term but had chosen instead to run successfully for governor. U.S. attorney Nick Brown, a Democrat, won the election against Pasco mayor Pete Serrano, a Republican.

== Background ==
This the first open attorney general race since 2012, when Bob Ferguson first ran for the office. The primary election was expected to split the Democratic vote as Democrats Nick Brown and Manka Dhingra were on the primary ballot. Both Brown and Dhingra campaigned on similar issues like protecting access to abortion in the state, upholding gun control laws and ensuring public safety. Once Brown advanced to the general election, he advocated for similar measures along with "policy improvements" the Attorney General position can utilize to counter various issues like illicit drugs. Republican Pete Serrano campaigned on stopping human trafficking, making communities safer, and government accountability. Serrano opposed gun control and had previously expressed personal opposition to abortion, but said he would uphold Washington's current abortion laws if elected, describing abortion as a "settled issue." However, Serrano indicated he would not enforce the Washington Shield Law enacted in 2023, which protects Washington residents from criminal and civil actions in other states that restrict abortion.

== Candidates ==
Washington is one of two states that holds a top-two primary, meaning that all candidates are listed on the same ballot regardless of party affiliation, and the top two move on to the general election.

=== Democratic Party ===
==== Advanced to general ====
- Nick Brown, lawyer and former U.S. attorney for the Western District of Washington (2021–2023)

==== Eliminated in primary ====
- Manka Dhingra, state senator (2017–present)

==== Declined ====
- Bob Ferguson, incumbent attorney general (2013–2025) (ran for governor)
- Noah Purcell, solicitor general (2013–present) (endorsed Brown)

=== Republican Party ===
==== Advanced to general ====
- Pete Serrano, mayor of Pasco (2022–present) and director of conservative legal nonprofit

== Primary election ==
=== Endorsements ===
Nick Brown (D)

Statewide officials

- Jay Inslee, incumbent governor of Washington
- Noah Purcell, Washington Solicitor General

Newspapers

- The Seattle Times
- The Stranger
Manka Dhingra (D)

Organizations

- EMILY's List
- National Women's Political Caucus of Washington
Pete Serrano (R)

Political parties

- Washington State Republican Party

=== Polling ===
Poll source	Date(s) administered	Sample size (Note: Key: A – all adults RV – registered voters LV – likely voters V – unclear)	Margin of error	Nick Brown (D)	Manka Dhingra (D)	Pete Serrano (R)	Undecided
Public Policy Polling (D) (Note: Poll conducted for The Cascadia Advocate)	July 24–25, 2024	581 (LV)	± 4.0%	17%	15%	38%	30%
Public Policy Polling (D)	May 15–16, 2024	615 (LV)	± 4.0%	9%	10%	36%	45%
Public Policy Polling (D)	February 13–14, 2024	789 (LV)	± 3.5%	19%	12%	35%	34%

=== Debate ===
2024 Washington Attorney General primary debate
No.	Date	Host	Moderator	Link	Democratic	Democratic	Republican
Key: P Participant A Absent N Not invited I Invited W Withdrawn							
Key: P Participant A Absent N Not invited I Invited W Withdrawn					Nick Brown	Manka Dhingra	Pete Serrano
1	Jun. 18, 2024	League of Women Voters of Washington & Benton-Franklin Counties; Northwest Public Broadcasting	Matt Loveless		P	P	P

=== Results ===
County results Serrano: 30–40%; 40–50%; 50–60%; 60–70%; 70–80%; 80–90%; Brown: 30–40%; 40–50%

Congressional district results Serrano: 30–40%; 40–50%; 50–60%; 60–70%; Brown: 40–50%; 60–70%

Blanket primary election results
Party	Candidate	Votes	%
Republican	Pete Serrano	814,372	42.11%
Democratic	Nick Brown	682,360	35.28%
Democratic	Manka Dhingra	435,919	22.54%
Write-in		1,284	0.07%
Total votes		1,933,935	100.00%

==== By county ====
Combined partisan vote by county Democratic: 50–60%; 60–70%; 70–80%; Republican: 50–60%; 60–70%; 70–80%; 80–90%

Combined partisan vote by congressional district Democratic: 50–60%; 60–70%; 70–80%; 80–90%; Republican: 50–60%; 60–70%

County results
County	Nick Brown Democratic		Pete Serrano Republican		Manka Dhingra Democratic		Write-in Various		Margin		Total votes
County	#	%	#	%	#	%	#	%	#	%	Total votes
Adams	357	14.67%	1,889	77.61%	182	7.48%	6	0.25%	1,532	62.94%	2,434
Asotin	1,250	22.16%	3,591	63.66%	795	14.09%	5	0.09%	2,341	41.50%	5,641
Benton	10,513	21.15%	32,410	65.22%	6,735	13.55%	38	0.08%	21,897	44.06%	49,696
Chelan	5,462	25.05%	12,844	58.90%	3,490	16.01%	9	0.04%	7,382	33.85%	21,805
Clallam	9,094	31.78%	12,653	44.22%	6,852	23.95%	14	0.05%	3,559	12.44%	28,613
Clark	36,794	27.72%	64,015	48.22%	31,857	24.00%	92	0.07%	27,221	20.50%	132,758
Columbia	222	17.52%	945	74.59%	98	7.73%	2	0.16%	723	57.06%	1,267
Cowlitz	7,810	27.24%	17,248	60.16%	3,584	12.50%	26	0.09%	9,438	32.92%	28,668
Douglas	2,254	20.65%	7,462	68.37%	1,185	10.86%	13	0.12%	5,208	47.72%	10,914
Ferry	475	20.25%	1,645	70.12%	224	9.55%	2	0.09%	1,170	49.87%	2,346
Franklin	2,671	19.03%	9,624	68.55%	1,736	12.37%	8	0.06%	6,953	49.53%	14,039
Garfield	115	15.69%	590	80.49%	28	3.82%	0	0.00%	475	64.80%	733
Grant	3,087	18.65%	12,328	74.46%	1,130	6.83%	11	0.07%	9,241	55.82%	16,556
Grays Harbor	5,935	30.74%	10,126	52.46%	3,231	16.74%	12	0.06%	4,191	21.71%	19,304
Island	11,427	38.13%	12,881	42.98%	5,634	18.80%	27	0.09%	1,454	4.85%	29,969
Jefferson	6,713	43.00%	3,971	25.43%	4,923	31.53%	6	0.04%	-1,790	-11.46%	15,613
King	263,306	48.33%	132,349	24.29%	148,923	27.33%	286	0.05%	-114,383	-20.99%	544,864
Kitsap	32,963	39.65%	32,958	39.64%	17,163	20.64%	54	0.06%	-5	-0.01%	83,138
Kittitas	3,048	25.91%	7,240	61.55%	1,469	12.49%	5	0.04%	4,192	35.64%	11,762
Klickitat	2,029	27.26%	4,292	57.66%	1,118	15.02%	5	0.07%	2,263	30.40%	7,444
Lewis	4,474	18.87%	16,460	69.43%	2,735	11.54%	37	0.16%	11,986	50.56%	23,706
Lincoln	527	13.38%	3,104	78.82%	307	7.80%	0	0.00%	2,577	65.44%	3,938
Mason	6,001	31.12%	10,092	52.33%	3,175	16.46%	17	0.09%	4,091	21.21%	19,285
Okanogan	2,876	24.48%	7,061	60.11%	1,799	15.32%	10	0.09%	4,185	35.63%	11,746
Pacific	2,464	30.73%	4,117	51.35%	1,426	17.78%	11	0.14%	1,653	20.62%	8,018
Pend Oreille	954	21.48%	3,058	68.84%	423	9.52%	7	0.16%	2,104	47.37%	4,442
Pierce	63,983	30.72%	96,225	46.20%	47,962	23.03%	117	0.06%	32,242	15.48%	208,287
San Juan	3,073	39.73%	1,877	24.27%	2,780	35.95%	4	0.05%	-293	-3.79%	7,734
Skagit	12,397	34.07%	16,494	45.33%	7,485	20.57%	11	0.03%	4,097	11.26%	36,387
Skamania	938	23.56%	2,247	56.44%	790	19.84%	6	0.15%	1,309	32.88%	3,981
Snohomish	69,532	35.02%	82,351	41.48%	46,527	23.43%	136	0.07%	12,819	6.46%	198,546
Spokane	37,954	26.87%	75,872	53.72%	27,283	19.32%	131	0.09%	37,918	26.85%	141,240
Stevens	2,567	16.47%	11,482	73.68%	1,517	9.73%	17	0.11%	8,915	57.21%	15,583
Thurston	30,813	35.97%	33,580	39.20%	21,221	24.77%	59	0.07%	2,767	3.23%	85,673
Wahkiakum	496	28.64%	1,005	58.03%	230	13.28%	1	0.06%	509	29.39%	1,732
Walla Walla	3,877	26.82%	8,277	57.26%	2,299	15.90%	2	0.01%	4,400	30.44%	14,455
Whatcom	21,895	31.11%	28,216	40.09%	20,231	28.75%	35	0.05%	6,321	8.98%	70,377
Whitman	2,638	28.96%	4,872	53.49%	1,591	17.47%	8	0.09%	2,234	24.53%	9,109
Yakima	9,376	22.25%	26,921	63.90%	5,781	13.72%	54	0.13%	17,545	41.64%	42,132
Totals	682,360	35.28%	814,372	42.11%	435,919	22.54%	1,284	0.07%	132,012	6.83%	1,933,935

Counties that flipped from Republican to Democratic

- Clark (largest city: Vancouver)
- Skagit (largest city: Mount Vernon)

==== By congressional district ====
District	Brown	Serrano	Dhingra	Representative
1st	36%	37%	27%	Suzan DelBene
2nd	35%	39%	25%	Rick Larsen
3rd	26%	53%	20%	Marie Gluesenkamp Perez
4th	22%	65%	13%	Dan Newhouse
5th	25%	57%	17%	Cathy McMorris Rodgers
6th	36%	40%	23%	Derek Kilmer
7th	61%	13%	26%	Pramila Jayapal
8th	29%	49%	22%	Kim Schrier
9th	45%	28%	27%	Adam Smith
10th	34%	41%	24%	Marilyn Strickland

== General election ==
=== Predictions ===
Source	Ranking	As of
Sabato's Crystal Ball	Safe D	July 25, 2024

=== Polling ===
Poll source	Date(s) administered	Sample size (Note: Key: A – all adults RV – registered voters LV – likely voters V – unclear)	Margin of error	Nick Brown (D)	Pete Serrano (R)	Undecided
ActiVote	October 3–29, 2024	400 (LV)	± 4.9%	57%	43%	–
Public Policy Polling (D)	October 16–17, 2024	571 (LV)	± 4.1%	46%	39%	15%
Strategies 360	October 11–16, 2024	600 (RV)	± 4.0%	48%	38%	13%
Cascade PBS/Elway Research	October 8–12, 2024	401 (LV)	± 5.0%	47%	29%	24%

=== Debates ===
2024 Washington Attorney General debates
No.	Date	Host	Moderator	Link	Democratic	Republican
Key: P Participant A Absent N Not invited I Invited W Withdrawn						
Key: P Participant A Absent N Not invited I Invited W Withdrawn					Nick Brown	Pete Serrano
1	Sep. 18, 2024	Association of Washington Business	Paul Reed	TVW	P	P
2	Sep. 19, 2024	Seattle CityClub; Washington State Debate Coalition		YouTube	P	P

=== Results ===
2024 Washington Attorney General election
Party	Candidate	Votes	%	±%
Democratic	Nick Brown	2,093,570	55.58%	–0.85%
Republican	Pete Serrano	1,669,884	44.33%	+0.86%
Write-in		3,616	0.10%	–
Total votes		3,767,070	100.00%	N/A
Democratic hold				

==== By county ====
County	Nick Brown Democratic		Pete Serrano Republican		Write-in Various		Margin		Total
County	#	%	#	%	#	%	#	%	Total
Adams	1,280	24.93%	3,842	74.82%	13	0.25%	-2,562	-49.89%	5,135
Asotin	3,764	34.23%	7,218	65.64%	14	0.13%	-3,454	-31.41%	10,996
Benton	34,262	35.28%	62,767	64.64%	75	0.08%	-28,505	-29.36%	97,104
Chelan	16,706	41.45%	23,573	58.48%	28	0.07%	-6,867	-17.04%	40,307
Clallam	24,149	51.41%	22,769	48.47%	53	0.11%	1,380	2.94%	46,971
Clark	132,837	50.53%	129,719	49.34%	340	0.13%	3,118	1.19%	262,896
Columbia	590	24.85%	1,780	74.98%	4	0.17%	-1,190	-50.13%	2,374
Cowlitz	21,727	38.03%	35,347	61.87%	54	0.09%	-13,620	-23.84%	57,128
Douglas	6,853	33.59%	13,533	66.33%	17	0.08%	-6,680	-32.74%	20,403
Ferry	1,211	30.34%	2,778	69.61%	2	0.05%	-1,567	-39.26%	3,991
Franklin	11,009	35.58%	19,917	64.36%	18	0.06%	-8,908	-28.79%	30,944
Garfield	283	21.64%	1,025	78.36%	0	0.00%	-742	-56.73%	1,308
Grant	9,749	27.96%	25,095	71.97%	25	0.07%	-15,346	-44.01%	34,869
Grays Harbor	16,445	45.25%	19,866	54.66%	35	0.10%	-3,421	-9.41%	36,346
Island	27,675	54.60%	22,951	45.28%	58	0.11%	4,724	9.32%	50,684
Jefferson	16,884	69.99%	7,224	29.95%	14	0.06%	9,660	40.05%	24,122
King	776,835	71.71%	305,553	28.20%	977	0.09%	471,282	43.50%	1,083,365
Kitsap	85,807	56.75%	65,259	43.16%	147	0.10%	20,548	13.59%	151,213
Kittitas	9,826	38.74%	15,516	61.17%	22	0.09%	-5,690	-22.43%	25,364
Klickitat	5,529	42.42%	7,495	57.50%	10	0.08%	-1,966	-15.08%	13,034
Lewis	13,764	31.46%	29,963	68.48%	27	0.06%	-16,199	-37.02%	43,754
Lincoln	1,482	21.40%	5,437	78.51%	6	0.09%	-3,955	-57.11%	6,925
Mason	16,210	45.79%	19,139	54.06%	53	0.15%	-2,929	-8.27%	35,402
Okanogan	7,975	39.83%	12,034	60.09%	16	0.08%	-4,059	-20.27%	20,025
Pacific	6,553	47.77%	7,153	52.14%	13	0.09%	-600	-4.37%	13,719
Pend Oreille	2,321	27.98%	5,962	71.87%	12	0.14%	-3,641	-43.89%	8,295
Pierce	220,617	52.08%	202,628	47.83%	360	0.08%	17,989	4.25%	423,605
San Juan	9,028	72.75%	3,367	27.13%	14	0.11%	5,661	45.62%	12,409
Skagit	34,283	51.04%	32,838	48.89%	47	0.07%	1,445	2.15%	67,168
Skamania	2,963	42.17%	4,060	57.79%	3	0.04%	-1,097	-15.61%	7,026
Snohomish	220,566	55.49%	176,616	44.43%	327	0.08%	43,950	11.06%	397,509
Spokane	120,802	43.73%	155,092	56.15%	326	0.12%	-34,290	-12.41%	276,220
Stevens	6,971	25.31%	20,549	74.60%	26	0.09%	-13,578	-49.29%	27,546
Thurston	90,343	56.86%	68,388	43.05%	142	0.09%	21,955	13.82%	158,873
Wahkiakum	1,156	39.59%	1,762	60.34%	2	0.07%	-606	-20.75%	2,920
Walla Walla	12,089	42.13%	16,597	57.84%	11	0.04%	-4,508	-15.71%	28,697
Whatcom	79,277	59.65%	53,531	40.28%	96	0.07%	25,746	19.37%	132,904
Whitman	9,672	50.13%	9,603	49.77%	20	0.10%	69	0.36%	19,295
Yakima	34,077	39.52%	51,938	60.24%	209	0.24%	-17,861	-20.71%	86,224
Totals	2,093,570	55.58%	1,669,884	44.33%	3,616	0.10%	423,686	11.25%	3,767,070

Counties that flipped from Republican to Democratic

- Clallam (largest city: Port Angeles)

==== By congressional district ====
Brown won six of ten congressional districts, with the remaining four going to Serrano, including two that elected Democrats.

District	Brown	Serrano	Representative
1st	60%	40%	Suzan DelBene
2nd	58%	42%	Rick Larsen
3rd	46%	54%	Marie Gluesenkamp Perez
4th	36%	64%	Dan Newhouse
5th	41%	59%	Cathy McMorris Rodgers (118th Congress)
5th	41%	59%	Michael Baumgartner (119th Congress)
6th	56%	44%	Derek Kilmer (118th Congress)
6th	56%	44%	Emily Randall (119th Congress)
7th	84%	16%	Pramila Jayapal
8th	48%	51%	Kim Schrier
9th	67%	33%	Adam Smith
10th	56%	44%	Marilyn Strickland

== Notes ==
Partisan clients
