= 2016 Washington Attorney General election =

- November 8, 2016
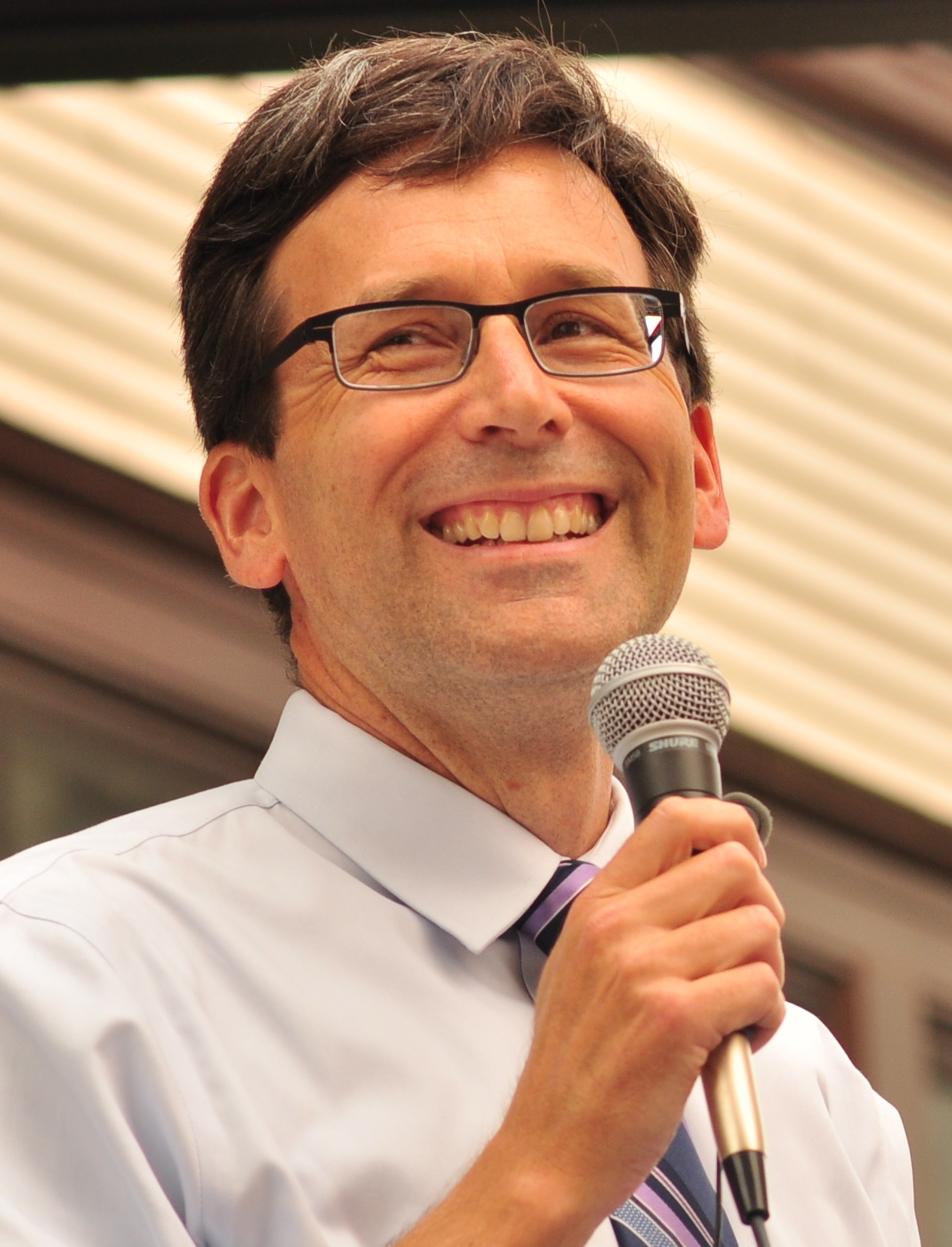

Nominee	Bob Ferguson	Joshua Trumbull
Party	Democratic	Libertarian
Popular vote	2,000,804	979,105
Percentage	67.14%	32.86%
- Ferguson: 50–60% 60–70% 70–80% 80–90% >90% Trumbull: 50–60% 60–70% 70–80% 80–90% >90% Tie: 50% No votes
Attorney General before election
Bob Ferguson
Democratic
Elected Attorney General
Bob Ferguson
Democratic

The 2016 Washington Attorney General election was held on November 8, 2016, to elect the attorney general of Washington, concurrently with the 2016 U.S. presidential election, as well as elections to the U.S. Senate and various state and local elections, including for U.S. House and governor of Washington. Incumbent Democratic Attorney General Bob Ferguson was re-elected to a second term in office, defeating Libertarian challenger Joshua Trumbull.

== Background ==
Ferguson was first elected in 2012 against Republican King County Councilor Reagan Dunn, winning 53% of the vote to succeed Republican Rob McKenna. He ran for re-election to a second term.

== Candidates ==
Washington is one of two states that holds a top-two primary, meaning that all candidates are listed on the same ballot regardless of party affiliation, and the top two move on to the general election.

=== Democratic Party ===
==== Advanced to general ====
- Bob Ferguson, incumbent attorney general (2013–2025)

=== Libertarian Party ===
==== Advanced to general ====
- Joshua Trumbull, attorney

== Primary election ==
=== Results ===
County results Ferguson: 50–60%; 60–70%; 70–80%; 80–90%

Congressional district results Ferguson: 50–60%; 60–70%; 70–80%; 80–90%

Blanket primary election results
Party	Candidate	Votes	%
Democratic	Bob Ferguson (incumbent)	906,493	72.61
Libertarian	Joshua Trumbull	341,932	27.39
Total votes		1,248,425	100.00

==== By county ====
County results
County	Bob Ferguson Democratic		Joshua Trumbull Libertarian		Margin		Total votes
County	#	%	#	%	#	%	Total votes
Adams	818	52.40%	743	47.60%	75	4.80%	1,561
Asotin	2,398	62.86%	1,417	37.14%	981	25.71%	3,815
Benton	17,037	59.02%	11,830	40.98%	5,207	18.04%	28,867
Chelan	7,711	62.71%	4,586	37.29%	3,125	25.41%	12,297
Clallam	10,806	66.09%	5,544	33.91%	5,262	32.18%	16,350
Clark	43,709	65.63%	22,894	34.37%	20,815	31.25%	66,603
Columbia	454	53.04%	402	46.96%	52	6.07%	856
Cowlitz	10,190	63.26%	5,918	36.74%	4,272	26.52%	16,108
Douglas	3,285	58.83%	2,299	41.17%	986	17.66%	5,584
Ferry	879	55.04%	718	44.96%	161	10.08%	1,597
Franklin	4,256	56.03%	3,340	43.97%	916	12.06%	7,596
Garfield	267	54.83%	220	45.17%	47	9.65%	487
Grant	4,719	50.92%	4,548	49.08%	171	1.85%	9,267
Grays Harbor	8,198	68.60%	3,752	31.40%	4,446	37.21%	11,950
Island	13,409	69.72%	5,824	30.28%	7,585	39.44%	19,233
Jefferson	7,625	77.78%	2,178	22.22%	5,447	55.56%	9,803
King	336,154	83.33%	67,270	16.67%	268,884	66.65%	403,424
Kitsap	35,808	72.15%	13,825	27.85%	21,983	44.29%	49,633
Kittitas	4,351	64.98%	2,345	35.02%	2,006	29.96%	6,696
Klickitat	2,249	58.71%	1,582	41.29%	667	17.41%	3,831
Lewis	7,101	56.24%	5,526	43.76%	1,575	12.47%	12,627
Lincoln	1,180	52.26%	1,078	47.74%	102	4.52%	2,258
Mason	8,212	66.48%	4,140	33.52%	4,072	32.97%	12,352
Okanogan	4,331	61.33%	2,731	38.67%	1,600	22.66%	7,062
Pacific	3,292	68.21%	1,534	31.79%	1,758	36.43%	4,826
Pend Oreille	1,607	54.94%	1,318	45.06%	289	9.88%	2,925
Pierce	94,945	71.35%	38,117	28.65%	56,828	42.71%	133,062
San Juan	3,877	76.32%	1,203	23.68%	2,674	52.64%	5,080
Skagit	15,183	69.66%	6,612	30.34%	8,571	39.33%	21,795
Skamania	1,139	58.98%	792	41.02%	347	17.97%	1,931
Snohomish	93,730	70.78%	38,689	29.22%	55,041	41.57%	132,419
Spokane	53,672	62.55%	32,135	37.45%	21,537	25.10%	85,807
Stevens	4,603	50.19%	4,568	49.81%	35	0.38%	9,171
Thurston	42,442	75.34%	13,893	24.66%	28,549	50.68%	56,335
Wahkiakum	574	60.29%	378	39.71%	196	20.59%	952
Walla Walla	6,034	61.23%	3,821	38.77%	2,213	22.46%	9,855
Whatcom	30,261	70.45%	12,691	29.55%	17,570	40.91%	42,952
Whitman	3,897	65.39%	2,063	34.61%	1,834	30.77%	5,960
Yakima	16,090	63.10%	9,408	36.90%	6,682	26.21%	25,498
Totals	906,493	72.61%	341,932	27.39%	564,561	45.22%	1,248,425

== General election ==
=== Predictions ===
Source	Ranking
Governing	Safe D

=== Endorsements ===
Bob Ferguson (D)

Newspapers

- The Seattle Times

=== Results ===
2016 Washington Attorney General election
Party	Candidate	Votes	%
Democratic	Bob Ferguson (incumbent)	2,000,804	67.14
Libertarian	Joshua Trumbull	979,105	32.86
Total votes		2,979,909	100.00
Democratic hold			

==== By county ====
County results
County	Bob Ferguson Democratic		Joshua Trumbull Libertarian		Margin		Total votes
County	#	%	#	%	#	%	Total votes
Adams	2,247	54.34%	1,888	45.66%	359	8.68%	4,135
Asotin	4,803	54.43%	4,021	45.57%	782	8.86%	8,824
Benton	41,461	55.22%	33,618	44.78%	7,843	10.45%	75,079
Chelan	17,507	58.85%	12,244	41.15%	5,263	17.69%	29,751
Clallam	21,809	60.32%	14,346	39.68%	7,463	20.64%	36,155
Clark	111,601	60.66%	72,392	39.34%	39,209	21.31%	183,993
Columbia	984	50.85%	951	49.15%	33	1.71%	1,935
Cowlitz	24,289	58.48%	17,247	41.52%	7,042	16.95%	41,536
Douglas	7,725	55.61%	6,166	44.39%	1,559	11.22%	13,891
Ferry	1,695	52.51%	1,533	47.49%	162	5.02%	3,228
Franklin	12,544	56.15%	9,795	43.85%	2,749	12.31%	22,339
Garfield	585	54.07%	497	45.93%	88	8.13%	1,082
Grant	12,879	50.29%	12,728	49.71%	151	0.59%	25,607
Grays Harbor	16,893	63.65%	9,646	36.35%	7,247	27.31%	26,539
Island	25,660	64.50%	14,123	35.50%	11,537	29.00%	39,783
Jefferson	13,919	72.69%	5,229	27.31%	8,690	45.38%	19,148
King	724,608	78.30%	200,826	21.70%	523,782	56.60%	925,434
Kitsap	75,893	65.30%	40,324	34.70%	35,569	30.61%	116,217
Kittitas	10,209	60.35%	6,707	39.65%	3,502	20.70%	16,916
Klickitat	5,436	56.35%	4,211	43.65%	1,225	12.70%	9,647
Lewis	16,418	52.85%	14,646	47.15%	1,772	5.70%	31,064
Lincoln	2,396	47.26%	2,674	52.74%	-278	-5.48%	5,070
Mason	16,174	61.90%	9,957	38.10%	6,217	23.79%	26,131
Okanogan	8,799	56.68%	6,726	43.32%	2,073	13.35%	15,525
Pacific	6,188	63.71%	3,525	36.29%	2,663	27.42%	9,713
Pend Oreille	3,121	50.10%	3,109	49.90%	12	0.19%	6,230
Pierce	208,334	64.19%	116,240	35.81%	92,094	28.37%	324,574
San Juan	7,393	73.88%	2,614	26.12%	4,779	47.76%	10,007
Skagit	32,906	63.87%	18,615	36.13%	14,291	27.74%	51,521
Skamania	2,847	56.54%	2,188	43.46%	659	13.09%	5,035
Snohomish	212,974	65.41%	112,640	34.59%	100,334	30.81%	325,614
Spokane	121,452	57.37%	90,240	42.63%	31,212	14.74%	211,692
Stevens	9,632	47.21%	10,770	52.79%	-1,138	-5.58%	20,402
Thurston	83,338	68.21%	38,845	31.79%	44,493	36.42%	122,183
Wahkiakum	1,195	57.93%	868	42.07%	327	15.85%	2,063
Walla Walla	13,403	58.06%	9,681	41.94%	3,722	16.12%	23,084
Whatcom	68,377	67.84%	32,418	32.16%	35,959	35.68%	100,795
Whitman	9,894	62.43%	5,955	37.57%	3,939	24.85%	15,849
Yakima	43,216	59.92%	28,902	40.08%	14,314	19.85%	72,118
Totals	2,000,804	67.14%	979,105	32.86%	1,021,699	34.29%	2,979,909
