= Cynthia Sullivan =

American politician (born 1949)

Member of the King County Council from the 2nd district
- In office January 1, 1984 – January 1, 2004
- Preceded by: Scott Blair
- Succeeded by: Bob Ferguson

Personal details
- Born: 1949 (age 76–77)
- Party: Democratic
- Spouse: Jim Hebert (m. 1999)
- Education: University of Washington (BA)

Cynthia Sullivan (born 1949) is a former member of the King County Council representing District 2 from 1984 to 2004.

== King County Council ==
Sullivan dropped out of her graduate program at the University of Washington in 1983 to run for county council against Republican Scott Blair. She called her opponent an entrenched republican and declared that the county had become "a candy store for developers" because of the republican led council. Sullivan defeated Blair in the general election and credited her win to knocking on more than 1,000 doors in the district.

Early in her career, King County experienced significant population growth, and the council passed a comprehensive redevelopment plan. Sullivan became chair of the committee charged with creating the line between urban growth and other land uses. She focused on growing metropolitan areas while protecting rural, forested, and agricultural areas. Although she ran on slow-growth policies, Sullivan promoted pro-development and pro-mass transit legislation. Sullivan stated, "If growth management fails, it's for two reasons: You didn't build housing where you need it — which is in urban centers — or you didn't build the transportation system to link up those urban centers."

Sullivan and councilmember Greg Nickels endorsed and advocated for a 1988 advisory vote on developing a rail transit system, which voters overwhelmingly approved. This led to the failed vote 1995 vote on the creation of the Regional Transit Authority before the successful creation of Sound Transit in 1996. She would also play a leading role in the creation of a mass-transit bus system to entice more families into the cities.

Sullivan was a reliable progressive vote and was an ardent supporter of rights for gays, women, and minorities. She fought against citizen initiatives by anti-tax advocate Tim Eyman that would reduce the county's income from property taxes and vehicle license fees.

Sullivan faced no serious challenger until her 2003 reelection bid when attorney Bob Ferguson challenged her in the Democratic Primary. Ferguson critiqued Sullivan on her reliance on donations from developers, supporting Sound Transit, and her reluctance to shrink the council from 13 seats to 9. Ferguson called Sullivan an entrenched incumbent as she did in her first election, and touted his campaign knocking on 25,000 doors. In the September primary, Ferguson defeated Sullivan 50.37% to 49.63%, a margin of 143 votes.

After leaving the council, King County Executive Ron Sims named Sullivan the director of the Metropolitan Initiative.

== Personal life ==
While in office, Sullivan divorced her husband and became a single mother on the council.

She married market researcher Jim Hebert in 1999. In 2015, a jury ordered Hebert's company to pay $650,000 to a former employee after he told them to learn English or lose his job. Sullivan supervised the employee until she cut back on her work at Hebert Research in August 2011, and was able to communicate effectively with the employee. The couple would file for bankruptcy, with the biggest liability being the $650,000 judgment against Hebert Research.
