= List of first gentlemen in the United States =

In the United States, the title of first gentleman may be accorded to a man who is married to the head of state of a state government, analogously to the unofficial use of first lady for the wife or hostess of a head of state, including the wife of the president of the United States. Doug Emhoff became the first second gentleman of the United States when his wife Kamala Harris became vice president in 2021.

The first man to formally serve as first gentleman was James E. Ferguson in 1925, a former governor of Texas who had been impeached and removed from office due to corruption charges in 1917, and whose wife Miriam A. Ferguson later won the office. The first man to serve as first gentleman without having previously served as governor was Thomas Grasso in 1975, husband of Connecticut governor Ella T. Grasso. In 2019, Colorado governor Jared Polis' husband Marlon Reis (who at the time was his partner), became the first same-sex partner to receive the title of First Gentleman (in addition to being the first same-sex partner of a sitting governor).

Even though Arizona has had the most female governors of any U.S. state with five, only three of these governors were married to a first gentleman while in office. Six states have had more than one first gentleman: New Hampshire with four, Arizona and Kansas with three each, and Connecticut, Michigan, and Oregon, with two each respectively.

== First gentlemen by state ==
State	First gentleman	Started role	Governor
Alabama	George Wallace	1967	Lurleen Wallace
Alaska	Todd Palin	2006	Sarah Palin
Arizona	Terry Hull	1997	Jane Dee Hull
Arizona	John Brewer	2009	Jan Brewer
Arizona	Patrick Goodman*	2023	Katie Hobbs
Arkansas	Bryan Sanders^{*}	2023	Sarah Huckabee Sanders
Colorado	Marlon Reis^{*} (Note: How should we refer to Governor-elect Jared Polis’ longtime partner? The Denver Post. 8 November 2018. "Polis and Reis aren’t legally married... The Polis campaign has clarified that Reis will take the title 'first gentleman'".)	2019	Jared Polis
Connecticut	Thomas Grasso	1975	Ella T. Grasso
Connecticut	Lou Rell	2004	Jodi Rell
Delaware	Dana Long	2025	Bethany Hall-Long
Iowa	Kevin Reynolds^{*}	2017	Kim Reynolds
Kansas	Spencer Finney Jr.	1991	Joan Finney
Kansas	K. Gary Sebelius	2003	Kathleen Sebelius
Kansas	Ted Daughety	2019	Laura Kelly
Kentucky	Bill Collins	1983	Martha Layne Collins
Louisiana	Raymond Blanco	2004	Kathleen Blanco
Massachusetts	Chuck Hunt	2001	Jane Swift (acting)
Michigan	Daniel Mulhern	2003	Jennifer Granholm
Michigan	Marc Mallory^{*}	2019	Gretchen Whitmer
Montana	Harry Martz	2001	Judy Martz
Nebraska	Bill Orr	1987	Kay A. Orr
New Hampshire	Albert L. Roy	1982	Vesta M. Roy (acting)
New Hampshire	Bill Shaheen	1997	Jeanne Shaheen
New Hampshire	Thomas Hassan	2013	Maggie Hassan
New Hampshire	Joseph Daley*	2025	Kelly Ayotte
New Jersey	John Whitman	1994	Christine Todd Whitman
New Jersey	Jason Hedberg*	2026	Mikie Sherrill
New Mexico	Chuck Franco	2011	Susana Martinez
New Mexico	Manuel Cordova*	2022	Michelle Lujan Grisham
New York	William J. Hochul Jr.*	2021	Kathy Hochul
North Carolina	Bob Eaves	2009	Bev Perdue
Ohio	Jeff Hollister	1998	Nancy Hollister
Oklahoma	Wade Christensen	2011	Mary Fallin
Oregon	Frank L. Roberts	1991	Barbara Roberts
Oregon	Dan Little	2015	Kate Brown
Rhode Island	Andrew Moffit	2015	Gina Raimondo
South Carolina	Michael Haley	2011	Nikki Haley
South Dakota	Bryon Noem	2019	Kristi Noem
Texas	James E. Ferguson	1925	Miriam A. Ferguson
Utah	Myron Walker	2003	Olene Walker
Vermont	Arthur Kunin	1985	Madeleine Kunin
Virginia	Adam Spanberger*	2026	Abigail Spanberger
Washington	Michael Gregoire	2005	Christine Gregoire

^{*} Currently serving

== First gentlemen by U.S. territory ==
Territory	First gentleman	Started role	Governor/Mayor
Guam	Jeffrey Cook^{*}	2019	Lou Leon Guerrero
Puerto Rico	Adolfo Krans; Ramón Cantero Frau	2001; 2003	Sila María Calderón
Puerto Rico	Jorge Díaz Reverón	2019	Wanda Vázquez Garced
Puerto Rico	José Yovin Vargas*	2025	Jenniffer González-Colón
District of Columbia	James R. Kelly	1991	Sharon Pratt Kelly

^{*} Currently serving

== See also ==
- List of current United States first spouses
- List of female governors in the United States
- "Oh, Jeez" (2016), the seventh episode in the twentieth season of South Park, previously called "The Very First Gentleman".
