= List of first spouses of South Carolina =

Hostess of the South Carolina Governor's Mansion

First Spouse of South Carolina
- Incumbent; Peggy Anderson since January 24, 2017
- Style: First Lady or First Gentleman
- Residence: South Carolina Governor's Mansion
- Inaugural holder: Elizabeth Grimké
- Formation: January 9, 1776 (250 years ago)
- Website: governor.sc.gov/first-lady

The first spouse of South Carolina is the title held by the host of the South Carolina Governor's Mansion, usually the spouse of the governor of South Carolina, concurrent with the governor's term in office.

Peggy Anderson is the current first lady of South Carolina, assuming the position on January 24, 2017, as the wife of 117th and current South Carolina governor Henry McMaster, with whom she has two children.

To date, only one person has served as the first gentleman since statehood is Michael Haley from 2011-2017. Michael is the husband of Former Governor Nikki Haley.

== Role ==
The position of the first spouse is not an elected one, carries no official duties, and receives no salary. However, the first spouse holds a highly visible position in the state government. The role of the first spouse is the host of the South Carolina Governor's Mansion and organizes and attends official ceremonies and functions of state either along with, or in place of, the governor.

It is common for the governor's spouse to select specific, non-political, causes to promote.

== First spouses of South Carolina ==
- Peggy Anderson (2017–present)
- Michael Haley (soldier) (2011–2017)
- Jenny Sanford (2003-2010)
- Rachel Gardner (1999-2003)
- Mary Wood Payne (1995-1999)
- Iris Campbell (1987-1995)
- Ann Yarborough (1979-1987)
- Ann Darlington (1975-1979
- Lois Rhame West (1971-1975)
- Josephine Robinson (1965-1975)
- Lucy Pickens (1860-1862)
- Theodosia Burr Alston (1812-1813)

== Gallery ==
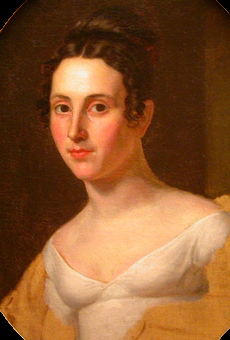
Theodosia Burr Alston

== See also ==
- List of current United States first spouses
