= First ladies and gentlemen of Washington =

Title of the spouse of the governor of Washington

First Lady of Washington
- Seal of Washington

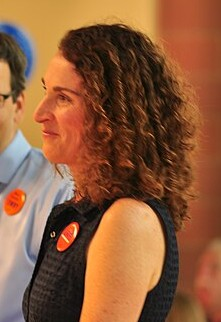
- Current; Colleen Ferguson since January 15, 2025
- Style: Mrs. Ferguson; Madam First Lady
- Residence: Governor's Mansion
- Inaugural holder: Sarah Brown Kellog
- Formation: November 11, 1889 (136 years ago)
- Website: Official website

First lady or first gentleman of Washington is the title attributed to the wife or husband of the governor of Washington. The holder of the title resides with the governor at the Washington Governor's Mansion in Olympia, Washington.

The current first lady of Washington is Colleen Ferguson, wife of Governor Bob Ferguson, who has held the position since January 15, 2025. To date, only one person has served as the first gentleman since statehood: Mike Gregoire from 2005 to 2013.

== First ladies and gentlemen of Washington since statehood ==
First Lady/Gentleman	Term begins	Term ends	Governor	Notes
Lois Murphy	January 14, 1981	January 16, 1985	John Spellman	
Jean Forstrom	January 16, 1985	January 13, 1993	Booth Gardner	
Mary Carlson	January 13, 1993	January 15, 1997	Mike Lowry	
Mona Lee	January 15, 1997	January 12, 2005	Gary Locke	
Mike Gregoire	January 12, 2005	January 16, 2013	Christine Gregoire	The first man to serve as First Gentleman.
Trudi Tindall	January 16, 2013	January 15, 2025	Jay Inslee	
Colleen Ferguson	January 15, 2025	Current	Bob Ferguson	
