= Brian T. Moran =

American attorney

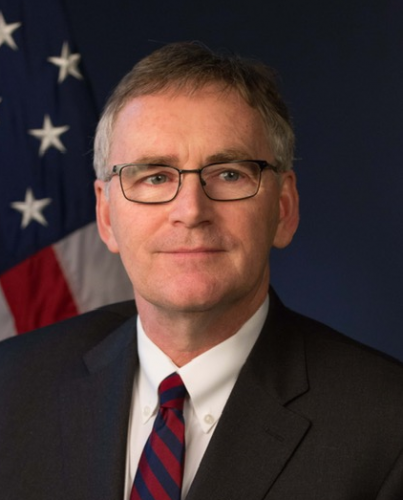

United States Attorney for the Western District of Washington
- In office January 17, 2019 – February 28, 2021
- President: Donald Trump; Joe Biden
- Preceded by: Annette Hayes (acting)
- Succeeded by: Tessa M. Gorman (acting)

Personal details
- Education: Middlebury College (BA); Seattle University (JD)

Brian T. Moran is an American attorney who served as the United States Attorney for the Western District of Washington from 2019 to 2021. He was previously of counsel at the law firm Orrick, Herrington & Sutcliffe in Seattle, Washington.

== Education ==
He earned his Bachelor of Arts from Middlebury College and his Juris Doctor from Seattle University School of Law.

== Legal career ==
Prior to his joining private practice, he served as the Chief Deputy Attorney General in the Office of the Washington State Attorney General from 2006 to 2013. From 1998 to 2006, he served as the state Attorney General's Chief Criminal Prosecutor where he and his staff assisted Washington's 39 county prosecutors' offices with the investigation and prosecution of violent crimes, conflict cases and sexually violent predator matters. Before joining the Washington Attorney General's office, he spent 10 years as a Senior Deputy Prosecuting Attorney in Kitsap County prosecuting homicides and other violent crimes.

Moran tried hundreds of cases, including 35 homicides and three death-penalty cases. He pioneered the use of DNA evidence in murder cases.

== U.S. Attorney for the Western District of Washington ==
On May 10, 2018, President Trump nominated Moran to become the next United States Attorney for the Western District of Washington. On May 15, 2018, his nomination was sent to the Senate. On January 2, 2019, his nomination was confirmed by voice vote. He was sworn into office on January 17, 2019.

On February 8, 2021, he along with 55 other Trump-era attorneys were asked to resign. He announced his resignation the following day, effective February 28 and rejoined his former law firm, Orrick, as a partner covering public policy.
