= Tessa M. Gorman =

American lawyer

United States Attorney for the Western District of Washington
- In office June 23, 2023 – February 13, 2025; Acting: June 23, 2023 – January 16, 2024
- President: Joe Biden; Donald Trump
- Preceded by: Nicholas W. Brown
- Acting; March 1, 2021 – October 8, 2021
- President: Joe Biden
- Succeeded by: Nicholas W. Brown

Personal details
- Born: 1970 or 1971 (age 55–56) Ukiah, California, U.S.
- Education: Yale University (BA); University of California, Berkeley (JD)

Tessa M. Gorman (born 1970/1971) is an American lawyer from Washington who was the United States Attorney for the Western District of Washington. In January 2024, Attorney General Merrick Garland appointed Gorman to the position after she had served as Acting United States Attorney for six months. In May 2024, the judges of the United States District Court for the Western District of Washington appointed Gorman to continue as the United States Attorney for the district.

Gorman previously served as Acting United States Attorney in 2021. She served as Criminal Chief for the office from 2013 to 2019, and in 2019, she was named First Assistant United States Attorney. Gorman began her legal career in 1998 as an attorney in the Department of Justice's Honors Program.

In 2018, with the support of Senators Patty Murray and Maria Cantwell, President Donald Trump announced that he planned to nominate Gorman to become a United States district judge of the same court, but the nomination was never submitted to the U.S. Senate due to the Washington senators' opposition to the White House's Ninth Circuit nominee.

== Education ==
Gorman earned her Bachelor of Arts from Yale University, where she was a member of the varsity track and field team, and her Juris Doctor from the UC Berkeley School of Law, where she served as an editor of the California Law Review.

== Legal career ==
After graduating from law school, Gorman served as a law clerk to Judge Douglas P. Woodlock of the United States District Court for the District of Massachusetts.

After completing her clerkship, Gorman served as an Honors Trial Attorney in the United States Department of Justice Criminal Division in Washington, D.C. During that time, she served as a Special Assistant United States Attorney in the United States Attorneys' Offices for the District of Columbia and the Eastern District of Virginia. She became an Assistant United States Attorney for the Western District of Washington in 2001.

Gorman served as Criminal Chief for the Western District of Washington from 2013 until 2019. In 2019, she was named First Assistant United States Attorney, and Gorman served in that role under both United States Attorneys Brian T. Moran and Nicholas W. Brown. On March 1, 2021, she became the Acting U.S. Attorney after the resignation of Brian T. Moran and again in 2023, after the resignation of Nicholas W. Brown.

In January 2024, Attorney General Merrick B. Garland appointed Gorman the United States Attorney for the Western District of Washington, and in May 2024, the Judges of the United States District Court for the Western District of Washington appointed Gorman to be the United States Attorney.

In February 2025, Gorman was removed from her post amid a purge of several top federal prosecutors removed from their posts across the country, including in southern California, Maryland and Washington State

== Nomination to district court ==
On July 13, 2018, President Donald Trump announced his intention to nominate Gorman to a seat on the United States District Court for the Western District of Washington. Gorman was to be nominated to the seat on the United States District Court for the Western District of Washington vacated by Judge Robert S. Lasnik, who took senior status on January 27, 2016. However, due to a dispute between the White House and Washington's Senators over a separate nomination, the nomination was never submitted to the Senate.
