= Noah Purcell =

American lawyer

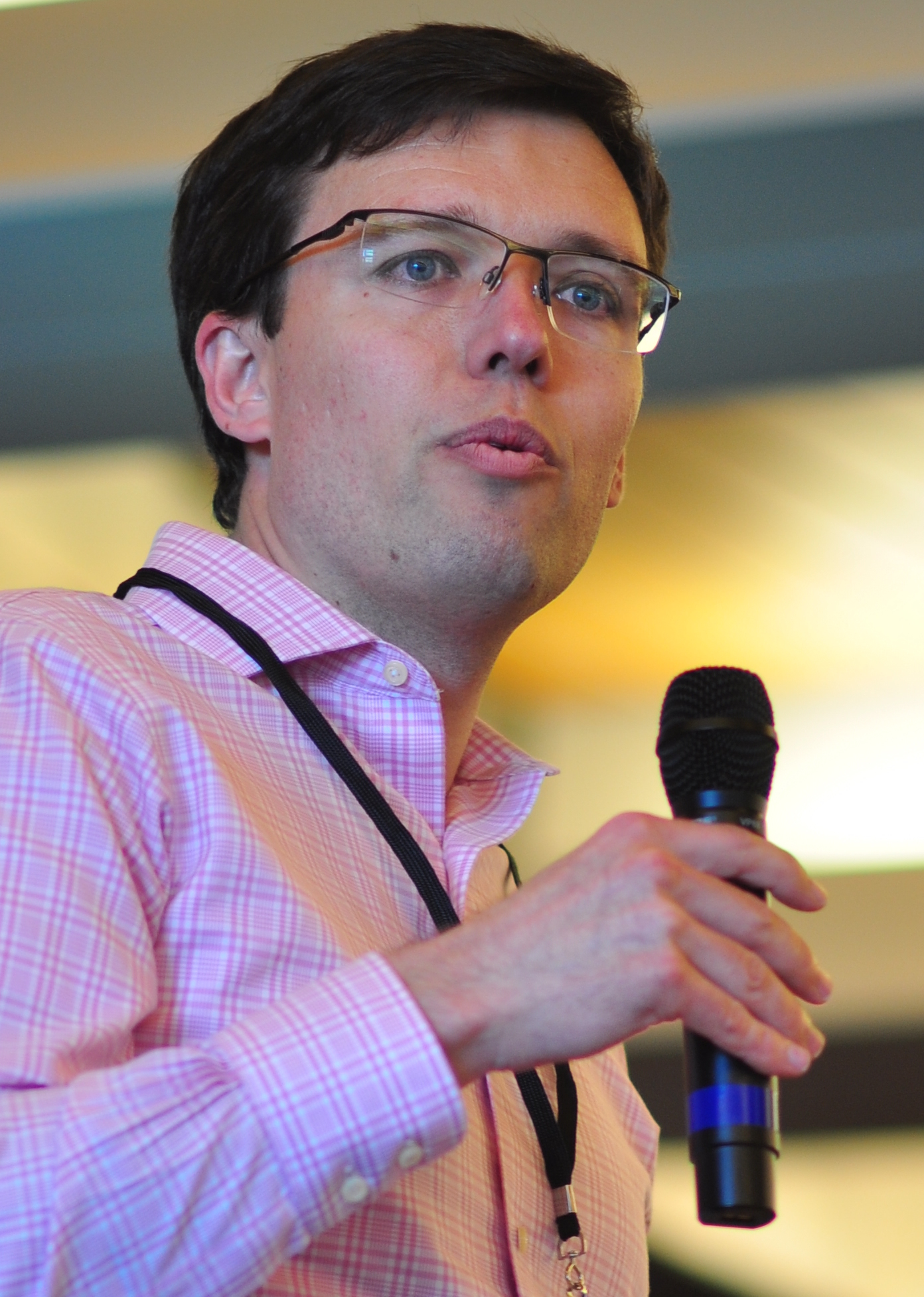
- Purcell in 2018

Solicitor General of Washington
- Incumbent
- Assumed office January 16, 2013
- Attorney General: Bob Ferguson; Nick Brown
- Preceded by: Maureen Hart

Personal details
- Born: Noah Guzzo Purcell; 1980 (age 45–46) Seattle, Washington, U.S.
- Party: Democratic
- Education: University of Washington (BA); Harvard University (JD)

Noah Guzzo Purcell (born 1980) is an American attorney serving as the solicitor general of the U.S. state of Washington. He gained national attention when he halted President Donald Trump's first travel ban with a successful lawsuit on behalf of the State of Washington in Washington v. Trump.

== Early life and education ==
Born in Seattle, Purcell graduated from Franklin High School in the Mount Baker neighborhood. He graduated from the University of Washington in 2002, where he earned a Mary Gates Leadership award for his work on affordable tuition. He later earned a Juris Doctor from Harvard Law School, where he served as an editor of the Harvard Law Review.

== Career ==
After graduating from Harvard Law School, Purcell clerked for Associate Justice of the Supreme Court David Souter and D.C. Circuit Court of Appeals Judge David S. Tatel.

From 2009 to 2010, Purcell served in the United States Department of Homeland Security, where he worked to challenge Arizona's immigration law implemented during the administration of Jan Brewer. Prior to his appointment to the office of the Solicitor General, he was an associate at Seattle law firm Perkins Coie, where he worked on appellate matters. Purcell has litigation experience and knowledge as in the areas of constitutional issues, campaign financing, and environmental law, and administrative law.

=== Solicitor general of Washington ===
Purcell succeeded retiring solicitor general, Maureen Hart. Purcell is a member of the King County Bar Association, and was awarded the Friend of the Legal Profession Award by the association in 2017.

=== Travel ban case ===
Under Washington Attorney General Bob Ferguson, Purcell led the state's challenge to Donald Trump's Executive Order 13769, which restricted travel to the United States from seven Muslim-majority nations. Purcell argued the state's case before Judge James Robart of the United States District Court for the Western District of Washington and a panel of the Ninth Circuit Court of Appeals.

After the successful halt of President Trump's first travel ban, Ferguson, Purcell and Robart were named one of the most influential Seattleites of 2017 by Seattle Magazine. Purcell has spoken about how the travel ban had a personal impact on his family because his wife is the daughter of Iranian immigrants who fled their country in the 1970s.

=== Political career ===
On April 4, 2019, Purcell announced that he would form an exploratory committee to consider a run for attorney general of Washington. He stated he would only run if Bob Ferguson, the incumbent attorney general, ran for governor. After failing to gain traction in the 2020 Democratic Party presidential primaries, Jay Inslee announced he would seek re-election in the 2020 Washington gubernatorial election. Thus, Ferguson did not run for governor, and Purcell announced the dissolution of the exploratory committee.

== See also ==
- List of law clerks for the third seat of the Supreme Court of the United States

Legal offices
Preceded by Maureen Hart	Solicitor General of Washington; 2013–present	Incumbent
