= Scott Blair =

American politician

Member of the King County Council from the 2nd district
- In office January 1, 1980 – January 1, 1984
- Preceded by: Bob Dunn
- Succeeded by: Cynthia Sullivan

Member of the Washington House of Representatives from the 46th district
- In office January 11, 1971 – December 15, 1979
- Preceded by: Audley F. Mahaffey
- Succeeded by: William H. “Skeeter” Ellis

Personal details
- Born: December 15, 1929 (age 96)
- Party: Republican

E. Scott Blair (born December 15, 1929) is an American politician who served as a member of the King County Council from 1980 to 1984. A member of the Republican Party, he represented the 2nd district.
