= Colleen Ferguson =

First Lady of Washington since 2025

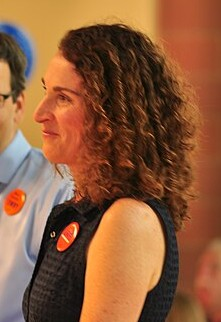
- Ferguson in 2017

First Lady of Washington
- Current
- Assumed role January 15, 2025
- Governor: Bob Ferguson
- Preceded by: Trudi Tindall

Personal details
- Party: Democratic
- Spouse: Bob Ferguson (m. 2004)
- Children: 2
- Education: University of Puget Sound (BA); University of Washington (M.Ed.)

Colleen Ferguson is an American educator who has served as the first lady of Washington since 2025 as the wife of Governor Bob Ferguson.

== Early life and education ==
Ferguson grew up in Oregon and attended the University of Puget Sound, where she earned a degree in international relations and foreign languages. As part of her undergraduate studies, she spent a semester at the University of Alicante in Spain.

After graduation, Ferguson taught English in Japan before returning to the United States to pursue graduate studies. She earned a Master of Education at the University of Washington.

== Career ==
Ferguson has worked in international education for more than 20 years. Her career has included teaching intercultural communication, developing and managing study abroad and teaching abroad programs, establishing international college partnerships, and advising students. She has also administered federal grants aimed at internationalizing campus curricula and has traveled abroad to meet with prospective students and their families.

== First Lady of Washington (2025–present) ==
Ferguson became the first lady of Washington when her husband, Bob Ferguson, took office as governor in 2025. Because she continues to work full-time, her public schedule as first lady is limited. She has emphasised education, global learning, and personal growth as areas of interest during her tenure. Ferguson has also expressed her commitment to encouraging Washingtonians to explore beyond their comfort zones and approach new experiences with openness.

== Personal life ==
Ferguson and her husband, Bob Ferguson, have been married for over 20 years. They are the parents of twins, Jack and Katie. Ferguson and her husband are Catholic.

== See also ==
- First ladies and gentlemen of Washington
- Bob Ferguson (politician)
