= Nick Brown (lawyer) =

American lawyer (born 1977)

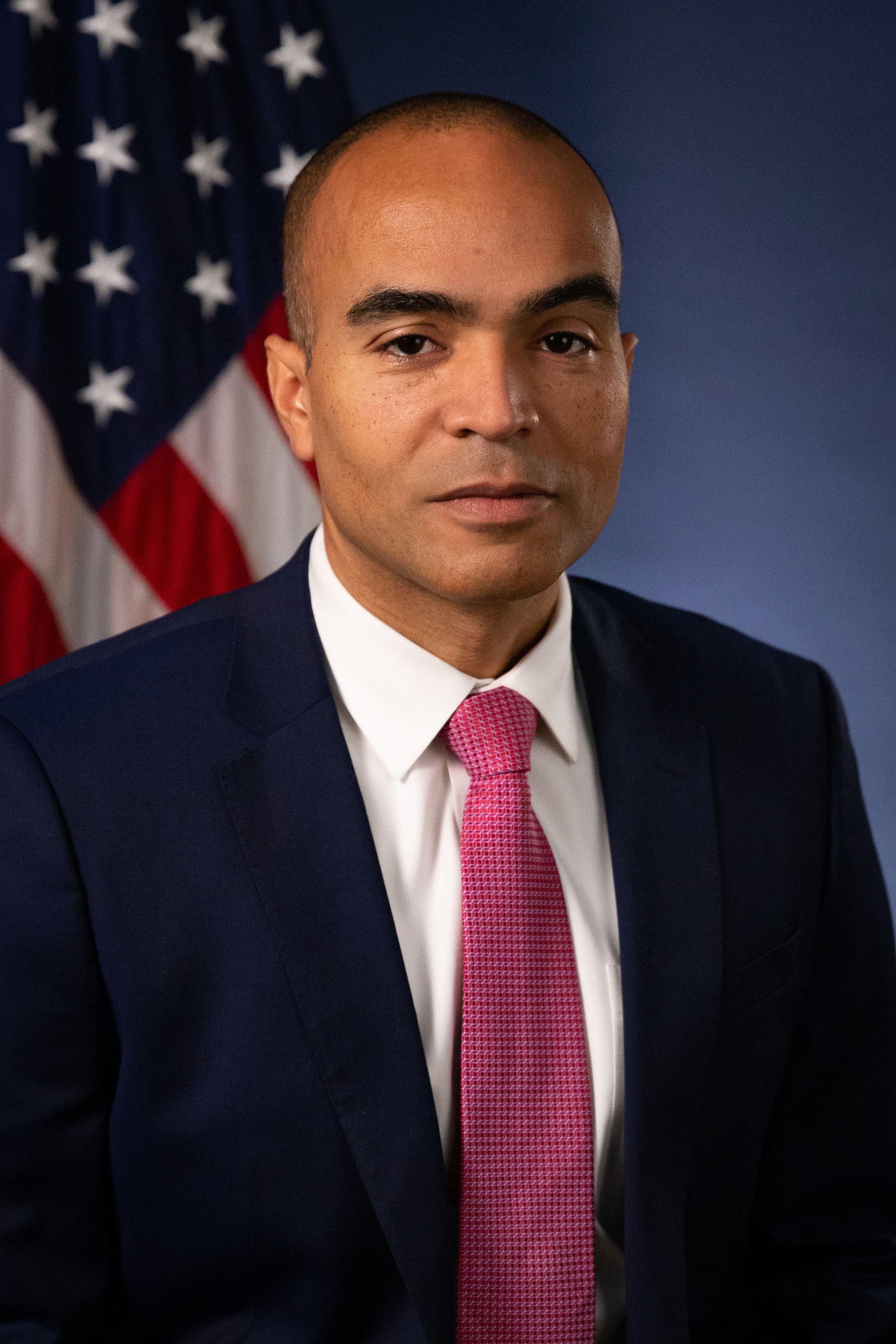
- Official portrait, 2021

19th Attorney General of Washington
- Incumbent
- Assumed office January 15, 2025
- Governor: Bob Ferguson
- Preceded by: Bob Ferguson

United States Attorney for the Western District of Washington
- In office October 8, 2021 – June 21, 2023
- President: Joe Biden
- Preceded by: Tessa M. Gorman (acting)
- Succeeded by: Tessa M. Gorman

Personal details
- Born: Nicholas William Brown; April 2, 1977 (age 49) Steilacoom, Washington, U.S.
- Party: Democratic
- Children: 2
- Education: Morehouse College (BA); Harvard University (JD)

Military service
- Allegiance: United States
- Branch: United States Army

Nicholas William Brown (born April 2, 1977) is an American lawyer serving as the 19th attorney general of Washington since 2025. He served as United States attorney for the Western District of Washington from October 2021 to June 21, 2023, and was elected the attorney general for Washington in November 2024. Brown is the first African American to serve as Attorney General of Washington.

== Early life and education ==
Born in Steilacoom, Washington, Brown received his Bachelor of Arts degree from Morehouse College in 1999 and his Juris Doctor from Harvard University in 2002.

== Career ==
=== Survivor ===
In 2000, Brown was a contestant on the second season of Survivor, Survivor: The Australian Outback. He was the 10th contestant eliminated, thus placing 7th, and became the third member of the jury.

=== Judge advocate general ===
Brown began his legal career as a judge advocate general in the United States Army, serving as both a prosecutor and defense counsel. His practice included being trial counsel at Joint Base Lewis–McChord, trial defense counsel for the United States Army Trial Defense Service, Fort Bliss, Texas, and Baghdad, Iraq, and legal assistance attorney and tax officer for the U.S. Army Air Defense Artillery Center at Fort Bliss. From 2007 to 2013, he was an assistant United States attorney for the Western District of Washington. From 2013 to 2017, he served as general counsel to Governor Jay Inslee.

=== U.S. attorney for the Western District of Washington ===
In January 2021, senators Patty Murray and Maria Cantwell recommended Brown to the post of U.S. attorney for Western Washington.

On July 26, 2021, President Joe Biden nominated Brown to be the United States attorney for the Western District of Washington. On September 23, 2021, his nomination was reported out of committee. On September 30, 2021, his nomination was confirmed in the United States Senate by voice vote. On October 8, 2021, he was sworn in by Chief Judge Ricardo S. Martinez.

=== 2024 Washington attorney general election ===
In May 2023, it was reported that Brown had expressed interest in mounting a candidacy for Attorney General of Washington in the 2024 election. Brown announced on June 20, 2023, that he would resign as U.S. attorney, effective the next day, and joined Pacifica Law Group LLP as a partner, where he worked while running for office. Brown officially joined the race on July 12.

In 2024, Brown won the election and is the first African American to hold the office.

== Personal life ==
Brown lives in Seattle with his wife and their two children.

Legal offices
Preceded by Tessa M. Gorman; Acting	United States Attorney for the Western District of Washington; 2021–2023	Succeeded by Tessa M. Gorman
Legal offices
Preceded by Bob Ferguson	Attorney General of Washington; 2025–present	Incumbent
