= Reagan Dunn =

American politician

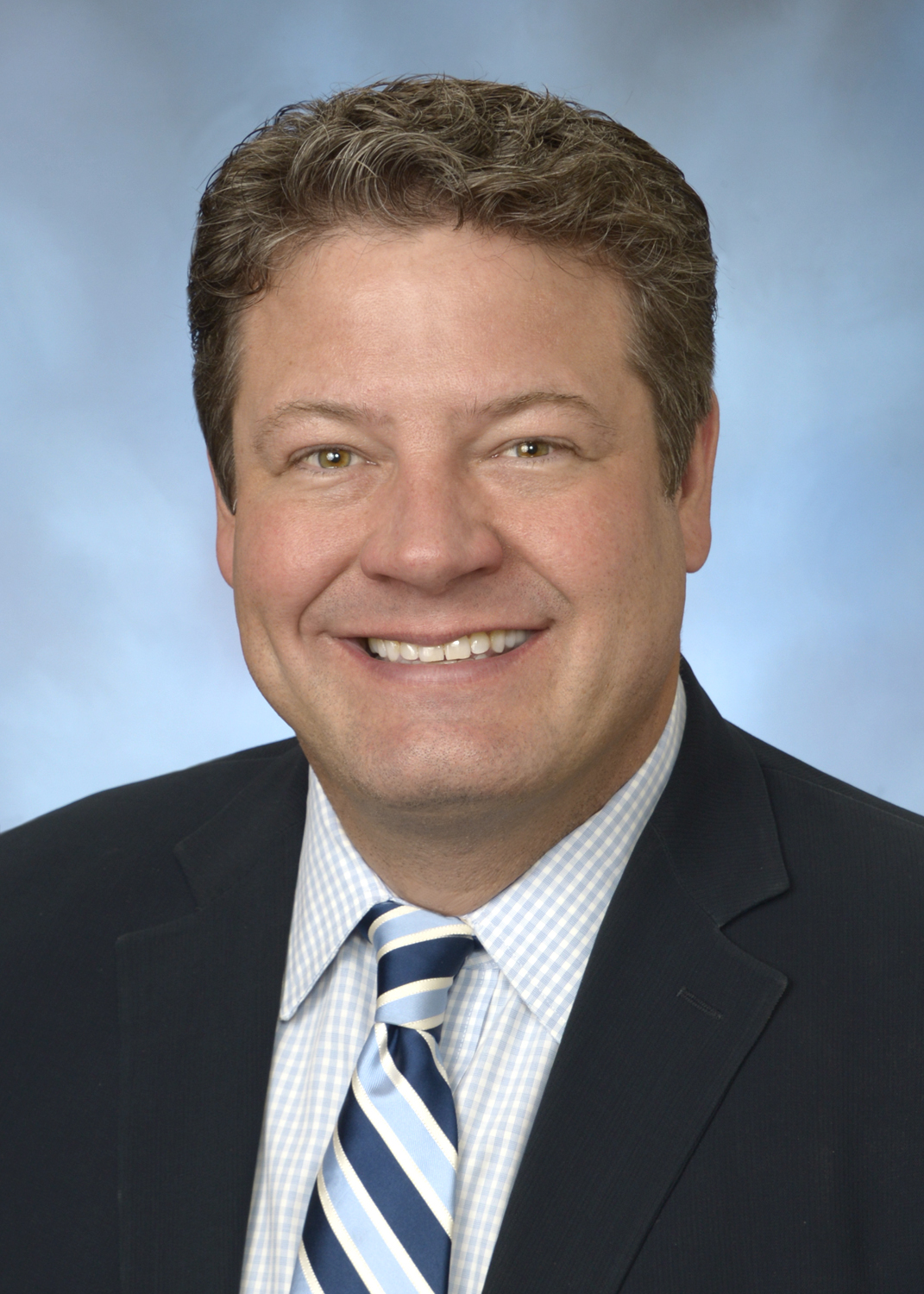

Member of the King County Council
- Incumbent
- Assumed office 2005

Personal details
- Born: Reagan Blackburn Dunn; 1971 (age 53–54) Bellevue, Washington, U.S.
- Party: Republican
- Spouses: Paige Green (m. 2006; div. 2015) Ashley Wilson (m. 2019)
- Children: 2
- Relatives: Jennifer Dunn (mother)
- Education: Arizona State University (BA); University of Washington (JD)
- Website: Official website

Reagan Blackburn Dunn (born 1971) is an American politician and former federal prosecutor who serves on the nonpartisan King County Council, representing District 9 in Southeast King County, Washington. District 9 includes the cities of Bellevue, Newcastle, Renton, Maple Valley, Covington, Black Diamond, and Enumclaw, as well as sprawling unincorporated areas.

Prior to his service on the King County Council, Dunn was a federal prosecutor and appointee in the US Department of Justice. As senior counsel to the Director for the Executive Executive Office for United States Attorneys, he helped create Project Safe Neighborhoods, a national initiative against gun violence.

== Early life and education ==
Dunn is a son of former Congresswoman Jennifer Dunn. He was named after former President Ronald Reagan and grew up in Bellevue, Washington. Dunn earned a Bachelor of Arts degree from Arizona State University. In 1998, he earned his Juris Doctor from University of Washington School of Law.

== Career ==
After graduating from law school, Dunn joined the law firm of Inslee, Doezie & Ryder, P.S. in Bellevue.

In 2001, Dunn was appointed by President George W. Bush to serve in the United States Department of Justice (DOJ) as senior counsel to the director for the Executive Executive Office for United States Attorneys. In this capacity, he was the first national coordinator of Project Safe Neighborhoods, which he helped to author.

He later served as counsel to the assistant attorney general for the Office of Justice Programs and attorney advisor for the Department of Justice's Office of Public Affairs.

Following the September 11 attacks, Dunn was a Department of Justice delegate on President Bush's Task Force on Citizen Preparedness, where he helped form the USA Freedom Corps, Citizen Corps, and the Volunteers in Police Service Program and led efforts to expand the National Neighborhood Watch Program to include terrorism awareness. Dunn also participated in the investigation of Zacarias Moussaoui in the Eastern District of Virginia.

Dunn was appointed to the King County Council in 2005, and elected to the position that same year.

In 2012, he ran for Attorney General of Washington. He received 47 percent of the vote, losing the election to Bob Ferguson.

On November 29, 2021, Dunn launched an unsuccessful campaign for the U.S. House of Representatives in the 8th district against two-term incumbent Democrat Kim Schrier in 2022.

== Personal life ==
Dunn lives in Covington, Washington, with his wife Ashley. He has two children from a previous marriage.

In 2014, Dunn pleaded guilty to driving under the influence. In 2022, he first spoke publicly about his past struggles with alcoholism, crediting his journey to sobriety with inspiring him to advocate for public policy that helps people in recovery.

== Electoral history ==
November 2005 King County Council District #9 General
Party	Candidate	Votes	%
Republican	Reagan Dunn	36,947	62.14
Democratic	Shirley A. Gaunt-Smith	22,283	37.47
N/A	Write-in	232	0.39

November 2009 King County Council District #9 General
Party	Candidate	Votes	%
Nonpartisan	Reagan Dunn	44,000	77.19
Nonpartisan	Beverly Harison Tonda	12,820	22.49
N/A	Write-in	179	.31

November 2012 Washington State Attorney General - General Election
Party	Candidate	Votes	%
Democratic	Bob Ferguson	1,564,443	53.48
Republican	Reagan Dunn	1,361,010	46.52
