= 2012 Washington Attorney General election =

- November 6, 2012
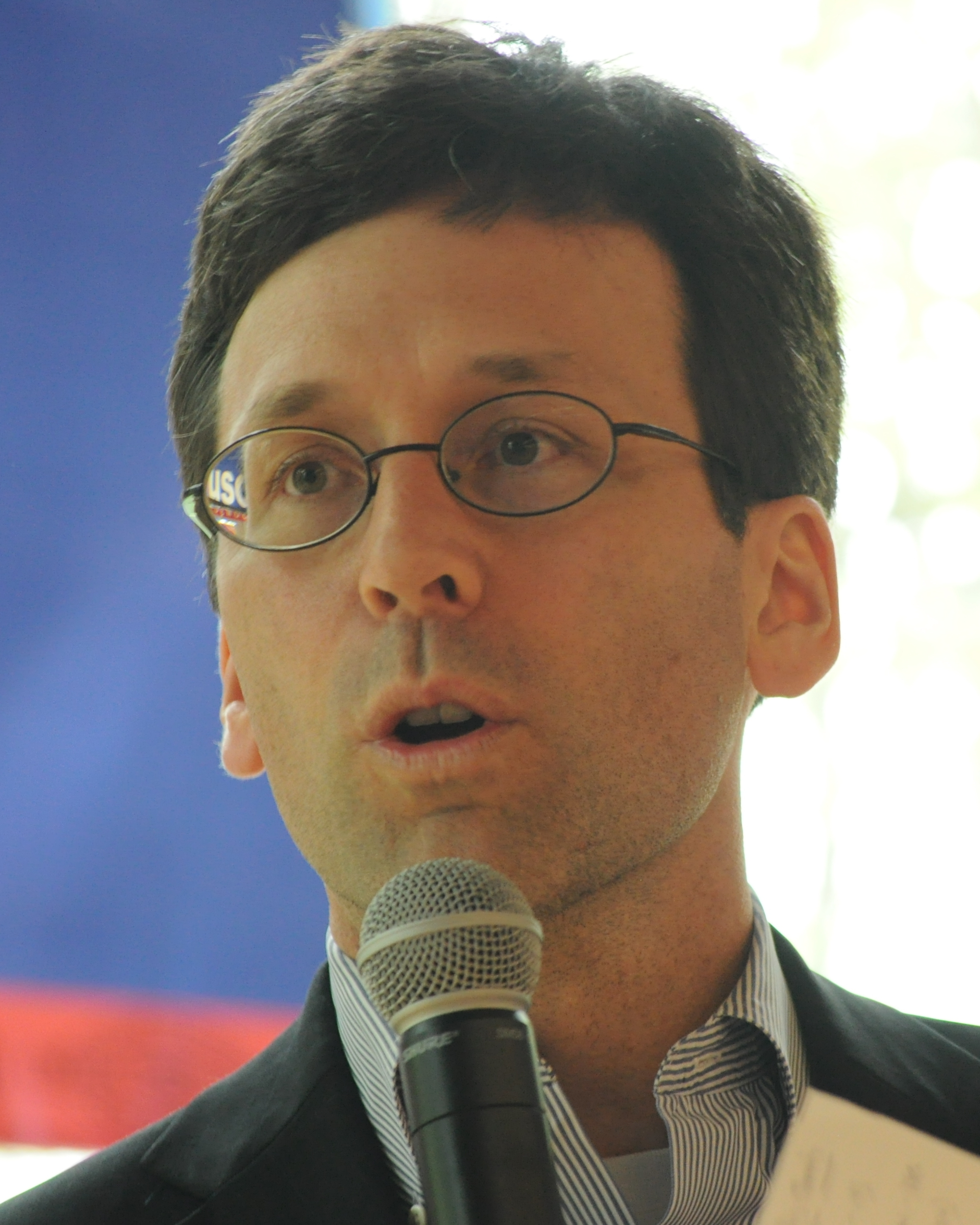

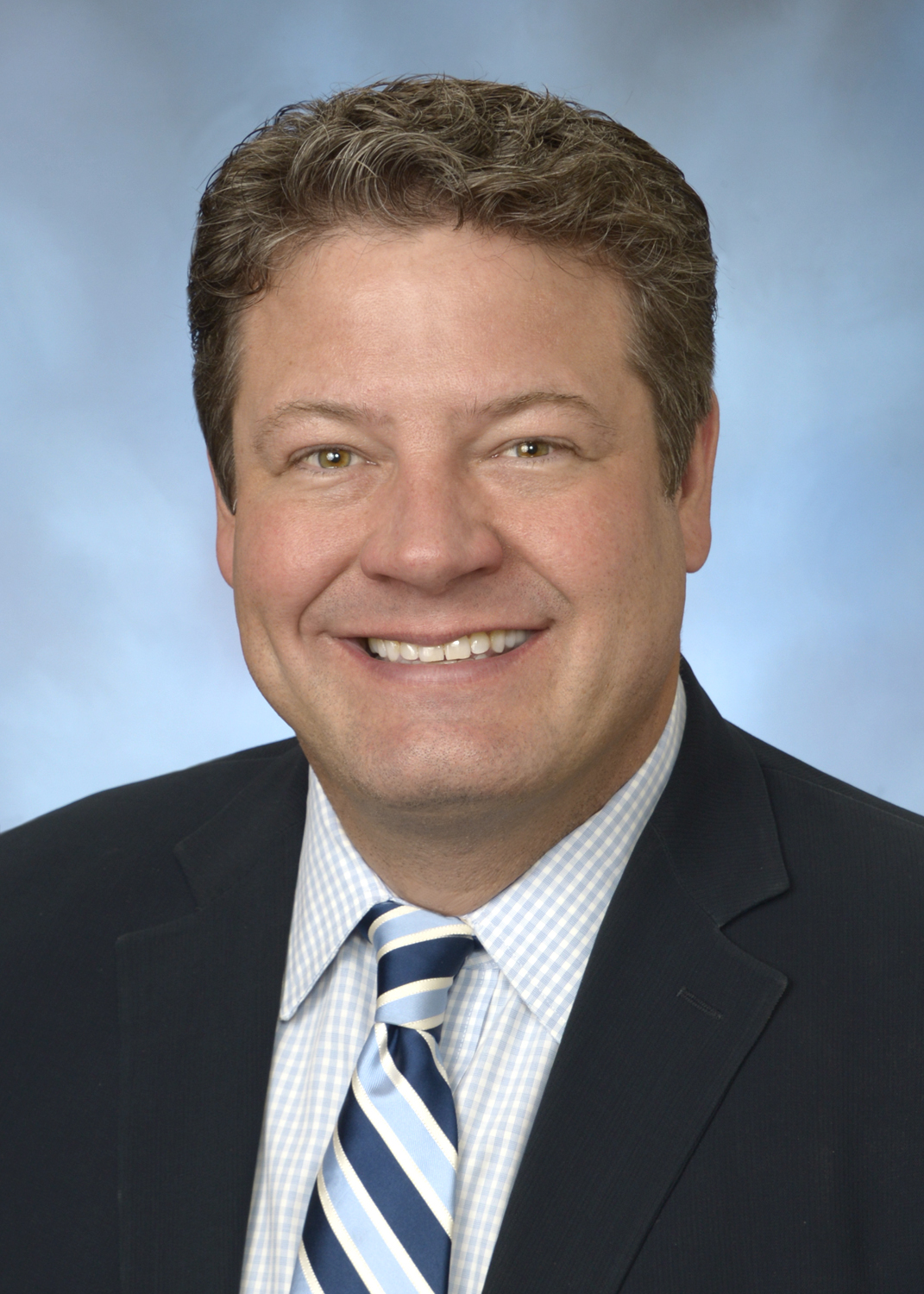
Nominee	Bob Ferguson	Reagan Dunn
Party	Democratic	Republican
Popular vote	1,564,443	1,361,010
Percentage	53.48%	46.52%
- Ferguson: 50–60% 60–70% 70–80% 80–90% >90% Dunn: 50–60% 60–70% 70–80% 80–90% >90% Tie: 50% No votes
Attorney General before election
Rob McKenna
Republican
Elected Attorney General
Bob Ferguson
Democratic

The 2012 Washington Attorney General election was held on November 6, 2012, concurrently with the other statewide elections and the gubernatorial election. Incumbent Republican State Attorney General Rob McKenna retired to run for governor. Democratic King County Councilmember Bob Ferguson won the general election over Republican King County Councilmember Reagan Dunn.

== Primary election ==
=== Democratic Party ===
==== Advanced to general ====
- Bob Ferguson, King County Councilmember

=== Democratic Party ===
==== Advanced to general ====
- Reagan Dunn, King County Councilmember

==== Eliminated in primary ====
- Stephen Pidgeon, attorney and anti-gay activist

==== Declined ====
- Rob McKenna, incumbent attorney general (2005–2013) (ran for governor)

=== Endorsements ===
Reagan Dunn (R)

Federal officials

- William D. Hyslop, former United States Attorney for the Eastern District of Washington (1991–1993)
- Jim McDevitt, former United States Attorney for the Eastern District of Washington (2001–2010)
- John McKay, former United States Attorney for the Western District of Washington (2001–2006)
- Mike McKay, former United States Attorney for the Western District of Washington (1989–1993)
- Jeff Sullivan, former United States Attorney for the Western District of Washington (2007–2009)

Statewide officials

- Ken Eikenberry, former attorney general of Washington (1981–1993)
- Rob McKenna, attorney general of Washington (2005–2013)

Newspapers

- The Seattle Times
Bob Ferguson (D)

Statewide officials

- Mike Lowry, former governor of Washington (1993–1997)

Local officials

- Dow Constantine, King County Executive (2009–2025)

=== Results ===
County results Ferguson: 40–50%; 50–60%; 60–70%; Dunn: 40–50%; 50–60%

Congressional district results Ferguson: 40–50%; 50–60%; 70–80%; Dunn: 40–50%

Primary election results
Party	Candidate	Votes	%
Democratic	Bob Ferguson	685,346	51.68
Republican	Reagan Dunn	506,524	38.20
Republican	Stephen Pidgeon	134,185	10.12
Total votes		1,326,055	100.00

==== By county ====
Combined partisan vote by county Democratic: 50–60%; 60–70%; Republican: 50–60%; 60–70%; 70–80%

Combined partisan vote by congressional district Democratic: 50–60%; 70–80%; Republican: 50–60%; 60–70%

County results
County	Reagan Dunn Republican		Bob Ferguson Democratic		Stephen Pidgeon Republican		Margin		Total votes
County	#	%	#	%	#	%	#	%	Total votes
Adams	1,397	58.28%	659	27.49%	341	14.23%	-738	-30.79%	2,397
Asotin	1,935	41.96%	1,993	43.21%	684	14.83%	58	1.26%	4,612
Benton	15,106	50.31%	10,285	34.25%	4,635	15.44%	-4,821	-16.06%	30,026
Chelan	8,226	51.38%	5,806	36.27%	1,977	12.35%	-2,420	-15.12%	16,009
Clallam	7,380	38.73%	9,121	47.87%	2,552	13.39%	1,741	9.14%	19,053
Clark	24,809	37.63%	30,667	46.51%	10,461	15.87%	5,858	8.88%	65,937
Columbia	568	53.58%	335	31.60%	157	14.81%	-233	-21.98%	1,060
Cowlitz	6,461	36.06%	9,207	51.39%	2,247	12.54%	2,746	15.33%	17,915
Douglas	3,763	53.16%	2,328	32.89%	987	13.94%	-1,435	-20.27%	7,078
Ferry	743	45.89%	635	39.22%	241	14.89%	-108	-6.67%	1,619
Franklin	4,617	51.99%	2,973	33.48%	1,290	14.53%	-1,644	-18.51%	8,880
Garfield	302	54.81%	170	30.85%	79	14.34%	-132	-23.96%	551
Grant	5,852	50.15%	3,832	32.84%	1,985	17.01%	-2,020	-17.31%	11,669
Grays Harbor	4,844	35.17%	7,595	55.14%	1,336	9.70%	2,751	19.97%	13,775
Island	9,300	41.51%	10,959	48.92%	2,145	9.57%	1,659	7.40%	22,404
Jefferson	3,332	29.38%	7,221	63.67%	788	6.95%	3,889	34.29%	11,341
King	133,783	32.93%	251,097	61.81%	21,334	5.25%	117,314	28.88%	406,214
Kitsap	21,727	37.72%	29,227	50.74%	6,643	11.53%	7,500	13.02%	57,597
Kittitas	3,795	47.35%	3,283	40.96%	937	11.69%	-512	-6.39%	8,015
Klickitat	1,620	41.54%	1,708	43.79%	572	14.67%	88	2.26%	3,900
Lewis	7,872	52.04%	5,278	34.89%	1,976	13.06%	-2,594	-17.15%	15,126
Lincoln	1,548	52.90%	883	30.18%	495	16.92%	-665	-22.73%	2,926
Mason	5,590	38.36%	7,297	50.07%	1,686	11.57%	1,707	11.71%	14,573
Okanogan	3,625	45.97%	3,241	41.10%	1,020	12.93%	-384	-4.87%	7,886
Pacific	2,137	36.37%	3,197	54.42%	541	9.21%	1,060	18.04%	5,875
Pend Oreille	1,435	43.20%	1,379	41.51%	508	15.29%	-56	-1.69%	3,322
Pierce	58,655	41.07%	69,662	48.77%	14,516	10.16%	11,007	7.71%	142,833
San Juan	1,455	27.68%	3,306	62.89%	496	9.44%	1,851	35.21%	5,257
Skagit	10,775	41.03%	12,878	49.04%	2,607	9.93%	2,103	8.01%	26,260
Skamania	829	38.08%	1,040	47.77%	308	14.15%	211	9.69%	2,177
Snohomish	51,592	38.35%	67,703	50.32%	15,238	11.33%	16,111	11.98%	134,533
Spokane	37,924	39.44%	43,074	44.80%	15,156	15.76%	5,150	5.36%	96,154
Stevens	4,920	47.57%	3,515	33.99%	1,907	18.44%	-1,405	-13.59%	10,342
Thurston	19,169	34.59%	31,413	56.68%	4,843	8.74%	12,244	22.09%	55,425
Wahkiakum	405	34.91%	590	50.86%	165	14.22%	185	15.95%	1,160
Walla Walla	6,018	50.02%	4,596	38.20%	1,418	11.79%	-1,422	-11.82%	12,032
Whatcom	15,596	36.07%	22,714	52.54%	4,924	11.39%	7,118	16.46%	43,234
Whitman	2,927	43.23%	2,950	43.57%	893	13.19%	23	0.34%	6,770
Yakima	14,492	48.12%	11,529	38.28%	4,097	13.60%	-2,963	-9.84%	30,118
Totals	506,524	38.20%	685,346	51.68%	134,185	10.12%	178,822	13.49%	1,326,055

Counties that flipped from Republican to Democratic

- Cowlitz (largest city: Longview)
- Grays Harbor (largest city: Aberdeen)
- King (largest city: Seattle)
- Kitsap (largest city: Bremerton)
- Mason (largest city: Shelton)
- Snohomish (largest city: Everett)
- Thurston (largest city: Lacey)
- Wahkiakum (largest city: Puget Island)
- Whatcom (largest city: Bellingham)

==== By congressional district ====
District	Dunn	Ferguson	Pidgeon	Representative
1st	42%	47%	11%	Suzan DelBene
2nd	36%	54%	10%	Rick Larsen
3rd	39%	46%	14%	Jaime Herrera Beutler
4th	50%	35%	15%	Doc Hastings
5th	42%	43%	15%	Cathy McMorris Rodgers
6th	37%	53%	10%	Norm Dicks
7th	22%	75%	3%	Jim McDermott
8th	49%	41%	10%	Dave Reichert
9th	36%	59%	6%	Adam Smith
10th	38%	52%	10%	Denny Heck

== General election ==
=== Polling ===
Graphical summary

View source data.

Poll source	Date(s) administered	Sample size	Margin of error	Reagan Dunn (R)	Bob Ferguson (D)	Undecided
Washington Poll	October 18–31, 2012	632 (LV)	± 3.9%	34%	45%	21%
Elway Research	October 18–21, 2012	451 (RV)	± 4.5%	36%	38%	25%
Elway Research	September 9–12, 2012	405 (RV)	± 5.0%	27%	40%	33%
SurveyUSA	September 7–9, 2012	524 (RV)	± 4.4%	33%	42%	24%
Elway Research	June 13–16, 2012	408 (RV)	± 5.0%	28%	26%	46%
Public Policy Polling (D)	February 22, 2012	1,264 (RV)	± 2.8%	34%	32%	34%
SurveyUSA	September 26, 2011	529 (RV)	± 4.3%	34%	39%	26%

=== Results ===
2012 Washington Attorney General election
Party	Candidate	Votes	%	±%
Democratic	Bob Ferguson	1,564,443	53.48	+12.94
Republican	Reagan Dunn	1,361,010	46.52	–12.94
Total votes		2,925,453	100.00	N/A
Democratic gain from Republican				

==== By county ====
County results
County	Reagan Dunn Republican		Bob Ferguson Democratic		Margin		Total votes
County	#	%	#	%	#	%	Total votes
Adams	3,130	69.37%	1,382	30.63%	-1,748	-38.74%	4,512
Asotin	5,433	58.32%	3,883	41.68%	-1,550	-16.64%	9,316
Benton	50,660	68.08%	23,756	31.92%	-26,904	-36.15%	74,416
Chelan	18,195	60.23%	12,014	39.77%	-6,181	-20.46%	30,209
Clallam	18,094	50.40%	17,810	49.60%	-284	-0.79%	35,904
Clark	94,162	53.42%	82,101	46.58%	-12,061	-6.84%	176,263
Columbia	1,496	71.14%	607	28.86%	-889	-42.27%	2,103
Cowlitz	20,499	49.33%	21,056	50.67%	557	1.34%	41,555
Douglas	9,111	64.33%	5,052	35.67%	-4,059	-28.66%	14,163
Ferry	1,972	61.28%	1,246	38.72%	-726	-22.56%	3,218
Franklin	14,216	65.44%	7,508	34.56%	-6,708	-30.88%	21,724
Garfield	804	68.37%	372	31.63%	-432	-36.73%	1,176
Grant	17,530	67.26%	8,534	32.74%	-8,996	-34.52%	26,064
Grays Harbor	12,203	44.67%	15,116	55.33%	2,913	10.66%	27,319
Island	19,992	50.51%	19,587	49.49%	-405	-1.02%	39,579
Jefferson	6,722	35.97%	11,968	64.03%	5,246	28.07%	18,690
King	312,409	34.83%	584,503	65.17%	272,094	30.34%	896,912
Kitsap	54,999	47.12%	61,733	52.88%	6,734	5.77%	116,732
Kittitas	10,071	59.93%	6,733	40.07%	-3,338	-19.86%	16,804
Klickitat	5,242	54.75%	4,333	45.25%	-909	-9.49%	9,575
Lewis	19,831	61.72%	12,301	38.28%	-7,530	-23.43%	32,132
Lincoln	3,915	70.57%	1,633	29.43%	-2,282	-41.13%	5,548
Mason	13,048	48.57%	13,817	51.43%	769	2.86%	26,865
Okanogan	9,119	57.54%	6,729	42.46%	-2,390	-15.08%	15,848
Pacific	4,537	45.72%	5,386	54.28%	849	8.56%	9,923
Pend Oreille	3,865	61.19%	2,451	38.81%	-1,414	-22.39%	6,316
Pierce	157,121	48.60%	166,160	51.40%	9,039	2.80%	323,281
San Juan	3,392	34.09%	6,559	65.91%	3,167	31.83%	9,951
Skagit	25,820	49.57%	26,264	50.43%	444	0.85%	52,084
Skamania	2,624	52.22%	2,401	47.78%	-223	-4.44%	5,025
Snohomish	142,285	45.72%	168,912	54.28%	26,627	8.56%	311,197
Spokane	118,707	56.60%	91,030	43.40%	-27,677	-13.20%	209,737
Stevens	13,856	65.72%	7,226	34.28%	-6,630	-31.45%	21,082
Thurston	52,151	43.87%	66,732	56.13%	14,581	12.27%	118,883
Wahkiakum	1,049	50.70%	1,020	49.30%	-29	-1.40%	2,069
Walla Walla	15,149	64.44%	8,358	35.56%	-6,791	-28.89%	23,507
Whatcom	43,606	45.20%	52,872	54.80%	9,266	9.60%	96,478
Whitman	8,701	55.45%	6,991	44.55%	-1,710	-10.90%	15,692
Yakima	45,294	61.54%	28,307	38.46%	-16,987	-23.08%	73,601
Totals	1,361,010	46.52%	1,564,443	53.48%	203,433	6.95%	2,925,453

Counties that flipped from Republican to Democratic

- Cowlitz (largest city: Longview)
- Grays Harbor (largest city: Aberdeen)
- King (largest city: Seattle)
- Kitsap (largest city: Bremerton)
- Mason (largest city: Shelton)
- Pacific (largest city: Raymond)
- Pierce (largest city: Tacoma)
- Skagit (largest city: Mount Vernon)
- Snohomish (largest city: Everett)
- Thurston (largest city: Lacey)
- Whatcom (largest city: Bellingham)

==== By congressional district ====
Ferguson won six of ten congressional districts.

District	Dunn	Ferguson	Representative
1st	49%	51%	Suzan DelBene
2nd	43%	57%	Rick Larsen
3rd	53%	47%	Jaime Herrera Beutler
4th	65%	35%	Doc Hastings
5th	58%	42%	Cathy McMorris Rodgers
6th	45%	55%	Norm Dicks
6th	45%	55%	Derek Kilmer
7th	23%	77%	Jim McDermott
8th	54%	46%	Dave Reichert
9th	36%	64%	Adam Smith
10th	46%	54%	Denny Heck
