= Bob Ferguson (politician) =

Governor of Washington since 2025

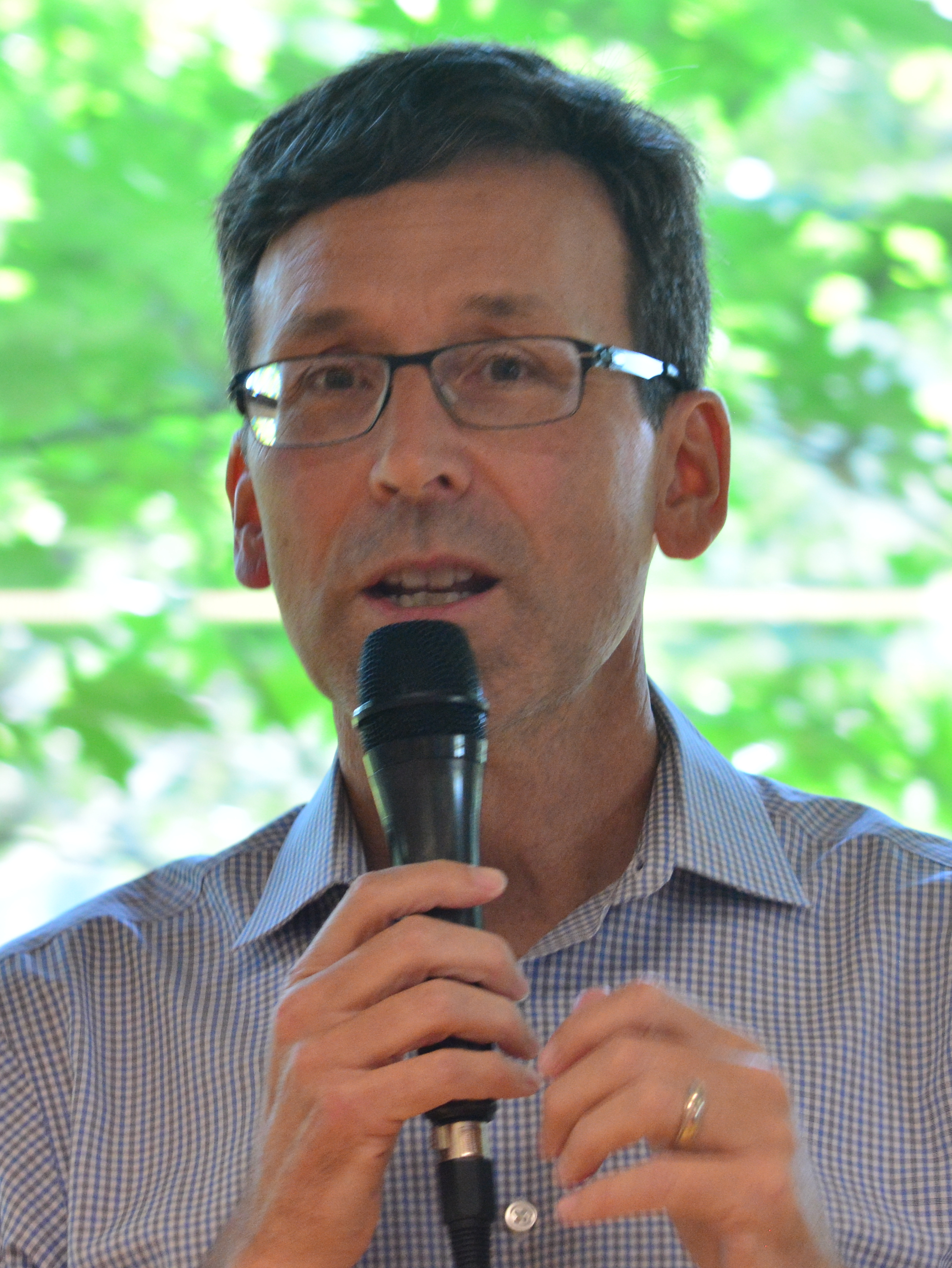
- Ferguson in 2023

24th Governor of Washington
- Incumbent
- Assumed office January 15, 2025
- Lieutenant: Denny Heck
- Preceded by: Jay Inslee

18th Attorney General of Washington
- In office January 16, 2013 – January 15, 2025
- Governor: Jay Inslee
- Preceded by: Rob McKenna
- Succeeded by: Nick Brown

Chair of the King County Council
- In office November 24, 2009 – January 16, 2013
- Preceded by: Dow Constantine
- Succeeded by: Larry Gossett

Member of the King County Council
- In office January 1, 2004 – January 16, 2013
- Preceded by: Cynthia Sullivan
- Succeeded by: Rod Dembowski
- Constituency: 2nd district (2004–2006); 1st district (2006–2013)

Personal details
- Born: Robert Watson Ferguson; February 23, 1965 (age 61) Seattle, Washington, U.S.
- Party: Democratic
- Spouse: Colleen Ferguson (m. 2004)
- Children: 2
- Education: University of Washington (BA); New York University (JD)
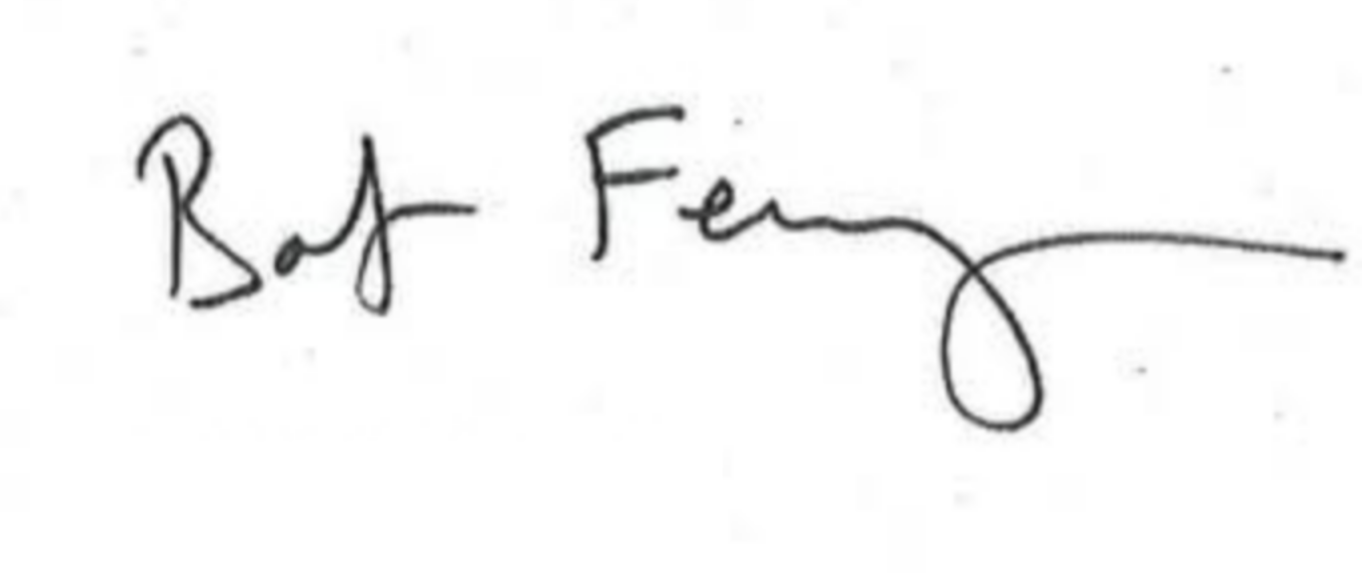
- Signature
- Website: Office website Campaign website
- Ferguson's voice Ferguson on crime and policing in Washington. Recorded August 13, 2024

Robert Watson Ferguson (born February 23, 1965) is an American attorney and politician serving since 2025 as the 24th governor of Washington. A member of the Democratic Party, he served from 2013 to 2025 as the 18th attorney general of Washington, and from 2004 to 2013 as a member of the King County Council.

Ferguson was first elected attorney general in 2012 and was re-elected in 2016 and 2020. He was elected governor in 2024.

== Early life and education ==
Ferguson was born in Seattle in 1965, the son of Murray and Betty (Hausmann) Ferguson. He is a fourth-generation Washingtonian, whose great-grandparents homesteaded on the Skagit River in the 19th century, near what is now Marblemount.

Ferguson graduated from Bishop Blanchet High School in 1983 and attended the University of Washington, where he was elected student body president. After college, Ferguson joined Jesuit Volunteer Corps Northwest and directed an emergency services office for a year.

Ferguson earned a Juris Doctor from the New York University School of Law. While there, he received a grant to provide legal assistance to the Yaqui tribe in Guadalupe, Arizona. Ferguson lived in Guadalupe for a time, assisting community members on legal matters.

== Early career ==
After graduating from law school, Ferguson began his legal career in Spokane, where he clerked for Chief Judge William Fremming Nielsen of the United States District Court for the Eastern District of Washington, who was appointed by George H. W. Bush. He then clerked for Judge Myron H. Bright of the United States Court of Appeals for the Eighth Circuit, who was appointed by Lyndon B. Johnson.

After his clerkship, Ferguson returned to Seattle and joined Preston Gates & Ellis (now K&L Gates) as a litigator, representing individuals, businesses, local governments, and Washington corporations. Ferguson worked with the legal team that defended taxpayers from paying for cost overruns associated with Safeco Field construction. He was also part of the legal team that challenged the constitutionality of initiatives proposed by Tim Eyman, an anti-tax activist.

Ferguson worked on cases involving software piracy and sued companies that stole intellectual property from Washington companies. He also donated hundreds of hours of free legal advice to nonprofit organizations. For example, he assisted Kruckeberg Botanic Garden Foundation as legal counsel to turn a six-acre garden into a public park in Shoreline.

After four years at Preston Gates & Ellis, Ferguson decided to run for the King County Council.

== King County Council (2004–2013) ==
=== Elections ===
Ferguson was elected to the King County Council in 2003, defeating Cynthia Sullivan, a 20-year veteran of the council, by about 500 votes. At the time, the council was elected on a partisan basis. Ferguson faced no general election opponent in the heavily Democratic district. During his campaign to unseat Sullivan, Ferguson knocked on 22,000 doors in the district.

As a result of the council reduction, redistricting placed Ferguson in the same district as another Democratic county councilmember, Carolyn Edmonds of Shoreline. Ferguson narrowly defeated Edmonds and went on to defeat Republican challenger Steven Pyeatt in the general election with about 74% of the vote.

=== Tenure ===
Ferguson represented Council District 1, which includes northeast Seattle, Shoreline, Lake Forest Park, Kenmore, Bothell, Kirkland, and part of Woodinville. During his time on the Council, he chaired the Regional Policy and Law, Justice and Human Services Committees and twice chaired the Law and Justice Committee. In 2005, he co-sponsored legislation to place a ballot measure before King County voters to generate revenue to improve health services for veterans and military personnel. Voters approved the measure and renewed it in 2011.

When King County Executive's office proposed spending $6.8 million for new furniture for the new county office building, Ferguson pushed the county to buy used furniture instead, saving taxpayers more than $1 million.

Ferguson led the effort to raise $50 million annually to assist those suffering from mental illness and drug addiction. He received the Booth Gardner Mental Health Champion award from Sound Mental Health in 2011. Ferguson successfully fought for $5 million to fund public health clinics in Northgate and Bothell that were threatened with closure.

Ferguson served on the Youth Justice Coordinating Council on Gangs. He pushed for civilian oversight of the King County Sheriff's office. In 2006, he helped lead the effort to create permanent oversight in the King County Sheriff's office.

He sponsored the Open Space Preservation Act, which protects 100,000 acres of open space. Ferguson authored legislation that prevents King County from doing business with companies known to repeatedly violate wage theft laws.

In 2007, Ferguson co-sponsored legislation increasing the sales tax by 0.1% to expand mental health, drug addiction and therapeutic court programs to reduce costly and unnecessary involvement in the criminal justice system by the mentally ill and drug addicts, and to save lives. The council approved the measure in a bipartisan vote. In 2009, Ferguson co-sponsored bipartisan legislation that called on the executive to streamline the county's procurement process. He and Kathy Lambert co-sponsored legislation that eliminated 15 pages of paper forms required to contract with King County (Ordinance 2010-0186).

Ferguson also worked to reform county government by connecting workers' wages to the economy, leading the Seattle Times to write, "This is brand new, necessary stuff in a county that can ill afford the existing approach. These changes would not be possible without the hard work of Republican Kathy Lambert and Council Chairman Bob Ferguson…Ferguson is taking considerable heat from labor for sticking his neck out on policies that may be anathema to his constituents. Ferguson's work should inspire other Democrats on the council to join him in moving the county forward to the 21st century."

Ferguson co-sponsored legislation promoting the use of small businesses in fulfilling county contracts. (Ordinance 2007-0146). In 2011, he co-sponsored legislation creating a "Small Business Accelerator" program. He declined to take a pay raise during tough economic times. Ferguson also helped lead the effort for an independent audit of the county's election office.

In 2010, Ferguson sponsored a ballot measure that would increase the sales tax to provide additional revenues to King County. Proposition No. 1 Sales and Use Tax. The measure failed, 54.9% to 45.1%. He wrote the law that reformed the county's public records process to ensure that citizens can easily obtain records and monitor their government.

Ferguson received the Landmark Deeds Award for Public Service by the Washington Trust for Historic Preservation.

The Center for Human Services selected Ferguson as the 2008 recipient of its annual Dorrit Pealy Award for Outstanding Community Service. Food Lifeline gave him a Special Appreciation Award at its annual Ending Hunger Awards luncheon. In 2010, Ferguson was selected to join the Aspen Institute-Rodel Fellowship, a program that brings together the nation's most promising political leaders.

== Attorney general of Washington (2013–2025) ==
=== Elections ===
In 2012, Ferguson was elected the 18th attorney general of Washington State, defeating fellow King County Council member Reagan Dunn with 53.5% of the vote to Dunn's 46.5%. He won even though an out-of-state group spent an unprecedented amount to support Dunn. During the campaign, Ferguson visited all 39 Washington state counties.

In 2016, Ferguson faced only Joshua Trumbull, a Libertarian with no political experience. Ferguson spent little of the money he had raised for the campaign and was reelected, 67% to 33%. He garnered the most votes of any state candidate and carried 37 of the state's 39 counties.

In 2020, Ferguson faced Matt Larkin, a political newcomer and strong Trump supporter, who said that Ferguson was too soft on crime and criticized his legal challenges of the Trump administration. Ferguson was reelected, 56% to 43%.

=== Tenure ===
During Donald Trump's first presidential term, the Office of the Attorney General sued the federal government 99 times, with Ferguson leading 36 of the cases, winning 47 times and losing twice.

==== Arlene's Flowers lawsuit ====
In April 2013 Ferguson filed a consumer protection lawsuit against Barronelle Stutzman and her Richland floral shop Arlene's Flowers even without a complaint by Robert Ingersoll and his fiance Curt Freed. Ferguson claimed the business violated Washington's consumer protection law after Stutzman refused to provide flowers for the couple's same-sex wedding. The attorney general's office sent Stutzman a letter informing her she was in violation of Washington State's Consumer Protection Act. A letter by Ferguson called for a penalty of $2,000 and to celebrate all same-sex unions. Stutzman replied that it was against her religious beliefs to do so. The attorney general's office followed up with a phone call to Stutzman, giving her an opportunity to comply with the law, head off legal action, and avoid paying fees or costs. Stutzman responded with a letter from her lawyer. Stutzman's lawyer said Ferguson did not have the statutory authority to file the lawsuit and that it was uncertain whether it was a "clear case of discrimination". The engaged couple's attorneys at the American Civil Liberties Union then sued the florist for damages.

The couple had been clients of Stutzman for nine years before they requested her services for their wedding, which she refused to do based upon her religious view of same-sex marriage. Stutzman filed a counter-suit, stating that Ferguson's lawsuit was an attempt to force her to violate her religious beliefs. Stutzman and her attorneys at the Alliance Defending Freedom requested that the lawsuit be dismissed, alleging that the suit failed to show that the couple had suffered any financial injury to their business or property. Judge Sal Mendoza Jr. ruled that the lawsuit could continue, as the time and cost of traveling to Arlene's Flowers and finding another florist counted as financial injury.

On February 18, 2015, Benton County Superior Court Judge Alexander Ekstrom ruled that Stutzman had violated the state's anti-discrimination law. On February 19, 2015, Stutzman said she would appeal the ruling. On March 27, 2015, Ekstrom fined Stutzman $1,000 plus $1 for court costs and fees.

On November 15, 2016, Ferguson personally argued at the Washington Supreme Court hearing, which was held before an audience in Bellevue College's auditorium. On February 16, 2017, the Washington Supreme Court ruled unanimously against Stutzman. In the court's opinion, Justice Sheryl Gordon McCloud wrote that neither the U.S. Constitution's Free Exercise Clause nor its Free Speech Clause gave Stutzman the right to refuse to participate in the wedding. On June 25, 2018, the Supreme Court of the United States vacated this decision and sent it back for rehearing in light of the Masterpiece Cakeshop v. Colorado Civil Rights Commission decision. On June 6, 2019, the Washington Supreme Court unanimously ruled against Stutzman again, finding no evidence of religious animus.

==== Comcast lawsuit ====
On August 1, 2016, Ferguson announced that Washington state would sue telecommunications company Comcast over deceptive consumer practices. The $100 million consumer protection lawsuit was filed over 1.8 million individual violations of the state's Consumer Protection Act. The court's ruling resulted in $9.1 million in civil penalties against Comcast and required restitution to customers, but the court rejected some of the complaint's allegations about repair fees.

==== Executive Order 13769 ====
On January 27, 2017, President Donald Trump signed Executive Order 13769, which effectively banned non-citizens and refugees from seven Middle Eastern countries from entering the U.S. for 90 days. On January 30, Ferguson and Governor Jay Inslee announced that the State would file a legal challenge against Trump, as well as relevant administrative secretaries, to overturn the order, arguing that it was a case of religious discrimination.

Ferguson filed suit within 72 hours, with statements of support from Washington-based companies, including Amazon and Microsoft. On February 3, U.S. District Judge James L. Robart of the United States District Court for the Western District of Washington ruled in Ferguson's favor for a temporary restraining order on the enforcement of the travel ban nationwide.

==== Gun control ====
Ferguson suggested a bill banning assault weapons to State Representative Strom Peterson, which passed the House in March 2023.

Ferguson's "large capacity" magazine ban was challenged by a lawsuit placed by the Firearms Policy Coalition, the Second Amendment Foundation, and three other parties.

Ferguson settled with a local gun shop for $3 million after the owner continued to sell high-capacity ammunition magazines.

==== Withholding of evidence ====
Under Ferguson's watch, Washington State withheld evidence in a case involving a developmentally disabled woman who the state placed in a care home. Judge Michael Ryan found that Ferguson's office had "a reckless approach" to discovery and lacked "adequate procedures [...] to ensure that its discovery obligations are being met".

==== Value Village lawsuit ====
As state attorney general, Ferguson lost a long-running case with Savers Value Village. The case started in 2015 and reached the Washington State Supreme Court in 2023, where the judges unanimously found that Value Village had not defrauded consumers by representing itself as a charity, as Ferguson had claimed. The state spent more than $4.2 million in legal fees.

==== Drug decriminalization ====
In 2021, the attorney general’s office released a statement expressing Ferguson’s support for drug decriminalization. In an interview published the same day as the press release, Ferguson expanded on his position.

==== Tribal salmon case ====
In 2001, a group of Native American tribes in Washington State sued the state to install and maintain culverts to aid spawning salmon. Lower courts found for the tribes, but Ferguson appealed the case to the U.S. Supreme Court. The Supreme Court reached a 4-4 split decision, allowing the lower court's finding for the tribes stand. A win would have saved the state more than $2 billion in costs to replace existing culverts. Some estimates put the cost of complying with the court order in excess of $7.3 billion.

==== Chicken and tuna price-fixing ====
In 2021, Ferguson sued multiple companies, alleging price-fixing conspiracies by chicken producers and major tuna companies. The cases against the tuna companies resulted in $4.7 million resolutions and $450,000 in sanctions. As of December 2023, resolutions of cases against chicken producers resulted in recovery of $35.5 million.

==== Healthcare-related issues ====
A lawsuit filed by Ferguson against Providence Health & Services for violating the state's charity care law resulted in a 2024 settlement in which the health care system refunded nearly $21 million in medical bills and erased $137 million of medical debt.

Four years after Ferguson sued Johnson & Johnson for its contributions to opioid addiction, a $149.5 million settlement was reached in 2024.

==== Lawsuits to block ballot initiatives ====
In 2024, Ferguson filed lawsuits aimed at blocking voter initiatives from the ballot without informing parties involved in the initiatives.

== Governor of Washington (2025–present) ==
=== Elections ===
==== 2024 Washington gubernatorial campaign ====
Ferguson announced his candidacy for governor in September 2023. His management of more than $1 million in surplus campaign contributions drew scrutiny and criticism. In May 2024, State Senator Mark Mullet filed an ethics complaint against Ferguson claiming that Ferguson used his office to influence a decision on candidate ballot ordering in the secretary of state's office.

Ferguson made abortion central to his campaign, including criticizing one of his opponents on that issue with a misleading television advertisement. During the campaign, Ferguson was criticized for supporting drug decriminalization in 2021. Ferguson’s campaign benefited from a massive advantage in Super PAC spending against Republican nominee Dave Reichert. In November 2024, Ferguson won the general election by 11 points.

==== 2028 Washington gubernatorial campaign ====
On January 13, 2025, Ferguson filed paperwork declaring his candidacy in the 2028 Washington gubernatorial election. As of mid‑2025, other candidates include Republican Ethan Brunton and Constitution Party candidate Ambra Mason, who was a write-in candidate in the 2024 gubernatorial race.

=== Tenure ===
Ferguson was sworn in as governor on January 15, 2025. He signed three executive orders on his first day in office: directing a review of regulations that affect housing, addressing reproductive freedom, and permitting reform.

In May 2025, Ferguson signed a $9 billion package of tax increases, acknowledging that the increases contradicted statements he had previously made against tax hikes. In July, a Cascade PBS/Elway poll found that Ferguson had the lowest six-month gubernatorial job rating since Mike Lowry 30 years earlier. Only 32% of voters said he was doing a good or great job, with another 22% rating Ferguson fair and 31% saying he was doing a poor job.

== Personal life ==
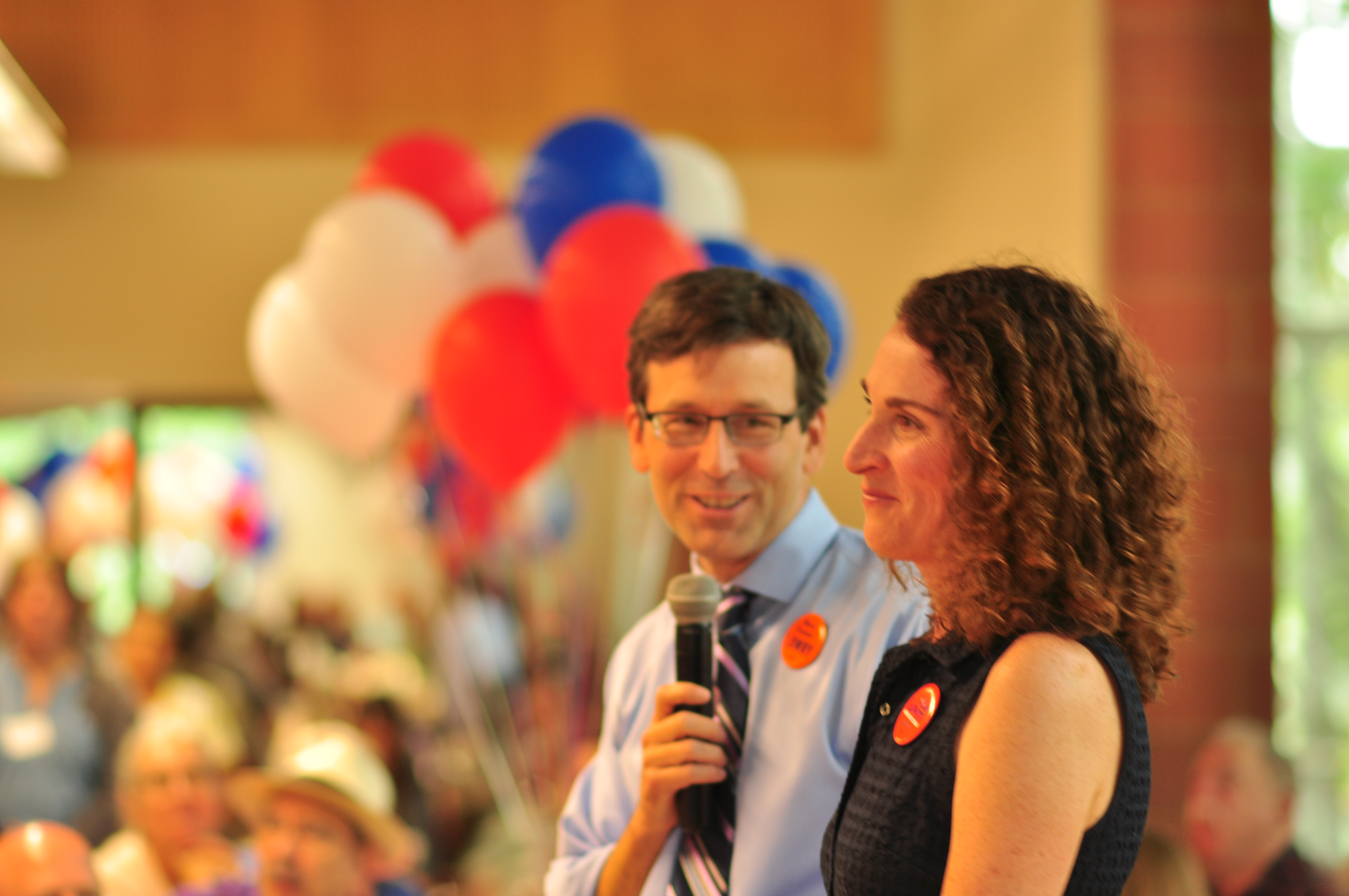
Ferguson and his wife Colleen

Ferguson is an enthusiastic mountain climber, backpacker, and birder, and has hiked hundreds of miles of Washington trails and climbed many of the state's highest peaks. After college, he traveled around the country to see a baseball game in every major league stadium. Ferguson is a chess master. His games have appeared in local, national, and international chess publications, and he has twice won the Washington State Chess Championship. As of 2026, he has a 2232 FIDE rating. Ferguson and his wife, Colleen, live in the Washington Governor's Mansion in Olympia with their two children. Ferguson is Catholic.

In 2017, Ferguson was included on the annual Time 100 list of the most influential people in the world.

== Electoral history ==
Washington State Attorney General election results, 2012–2020
Election	Candidate	Party	Votes	Pct	Candidate	Party	Votes	Pct	Candidate	Party	Votes	Pct
2012 Primary	Bob Ferguson	Democratic	685,346	51.68%	Reagan Dunn	Republican	506,524	38.20%	Stephen Pidgeon	Republican	134,185	10.12%
2012 General	Bob Ferguson	Democratic	1,564,443	53.48%	Reagan Dunn	Republican	1,361,010	46.52%				
2016 Primary	Bob Ferguson	Democratic	906,493	72.61%	Joshua B. Trumbull	Libertarian	341,932	27.39%				
2016 General	Bob Ferguson	Democratic	2,000,804	67.14%	Joshua B. Trumbull	Libertarian	979,105	32.86%				
2020 General	Bob Ferguson	Democratic	2,226,418	56.43%	Matt Larkin	Republican	1,714,927	43.47%				

Washington State Governor election results, 2024–present
Election	Candidate	Party	Votes	Pct	Candidate	Party	Votes	Pct	Candidate	Party	Votes	Pct
2024 Primary	Bob Ferguson	Democratic	884,268	44.88%	Dave Reichert	Republican	541,533	27.48%	Semi Bird	Republican	212,692	10.79%
2024 General	Bob Ferguson	Democratic	2,143,368	55.51%	Dave Reichert	Republican	1,709,818	44.28%				

Legal offices
Preceded by Rob McKenna	Attorney General of Washington; 2013–2025	Succeeded by Nick Brown
Party political offices
Preceded by Jay Inslee	Democratic nominee for Governor of Washington; 2024	Most recent
Political offices
Preceded by Jay Inslee	Governor of Washington; 2025–present	Incumbent
U.S. order of precedence (ceremonial)
Preceded by JD Vance as Vice President	Order of precedence of the United States; Within Washington	Succeeded by Mayor of city in which event is held
Preceded by JD Vance as Vice President	Order of precedence of the United States; Within Washington	Succeeded by Otherwise Mike Johnson as Speaker of the House
Preceded by Greg Gianforte as Governor of Montana	Order of precedence of the United States; Outside Washington	Succeeded by Brad Little as Governor of Idaho
