= 2025 King County Executive election =

Washington state local election

- November 4, 2025
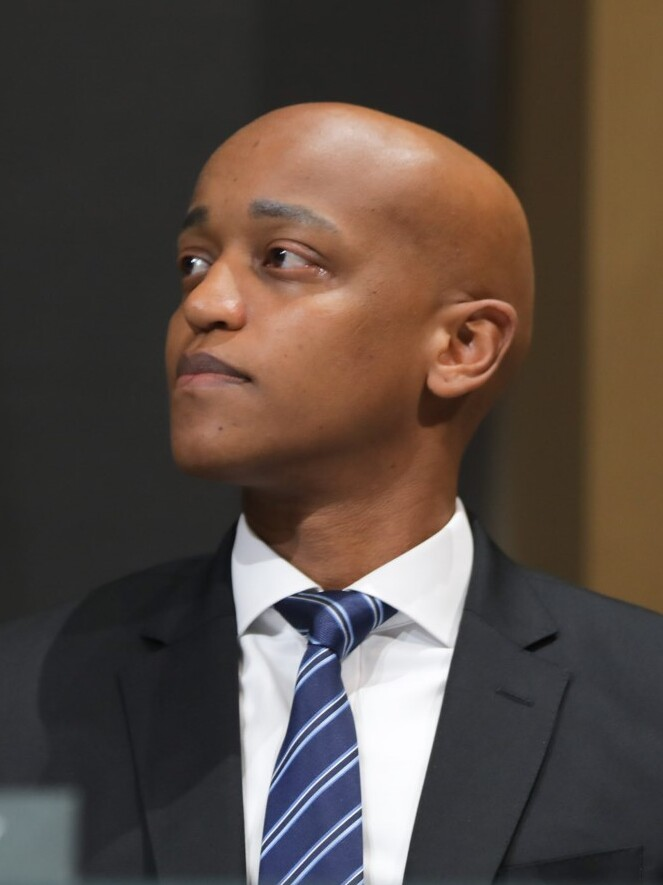

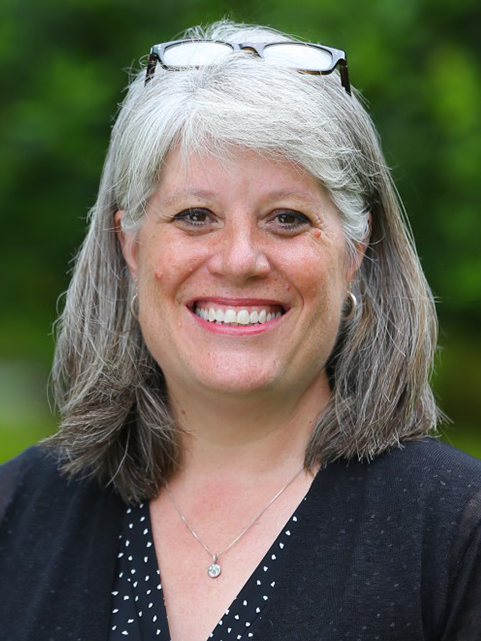
Candidate	Girmay Zahilay	Claudia Balducci
Party	Nonpartisan	Nonpartisan
Popular vote	321,749	267,419
Percentage	54.02%	44.90%
- Precinct results Zahilay: 40–50% 50–60% 60–70% 70–80% 80–90% Balducci: 40–50% 50–60% 60–70% 70–80% 80–90% 90–100%
County Executive before election
Shannon Braddock (interim)
Nonpartisan
Elected County Executive
Girmay Zahilay
Nonpartisan

The 2025 King County Executive election was held in King County, Washington during the 2025 United States general election. Former County Executive Dow Constantine announced in November 2024 that he would not seek re-election. He was then replaced by interim County Executive Shannon Braddock upon his appointment as CEO of Sound Transit. On November 7, The Seattle Times projected King County Councilmember Girmay Zahilay to win the election, making him the youngest person to ever hold the position.

== Background ==
The election will be held in 2025, and will be the last King County Executive election to be held in an odd-numbered year. In 2022, a King County charter amendment was passed that moved elections of several offices, including county executive, to even-numbered years. This means that starting after this election, the Executive will be elected in even-numbered years, starting in 2028. Therefore, this election will be to serve out a three year term instead of the normal four year term.

Incumbent Dow Constantine was first elected in 2009 and had served four terms since. He announced on November 12, 2024 that he would not seek re-election. The Sound Transit board of directors, of which Constantine was a member, announced his appointment as Chief Executive Officer in March 2025. He was replaced as County Executive by Deputy Executive Shannon Braddock until the seat could be filled in the regularly scheduled November 2025 General Election.

== Candidates ==
=== Declared ===
- Claudia Balducci, chair of the King County Council (2020–present) from the 6th district (2016–present)
- Derek Chartrand
- Bill Hirt, perennial candidate
- Amiya Ingram, Microsoft AI policy strategist
- Don Rivers, perennial candidate
- Rebecca Williamson, candidate for Seattle City Council in 2021 and 2023
- Girmay Zahilay, King County Councilmember from the 2nd district (2020–present)

=== Withdrawn ===
- John Arthur Wilson, King County Assessor (remained on ballot)

=== Declined ===
- Joe Nguyen, former state senator from the 34th district (2019–2025) and runner-up for county executive in 2021 (appointed as director of the Washington State Department of Commerce)

== Endorsements ==
Claudia Balducci

U.S. Representatives

- Marilyn Strickland, U.S. Representative from Washington's 10th congressional district (2021–present)

Statewide officials

- Patty Kuderer, Insurance Commissioner of Washington (2025–present)
- Pat McCarthy, Washington State Auditor (2017–present)

Democratic Party organizations

- King County Democrats (co-endorsement with Zahilay)
- Washington's 30th legislative district Democrats (co-endorsement with Zahilay)
- Washington's 32nd legislative district Democrats (co-endorsement with Zahilay)
- Washington's 34th legislative district Democrats (co-endorsement with Zahilay)
- Washington's 47th legislative district Democrats (co-endorsement)
- Washington's 48th legislative district Democrats

Organizations

- National Women's Political Caucus of Washington

Newspapers

- The Seattle Times
Girmay Zahilay

Statewide officials

- Nick Brown, Attorney General of Washington (2025–present)
- Bob Ferguson, Governor of Washington (2025–present)

U.S. Representatives

- Pramila Jayapal, U.S. Representative from Washington's 7th congressional district (2017–present)
- Adam Smith, U.S. Representative from Washington's 9th congressional district (1997–present)

Democratic Party organizations

- King County Democrats (co-endorsement with Balducci)
- Washington's 30th legislative district Democrats (co-endorsement with Balducci)
- Washington's 32nd legislative district Democrats (co-endorsement with Balducci)
- Washington's 33rd legislative district Democrats
- Washington's 34th legislative district Democrats (co-endorsement with Balducci)
- Washington's 36th legislative district Democrats
- Washington's 37th legislative district Democrats
- Washington's 43rd legislative district Democrats
- Washington's 46th legislative district Democrats
- Washington's 47th legislative district Democrats (co-endorsement with Balducci)

Labor unions

- American Federation of Teachers Washington
- Service Employees International Union 775
- United Auto Workers Local 4121

Organizations

- Planned Parenthood Action Fund

Newspapers

- The Daily of the University of Washington
- The Stranger

== Forums ==
2025 King County Executive election candidate forums
No.	Date	Host	Moderators	Link	Nonpartisan	Nonpartisan	Nonpartisan	Nonpartisan	Nonpartisan	Nonpartisan
Key: P Participant A Absent N Not invited I Invited W Withdrawn										
Key: P Participant A Absent N Not invited I Invited W Withdrawn					Claudia Balducci	Amiya Ingram	Don Rivers	Rebecca Williamson	John Arthur Wilson	Girmay Zahilay
1	May 14, 2025	Issaquah Alps Trails Club	Sally Jewell	YouTube	P	N	N	N	P	P
2	May 23, 2025	King County Young Democrats; Northwest Progressive Institute	Austin Kristofferson; Rohana Joshi	YouTube	P	P	P	P	P	P

== Primary ==
Although Constantine announced his intention not to seek re-election in 2024, it was not until 2025 when the public learned that he was a leading candidate in Sound Transit's CEO search. As King County Executive, Constantine was a member of the board and appointed board members over the course of many years, including two current ST board members who announced a run for King County Executive: Claudia Balducci and Girmay Zahilay.

John Arthur Wilson, the King County Assessor since winning office in 2015, was one of the first to declare candidacy, doing so just days after Constantine's announcement. Before becoming Assessor, he worked as a journalist and as chief of staff for former King County Executive Ron Sims. The Seattle Times reported in January 2025 that Wilson had a temporary protection order placed against him in May 2024 by his then partner, Lee Keller, who accused him of stalking. However, in the same article, Keller said that she had reconciled with Wilson, writing "We are happily engaged to be married, and we are planning a wedding."

On May 29, 2025, PubliCola reported that Keller had filed for a new temporary restraining order against him, after he continued harassing and stalking her after she "permanently and clearly ended" the relationship on April 15, 2025. Many local elected officials immediately called on Wilson to resign, including: Seattle mayor Bruce Harrell, interim King County Executive Shannon Braddock, King County Councilmembers Girmay Zahilay and Claudia Balducci, and state senator Manka Dhingra. The King County Council unanimously passed a vote of no confidence in Wilson and called for him to resign. Wilson refused to resign or drop out of the Executive race. In a motion to dismiss the restraining order, Wilson claimed that he was the victim of abuse by Keller, writing "Unfortunately, as much as I love Lee, her volatility and instability has become a real issue for me both personally and professionally."

On July 2, 2025, Wilson was arrested for stalking and violating the court ordered protection order placed on him. He was released on bail the next day.

=== Polling ===
Poll source	Date(s) administered	Sample size (Note: Key: A – all adults RV – registered voters LV – likely voters V – unclear)	Margin of error	Claudia Balducci	Girmay Zahilay	John Wilson	Other	Undecided
Fulcrum Strategic (Note: Poll sponsored by Balducci's campaign)	June 11–15, 2025	500 (LV)	± 4.4%	25%	21%	7%	48%	

=== Results ===
2025 King County Executive primary election
Party	Candidate	Votes	%
Nonpartisan	Girmay Zahilay	202,007	44.04%
Nonpartisan	Claudia Balducci	136,479	29.76%
Nonpartisan	Derek Chartrand	52,626	11.47%
Nonpartisan	John Arthur Wilson (withdrawn)	37,109	8.09%
Nonpartisan	Rebecca Williamson	9,459	2.06%
Nonpartisan	Amiya Ingram	8,353	1.82%
Nonpartisan	Bill Hirt	7,209	1.57%
Nonpartisan	Don Rivers	4,205	0.92%
Write-in		1,224	0.27%
Total votes		458,671	100.00%

== General election ==
=== Polling ===
Poll source	Date(s) administered	Sample size	Margin of error	Claudia Balducci	Girmay Zahilay	Undecided
Emerson College (D) (Note: Poll sponsored by the Northwest Progressive Institute, a liberal think tank)	October 22–27, 2025	600 (LV)	± 4.0%	29%	30%	41%
Emerson College (D)	October 22–27, 2025	600 (LV)	± 4.0%	35% (Note: With voters who lean towards a given candidate)	33%	28%
Fulcrum Strategic	June 11–15, 2025	500 (LV)	± 4.4%	22%	20%	57%

=== Debate ===
2025 King County Executive election candidate general election debate
No.	Date	Host	Moderators	Link	Nonpartisan	Nonpartisan
Key: P Participant A Absent N Not invited I Invited W Withdrawn						
Key: P Participant A Absent N Not invited I Invited W Withdrawn					Claudia Balducci	Girmay Zahilay
1	Oct. 2, 2025	KUOW-FM	Libby Denkmann	YouTube	P	P
2	Oct. 3, 2025	KCPQ; Seattle CityClub	John Hopperstad; Angela Poe Russell	YouTube	P	P

=== Results ===
General election turnout map by precinct 0–10% 10–20% 20–30% 30–40% 40–50% 50–60% 60–70% 70–80%

2025 King County Executive general election
Party	Candidate	Votes	%
Nonpartisan	Girmay Zahilay	321,749	54.02%
Nonpartisan	Claudia Balducci	267,419	44.90%
Write-in		6,470	1.09%
Total votes		595,638	100.00%

== Notes ==
Partisan clients
