= Claudia Balducci =

American politician

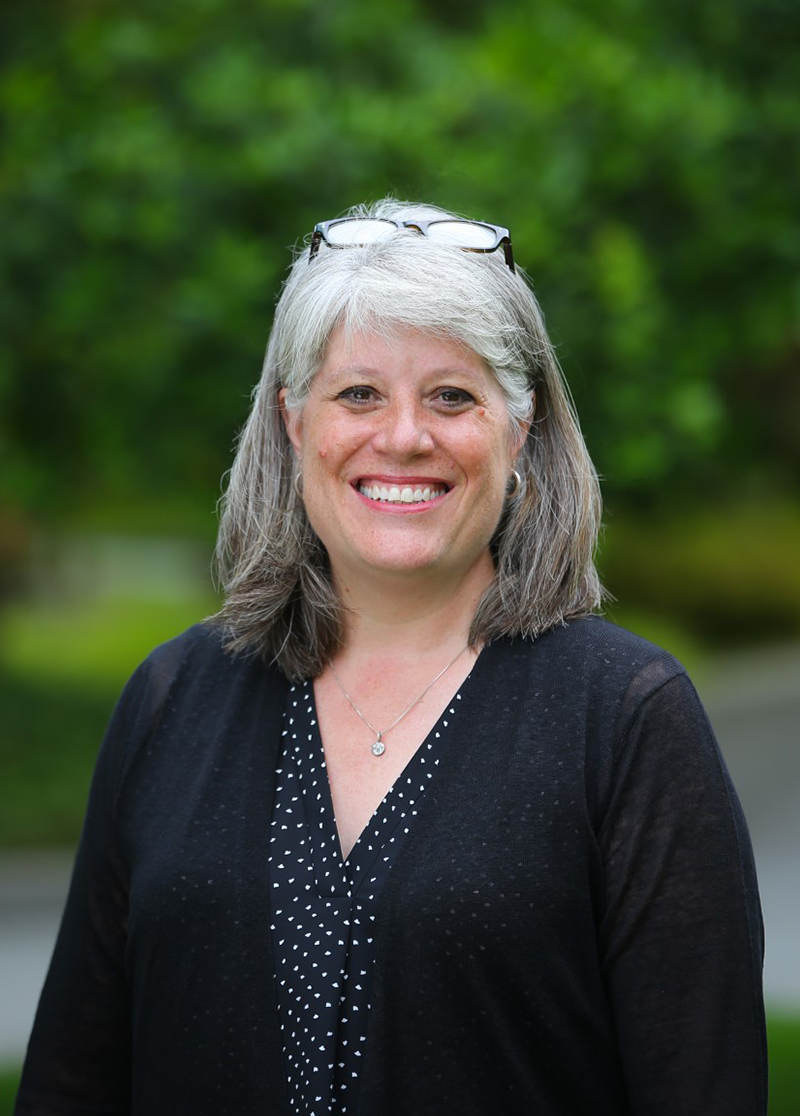

Member of the King County Council from the 6th district
- Incumbent
- Assumed office January 1, 2016
- Preceded by: Jane Hague

Chair of the King County Council
- In office January 8, 2020 – December 13, 2022
- Preceded by: Rod Dembowski
- Succeeded by: Dave Upthegrove

Mayor of Bellevue
- In office January 7, 2014 – January 1, 2016
- Preceded by: Conrad Lee
- Succeeded by: John Stokes

Member of the Bellevue City Council
- In office January 1, 2004 – January 1, 2016
- Succeeded by: Vandana Slatter

Personal details
- Born: September 24, 1967 (age 59) Mercer Island, Washington
- Party: Democratic
- Spouse: Jim Balducci
- Education: Providence College (BA); Columbia University (JD)
- Website: County Council website

Claudia M. Balducci (born September 24, 1967) is an American attorney and politician from Washington. She is a member of the King County Council for the 6th district and previously served Chair of the council. Prior to her election to the King County Council, she served as a councilmember for Bellevue, Washington from 2004-2016 and as Mayor of Bellevue from 2014-2016.

== Education ==
Balducci earned a Bachelor of Arts from Providence College and a Juris Doctor from Columbia Law School.

== Career ==
After graduating from law school, Balducci worked as a labor negotiator in Lake Hills, Bellevue. She has also worked as a leader in the areas of affordable housing, education, and transportation. Balducci was first elected to the Bellevue City Council in 2004. She served as deputy mayor of Bellevue from 2008 to 2009, and while working as the Director of the Department of Adult and Juvenile Detention for King County, was elected mayor of Bellevue in 2014. She was appointed to the Sound Transit board in 2010. During her tenure as mayor, Bellevue was selected to participate in a Bloomberg Philanthropies initiative to use data to enhance the distribution of public services. While serving as mayor, Balducci announced her candidacy for King County Council.

After endorsements that included U.S. Senators Patty Murray and Maria Cantwell, Governor Jay Inslee, and King County Executive Dow Constantine, Balducci defeated six-term incumbent Jane Hague in the 2015 election to the King County Council. After her re-election to a second term on the county council, she was unanimously elected to serve as Chair of the council in 2020. She is the first woman to serve as council chair since 2008.

During her tenure as Chair of the King County Council, she has addressed the local deployment of COVID-19 vaccines, homelessness and housing issues, and law enforcement reform. In 2020, she proposed the director of the Office of Law Enforcement Oversight (OLEO) not be reappointed, which was successful after a council vote. In 2021, she sponsored a proposal to create a "first-in-the-nation" program to support undocumented immigrants with applications for status and citizenship that was approved by the King County Council.

In 2021, in addition to her role as Chair of the King County Council, she was elected president of the Puget Sound Regional Council, after previously serving as vice-president, and she has served as Chair of the Sound Transit System Expansion Committee.

In 2025, Balducci ran to be the first woman elected as King County Executive. She advanced past the primary, but lost the race to fellow councilmember Girmay Zahilay in the general election.

== Honors and awards ==
- 2015 Warren G. Magnuson Elected Official of the Year Award, Washington State Democratic Party

== Personal life ==
In 2009, Balducci and her husband adopted a child from Kazakhstan.

== See also ==
- King County Council
- 2025 King County Executive election
