= Conrad Lee =

American engineer, politician from Washington

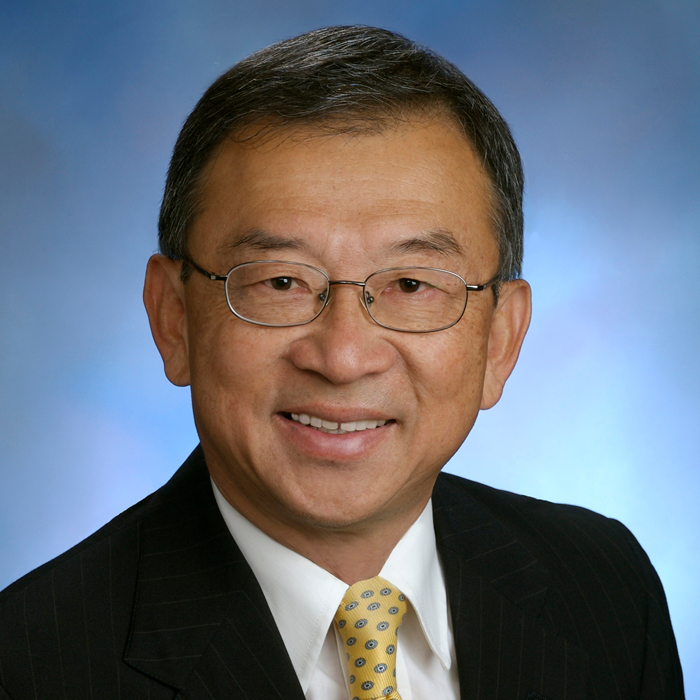

Mayor of Bellevue, Washington
- In office January 1, 2012 – January 7, 2014
- Preceded by: Don Davidson
- Succeeded by: Claudia Balducci

Personal details
- Born: February 10, 1939 (age 87) Kunming, China
- Party: Republican
- Spouse: Winnie
- Children: 2
- Education: Seattle Pacific University, University of Michigan, University of Washington
- Occupation: Engineer, Politician, stockbroker
- Website: www.conradlee.org

Conrad Lee (born February 10, 1939) is a Chinese-born American politician and engineer. He was the past mayor of Bellevue, Washington (2012–2014), and served on the city council from 1994 until 2025.

== Early life and education ==
Conrad Lee was born on February 10, 1939, in Kunming, China. His father was an aide to warlord Long Yun. After the death of his father, Lee moved to Hong Kong with his mother.

In 1958, he moved to the United States to attend college at Seattle Pacific University. He received his bachelor's degree in engineering from the University of Michigan, and an MBA degree from the University of Washington.

He become an engineer for Boeing in 1967. He has also worked as a stockbroker.

== Political career and controversies ==
Lee was first elected to the Bellevue city council in 1994. He served as deputy mayor in 2010 and 2011 before being elected mayor in 2012. During his tenure on the city council, he had compromised on a policy that planned to increase property tax to fund the Sound Transit's planned light-rail route through South Bellevue. He was the first Asian American mayor of Bellevue.

Lee won re-election in 2013 with 78% of the vote.

Lee won re-election in 2017 with 69% of the vote and $158,311 raised.

Lee won re-election in 2021 with less than 55% of the vote.

Lee lost the 2025 election by about 54% according to published King County election results.

During his tenure on the Bellevue City Council, Lee has faced multiple campaign-finance and ethics disputes:

1. Solicitation of city employees (2009): In October 2009, Lee sent nearly two dozen emails from his personal and campaign accounts to Bellevue city employees at their official addresses, asking them to contribute to, attend fundraisers for, and endorse his re-election campaign—actions that contravened Washington state law prohibiting elected officials from soliciting contributions from their own agency’s staff.
2. Public Disclosure Commission fines (2010): In May 2010, the State Public Disclosure Commission found Lee’s 2009 campaign guilty of failing to timely report $23,427 in general expenditures and $3,981 on election mailings. This imposed a $500 fine.
3. Late PAC‐report filings (2013): In January 2013, Lee was fined $300 by the Washington PDC for failing to timely file a series of reports for New Americans for Accountable Government, a super‐PAC he formed in 2010. This marked a repeat of his earlier reporting lapse, prompting criticism that he had “not learned his lesson”

In April 2025, Lee gave $50,000 to President Donald Trump’s inaugural committee. He was listed among Washington donors whose contributions entitled them to face-to-face encounters with senior administration officials, raising questions about the influence purchased by mid-level inaugural gifts.
