= Shannon Braddock =

American politician

9th Executive of King County
- Acting
- In office April 1, 2025 – November 25, 2025
- Preceded by: Dow Constantine
- Succeeded by: Girmay Zahilay

Personal details
- Born: 1969 or 1970 (age 56–57) Bellingham, Washington, U.S.
- Party: Democratic
- Children: 3
- Education: Western Washington University (BA); University of Washington (MPP)

Shannon Braddock (born 1969 or 1970) is an American politician who was appointed King County Executive on April 1, 2025, after Dow Constantine resigned to become CEO of Sound Transit. A Democrat, she was the first female King County executive. She was succeeded by Girmay Zahilay, who was elected in 2025.

== Biography ==
Braddock was raised in Bellingham, Washington, where her father was a City Council member and state legislator before serving as secretary of the state Department of Social and Health Services. She graduated from Western Washington University, and later the University of Washington where she earned her Master of Public Policy.

Prior to working in the King County government, Braddock worked as a congressional aide, an aide to the Democratic Lieutenant Governor Bob Bullock, and a legislative representative for Lafayette PTA. In 2010, she was hired as chief of staff to then-County Councilmember Joe McDermott after she volunteered for his campaign. In 2017, Braddock began working in the County Executive office under Constantine, moving up to Deputy Executive in 2023.

== Political career ==
=== 2015 Seattle City Council election ===
Braddock ran for the Seattle City Council in 2015 in the open District 1 seat, which encompasses West Seattle and South Park. She faced eight other challengers, which included Lisa Herbold, an aide to councilmember Nick Licata, Phil Tavel, a pro-tempore judge and public defender, and Brianna Thomas, a non-profit organizer. In the August primary, Herbold came in first, with 30.15% of the vote, and advanced to the general election with Braddock, who earned 27.78%.

Both Braddock and Herbold ran as progressives, but Braddock received $200,000 in outside spending, primarily from the Metropolitan Seattle Chamber of Commerce. In the November general election, Herbold narrowly defeated Braddock, 49.57% to 49.59%, a margin of 39 votes.

=== 2018 34th Legislative District Senate election ===
In 2018, Braddock ran for the open 34th district Senate seat after incumbent Sharon Nelson decided to retire at the end of her term. The 34th district includes White Center, West Seattle, Vashon Island, and part of Burien. She faced 10 other challengers, which included Joe Nguyen, a senior manager at Microsoft, and Sofia Aragon, a governmental-affairs adviser for the Washington State Nurses Association. In the August primary, Nguyen came in first, with 31% of the vote, and advanced to the general election with Braddock, who earned 24%.

Braddock focused her campaign on gun safety, early education, and tax reform, specifically creating a capital gains tax and lowering property taxes for low and middle-income individuals. Nguyen campaigned on increasing teacher pay, making health care and housing affordable, strengthening public transit, and protecting the environment without placing an undue tax burden on low-income households. Braddock was endorsed by The Seattle Times, Constantine, McDermott, 34th District Democrats, and the Alliance for Gun Responsibility. Nguyen was endorsed by U.S. representative Pramila Jayapal, The Stranger, 34th District Democrats, King County Democrats, and state senators. Maralyn Chase and Bob Hasegawa. Braddock outraised Nguyen, who refused corporate PAC money.

In the November general election, Nguyen defeated Braddock, 58.29% to 41.71%.

== King County Executive ==
On April 1, 2025, Braddock was appointed King County Executive after Constantine resigned to become CEO of Sound Transit. She initially served on an acting basis until the King County Council voted unanimously to fill the position on an interim bases until the November general election. Braddock announced a "200 day plan" for her abbreviated term, which focused on passing a responsible budget and preparing the county for possible funding cuts from a hostile federal government.

== Personal life ==
Braddock is a mother of three children.
