= 2021 King County Executive election =

- November 2, 2021
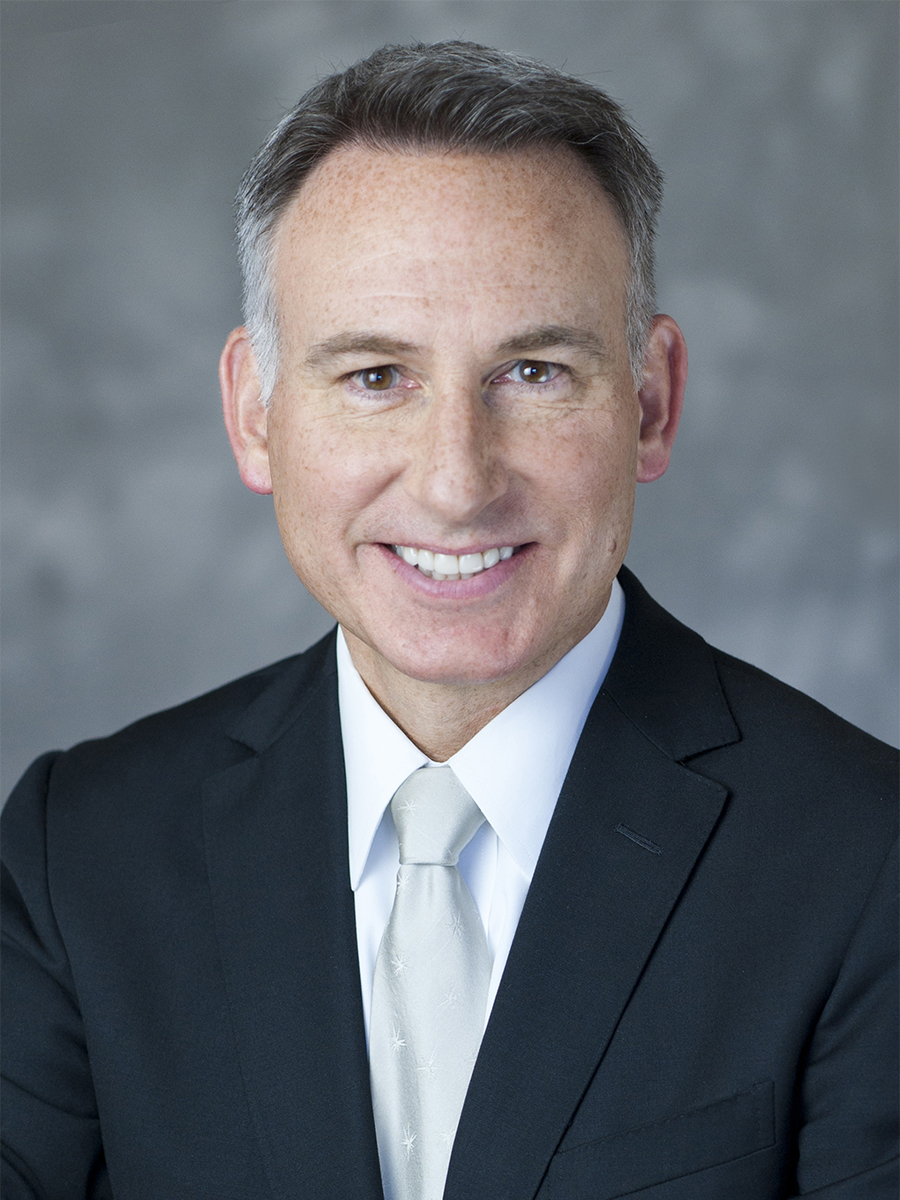

Candidate	Dow Constantine	Joe Nguyen
Party	Nonpartisan	Nonpartisan
Popular vote	312,663	253,609
Percentage	54.57%	44.27%
County Executive before election
Dow Constantine
Nonpartisan
Elected County Executive
Dow Constantine
Nonpartisan

The 2021 King County Executive election took place on November 2, 2021, following a primary election on August 3, 2021. Incumbent County Executive Dow Constantine ran for re-election to a fourth term. He was challenged by four opponents, the most well-known of whom was State Senator Joe Nguyen. In the nonpartisan primary, Constantine placed first with 52 percent of the vote and advanced to the general election against Nguyen, who won 33 percent. In the closest race that Constantine faced, he defeated Nguyen to win his final term as County Executive, 55–44 percent. Ultimately, Constantine would not serve out his full fourth term, and resigned in 2025 to become the CEO of Sound Transit.

== Primary election ==
=== Candidates ===
- Dow Constantine, incumbent County Executive
- Joe Nguyen, State Senator
- Bill Hirt, retired engineer, 2017 candidate for County Executive
- Goodspaceguy, perennial candidate
- Johnathon Cranes, security guard

=== Results ===
2021 King County Executive primary election
Party	Candidate	Votes	%
Nonpartisan	Dow Constantine (inc.)	241,478	51.86%
Nonpartisan	Joe Nguyen	151,757	32.59%
Nonpartisan	Bill Hirt	50,553	10.86%
Nonpartisan	Goodspaceguy	12,877	2.77%
Nonpartisan	Johnathon Crines	6,884	1.48%
Write-in		2,075	0.45%
Total votes		465,624	100.00%

== General election ==
=== Forum ===
2021 King County Executive candidate forum
No.	Date	Host	Moderator	Link	Nonpartisan	Nonpartisan
Key: P Participant A Absent N Not invited I Invited W Withdrawn						
Key: P Participant A Absent N Not invited I Invited W Withdrawn					Dow Constantine	Joe Nguyen
1		Washington's 34th legislative district Democratic Party		YouTube	P	P

=== Results ===
2021 King County Executive election
Party	Candidate	Votes	%
Nonpartisan	Dow Constantine (inc.)	312,663	54.57%
Nonpartisan	Joe Nguyen	253,609	44.27%
Write-in		6,639	1.16%
Total votes		572,911	100.00%
