= Girmay Zahilay =

American politician (born 1987)

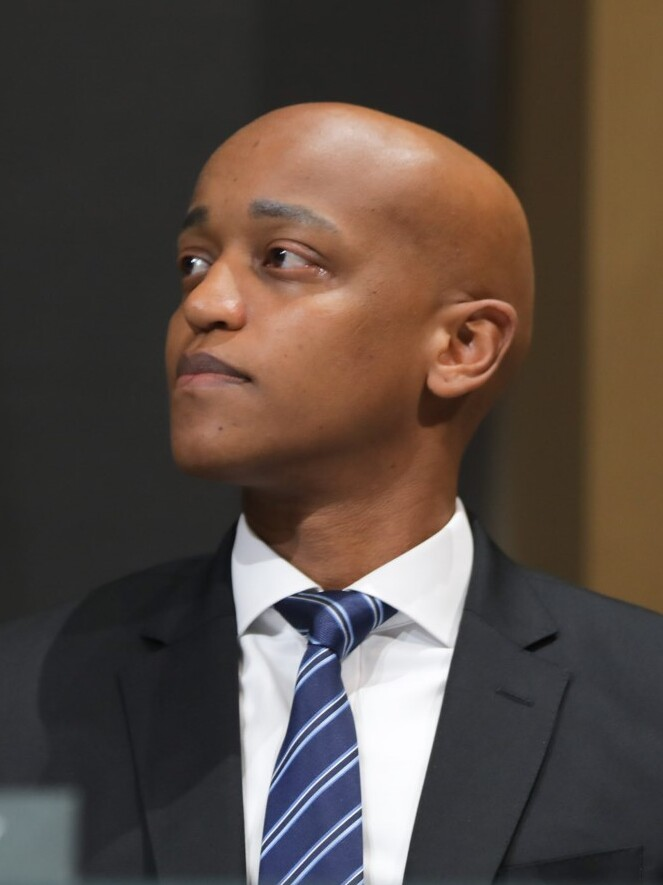

10th Executive of King County
- Incumbent
- Assumed office November 25, 2025
- Preceded by: Shannon Braddock (acting)

Member of the King County Council from the 2nd district
- In office January 8, 2020 – November 25, 2025
- Preceded by: Larry Gossett
- Succeeded by: Rhonda Lewis

Personal details
- Born: Girmay Hadish Zahilay; May 6, 1987 (age 39) Sudan
- Party: Democratic
- Education: Stanford University (BA); University of Pennsylvania (JD)
- Website: County Council website

Girmay Hadish Zahilay (/ˈɡɜːrmaɪ ˈzɑːhɪlaɪ/ GUR-my ZAH-hil-eye; born May 6, 1987) is an American politician who has served as the King County Executive since 2025. He was formerly a member of the King County Council from District 2. He was elected to King County Council in 2019, defeating longtime incumbent Larry Gossett. In 2025, Zahilay was elected King County Executive, succeeding interim appointee Shannon Braddock.

== Early life and education ==
Zahilay and his brother were born in Sudan to Ethiopian refugees from Tigray who had escaped military conflict. He was three years old when his family immigrated to the United States, settling in Rainier Valley. Zahilay moved between public housing arrangements in several South Seattle neighborhoods, including the International District and Skyway, while his mother Abie worked double shifts as a nursing assistant. The family also stayed at a homeless shelter in Downtown Seattle between moves to public housing in New Holly and Rainier Vista.

Zahilay attended Asa Mercer Middle School in Seattle. He graduated from Franklin High School in Seattle and was a research intern at the University of Washington Department of Biology. He majored in biology at Stanford University, where he served as president of the Black Student Union. Zahilay earned a Juris Doctor from the University of Pennsylvania and worked as an intern at the Office of the White House Counsel during the Obama administration.

== Career ==
Zahilay worked for the Congressional Hunger Center and New York City Coalition Against Hunger as a community organizer after graduating from college. He then moved to jobs at law firms Skadden Arps in New York and Perkins Coie in Seattle. Zahilay also founded a non-profit, Rising Leaders, that aims to provide mentors for underserved middle school students.

=== King County Council ===
In 2019, Girmay Zahilay was elected to the King County Council, serving District 2, which includes the University District, Laurelhurst, Ravenna, Eastlake, Capitol Hill, the Central District, South Seattle, Allentown, and Skyway. Zahilay was sworn in to represent District 2 on January 8, 2020, and was selected to chair the council's Law and Justice Committee.

Zahilay announced his campaign for the King County Council in February 2019, becoming the first challenger to six-term District 2 incumbent Larry Gossett since 2005. Zahilay campaigned on the expansion of public housing and the replacement of youth incarceration with other methods. Gossett trailed Zahilay in the primary election by a 37 percent margin. Zahilay defeated Gossett in the November 2019 general election, becoming the youngest member of the King County Council.

==== Committee assignments ====
Zahilay served as Chair of the Law and Justice Committee beginning in 2020. In 2022 the Law and Justice Committee merged with the Health and Human Services Committee to become the Law Justice Health and Human Services Committee. In 2024 he was named Chair of the Budget and Fiscal Management Committee.

King County Council committees of which Zahilay has been a member include Local Services and Land Use, Employment and Administration, Transportation Economy and Environment, the Board of Health, and the Regional Policy Committee. Zahilay served as a King County Council appointee to the Puget Sound Regional Council (PSRC) Transportation Committee and the PSRC Governing Board.

==== Programs ====
In partnership with community-based organizations such as Urban Family and the Rainier Beach Action Coalition, Zahilay initiated a pilot program for guaranteed basic income that provided $1,000 in monthly payments to families with extremely low income over the span of a year. This program was launched in collaboration with University of Washington Evans School MPA students.

In the 2021–2022 annual budget, Zahilay secured $10 million for a community center in Skyway, an unincorporated area that had lacked many services. The county council allocated $6 million to increase bus service in the Skyway area, including an on-demand van service for residents. Zahilay advocated for a tiny house village in Skyway with 35 units that opened in 2021.

In response to the significant rise in addiction and mental health issues in King County that have contributed to public safety concerns, Zahilay worked with the King County Executive to propose the Crisis Care Centers Levy. This proposal, which voters approved in April 2023, would fund the construction of five treatment centers for people suffering from behavioral health challenges, build back the region's long-term mental health bed capacity, and invest in the behavioral health workforce.

=== King County Executive ===
On December 2, 2024, Zahilay announced that he would run for King County Executive in the 2025 election. He was the second incumbent county councilmember to announce their campaign, following Claudia Balducci, as 16-year incumbent Dow Constantine would not seek another term. Zahilay advanced from the primary election with 44 percent of the vote alongside Balducci. He led in almost all Seattle and southern King County precincts, while Balducci's support was primarily concentrated in the Eastside suburbs. The candidates were noted for their similar stances on various issues, including housing policy, mental health services, and public transit.

Zahilay was projected the winner of the race over Balducci on November 7, 2025, three days after the election; Balducci conceded on the same day. He was sworn in as county executive on November 25 after the certification of the general election results and immediately replaced interim appointee Shannon Braddock. Zahilay is the youngest person to become King County Executive as well as the first immigrant. His return-to-office policy for county workers, announced in January 2026 and implemented over several months, resulted in protests from workers who had been covered by telework agreements.
