= King County Executive =

King county chief executive officer

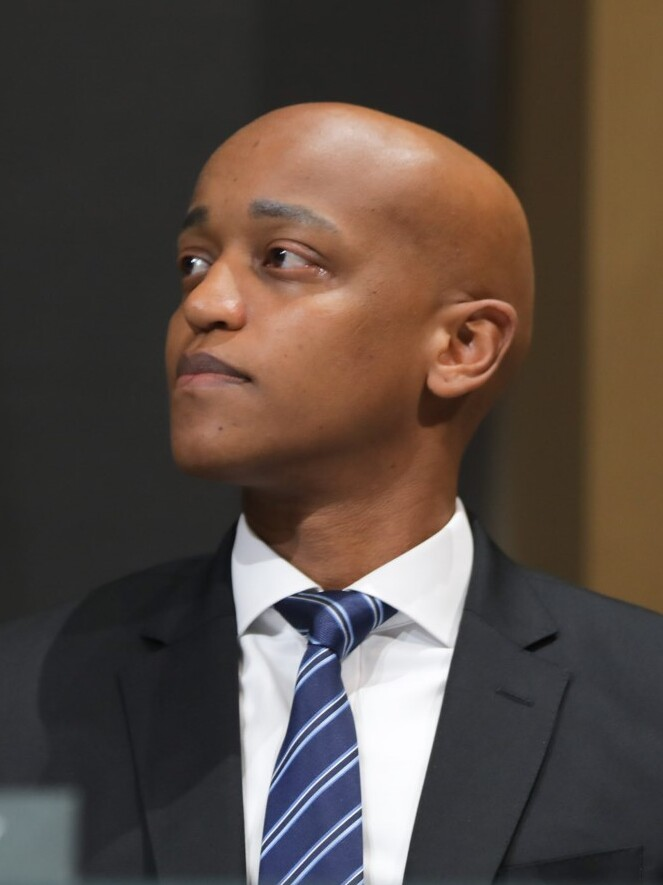
- Incumbent; Girmay Zahilay since November 25, 2025
- Appointer: Electorate; Metropolitan King County Council (unexpired terms)
- Term length: 4 years
- Inaugural holder: John Spellman
- Formation: November 5, 1968 (charter approved); May 1, 1969 (charter took effect)
- Salary: $280,584 (2024)
- Website: King County Executive

The King County Executive is the elected county executive of King County, Washington. The office was established with the implementation of a home rule charter for King County on November 5, 1968. The executive's powers were originally vested in a three-member county commission, which was eliminated in the home rule charter and replaced by the King County Council. The county executive is elected every four years and the office is nonpartisan.

The first county executive was John Spellman, from 1969 to 1981. The current executive is Girmay Zahilay, who served on the King County Council prior to his election.

== Powers and responsibilities ==
The King County Executive holds all executive power of the county which are not expressly vested in other specific elective officers. All administrative offices and departments in the executive branch are supervised and assigned duties by the county executive. The county executive holds the responsibility as the chief peace officer and must execute and enforce all ordinances and state statues within King County. They are also responsible for presenting the county council with an annual statement of the financial and governmental affairs from the previous year along with a budget for the next fiscal year. The county executive has the power to veto ordinances adopted by the county council. The county executive is also responsible for signing all deeds, contracts, and other instruments on behalf of the county.

== History ==
In 1853, Washington operated under territorial law where the administration of each county was governed by an elected three-member board of county commissioners. Under this law, the commissioners held greater legislative and executive powers. They passed laws, appropriated money, established tax cuts, ran county departments, and appointed county officials. Under the provisions of a home rule law passed by the Washington State Legislature in 1948, King County adopted a new charter in 1968 that created the position of county executive and a nine-member county council to serve as the legislative branch of government. In 1969, John Spellman was elected to office as the first county executive.

== Elections ==
Elections for the County Executive have historically taken place in odd-numbered years. However, in 2022, an amendment to the County Charter was passed which would move elections for several county elected offices to even-numbered years. To do so, the 2025 election will be for a three-year term, instead of the normal four years.

== List of executives ==
Order	King County Executive	Party (Note: The office of King County Executive is elected on a non-partisan basis, the following is for informational purposes only.)	Took office	Left office	Terms	Notes
1	John Spellman	Republican	May 1, 1969	January 14, 1981	3+	Resigned to serve as Governor of Washington
2	Ron Dunlap	Republican	January 14, 1981 (Note: Appointed to serve out remainder of term)	November 18, 1981	<1	
3	Randy Revelle	Democratic	November 18, 1981	January 1, 1986	1	
4	Tim Hill	Republican	January 1, 1986	January 4, 1994	2	
5	Gary Locke	Democratic	January 4, 1994	January 15, 1997	<1	Resigned to serve as Governor of Washington
6	Ron Sims	Democratic	January 15, 1997 (Note: Subsequently elected to full four-year term)	May 8, 2009	2+	Resigned to serve as Deputy Secretary of Housing and Urban Development
7	Kurt Triplett	Democratic	May 8, 2009	November 24, 2009	<1	Served briefly following Ron Sims' resignation
8	Dow Constantine	Democratic	November 24, 2009	March 31, 2025	4	Resigned to serve as CEO of Sound Transit.
9	Shannon Braddock	Democratic	April 1, 2025 (Note: Appointed as interim executive and awaiting confirmation as acting executive.)	November 25, 2025	<1	Served briefly following Dow Constantine's resignation
10	Girmay Zahilay	Democratic	November 25, 2025 (Note: Zahilay was sworn in early due to Braddock being an interim appointee.)	Incumbent	<1	

== See also ==
- Pierce County Executive
- Snohomish County Executive
- Whatcom County Executive
