= 2009 King County Executive election =

- November 3, 2009
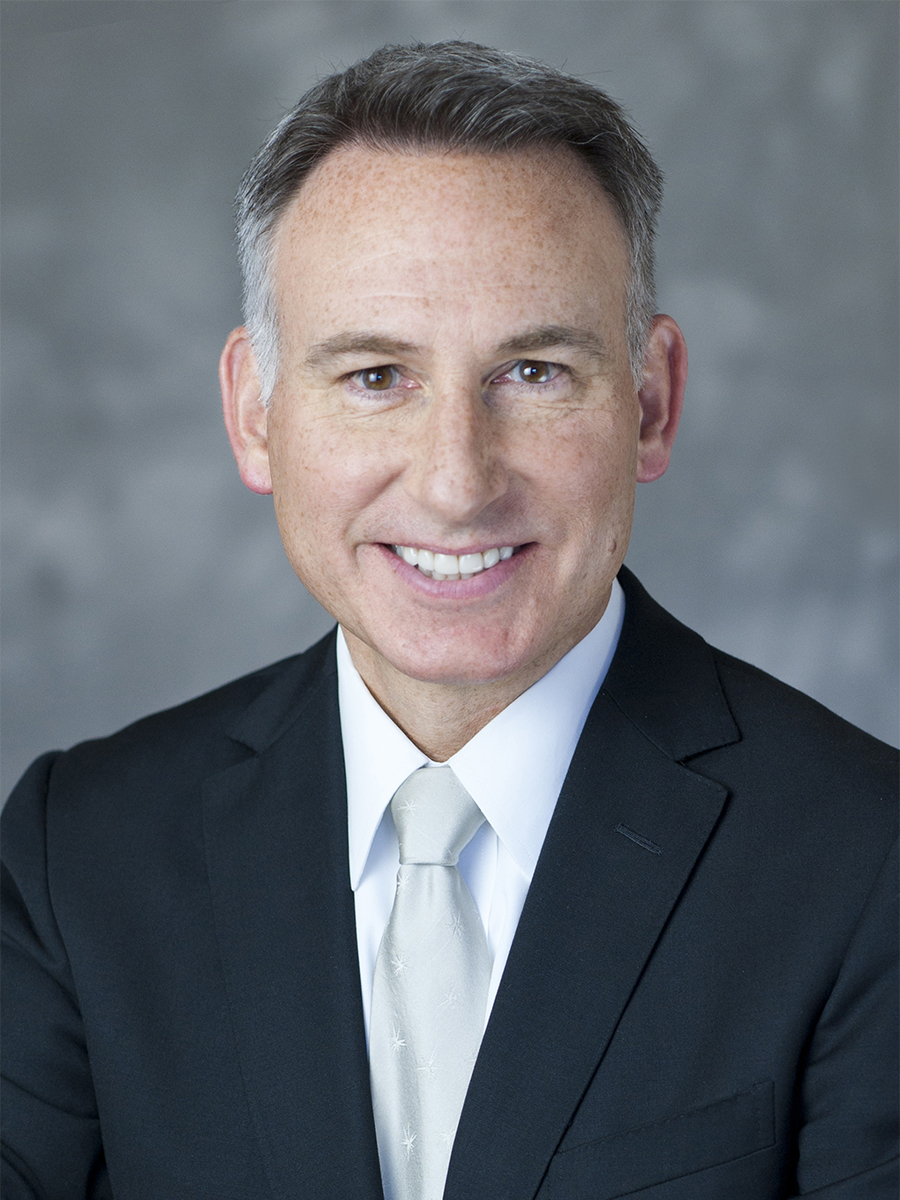

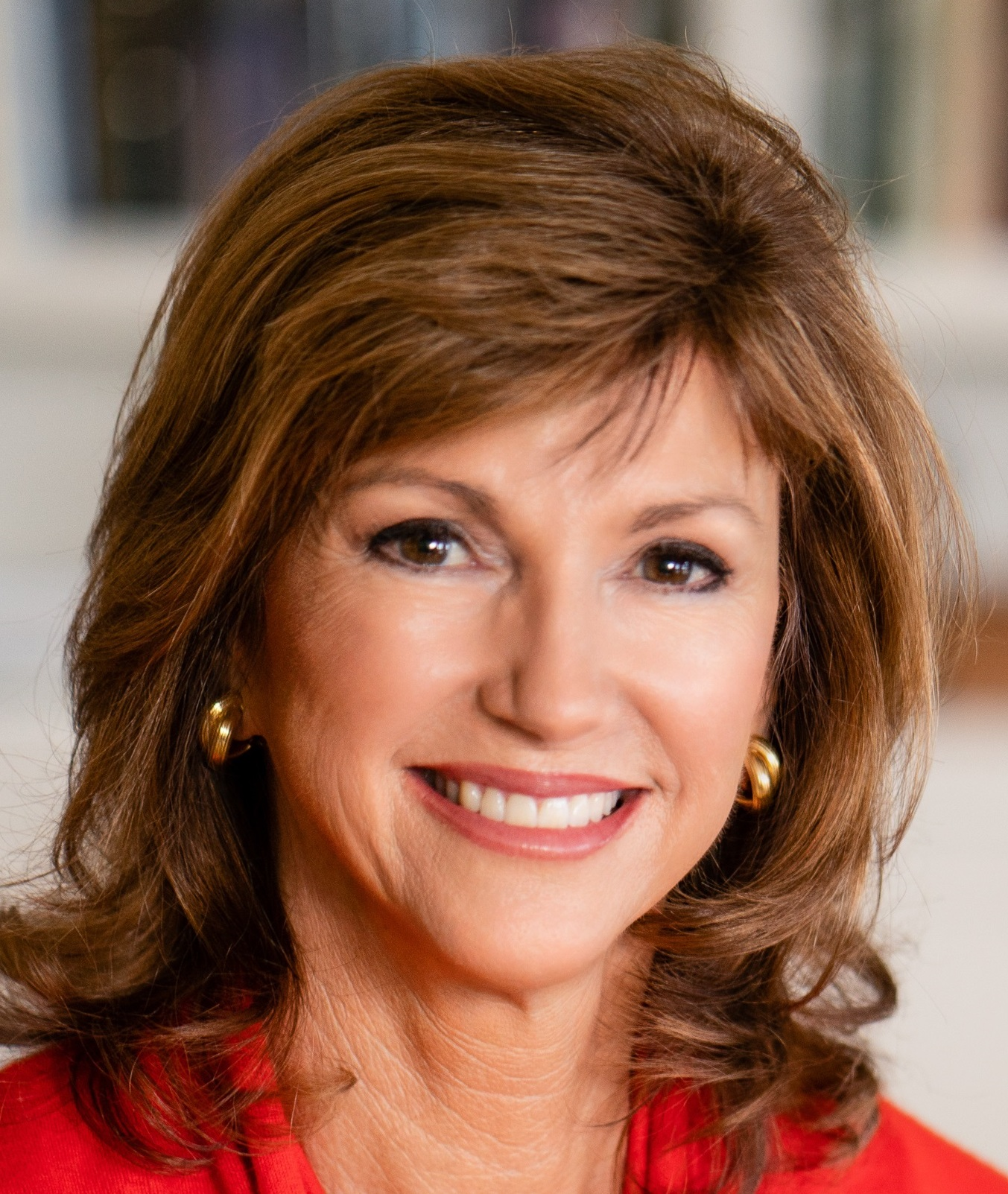
| Nominee | Dow Constantine | Susan Hutchison |
| Popular vote | 325,777 | 224,467 |
| Percentage | 59.04% | 40.68% |
County Executive before election
Kurt Triplett (interim)
Nonpartisan
Elected County Executive
Dow Constantine
Nonpartisan

The 2009 King County Executive election took place on November 3, 2009, following a primary on August 18, 2009. County Executive Ron Sims resigned on May 8, 2009, to become the Deputy Secretary of the U.S. Department of Housing and Urban Development, and designated his chief of staff, Kurt Triplett, as his temporary successor. He was subsequently selected by the County Council to serve as interim County Executive until the November election. Triplett did not run in the election for a full term.

Following the passage of an amendment to the King County Charter in 2008, the election was conducted with a nonpartisan primary. Eight candidates ran in the election, with former news anchor Susan Hutchison finishing first in the primary with 33 percent of the vote, and County Council Chairman Dow Constantine finishing second with 27 percent. In the general election, Constantine, a Democrat, defeated Hutchison, a Republican, by a wide margin, receiving 59 percent of the vote to Hutchison's 41 percent.

== Primary election ==
=== Candidates ===
- Susan Hutchison, former KIRO-TV news anchor
- Dow Constantine, Chairman of the County Council
- Fred Jarrett, State Senator
- Larry Phillips, County Councilmember
- Ross Hunter, State Representative
- Alan Lobdell, public works manager
- Goodspaceguy, perennial candidate
- Stan Lippmann, physicist, perennial candidate

=== Polling ===
| Poll source | Date(s) administered | Sample size (Note: Key: A – all adults RV – registered voters LV – likely voters V – unclear) | Margin of error | Dow Constantine | Larry Phillips | Fred Jarrett | Susan Hutchison | Ross Hunter | Stan Lippmann | Alan Lobdell | Goodspaceguy | Undecided |
|---|---|---|---|---|---|---|---|---|---|---|---|---|
| SurveyUSA | June 3–4, 2009 | 515 (LV) | ± 4.4% | 8% | 9% | 5% | 34% | 5% | – | – | – | 39% |
| SurveyUSA | June 20–22, 2009 | 508 (LV) | ± 4.4% | 12% | 7% | 4% | 41% | 6% | 2% | 2% | 3% | 23% |
| SurveyUSA | July 11–13, 2009 | 504 (LV) | ± 4.5% | 12% | 8% | 7% | 39% | 6% | 1% | 2% | 2% | 22% |
| SurveyUSA | August 1–3, 2009 | 606 (LV) | ± 4.1% | 13% | 6% | 8% | 39% | 8% | 2% | 2% | 2% | 20% |
| SurveyUSA | August 10–11, 2009 | 649 (LV) | ± 3.9% | 20% | 8% | 6% | 37% | 8% | 2% | 2% | 2% | 15% |

=== Results ===
2009 King County Executive primary election
| Party | Candidate | Votes | % |
|---|---|---|---|
| Nonpartisan | Susan Hutchison | 110,052 | 33.05% |
| Nonpartisan | Dow Constantine | 89,833 | 26.98% |
| Nonpartisan | Fred Jarrett | 40,527 | 12.17% |
| Nonpartisan | Larry Phillips | 40,295 | 12.10% |
| Nonpartisan | Ross Hunter | 36,259 | 10.89% |
| Nonpartisan | Alan Lobdell | 7,991 | 2.40% |
| Nonpartisan | Goodspaceguy | 3,884 | 1.17% |
| Nonpartisan | Stan Lippmann | 3,598 | 1.08% |
| Write-in | | 572 | 0.17% |
| Total votes | | 333,011 | 100.00% |

== General election ==
=== Polling ===
| Poll source | Date(s) administered | Sample size | Margin of error | Dow Constantine | Susan Hutchison | Undecided |
|---|---|---|---|---|---|---|
| SurveyUSA | September 1–3, 2009 | 557 (LV) | ± 4.2% | 44% | 47% | 10% |
| SurveyUSA | September 19–21, 2009 | 537 (LV) | ± 4.3% | 44% | 47% | 10% |
| SurveyUSA | October 10–12, 2009 | 523 (LV) | ± 4.4% | 42% | 47% | 11% |
| SurveyUSA | October 29 – November 1, 2009 | 614 (LV) | ± 4.0% | 53% | 43% | 5% |

=== Results ===
2009 King County Executive election
| Party | Candidate | Votes | % |
|---|---|---|---|
| Nonpartisan | Dow Constantine | 325,777 | 59.04% |
| Nonpartisan | Susan Hutchison | 224,467 | 40.68% |
| Write-in | | 1,537 | 0.28% |
| Total votes | | 551,781 | 100.00% |
