= Sound Transit =

Regional transit for the Seattle area

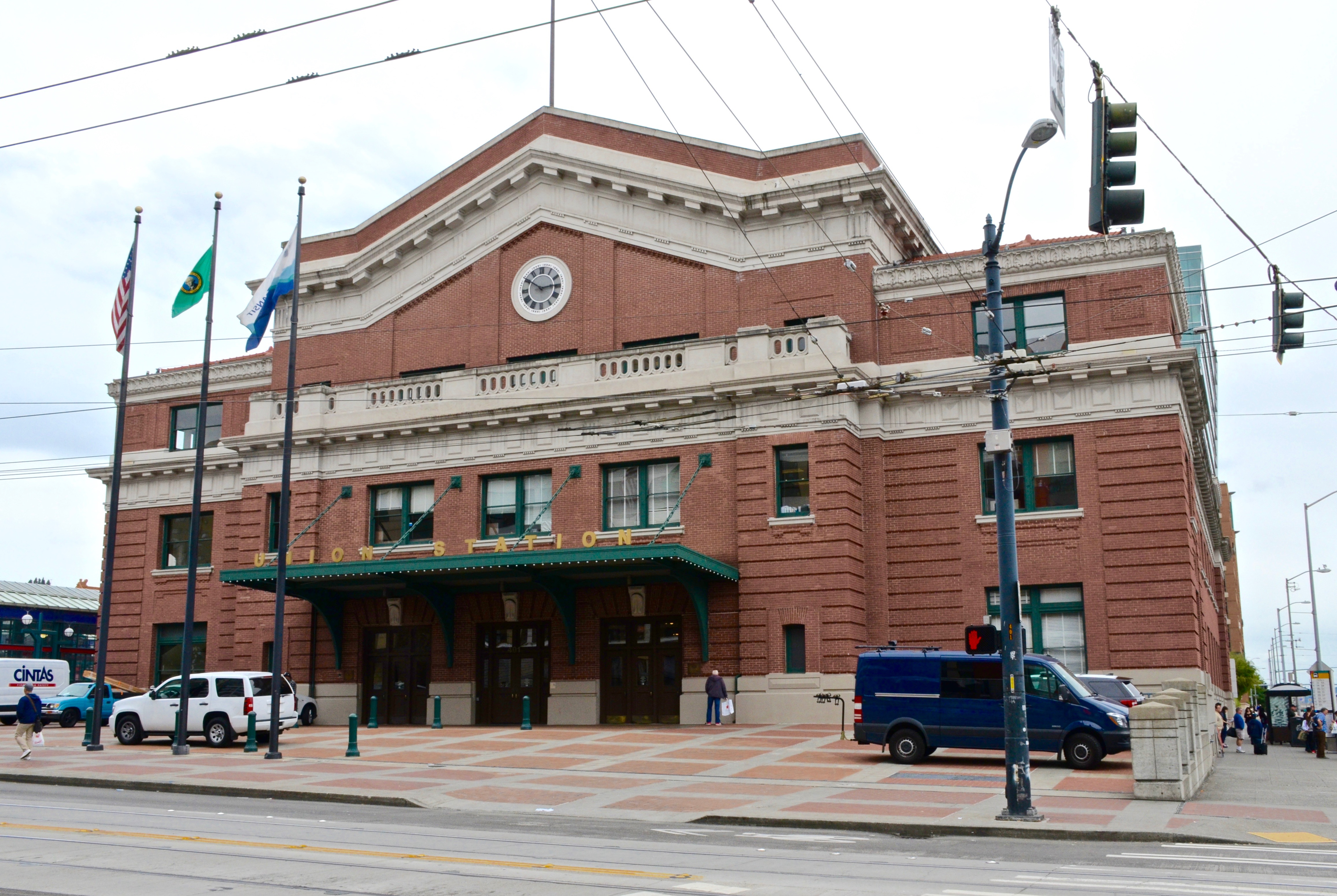
- Union Station, Sound Transit's headquarters since 1999

Agency overview
- Formed: September 17, 1993
- Type: Regional transit authority
- Jurisdiction: Seattle metropolitan area
- Headquarters: Union Station 401 S. Jackson Street Seattle, Washington, U.S.; 47°35′56″N 122°19′43″W
- Motto: "Ride the Wave"
- Employees: 1,914
- Annual budget: $3.3 billion (2026)
- Agency executive: Dow Constantine, CEO
- Key document: Revised Code of Washington Chapter 81.112
- Website: soundtransit.org

Map
- Sound Transit district boundaries

The Central Puget Sound Regional Transit Authority, branded as Sound Transit (ST), is a public transit agency serving the Seattle metropolitan area in the U.S. state of Washington. It manages the Link light rail system in Seattle and Tacoma, regional Sounder commuter rail, and Sound Transit Express bus service. The agency also coordinates with the regional ORCA fare card system used by transit operators across the metropolitan area. In 2025, Sound Transit services carried approximately 51 million total passengers and averaged over 153,000 riders on weekdays.

The agency was created in 1993 by King, Pierce and Snohomish counties to build a regional rapid transit system. After an unsuccessful proposal in 1995, the "Sound Move" plan for regional light rail, commuter rail, and express bus service was approved by voters in November 1996. Sound Transit began operating its express bus service in September 1999, taking over existing routes from local transit agencies. The region's first commuter rail line, between Tacoma and Seattle, started in December 2000; the agency's first light rail line, Tacoma Link (now the T Line), began service in August 2003. Light rail service in Seattle on Central Link (now the 1 Line) began in 2009, and is the largest part of the Sound Transit system in terms of ridership. Union Station in Seattle has served as the agency's headquarters since its renovation in 1999.

Sound Transit is independent of local transit agencies and is governed by an eighteen-member board of directors, which consists of elected officials from member jurisdictions and the Secretary of Transportation. It is funded by local sales taxes, property taxes, and motor vehicle excise taxes levied within its taxing district in portions of King, Pierce and Snohomish counties. The agency has passed three major ballot measures to fund system expansion: Sound Move (1996), Sound Transit 2 (2008) and Sound Transit 3 (2016). Planning and construction of transit projects is scheduled to continue until 2041 under the Sound Transit 3 plan, which would expand the light rail network to 116 miles (187 km) and 83 stations.

== Services ==
Sound Transit services

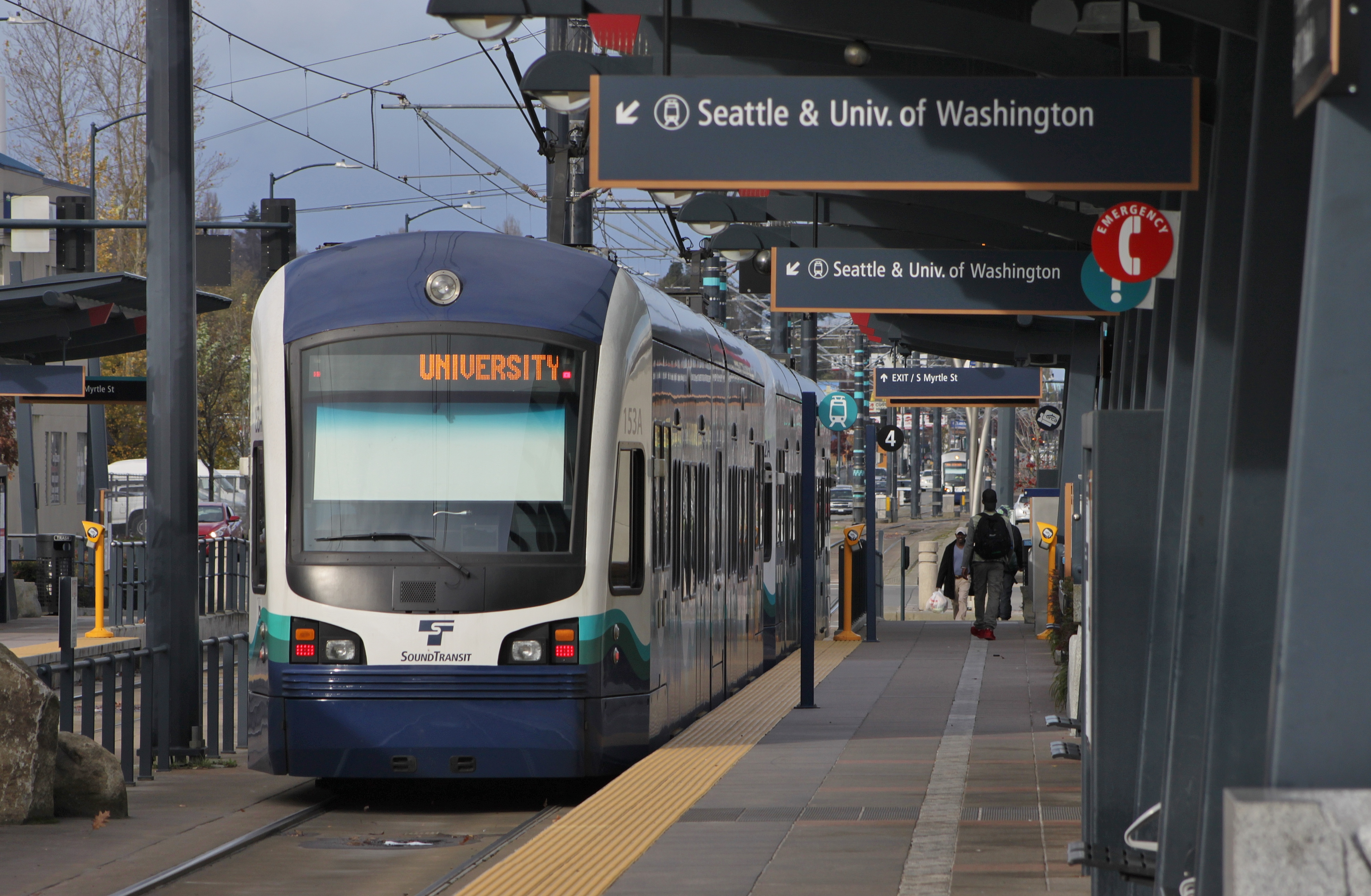
A Link light rail train on the 1 Line in Seattle

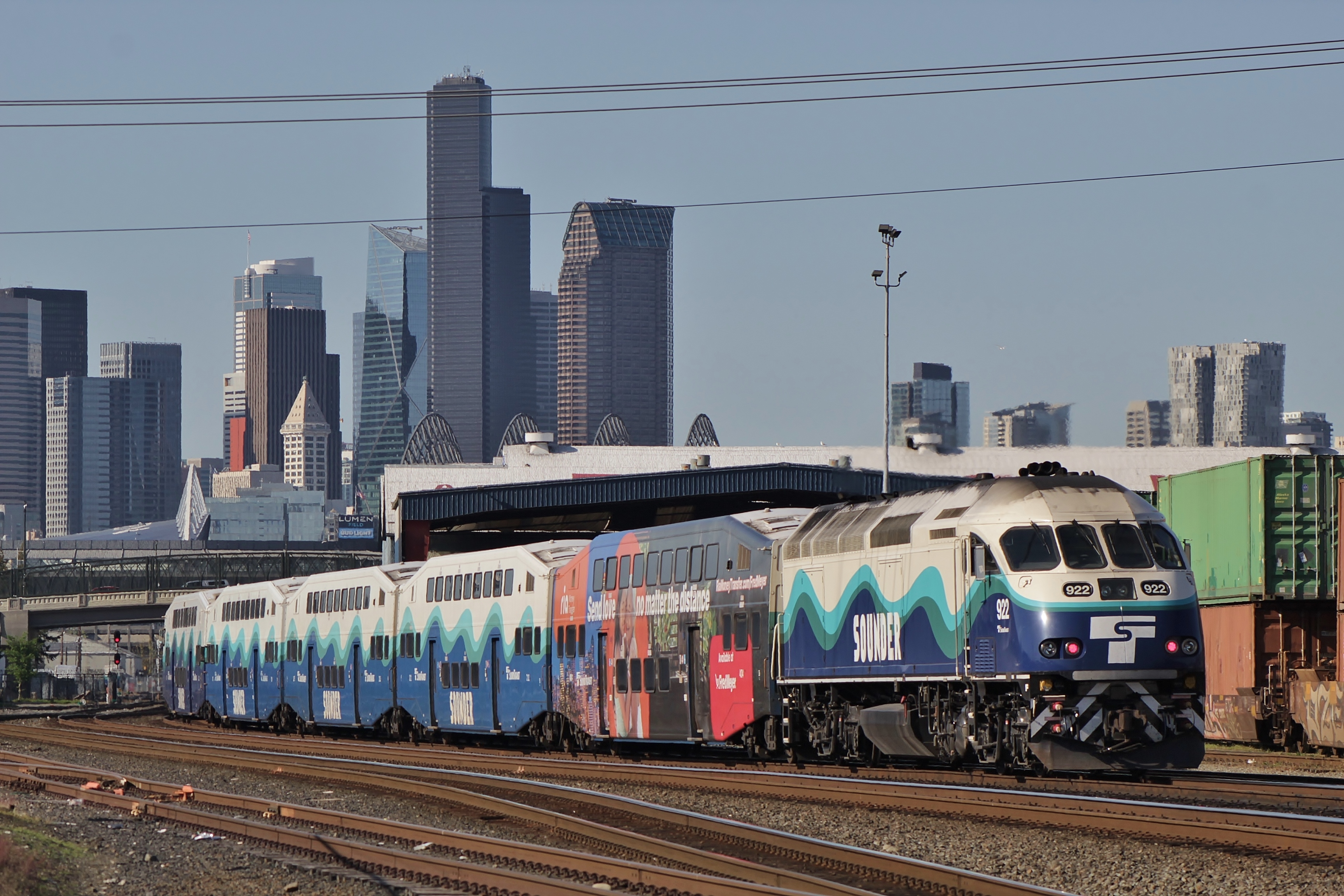
A Sounder commuter train leaving Downtown Seattle

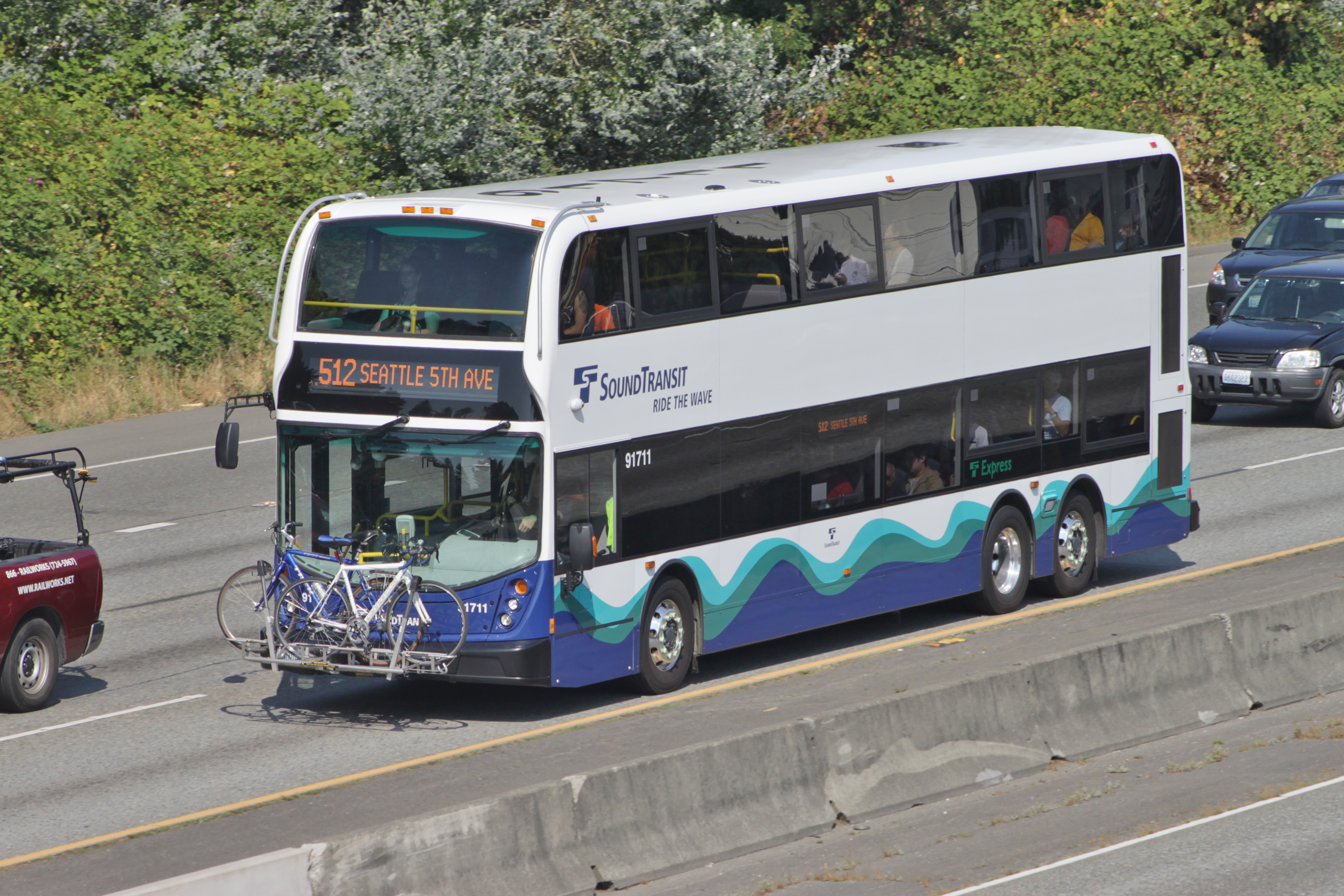
A double-decker Sound Transit Express bus on Interstate 5 in Seattle

Sound Transit operates three main transit services across the Seattle metropolitan area: the Link light rail system, which serves as the rapid transit system for the region; the Sounder commuter rail system from Everett to Lakewood, via Seattle; and the Sound Transit Express bus system across the three counties. In 2025, these systems carried nearly 51 million total passengers, averaging 153,430 riders per day on weekdays. A fourth service, Stride bus rapid transit, is planned to be introduced in the late 2020s. Sound Transit's services use a unified livery and paint scheme that consists of blue, teal, and green waves against a white background. Link, Sounder, and Stride all use the same naming scheme for lines and services, which switched from colors to numbers and letters in 2021.

As of 2026, Sound Transit has a fleet of 574 vehicles for use on its services. The fleet is composed of 218 low-floor light rail vehicles for the 1 and 2 Lines; 8 streetcars for the T Line; 78 bilevel cars and 14 locomotives for Sounder; and 256 buses for Sound Transit Express. The entire Link and Sound Transit Express fleet is considered accessible, with level boarding or ramps and lifts. Sounder trains have a high platform with a designated level boarding area for ramps. All vehicles are also equipped to carry bicycles in racks; Sound Transit also provides bicycle cages at some stations. By 2027, the agency plans to deploy an additional 10 light rail vehicles for Link and 44 battery electric buses for the Stride bus rapid transit system, including double-decker buses.

=== Link light rail ===
The Link light rail system encompasses three lines with 63 miles (101 km) of track and 51 stations in three counties. The 1 Line and 2 Line are interconnected and share stations between Snohomish County and Seattle. After the two lines split in Seattle, the 1 Line continues south to SeaTac and Federal Way; the 2 Line travels east to Bellevue and Redmond. The T Line is disconnected from the rest of the system and operates entirely within Tacoma. Link trains carried 39.1 million passengers in 2025 and averaged 113,394 passengers on weekdays across all three lines. It is the fourth-busiest light rail system in the United States by annual ridership, behind Los Angeles, San Diego, and Boston.

Link trains generally run seven days a week at frequencies of 4 to 24 minutes, with stops spaced closely together. All stations are accessible and most offer connections to nearby buses or a park and ride facility. The system is planned to expand to 83 stations and 116 miles (187 km) by 2050, with five lines serving all three counties. 1 Line and 2 Line trains are operated and maintained under contract with King County Metro and are able to use longer, four-car trainsets that have a typical capacity of 150 passengers in each car. The T Line uses low-floor streetcars, unable to be coupled into pairs, and are the only Sound Transit service to be directly operated and maintained by the agency rather than a contractor.

=== Sounder commuter rail ===
Sounder is the regional commuter rail service managed by Sound Transit and has two lines that intersect at King Street Station in Downtown Seattle. Trains generally run during rush hours with limited service at other times, including weekend trains for special events. The N Line connects Seattle to Everett, stopping at two intermediate stations in Snohomish County. The S Line connects Seattle to Tacoma and Lakewood, stopping at six other stations in Pierce County and southern King County. Trains are operated under contract by BNSF Railway crews on the company's leased tracks, while the vehicles are maintained by Amtrak. Sounder uses a fleet of Bombardier BiLevel Coach passenger cars that each have a seating capacity of 130 to 146 passengers depending on their configuration. They have restrooms, space for bicycles and wheelchairs, tables, cupholders, power outlets, and Wi-Fi. The S Line typically uses an eight-car configuration that carries 950 seated passengers, while the N Line uses two to three cars in normal service that can carry 300 to 450 passengers. In 2025, Sounder trains carried 2.1 million total passengers and averaged 7,830 weekday boardings.

=== Sound Transit Express ===
Sound Transit Express comprises 21 limited-stop express bus routes that provide regional service to cities in all three counties, primarily using a network of high-occupancy vehicle lanes (HOV lanes) on state-maintained freeways. Some routes operate seven days a week, while others are limited to rush hours only. These routes normally have wide distances between stops, which are primarily hubs and transfer points in cities and suburban areas where local routes operated by other agencies connect; many stops also have park and ride lots. Sound Transit funded the construction of new transit hubs, park and ride lots, and direct access ramps to the HOV lanes as part of the rollout and expansion of express buses. In 2025, the express buses carried 9.8 million total passengers and had a weekday average of 32,206 riders. The busiest route was Route 545, which connects Seattle to Redmond and carried 1.3 million riders.

The fleet of 256 buses is owned by Sound Transit and includes double-decker buses with up to 81 seats, articulated buses, high-floor motorcoaches, and standard buses with a minimum of 42 seats. These buses include upholstered and cushioned seats that are able to recline, footrests, overhead luggage racks, air conditioning, reading lights, and bicycle racks. Sound Transit Express buses use diesel or compressed natural gas for fuel, along with several hybrid electric buses. They are operated and maintained under contracts with local transit authorities (Community Transit, King County Metro, and Pierce Transit) who also deploy shuttle buses during disruptions to rail services.

=== Stride ===
A bus rapid transit system, named Stride, was funded by the Sound Transit 3 ballot measure and is scheduled to open in the late 2020s. Stride is planned to have three lines: the S1 Line on Interstate 405 between Burien and Bellevue, scheduled to open in late 2028; the S2 Line on Interstate 405 between Bellevue and Lynnwood, scheduled to open in 2029; and the S3 Line on State Route 522 between Shoreline South/148th station and Bothell, scheduled to open in 2028.

=== Paratransit ===
Sound Transit contracts with Community Transit, King County Metro, and Pierce Transit to provide paratransit service along the Link light rail network in compliance with the Americans with Disabilities Act. Costs are split equally between Sound Transit and the contracted provider within the Link corridor. The agency is not required to operate paratransit service along Sounder and Sound Transit Express routes.

== Fares ==
All of Sound Transit's services accept payment via the regional ORCA card, a contactless proximity card with stored fares and passes. Passengers may also pay using contactless and mobile credit or debit cards, mobile ticketing through the Transit GO Ticket app, and with cash. As of 2026, fares on Link and Sound Transit Express use a flat rate of $3.00, while Sounder passengers pay between $3.25 and $5.75, depending on the distance traveled. Discounts are offered for eligible low-income households, senior citizens, and people with disabilities. Youth passengers age 18 and under are not charged a fare as part of a statewide program. Sound Transit's light rail and commuter rail stations do not have faregates or turnstiles, instead relying on proof of payment that is enforced by fare ambassadors.

== History ==
=== Background and early studies ===
Map of the proposed Forward Thrust rapid transit system from the second referendum in 1970

The waters of Puget Sound and the surrounding region's navigable rivers were the primary transportation corridors for the indigenous Coast Salish peoples as well as later settlers who arrived in the 19th century. A series of scheduled steamboat trips in the 1880s grew into the "mosquito fleet", the main mode of passenger and freight transportation for the growing region through the turn of the 20th century. It waned in importance as railroads and streetcar systems were constructed around Puget Sound; these services, later supplemented by interurban trains, grew in the early 20th century to serve a growing number of passenger commuters. The Seattle Municipal Street Railway had a 231-mile (372 km) streetcar and cable railway system by 1935, while private companies ran interurban services north to Everett and south to Tacoma. These rail services were all abandoned or converted into bus routes by 1941 as automobile adoption in the Seattle area contributed to a need for more developed highways and later freeways.

The first major proposal for a rapid transit system to serve Seattle and the surrounding region was drafted by urban planner and civil engineer Virgil Bogue in 1911 as part of a comprehensive plan. Bogue's plan was rejected by a wide margin in the March 1912 municipal election; the city's three major newspapers had all opposed it. The Forward Thrust program, formed in the 1960s by civic activists, proposed the development of a 47-mile (76 km) subway system that covered Seattle, Renton, and Bellevue by 1985. Two-thirds of the $1.15 billion (equivalent to $7.89 billion in 2024 dollars) construction cost would be funded by the federal government, contingent on the approval of local funding. The first referendum in February 1968 failed to reach the 60 percent supermajority needed to pass; a second attempt was made in May 1970, but failed amid a spree of layoffs by Boeing that severely affected the local economy. The federal earmark was instead used to build the Metropolitan Atlanta Rapid Transit Authority's subway system in Atlanta, Georgia.

The Seattle Transit System, the successor to the municipal streetcars, struggled to secure funding to modernize its fleet in the 1960s but launched the region's first express bus system, named Blue Streak, in 1970 between Downtown Seattle and a park and ride lot in Northgate. The successful route led to plans to develop a network of express buses across the region by using the then-new freeway system and express lanes. The regional water quality agency, Municipality of Metropolitan Seattle (Metro), led planning of the network; Metro later took over operations of the Seattle Transit System and a suburban company in January 1973 following the approval of King County voters in a September 1972 special election. Metro Transit's ridership reached 66 million passengers in 1980—exceeding its original projections—and an increase in bus trips led to congestion on downtown streets. A tunnel for buses began construction in 1987 and was opened in 1990 for a fleet of dual-mode electric and diesel buses; the tunnel was also designed for eventual conversion to accommodate a rail system.

Metro and the Puget Sound Council of Governments, the inter-county metropolitan planning organization for the Seattle area, completed a study in 1986 to identify potential corridors for a modern light rail system. King County voters approved an advisory measure in November 1988 to endorse accelerated planning of a light rail system as well as a commuter rail line by 2000. The Washington State Legislature also convened a rail development commission to study a regional transit system that later incorporated Metro's unfinished plans. The commission endorsed the creation of a regional transit board composed of politicians from King, Pierce, and Snohomish counties, which was authorized by the state legislature in 1990. The Joint Regional Policy Committee was formed in 1991 and approved its final long-range plan for regional transit two years later. The $12 billion (equivalent to $23.5 billion in 2024 dollars) plan comprised a 105-mile (169 km) light rail system from Everett to Tacoma and Redmond; commuter rail from Everett and Tacoma to Seattle; and improvements to local and express buses. It would be funded by sales tax and motor vehicle excise tax revenue within a district that covered the urbanized areas east of Puget Sound between Marysville to the north and Parkland to the south. From 1960 to 1990, the region's population had increased by 82 percent and was outpaced by the growth in the number of registered vehicles, which collectively logged 55.2 million miles (88.8 million km) traveled in 1991.

=== Establishment and Sound Move ===
The formation of a regional transit authority (RTA) to create a ballot measure to implement and fund the regional transit plan required the approval of the King, Pierce, and Snohomish county councils. By July 1993, all three county councils had voted to join the RTA; the Pierce and Snohomish county councils voted unanimously in favor of joining, while the vote for Metropolitan King County Council passed by a narrow 5–4 margin. The board of directors for the Central Puget Sound Regional Transit Authority, the official name of the RTA, held its first meeting on September 17, 1993, at a former Washington State Department of Transportation office in Bellevue. The new agency was provided space on the 15th floor of the Exchange Building in Downtown Seattle by King County Metro (the successor to Metro) and began preparation of its first ballot measure.

In October 1994, the RTA Board adopted its master plan for regional transit that would be sent to county councils for ratification and placement as a ballot measure. The plan, with a construction cost of approximately $6.77 billion (equivalent to $12.7 billion in 2024 dollars), was described as the largest public works project in Seattle's history. It included 69 miles (111 km) of light rail service that would be completed within 16 years with lines that would connect Downtown Seattle to Lynnwood in the north, Bellevue and Redmond to the east, and Tacoma to the south. The plan also called for a shorter timeline to launch a commuter rail system, which would use an existing 81 miles (130 km) of freight tracks from Lakewood to Everett, and an express bus network with eight routes. It was approved by the three county councils by December, with the divided Snohomish County Council narrowly voting 3–2 in favor due to the lack of light rail service to Everett in the first phase of the plan. A $2.5 million (equivalent to $4.69 million in 2024 dollars) demonstration of commuter rail service on the Tacoma–Seattle–Everett corridor during peak hours and for Tacoma Dome events was operated by the RTA in early 1995 as part of preparations for the ballot measure.

The RTA ballot measure would only require a simple majority to pass and was part of a special election on March 14, 1995. The proposal was supported by prominent elected officials, including incumbent governor Mike Lowry, and the "pro" campaign received funding from Boeing, Weyerhaeuser, local retailers The Bon Marché and Nordstrom, and engineering firms. The "no" campaign primarily comprised businessmen from the Eastside region led by mall developer Kemper Freeman; it argued that the plan was too expensive to construct and would not address traffic congestion. The ballot measure was rejected by 53.5 percent of voters across the district, with only King County having a majority in favor of the plan due to strong support within the city of Seattle. In Everett, 83 percent of voters rejected the ballot measure, attributed to the opposition of local elected officials due to the lack of light rail service for the city in the first phase. The defeat was also attributed to low turnout, especially among younger voters, due to the timing of the election in a non-presidential year.

The regional transit plan had cost $50 million (equivalent to $93.7 million in 2024 dollars) to develop under the RTA and its predecessors; calls to run a second ballot measure with a modified version of the plan found support from the county councils and the Seattle Chamber of Commerce. The RTA was reorganized to reduce its spending by 60 percent and its 150-person staff was cut to 23 members; a new CEO was hired and Snohomish County Executive Bob Drewel was elected as board chair to represent a "clean break" from earlier transit planning. A modified plan with a reduced cost of $3.9 billion (equivalent to $7.18 billion in 2024 dollars) and a 10-year timeline was presented in November 1995 by a panel of local elected officials to prepare for legislative approval for a second ballot measure. The new plan, named "Sound Move", was adopted by the RTA board in May 1996 and was placed on the November 1996 ballot; its development included over 400 public meetings to receive community input. Sound Move only included 25 miles (40 km) of light rail within Downtown Tacoma and from Downtown Seattle to Seattle–Tacoma International Airport, but retained the commuter rail element of the previous plan and expanded its use of express buses.

On November 5, 1996, the Sound Move plan and its funding package was approved by 56.5 percent of voters within the RTA district. It won a majority in all three counties and was approved by 70 percent of Seattle voters. The "yes" campaign, largely supported by the same donors as well as smaller contributors, used wider advertisements and grassroots teams; the "no" campaign repeated their criticisms of the plan on fiscal grounds and raised its funds from real estate interests and lobbying groups representing the trucking, homebuilding, and road construction industries. The local funding for the plan would be raised through a 0.4 percent sales tax and 0.3 percent annual motor vehicle excise tax that took effect on April 1, 1997. The RTA began expanding its staff and moved out of its shared space with Metro in July 1997; its new headquarters occupied several floors at 1100 Second Avenue, a former bank building in Downtown Seattle. The agency moved its offices to Seattle's historic Union Station in November 1999 after a renovation and restoration project that cost $23.5 million (equivalent to $41.5 million in 2024 dollars).

=== Launch of first services ===
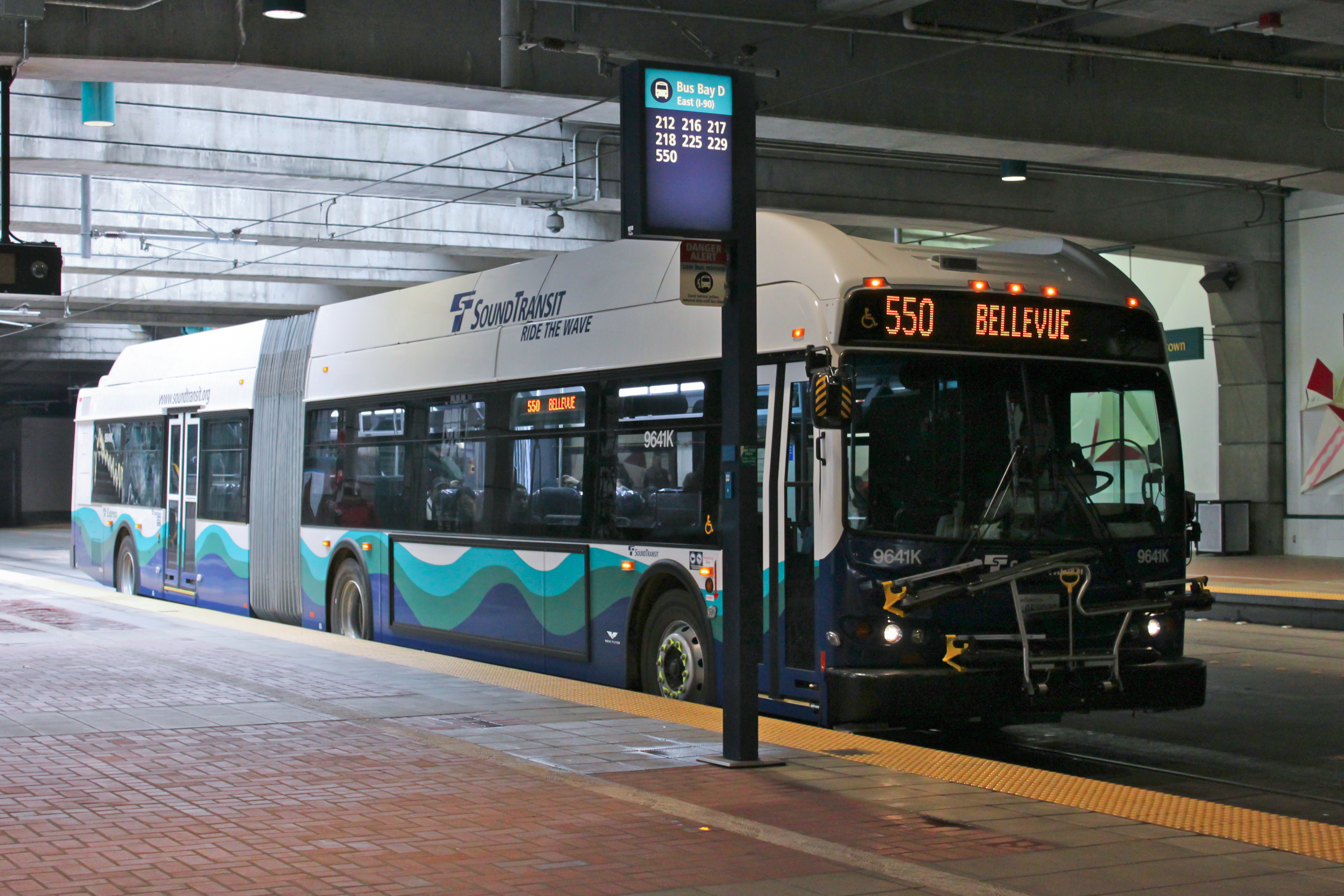
A Sound Transit Express bus on route 550 in the Downtown Seattle Transit Tunnel

Sound Transit was adopted as the brand name for the RTA on August 15, 1997, along with the names "Link" for the light rail system, "Sounder" for the commuter rail system, and "Regional Express" for the bus network. The "Sound Transit" name was chosen due to its use as a double entendre, referring to the Puget Sound region as well as appearing "trustworthy" and "solid". Over 100 names were suggested by consultants and members of the public to the RTA board; the other finalist for the agency's name was "Regional Transit", which went through several rounds of voting. The agency's logo, created by a local firm and described as a "heavyset T with an S winding through it", was approved in September by the board. Sound Transit approved funding for its first projects the following month by partnering with local transit agencies; Pierce Transit received funding for 15 additional daily trips on its Seattle–Tacoma express buses, while construction of Community Transit's park and ride at Ash Way in Lynnwood would be accelerated with new regional funds.

The first component of the Sound Move plan to be fully implemented was the regional express bus system, which was later renamed to Sound Transit Express and approved in late 1998. The first set of nine express bus routes launched on September 19, 1999, and served regional destinations and 33 park and ride lots in the three counties; an existing King County Metro express route from Seattle to Bellevue and Pierce Transit's Seattle–Tacoma express were also transferred to Sound Transit. The initial fleet of 117 buses were painted in the agency's new livery and included low-floor articulated buses, high-floor coaches, and 20 dual-mode Breda buses leased from King County Metro for use in the Downtown Seattle Transit Tunnel. The express buses accepted the PugetPass, a new inter-agency fare system that replaced commuter passes and was accepted by five regional transit agencies when it launched on September 1, 1999.

The Sounder commuter rail system was originally scheduled to debut with nine daily round trips between Seattle and Tacoma in December 1999, but state funding for track improvements had been jeopardized by the Tim Eyman-led Initiative 695, which capped the state's portion of the motor vehicle excise tax at $30. The initiative was passed in November 1999 and later ruled unconstitutional by the Washington Supreme Court, but the cap was passed by the state legislature; the state's withdrawn funding was filled by an allocation of federal transportation funds allocated by the Puget Sound Regional Council. Sound Transit had reached an agreement with the Port of Seattle, Port of Tacoma, and railroad owners BNSF and Union Pacific in April 1999 for use of their tracks, contingent on funding the majority of a $319 million improvement project for the Seattle–Tacoma corridor. A new, 40-year agreement was signed with BNSF in April 2000 for the railroad to operate the commuter rail system with its crews for an annual cost of $4 million in 2000 dollars (equivalent to $6.9 million in 2024 dollars).

Sounder trains on the South Line (now the S Line) began service on September 18, 2000, with two round trips from Tacoma to Seattle with intermediate stops at Sumner and Auburn stations. An estimated 657 people rode the morning trains, while 451 rode in the evening. The service used a temporary platform due to a dispute with Tacoma Rail, which owned the tracks leading to the intermodal Tacoma Dome Station hub; the dispute also limited the number of daily trips for trains until an agreement was signed in November 2000. Additional stations were completed and opened by March 2001 to bring the line to seven stations as originally approved in Sound Move; the platform at Tacoma Dome Station opened on September 15, 2003. The initial rollout of the 19 planned Sound Transit Express routes was completed in September 2002 with the launch of the Seattle–Woodinville and Tacoma–University District routes. The bus fleet had grown to 194 vehicles and the service had carried 15 million passengers in its first three years of operation. By 2005, Sound Transit had constructed several direct access ramps between bus hubs and HOV lanes on freeways, along with a total of 10,000 stalls at park and ride lots.

=== Light rail planning and financial issues ===
In November 1999, Sound Transit selected its preferred route for the 24-mile (39 km) Central Link corridor between Northgate Transit Center in Seattle and Seattle–Tacoma International Airport, which included a surface section in the Rainier Valley area. The 21-mile (34 km) section from the University District to the airport, which had been identified as the initial segment in Sound Move, was estimated to cost $1.85 billion (equivalent to $3.27 billion in 2024 dollars). The figure exceeded the original budget for the project in Sound Move because of overruns attributed to new elements as well as increased land prices. Construction of the section between Northgate and the University District was contingent on receiving additional funding from the federal government, which had appropriated large grants in the 1990s but was beginning to reduce its funding for new transit projects. Earlier meetings had criticized the use of surface sections through Tukwila and the Rainier Valley, where a more expensive tunnel was rejected, due to their potential effects on displacement and travel time.

The Central Link route included a 4.5-mile (7.2 km) tunnel between Downtown Seattle and the University District with intermediate stations on First Hill and Capitol Hill that crossed under Portage Bay. The original budget for the tunnel was $557 million (equivalent to $961 million in 2024 dollars), but Sound Transit's selected contractor produced a low bid that was $171 million higher (equivalent to $295 million in 2024 dollars) than expected. The area's poor soils and other changes to the design led to a $680 million increase (equivalent to $1.17 billion in 2024 dollars) in the estimated cost of the project, which drew criticism from local media and elected officials. The Federal Transit Administration (FTA) had previously agreed to a $500 million grant (equivalent to $863 million in 2024 dollars) for the tunnel section based on the previous cost figures, but informed Sound Transit that major design changes would require a new agreement. The full agreement was signed by the U.S. Secretary of Transportation shortly before he left office with the rest of the Clinton administration, but it did not guarantee appropriations for the project would continue.

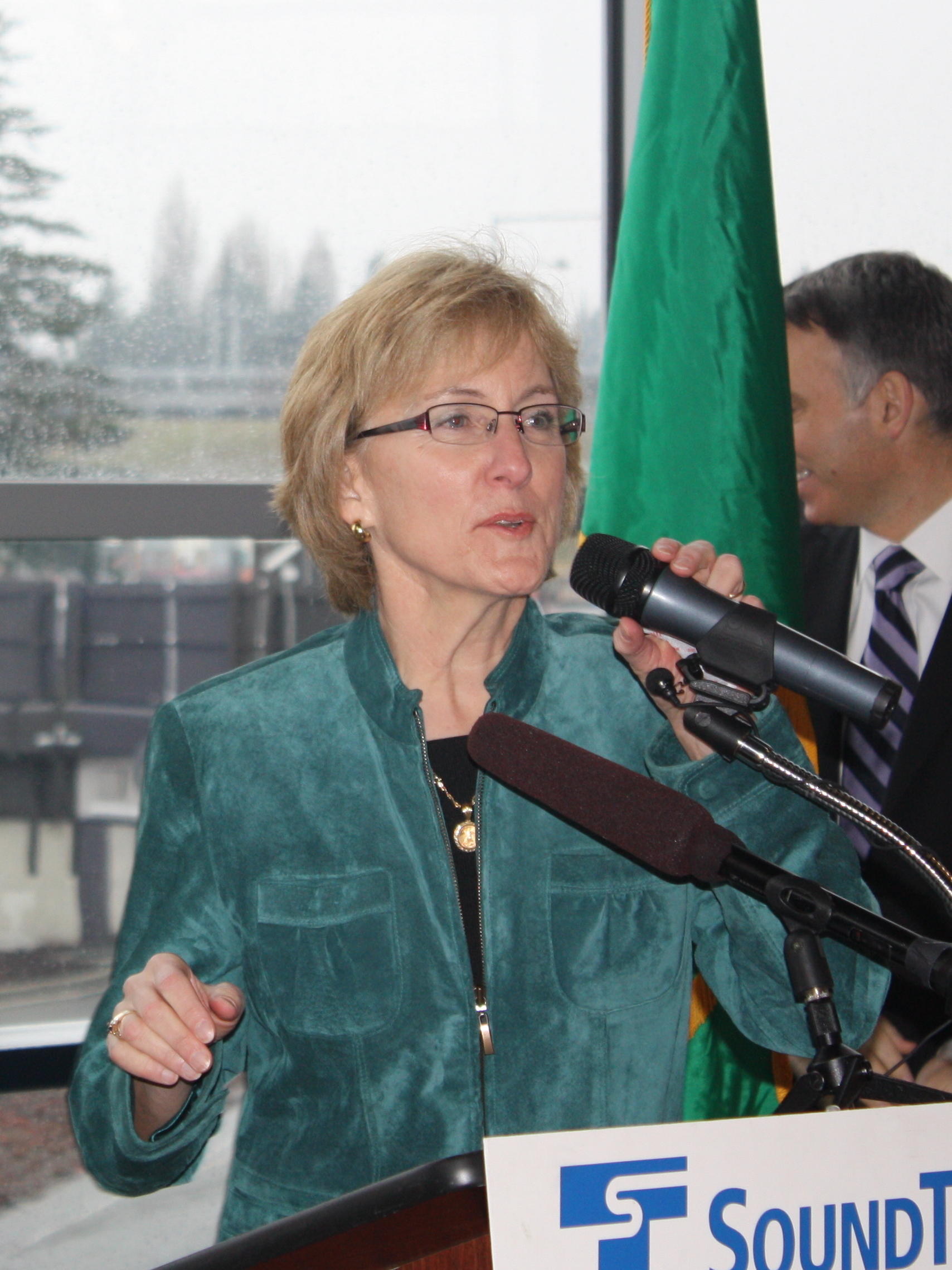
Joni Earl (pictured in 2009) was the chief executive officer of Sound Transit from 2001 to 2014

In January 2001, the new chair of the U.S. House Appropriations Subcommittee on Transportation called for an audit of Sound Transit's finances to be conducted by the inspector general of the U.S. Department of Transportation before allowing for further federal grants on the light rail project. A private audit commissioned by Sound Transit determined that the agency's financial estimates had been "overly optimistic", lacked adequate contingencies, and were drawn from insufficient data. Eight different citizens' groups called for various solutions to replace or dissolve the agency; among them were a new referendum, replacement of light rail with the planned city monorail network, or a fare-free bus system endorsed by two former Washington governors. CEO Bob White resigned and was replaced by Joni Earl, previously chief operating officer; she is credited with salvaging the light rail project and restoring public trust in Sound Transit. Earl, an accountant who had little transit experience but was a city manager and deputy county executive under Drewel, sought to make the agency more transparent and produce a more realistic budget for its projects.

The inspector general's interim report, released in April 2001, criticized the FTA and Sound Transit for advancing in the grant review process without having a firm cost estimate, which had changed several times due to modifications to the preferred project. It recommended that federal funding for the project be withheld; new Transportation Secretary Norman Mineta then announced a hold on releasing funds from the federal earmark, which would not be redistributed while Sound Transit resubmitted its plans. The editorial board of The Seattle Times published a call to pull the plug on the Link light rail project, while the cost overruns drew negative comparisons to the Big Dig project in Boston. The city's other daily newspaper, the Post-Intelligencer, alleged that the Sound Move budget had concealed $350 million in contingency funds (equivalent to $590 million in 2024 dollars) to reduce the estimated cost of light rail, similar to a criminal case of securities fraud uncovered in the Big Dig megaproject. After Sound Transit officials presented their evidence to the P-I editorial team, the story was retracted and a correction was published on the front page.

A shortened, 14-mile (23 km) version of the Central Link project between Tukwila and Downtown Seattle was proposed as the initial operating segment for the network; it would cost $2.1 billion (equivalent to $3.54 billion in 2024 dollars) to construct under the revised budget estimates but would not reach Sea–Tac Airport. The revised plan, with a completion date set for 2009, was approved by the Sound Transit Board in September 2001 and formally adopted two months later by a 14–2 vote. The change in the project's scope from the original Sound Move plan was challenged in a lawsuit filed in February 2002 by an opposition group funded by Kemper Freeman; a county court ruled in favor of Sound Transit and the decision was later upheld by the State Supreme Court. A new grant application for the project's federal funding was submitted in July 2002 and final design began the following month with the FTA's approval. The inspector general's second investigation of Sound Transit took ten months and was completed in July 2003; the report concluded that the agency had resolved its financial auditing issues and outstanding questions about rail–bus interoperability in the Downtown Seattle Transit Tunnel, among other issues. The full federal grant agreement was reinstated in October 2003 and construction of Central Link began a month later.

=== Service expansion and ST2 plans ===
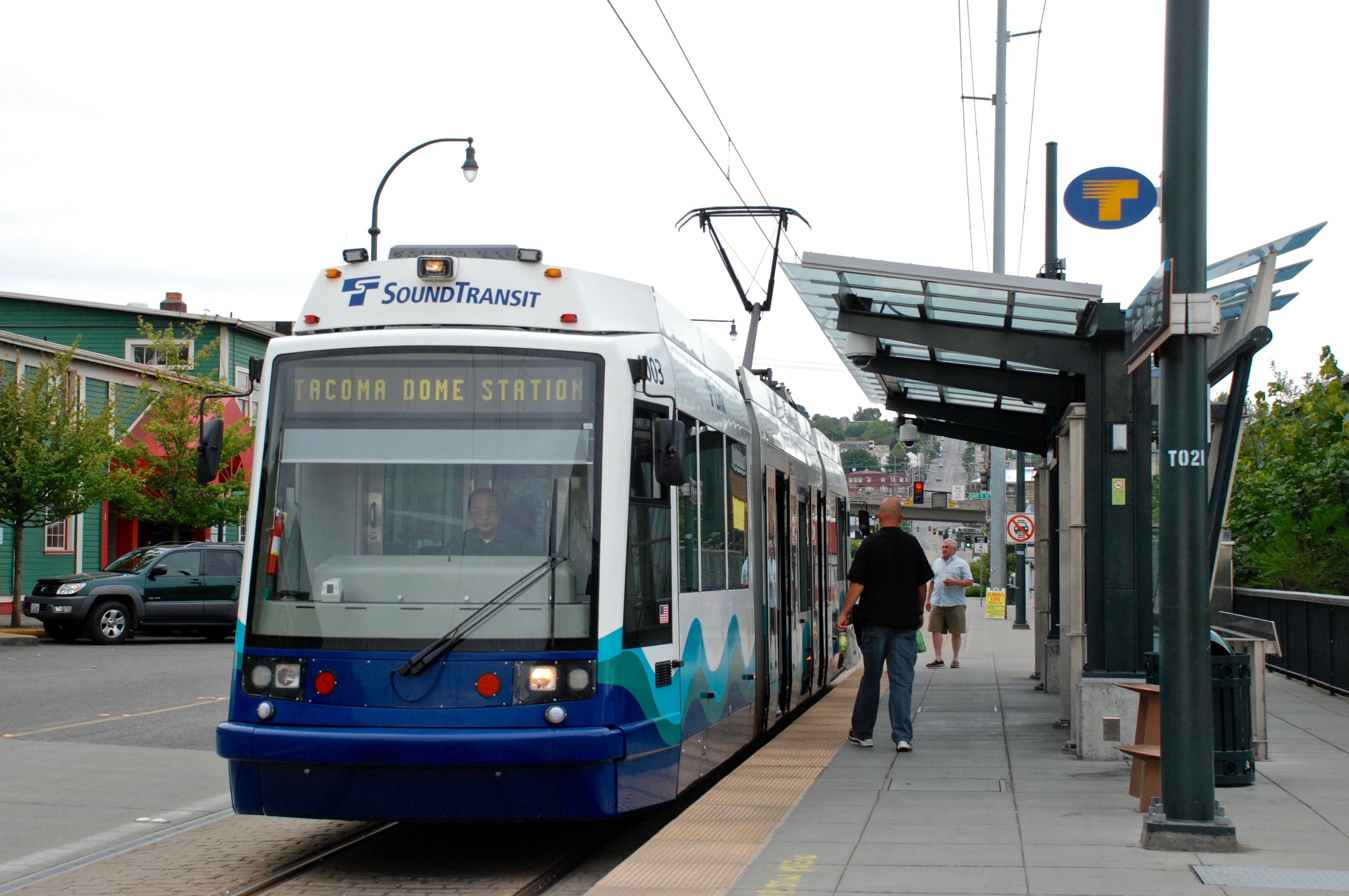
The first light rail line in the region, Tacoma Link, opened in August 2003

The first section of the Link light rail system to be constructed was Tacoma Link (now the T Line), a local streetcar that connects Tacoma Dome Station to Downtown Tacoma. The 1.6-mile (2.6 km) line opened on August 22, 2003, and cost $80.4 million (equivalent to $131 million in 2024 dollars) to construct over a three-year period. A second commuter rail line for Sounder, the North Line (now the N Line), began service on December 21, 2003, and extended the network north from Seattle to Edmonds and Everett. Earlier that month, Sound Transit signed a 97-year lease of the track rights with BNSF for $258 million (equivalent to $420 million in 2024 dollars); the agreement also included acquisition of the Lakeview Subdivision for an extension of the South Line to Lakewood.

Sound Transit began forming its long-range plan in 2004, which would include a new funding package for the remainder of Central Link as well as other projects to expand the rail and bus network. A total of 81 projects were included in the adopted plan, including near-term light rail extensions to the Eastside via Interstate 90, north to Lynnwood, and south to Tacoma. The northern tunneled section of the original Central Link route was divided into two new projects in 2005: University Link from Downtown Seattle to Capitol Hill and the Montlake area; and North Link (later Northgate Link) from Montlake to the University District and Northgate. The routing for University Link avoided the Portage Bay crossing but also eliminated a station on First Hill, which had been deemed a risk to securing federal funding. To serve the neighborhood, Sound Transit offered to include the First Hill Streetcar project in its next transit package.

The second phase of the regional transit plan, a 20-year program named Sound Transit 2 (ST2), was adopted by the Sound Transit Board in May 2007. It would cost $10.8 billion in 2006 dollars (equivalent to $16.1 billion in 2024 dollars) and include 50 miles (80 km) of light rail expansion, the First Hill Streetcar, and planning for further expansions to be built with outside funding. ST2 was one component of the joint Roads and Transit ballot measure, which also included $7 billion (equivalent to $10.2 billion in 2024 dollars) in highway and road projects proposed by the Regional Transportation Investment District (RTID), which included areas in the three counties beyond the Sound Transit district. The RTID had previously proposed a joint ballot measure for the November 2004; a 2006 bill passed by the state legislature required both issues to be on the same ballot, but allowed them to run separately. The joint package—the largest tax proposal in the state's history—was opposed by Kemper Freeman on financial grounds and the local Sierra Club chapter for its road expansions; the proposal also found little support among major political figures and opposition from some, including King County Executive and former Sound Transit Board chair Ron Sims. On November 6, 2007, the Roads and Transit package (officially Proposition 1) was rejected by 56 percent of voters in the three-county region; a post-election survey commissioned by Sound Transit found that most respondents were uncertain of the package's costs and tax impacts or were opposed to the high cost. In response to the failure of Roads and Transit, a bill to expand Sound Transit into a regional transportation agency that was also responsible for highway development was proposed in the state legislature but died in the 2008 session.

A standalone ballot measure for ST2 was proposed for the 2008 or 2010 elections, the latter after the scheduled completion of Central Link in Seattle. Ridership on Sound Transit services grew by 25 percent from July 2007 to July 2008 amid a national increase in transit ridership driven by higher gasoline prices. The increase in ridership and favorable political environment led to a push to prepare the ST2 ballot measure for the November 2008 election, which was expected to have greater turnout due to the concurrent presidential election. In July, the Sound Transit Board voted to place a 15-year version of the ST2 package on the November ballot; its cost was reduced to $17.9 billion (equivalent to $25.5 billion in 2024 dollars) and would require a 0.5 percent sales tax increase. The plan included 34 miles (55 km) of light rail extensions that would reach Lynnwood, the Microsoft campus in Redmond, and northern Federal Way by 2023. It also retained the First Hill Streetcar and funded additional Sounder and Sound Transit Express service in the near-term to address crowding. On November 4, 2008, Proposition 1 (which authorized the ST2 plan) was approved by 58 percent of voters despite the ongoing economic crisis. The "pro" campaign raised nearly $1 million in funds (equivalent to $1.43 million in 2024 dollars) over a four-month period and used targeted campaigning to improve turnout among young voters.

=== Link opening and early ST2 projects ===
The initial 14 miles (23 km) of Central Link (now the 1 Line) opened to passengers on July 18, 2009, between Westlake station in Downtown Seattle to the north and Tukwila International Boulevard station to the south. The Downtown Seattle Transit Tunnel, which underwent a two-year renovation to prepare for light rail service, became the only tunnel in the U.S. to have stations shared between buses and trains. The construction cost was $117 million (equivalent to $166 million in 2024 dollars) below the $2.44 billion budget (equivalent to $3.46 billion in 2024 dollars) set by Sound Transit in 2003. An extension from Tukwila to Sea–Tac Airport opened on December 19 and cost $244 million to construct (equivalent to $346 million in 2024 dollars)—financed primarily through bonds. By September 2009, Sound Transit's services had carried over 100 million total passengers, of which 82 million were on its network of 26 express bus routes on 21 corridors. The ORCA card, a smart card system for seven of the region's transit agencies, debuted in April 2009 and replaced Sound Transit's paper transfer tickets and PugetPass monthly passes on January 1, 2010.

The first service expansion using ST2 funds was rolled out beginning in May 2009, with additional trips for twelve bus routes and a ninth daily round-trip on the Sounder South Line. Sound Transit's primary revenue sources, sales tax and the motor vehicle excise tax, began to decline in late 2008 as a result of the ongoing economic recession. By late 2010, the agency expected that it would have a shortfall of $3.9 billion (equivalent to $5.46 billion in 2024 dollars) through the lifetime of the ST2 program, approximately 25 percent of forecasted revenue. In response, several Sounder projects and a portion of the light rail extension to Federal Way were cut from the ST2 program or given a lower priority rating, as was preliminary engineering for other projects. The start of University Link construction was unaffected by the cuts, as it had already been budgeted and received federal funding, while planning for the Eastside's light rail extension stalled over disagreements over the routing in Bellevue. Ridership on Sounder and Sound Transit Express declined slightly from 2009 to 2010, while Link light rail fell short of its projections; weekend and late-night trips on Central Link were also reduced to one railcar to save on operating costs.

To cover increased operating costs, Sound Transit Express fares were increased twice over a two-year period and several routes or sections with low weekend ridership were cut or combined in June 2011. The agency also opened new bus hubs in Kirkland and Mountlake Terrace, where a freeway station was constructed in the median of Interstate 5. The first infill rail station constructed by Sound Transit, at Commerce Street on Tacoma Link, opened in September of that year. The Sounder South Line was extended 8.5 miles (13.7 km) from Tacoma to Lakewood on October 8, 2012, at a cost of $325 million (equivalent to $438 million in 2024 dollars) and completed the original commuter rail network from the 1996 plan. The Lakewood extension used the northern section of the Point Defiance Bypass, a 14.5-mile (23.3 km) corridor owned by Sound Transit and designated for use by intercity Amtrak trains. It was rebuilt at a cost of $181 million (equivalent to $227 million in 2024 dollars), primarily funded by the state and federal governments. On December 18, 2017, the first Amtrak Cascades trip on the new corridor derailed on a bridge over Interstate 5 near DuPont; three passengers were killed and dozens of people were injured. The National Transportation Safety Board determined the causes of derailment to be the lack of positive train control and a hazardous curve that was not replaced due to budget issues; Sound Transit was criticized for not mitigating for both issues, while WSDOT and Amtrak were blamed for inadequate training through the curve. Amtrak service on the corridor resumed in November 2021 following the activation of positive train control and speed reductions.

Ridership on the agency's services reached a new record high in 2012, with 28 million total boardings and an average of 93,000 passengers on weekdays. Sound Transit began construction of the Northgate Link Extension, which was deferred from Sound Move and funded by ST2, in August 2012. The agency extended Sound Transit Express service outside of its district into Olympia in 2013 as part of a four-year pilot project funded by Intercity Transit, the local transit operator in Thurston County. The route of the Eastside light rail line, under the project name East Link, was approved in April 2013 alongside additional funding from the Bellevue city government to cover the costs of a downtown tunnel. The line would use the Interstate 90 express lanes on the Homer M. Hadley Memorial Bridge and become the first permanent railway on a floating bridge; design tests were conducted using a two-car trainset on a model of the proposed transitions between the bridge's fixed and floating spans. An elevated extension of Central Link from Sea–Tac Airport to South 200th Street station (now Angle Lake) also began construction in April 2013; it was the first design–build project for the agency and was funded by ST2 and federal grants to accelerate planning by four years from the rest of the deferred Federal Way Link Extension. In 2015, Sound Transit introduced its first double-decker buses to increase capacity on the Seattle–Everett corridor and other Snohomish County routes operated by Community Transit, which already had its own double-decker fleet.

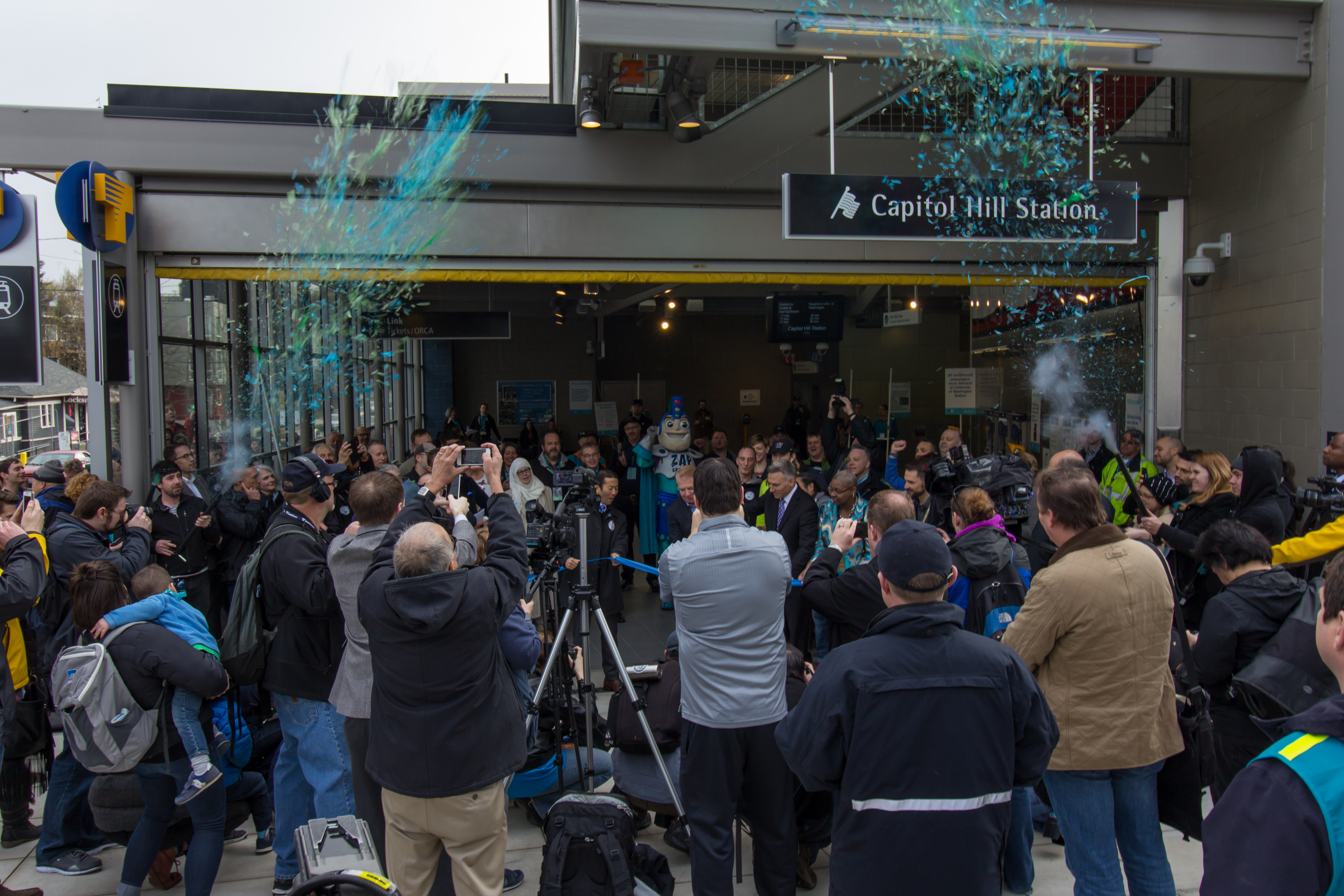
The opening ceremonies for Capitol Hill station on the University Link Extension took place on March 19, 2016.

Central Link service was extended to Capitol Hill and the University of Washington campus on March 19, 2016, via a 3.15-mile (5.07 km) tunnel that cost $1.9 billion to construct (equivalent to $2.43 billion in 2024 dollars) and was completed six months ahead of schedule. The 1.6-mile (2.6 km) southern extension to Angle Lake station opened on September 24 and was completed at a cost of $343 million (equivalent to $438 million in 2024 dollars), below its original budget. The First Hill Streetcar, funded by Sound Transit and built as part of the Seattle Streetcar network, opened two months earlier after a delay due in manufacturing streetcars with electric batteries. By late 2016, Light rail ridership reached a daily average of 66,203 weekday passengers—an increase of 89 percent from late 2015—and necessitated the use of four-car trainsets. The agency carried 47 million total passengers across all of its modes in 2017, with growth in its rail services and a slight decline in express buses. The Downtown Seattle Transit Tunnel was fully transitioned to light rail use in March 2019 following the closure of the northern bus entrance; the tunnel's ownership was transferred to Sound Transit in October 2022 after the agency completed $87 million in debt payments to King County Metro.

=== Sound Transit 3 ===
The ST2 package included funds to produce studies on future transit projects for a potential third expansion package that would be known as Sound Transit 3 (ST3). Studies of alternatives were launched in 2013 for several corridors, including a joint study with the Seattle Department of Transportation for the Downtown Seattle–Ballard corridor. Sound Transit proposed a $15 billion package to fund a pool of projects that were identified in an updated long-range plan adopted in December 2014, including deferred projects from Sound Move and ST2. In July 2015, the state legislature approved a transportation spending package that included the agency's request to authorize a new set of taxes—including a property tax—pending voter approval of ST3 in the November 2016 election.

Long-time Sound Transit CEO Joni Earl went on medical leave in April 2014 following a brain injury and was replaced in the interim while a national search for a replacement was conducted. Former FTA administrator Peter Rogoff was hired as the agency's new CEO in January 2016, while Earl was retained as CEO emeritus until the March opening of University Link, when she originally planned to retire. The initial list of 70 candidate projects for ST3 was reduced to a priority list for the draft of the plan, which was released in March 2016. The draft plan proposed a 25-year program that would open new transit projects from 2028 to 2041 that would include all modes and ultimately extend Link light rail to a 108-mile (174 km) network from Everett to Tacoma. It was estimated to cost a total of $50 billion over its lifetime, consisting of $27 billion in new tax revenue alongside federal bonds and existing taxes and bonds.

The final ST3 plan was approved by the Sound Transit Board in June 2016 following several changes from the draft plan, including the addition of $4 billion in bond capacity to accelerate the timeline for some projects and bring the total package to $53.8 billion. It included the addition of 62 miles (100 km) to Link light rail with a network stretching to Everett in the north, Issaquah to the east, and Tacoma to the south; a bus rapid transit network on Interstate 405 and State Route 522; and capacity improvements to the Sounder South Line with an extension to DuPont. On November 8, 2016, the ST3 ballot measure was approved by 54 percent of voters in the three-county district; it passed with a majority in King and Snohomish counties, but not in Pierce County. An attempt to restrict the motor vehicle excise tax collected for ST3 to $30 was launched by Tim Eyman and passed in 2019 as Initiative 976, which was later ruled unconstitutional by the Washington Supreme Court.

In September 2019, Sound Transit announced plans to rename its services to use colors in preparation for the launch of more Link light rail lines; the existing Central Link would become the Red Line, while Tacoma Link became the Orange Line and East Link would become the Blue Line when it opened. The agency withdrew this plan after criticism from political groups for the use of the name "Red Line", which ran through areas where redlining had been historically practiced. A new naming system based on numbers was announced in April 2020, with Central Link instead being renamed the 1 Line. The first ST3 projects to begin construction were the Downtown Redmond extension to East Link and the Federal Way Link Extension, which both were mostly deferred but had preliminary engineering funded by ST2. In 2020, Link became the first light rail system in the U.S. to run entirely on renewable energy after Sound Transit enrolled in a direct purchase program for wind power from Puget Sound Energy to supplement its hydroelectricity from Seattle City Light.

=== COVID-19 pandemic and ST2 openings ===
The local onset of the COVID-19 pandemic in early 2020 led to a 67 percent decline in Sound Transit ridership by mid-March after remote work policies were enacted by major employers in the Seattle area. The agency halted its fare collection and enforcement for several months and reduced service in response to the decline in ridership and lack of available staff during the beginning of state-mandated lockdown measures. In April, Link service was reduced to a frequency of every 20 minutes, several Sounder trips were suspended, and some Sound Transit Express routes were temporarily cancelled; by the following month, total ridership on the agency's services had declined 85 percent to an average of 21,000 weekday passengers. Sound Transit also suspended most of its work on active construction projects until May due to the inability to meet public health guidelines on social distancing. Normal frequencies on Link were restored in June 2021, shortly before capacity limits set by the state government were lifted. Some Sound Transit Express routes returned to normal service, while others remained suspended through 2022 due to a shortage of bus drivers.

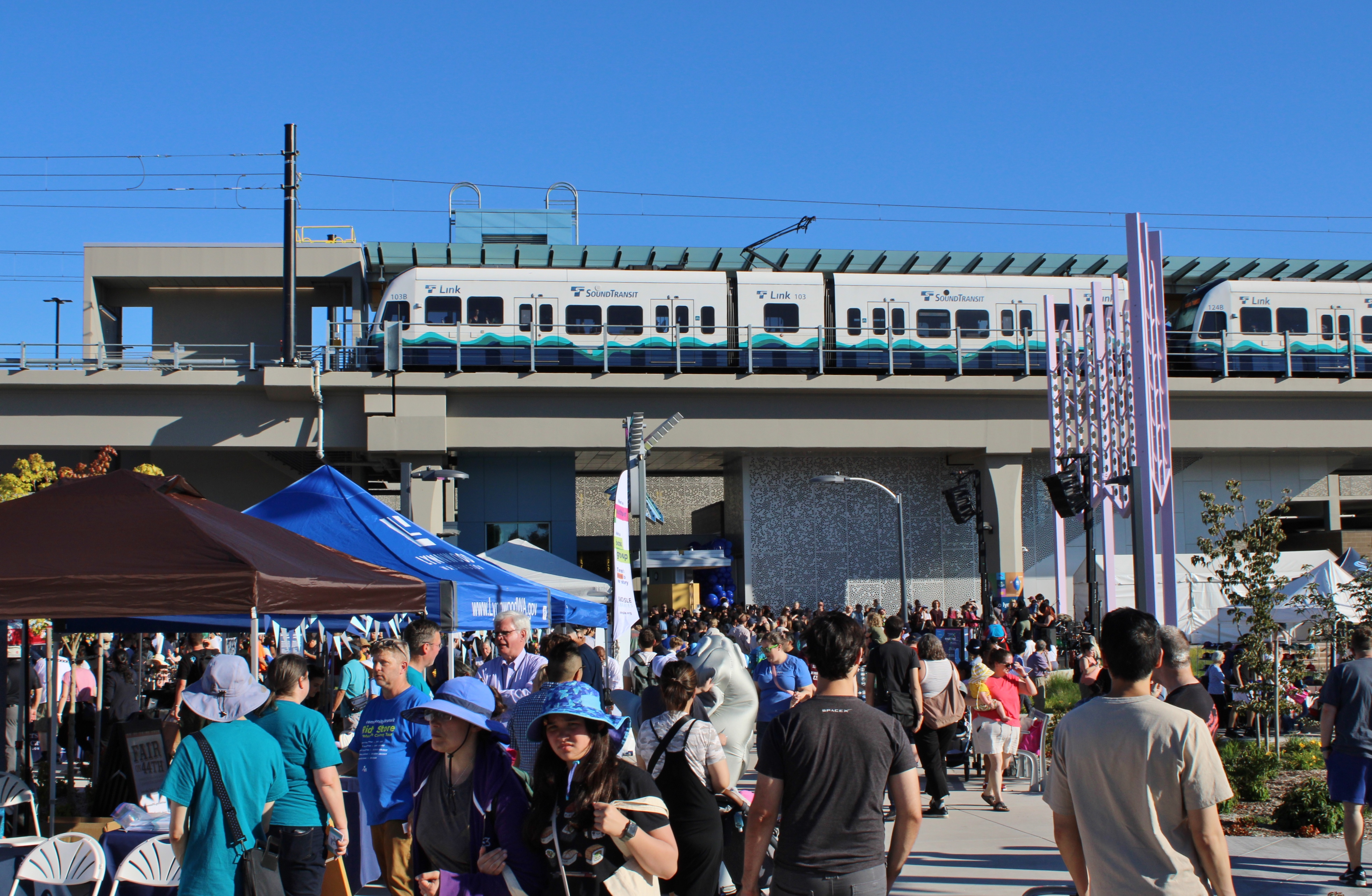
Lynnwood City Center station on its opening day in 2024

Light rail service on the 1 Line in Seattle was extended north by three stations from the University District to Northgate on October 2, 2021. The majority of the 4.3-mile (6.9 km) extension is tunneled and the $1.9 billion construction cost was funded by ST2. The new stations drove an increase in Link ridership above its pre-pandemic figures, reaching over 80,000 daily boardings by 2023, despite the slower recovery for ridership at downtown stations. The system also set several one-day ridership records in July 2023 due to special events in Seattle, reaching 136,800 passengers on July 23. Tacoma Link, now renamed the T Line, doubled in length to over 4 miles (6.4 km) with the opening of an extension to the Stadium District and Hilltop neighborhoods on September 16, 2023. The project was delayed by a year and cost $65 million more than its original ST2 budget due to issues with relocating underground utilities during construction.

The 2 Line, formerly named East Link, was originally scheduled to open from Seattle to western Redmond in 2023, but was delayed a year by construction issues and a four-month strike by concrete delivery drivers. The $3.7 billion project is the most expensive section of the ST2 package and had already been delayed three years due to disputes during its planning process. The opening of the 14-mile (23 km) line was split into two phases to allow for the completed section between South Bellevue and Redmond Technology stations to be used by passengers. The initial section between Bellevue and Redmond opened on April 27, 2024, and an extension to Downtown Redmond station followed on May 10, 2025. The western section of the 2 Line, which uses the Interstate 90 floating bridge, opened on March 28, 2026, after 5,400 defective concrete plinths under the rails were replaced.

The 1 Line was extended 8.5 miles (13.7 km) from Northgate into Snohomish County on August 30, 2024, with the opening of four stations in Shoreline, Mountlake Terrace, and Lynnwood. The opening of the Lynnwood Link Extension increased daily ridership on the 1 Line to an average of 90,000 on weekdays in November despite reliability issues that led to major service disruptions by the end of 2024. The Federal Way Link Extension, which extend the 1 Line south by 7.8 miles (12.6 km) from Angle Lake to Federal Way, opened on December 6, 2025. The design–build project was delayed two years by the need to construct an unplanned bridge over weak soil that had been revealed by a landslide during slope stabilization work. Sound Transit's first night bus route launched in March 2026 between Downtown Seattle to Seattle–Tacoma International Airport to serve passenger during hours when light rail service is unavailable. It was then expanded into two routes that serve of the 1 Line and 2 Line stations as well as other destinations in King and Pierce counties. An infill station at Pinehurst in north Seattle opened on September 30, 2026.

== Organization ==
=== Management ===
The Central Puget Sound Regional Transit Authority is a public corporation and special-purpose district that operates under the name Sound Transit. It was established under the authority of the Washington State Legislature and is governed by Revised Code of Washington chapters 81.104 and 81.112. As of 2026, the agency has 1,914 full-time employees who are organized into five operational departments and several offices in a separate executive department. Since April 2025, the chief executive officer (CEO) of Sound Transit has been Dow Constantine, who had resigned as King County Executive to take the position. He is the sixth permanent CEO in the agency's history and the first full-time appointment to the position since the resignation of Julie Timm in January 2024.

The agency has three oversight committees that are filled by citizens from the Sound Transit district. The Citizen Oversight Panel oversees compliance with board policies and financial plans, and is composed of 15 members serving four-year terms after their appointment by the board of directors. The Diversity Oversight Committee promotes employment and contracting opportunities for underprivileged groups and includes members representing community organizations and business organizations. The Citizens Accessibility Advisory Committee has 15 members who represent passengers with disabilities, mobility issues, or are senior citizens. The advisory committee monitors the agency's compliance with the Americans with Disabilities Act and other accessibility requirements.

=== Board of directors ===
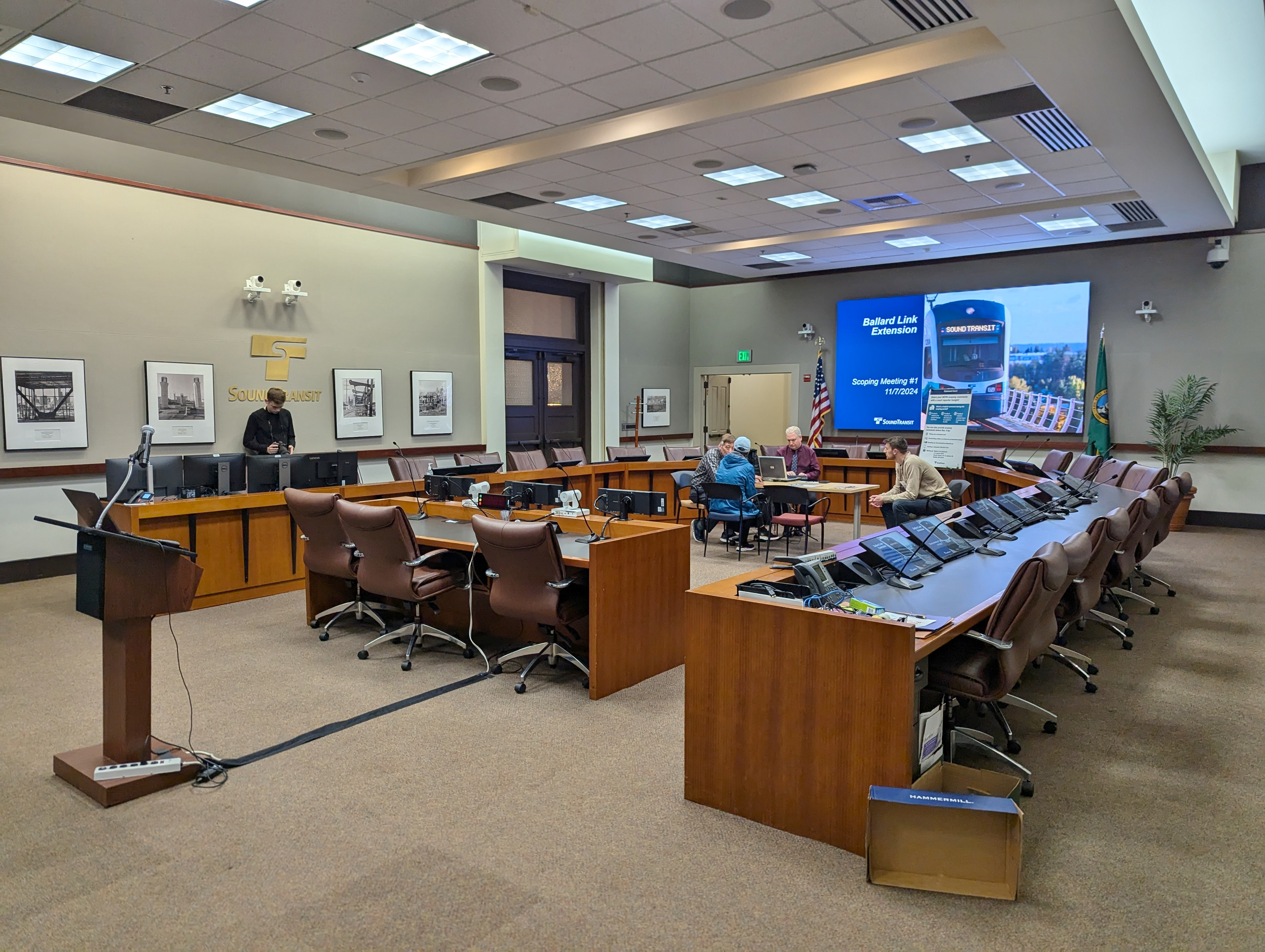
The Ruth Fisher Board Room at Union Station

Sound Transit is governed by a board of directors with 18 members who are appointed based on their positions in regional and local governments. One seat is held by the Washington State Secretary of Transportation, while the remaining seventeen are local elected positions appointed by the county executives of King, Pierce, and Snohomish counties, with approval of the respective county councils. The only fixed positions among these appointments are the county executives themselves and representatives from the largest city in each of the three counties; other positions are filled by representatives from other cities or unincorporated areas. Major decisions, including annexations, system plans, and the annual budget, require a two-thirds majority of boardmembers.

The board has ten members from King County, four from Pierce County, and three from Snohomish County. The seats were allocated proportional to their population within the Sound Transit district in 1994, with each seat representing approximately 145,000 people at the time. Sound Transit is authorized to expand its board to up to 25 members and adjust the allocation between the counties based on the results of the decennial census. A bill to require board seats to be directly elected from within 11 districts was passed by the Washington State Senate in 2017 but was not considered by the House Transportation Committee. In 2019, Sound Transit added a non-voting seat for a labor liaison that is recommended by labor organizations and appointed to a four-year term.

The agency's policies are set by the board through their decisions, including maintenance of the long-range plan, budget, and project details. The full board meets at the Ruth Fisher Board Room in Union Station on the fourth Thursday of the month; their meetings are open to the public and streamed online. The board selects a chair and two vice chairs to serve two-year terms and also assign members to four committees: the executive committee, Rider Experience and Operations, System Expansion, and Finance and Audit. In the event that the chair or vice chairs leave office or are otherwise unable to serve their full term, the vacancy can be filled by another member for the remainder of the term.

Sound Transit Board members, as of 2026
Member	Position	County
Dave Somers (chair)	Snohomish County Executive	Snohomish
Claudia Balducci (vice chair)	Councilmember, King County	King
Ryan Mello (vice chair)	Pierce County Executive	Pierce
Angela Birney	Mayor, City of Redmond	King
Steffanie Fain	Councilmember, King County	King
Cassie Franklin	Mayor, City of Everett	Snohomish
Thomas McLeod	Mayor, City of Tukwila	King
Hunter T. George	Councilmember, City of Fircrest	Pierce
Katie Wilson	Mayor, City of Seattle	King
Julie Meredith	Washington Secretary of Transportation	—
David Parshall	Councilmember, City of Lynnwood	Snohomish
Ed Prince	Councilmember, City of Renton	King
Teresa Mosqueda	Councilmember, King County	King
Kim Roscoe	Mayor, City of Fife	Pierce
Dan Strauss	Councilmember, City of Seattle	King
Peter von Reichbauer	Councilmember, King County	King
Kristina Walker	Councilmember, City of Tacoma	Pierce
Girmay Zahilay	King County Executive	King
Lisa Bogardus	Labor Liaison (non-voting)	—

=== District and subareas ===
A map of the five subareas within the Sound Transit district

The regional transit district for Sound Transit, also known as the "RTA district", encompasses major cities and urban areas in portions of King, Pierce, and Snohomish counties. It covers 1,089 square miles (2,820 km^{2}) and includes 53 cities with a combined population of 3.49 million residents—over 40 percent of the state's population. As of 2025, the district includes approximately 89 percent of King County residents, 85 percent of Pierce County residents, and 59 percent of Snohomish County residents.

The district's boundary to the west is Puget Sound from DuPont and the Thurston County line in the south to Everett and the Snohomish River to the north. The eastern boundary generally follows the edge of the contiguous suburbs in the three-county region. It excludes several large suburban cities, such as Marysville in Snohomish County and Covington and Maple Valley in southern King County. The district is mandated by state law to include the highest-population urban growth areas in the three counties and must be adjusted to include all of a member city, including annexed areas. New areas can be annexed to the RTA district through a ballot proposition following approval from Sound Transit and consultation with affected transit agencies and governments.

For funding purposes, the Sound Transit district is divided into five subareas: Snohomish, North King, South King, East King, and Pierce. Through "subarea equity", revenue from taxes are allocated towards projects that serve and benefit residents within the subarea that they were collected in. Costs are shared for projects and services that serve multiple areas; systemwide projects and programs pool their funds from all subareas. As of 2026, the most-populous subarea is North King, which has an estimated 926,093 residents and encompasses Seattle, Shoreline, and Lake Forest Park; the smallest is South King, which has an estimated 511,280 residents.

=== Funding ===
Sound Transit's budget is primarily funded through local taxes levied within the regional transit district in the urbanized portions of King, Pierce, and Snohomish counties. These taxes, which comprise 49 percent of the total 2017–2046 budget, are composed of a 1.4 percent sales tax, a 0.8 percent motor vehicle excise tax, a 0.8 percent rental car tax, and a property tax of up to 25 cents per $1,000 in assessed value. The property tax rate is variable and can increase at a rate of up to 1 percent annually with approval from the agency's board of directors. The remaining 51 percent of revenue includes grants and bonds from the federal government, loans, interest, and passenger fares. In 2023, Sound Transit accounted for 57.7 percent of all local tax revenue collected by transit agencies in Washington state. That year, the agency earned $51.9 million from passenger fares—of which 62 percent was from Link light rail. The farebox recovery ratio for Link was 16 percent in 2023, followed by 10 percent for Sound Transit Express and 8 percent for Sounder.

The agency has had three major ballot measures that were approved by voters to fund system expansion: Sound Move (1996), Sound Transit 2 (2008), and Sound Transit 3 (2016). Planning and construction of new transit projects is anticipated to continue until 2046 under the Sound Transit 3 plan and are forecast to cost $183.9 billion in year-of-expenditure dollars. Under a provision of the state constitution, Sound Transit is limited to issuing debt that does not exceed 1.5 percent of the assessed land value within the district; the final bond payments under the program were originally scheduled for 2068. Sound Transit was granted the ability to issue 75-year bonds by the state legislature in 2025. Approximately 58 percent of the long-range budget is allocated towards capital construction, while operations and maintenance comprise up 20 percent. The 2026 budget has $3.28 billion in expenses and $3.27 billion in expected revenue, of which 68.9 percent is from local taxes. The expenses include $912.76 million for operations, $1.83 billion for capital projects, and $3.28 billion for debt service.

=== Policing and security ===
A King County Sheriff's Office patrol car in Sound Transit Police livery

Sound Transit contracts with the King County Sheriff's Office for policing services, which includes patrolling transit facilities, monitoring traffic, and responding to emergency incidents. The transit police unit of the Sheriff's Office was created in 2008 to prepare for the launch of light rail service in Seattle. As of 2024, the transit police has 65 officers out of 89 total positions. These positions are overseen by a chief and include an operation captain, patrol sergeants, officers, detectives, a crime analyst, and an explosive detection specialist with a police dog. These deputies wear Sound Transit uniforms and drive patrol cars marked with the agency's logo; a bicycling unit with seven members was created in 2024.

In addition to armed officers, Sound Transit has 550 uniformed security officers who are contracted from four private firms. The unarmed security officers patrol transit facilities and respond to incidents from a central dispatch center, but are not allowed to intervene in assaults. Sound Transit maintains a 24/7 emergency text message line and trains are equipped with emergency intercom systems. Over 700 closed-circuit television cameras onboard vehicles and at transit facilities are monitored from the agency's headquarters in Seattle.

The private security officers also conducted fare enforcement on Link light rail and Sounder commuter trains, which included a citation with a $124 fine for non-paying passengers, until the program was suspended in 2020 due to accusations of discrimination. They were replaced in 2023 by fare ambassadors who conduct checks of all riders and issue warnings in addition to citations. In the first months of the new program, 48,000 warnings were issued and the fare compliance rate had risen from an estimated 55 percent in 2023 to 84 percent in May 2024. Other uniformed staff include station agents at Sounder commuter rail stations, who provide customer service and assist passengers with disabilities; staff ambassadors for rider education and reporting; and event staff who provide customer service during special events and planned service disruptions.

== Facilities and programs ==
Sound Transit is headquartered at Union Station, a former intercity train terminal in the Chinatown–International District neighborhood of Seattle. The agency moved into the building on November 1, 1999, after it was acquired and renovated at a cost of $23.5 million. The station's former waiting room is open to the public and was named the Joni Earl Great Hall in 2017 for the agency's former CEO. Since 2009, Sound Transit has also occupied leased space in four buildings around Union Station, which is adjacent to King Street Station and the International District/Chinatown transit hub.

The system serves over 90 regional transit facilities, including 59 light rail and commuter rail stations. Sound Transit debuted an icon, named the "Regional T", in 2003 to brand multimodal transit facilities in the region. These include stations with park and ride lots and garages that regularly fill on weekdays; a daily fee is planned to be implemented in 2025 to manage demand at busy lots. Link light rail trains are maintained at three operations and maintenance facilities in Seattle, Bellevue, and Tacoma. The primary maintenance facilities for Sounder commuter rail and the Sound Transit Express bus network are leased or shared with their respective operators.

Sound Transit is one of seven transit agencies that accept fare payment through the ORCA card system, which allows for inter-agency transfers. It launched in 2009 and is administered by Sound Transit. The original system was replaced with a second-generation platform in 2022 that supports other forms of contactless payment, including credit cards and mobile payment apps. As of 2025, 81 percent of Sound Transit fares were paid using the ORCA card platform; in May 2024, the system served over 431,000 customers in the Puget Sound region across all operators.

=== Transit-oriented development ===
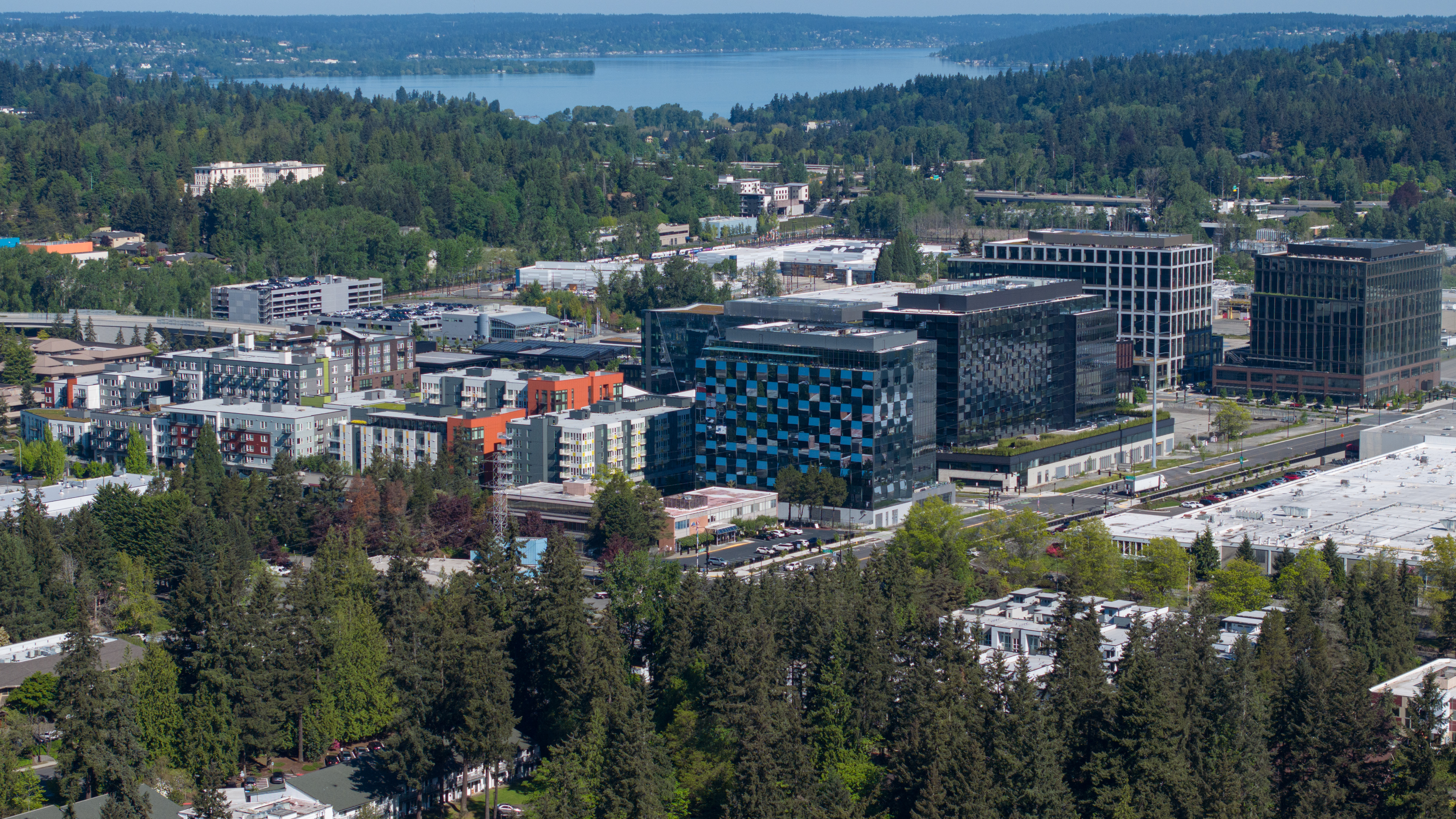
Aerial view of the Spring District, a large transit-oriented development that developed around a light rail station in Bellevue.

Several major transit-oriented development (TOD) projects were constructed around Sound Transit facilities in the 2010s and 2020s after zoning changes were approved by local governments. Among the largest projects is the Spring District, a 36-acre (15 ha) mixed-use neighborhood in Bellevue on the 2 Line that began construction in 2013. Sound Transit's first TOD project, Senior City at Federal Way Transit Center, opened in 2010 and includes 61 units of affordable housing for senior citizens. It was developed as a public–private partnership with the nonprofit Korean Women's Association on surplus land adjacent to the transit center. The Seattle Housing Authority redeveloped its Rainier Vista public housing complex into a mixed-income neighborhood after the nearby Columbia City station opened in 2009.

Beginning in 2015, new state legislation required Sound Transit to offer its surplus property from major construction projects to developers who would prioritize affordable housing. The "80–80–80 rule" in the legislation, later adopted by the agency in 2018, applied to 80 percent of surplus land around transit projects and required that developments designate 80 percent of residential units to residents who make 80 percent or less of the area median income. As of 2026, Sound Transit's TOD program had resulted in the creation of over 2,874 affordable housing units out of 3,869 constructed at 14 stations with a total value of $2.2 billion. Some of the developments also include community amenities, such as childcare facilities, medical clinics, and job-training centers.

=== Technology ===
All Sound Transit buses and trains are equipped with GPS tracking units to monitor their positions. The information is publicly available through an open data system and published under the GTFS standard used by navigation apps and other platforms. The backend servers for the OneBusAway app, originally developed by a University of Washington student in 2008, were acquired by Sound Transit in 2013; the app continues to be maintained by volunteers. In 2016, a phased rollout of cellular service in the Link light rail tunnels began. Since 2024, Sound Transit has offered 3D maps of select 1 Line stations for accessible wayfinding through the GoodMaps app. The maps were developed through LiDAR scans and include real-time directions through the use of a phone camera.

=== Artwork ===
The public art program for Sound Transit, named STart, was established in 1998 to allocate one percent of the local construction budget for artwork. By 2022, the agency's collection of artwork had grown to 170 permanent pieces—including murals, paintings, and large sculptures. STart expenditures were estimated at $54 million from 1998 to 2023. The program also includes temporary commissions for fences that surround construction sites. Sound Transit sponsors buskers to perform music at its light rail stations in Seattle and donated space at Angle Lake station for an all-ages music venue in 2023.

== Future projects ==
A public hearing for the Everett Link Extension project in 2026

The ST3 program, scheduled to last until 2046, includes 62 miles (100 km) of new light rail extensions with 37 stations, 8 miles (13 km) of additional commuter rail tracks, a bus rapid transit system, and improvements to existing facilities. The 45-mile (72 km) bus rapid transit system, named Stride, will have three lines that replace existing Sound Transit Express routes when they launch in 2027 and 2028. It will use the first battery electric buses in the Sound Transit fleet, including double-decker buses with wireless charging. The timeline for the Link extensions was pushed back in a 2021 realignment of ST3 projects in response to a $6.5 billion shortfall in forecast revenue due to revenue lost during the COVID-19 pandemic. Long timelines in selecting and approving route alignments and stations have also led to further delays for major ST3 projects, such as the Ballard and West Seattle extensions in Seattle. By 2041, the Link light rail system is planned to span a total of 116 miles (187 km) with five lines and 83 stations that serve a projected 750,000 daily passengers on weekdays. The full network will encompass 252 miles (406 km) across all modes.

== See also ==
- List of rapid transit systems
- List of rail transit systems in the United States
