= List of Washington state agencies =

Washington State government consists of more than 190 agencies, departments, and commissions.

The main administrative departments are:

- Agriculture (WSDA)
- Archaeology and Historic Preservation (DAHP)
- Commerce (COM)
- Corrections (DOC)
- Children, Youth, and Families (DCYF)
- Ecology (ECY)
- Employment Security Department (ESD)
- Washington State Technology Solutions (WaTech)
- Financial Institutions (DFI)
- Fish and Wildlife (WDFW)
- Health (DOH)
- Labor and Industries (L&I)
- Licensing (DOL)
- Washington Military Department (MIL)
- Natural Resources (DNR)
- Puget Sound Partnership
- Retirement Systems (DRS)
- Revenue (DOR)
- Services for the Blind (DSB)
- Social and Health Services (DSHS)
- Transportation (WSDOT)
- Veterans Affairs (DVA)

Others include:

- Accountancy, State Board of (WBOA)
- Administrative Hearings, Office of (OAH)
- Actuary, Office of the State (OSA)
- African-American Affairs, Washington State Commission on (CAA)
- Aging & Long Term Care of Eastern Washington (ALTCEW)
- Air National Guard (WAANG)
- Washington Apple Commission (APPLE)
- Architects, Board of Registration for (BRA)
- Army National Guard (WAARNG)
- Arts Commission, Washington State (ARTS)
- Asian Pacific American Affairs, State of Washington Commission on (CAPAA)
- Asparagus Commission (ASPAR)
- Attorney General, Office of the (ATG)
- Audit and Review Committee, Joint Legislative (JLARC)
- Auditor, Washington State (SAO)
- Aviation, Department of Transportation (DOTA)
- Bar Association (BAR)
- Beef Commission (BEEF)
- Biodiversity Council (BDC)
- Blind, Washington State School for the (WSSB)
- Blueberry Commission (BLUE)
- Building Code Council, State (SBCC)
- Caseload Forecast Council, State of Washington (CFC)
- Center for Childhood Deafness and Hearing Loss, Washington State (WSD)
- Citizens Commission on Salaries for Elected Officials, Washington (SALARIES)
- Civil Legal Aid, Office of (OCLA)
- Code Reviser Statute Law Committee (SLC)
- Columbia River Gorge Commission (CRG)
- Combined Fund Drive (CFD)
- Community & Technical Colleges, State Board for (SBCTC)
- Conservation Commission, State (SCC)
- County Road Administration Board (CRAB)
- Court of Appeals (COA)
- Courts, Administrative Office of the (AOC)
- Criminal Justice Training Commission, Washington State (CJTC)
- Dairy Products Commission (DAIRY)
- Deaf and Hard of Hearing, Office of the (ODHH)
- Developmental Disabilities Council (DDC)
- Disability Issues and Employment, Governor's Committee on (GCDE)
- Early Learning, Department of (DEL)
- Economic and Revenue Forecast Council (ERFC)
- Economic Development Commission (WEDC)
- Economic Development Finance Authority (WEDFA)
- Education Research and Data Center (ERDC)
- Washington State Board of Education (SBE)
- Emergency Management Division (EMD)
- Energy Facility Site Evaluation Council (EFSEC)
- Engineers and Land Surveyors, Board of Registration for (BRELS)
- Environmental Hearings Office (EHO)
- Executive Ethics Board (ETHICS)
- Expenditure Limit Committee (ELC)
- Extension Energy Program (ENERGY)
- Family Policy Council (FPC)
- Financial Management, Office of (OFM)
- Fish and Wildlife, Department of (DFW)
- Forest Practices Appeals Board (FPAB)
- Forest Practices Board (FPB)
- Freight Mobility Strategic Investment Board (FMSIB)
- Fruit Commission (FRUIT)
- Gambling Commission, Washington State (WSGC)
- General Administration, Department of (GA)
- Geographic Information Council, Washington State (WAGIC)
- Geographic Names, Washington State Board on (WBGN)
- Governor, Office of the (GOVERNOR)
- Governor's Office of Indian Affairs (GOIA)
- Grain Commission (WGC)
- Growth Management Hearings Boards (GMBH)
- Hardwoods Commission (WHC)
- Health Care Authority, Washington State (HCA)
- Health Care Facilities Authority (WHCFA)
- Health, Washington State Board of (SBOH)
- Higher Education Coordinating Board (HECB)
- Higher Education Facilities Authority (WHEFA)
- Hispanic Affairs, Washington State Commission on (CHA)
- Historical Society, Eastern Washington State (WSHSEAST)
- History Museum, State (WSHS)
- Home Care Referral Registry (HCRR)
- Horse Racing Commission, Washington State (WHRC)
- House of Representatives, Washington State (HOUSE)
- Housing Finance Commission (WSHFC)
- Human Rights Commission (HRC)
- Hydraulics Appeals Board (HAB)
- Indeterminate Sentence Review Board (SRB)
- Industrial Insurance Appeals, Board of (BIIA)
- Information Services, Department of (DIS)
- Insurance Commissioner, Office of the (OIC)
- Investment Board, Washington State (SIB)
- Jail Industries Board (JIB)
- Joint Transportation Committee (JTC)
- Judicial Conduct, Commission on (CJC)
- K-20 Education Network (K20)
- Labor Relations Office (LABOR)
- Land Commissioner, Office of the (CPL)
- Land Use Study Commission (LANDUSE)
- Landscape Architects, Board of Registration for (BRLA)
- Law Enforcement Officers and Fire Fighters' Plan 2 Retirement Board (LEOFF)
- Law Library, State (SLL)
- Legislative Ethics Board (LEB)
- Legislative Evaluation and Accountability Program Committee (LEAP)
- Legislature Customer Service Center (LEGCS)
- Legislature, State (LEG)
- Library, State (LIB)
- Licensing, Department of (DOL)
- Lieutenant Governor, Office of (LTGOV)
- Liquor and Cannabis Board (LCB)
- Lottery, Washington State (LOTTERY)
- Marine Employees Commission (MAR)
- Medical Commission (WMC)
- Minority and Justice Commission, State (MJC)
- Minority and Women's Business Enterprises, Office of (OMWBE)
- Monitoring Salmon Recovery and Watershed Health, Forum on (MSRWH)
- National and Community Service, Commission for (WCNCS)
- Northwest Cherries (CHERRY)
- Northwest Indian Fisheries Commission (NWIFC)
- Northwest Power and Conservation Council (NPCC)
- Ombudsman, Office of the Education (OEO)
- Ombudsman, Office of the Family and Children's (OFCO)
- Ombudsman, Open Government (OGO)
- Parks and Recreation Commission, State (PARKS)
- Pension Policy, Select Committee on (SCPP)
- Personnel Resources Board (PRB)
- Personnel, Department of (DOP)
- Pesticide Registration, State Commission on (WSCPR)
- Pharmacy, Board of (BOP)
- Pilotage Commissioners, Board of (PILOTAGE)
- Pollution Control Hearings Board (PCHB)
- Pollution Liability Insurance Agency, Washington State (PLIA)
- Potato Commission (POTATO)
- Printing, Department of (PRT)
- Productivity Board (PB)
- Professional Educator Standards Board (PESB)
- Psychology, Board of (PSYCH)
- Public Defense, Office of (OPD)
- Public Deposit Protection Commission (PDPC)
- Public Disclosure Commission (PDC)
- Public Employees Benefits Board Program (PEBB)
- Public Employment Relations Commission (PERC)
- Public Instruction, Office of Superintendent of (OSPI)
- Public Policy, Washington State Institute for (WSIPP)
- Public Works Board (PWB)
- Puget Sound Partnership (PSP)
- Real Estate Appraiser Commission (REAC)
- Real Estate Commission (REC)
- Recreation and Conservation Office (RCO)
- Red Raspberry Commission (RASP)
- Redistricting Committee, State (RDC)
- Regulatory Assistance, Office of (ORA)
- Revenue, Department of (DOR)
- Salaries for Elected Officials, Citizens Commission on (WCCSEO)
- Salmon Recovery Funding Board (SRFB)
- Salmon Recovery Office, Governor's (GSRO)
- School Directors' Association, State (WSSDA)
- Secretary of State, Office of the (SECSTATE)
- Seed Potato Commission (SEED)
- Senate, Washington State (SENATE)
- Sentencing Guidelines Commission (SGC)
- Shorelines Hearings Board (SHB)
- Spokane Intercollegiate Research & Technology Institute (SIRTI)
- State Convention & Trade Center (CTC)
- State Fire Marshal, Office of the (FIRE)
- State Patrol, Washington (WSP)
- Substance Abuse, Governor's Council on (CSA)
- Supreme Court (SC)
- Tax Appeals, Board of (BTA)
- Tax Preferences, Citizen Commission for Performance Measurement of (PMTP)
- Tobacco Settlement Authority (TOB)
- Traffic Records Committee (TRC)
- Traffic Safety Commission (WTSC)
- Transportation Commission, State (STC)
- Transportation Improvement Board (TIB)
- Treasurer, Office of the State (OST)
- Tree Fruit Research Commission (TREE)
- TVW, Public Affairs Network (TVW)
- Utilities and Transportation Commission (UTC)
- Veterans Affairs, Department of (DVA)
- Volunteer Firefighters & Reserve Officers, Board for (BVFF)
- Washington Wellness (WW)
- Wine Commission (WINE)
- Workforce Training and Education Coordinating Board (WFTECB)
