= Government of Washington (state) =

- Seal of the State of Washington
- Polity type: Presidential republic Federated state
- Constitution: Constitution of Washington

Legislative branch
- Name: Legislature
- Type: Bicameral
- Meeting place: Washington State Capitol
- Upper house
- Name: Senate
- Presiding officer: Denny Heck, President
- Lower house
- Name: House of Representatives
- Presiding officer: Laurie Jinkins, Speaker

Executive branch
- Head of state and government
- Title: Governor
- Currently: Bob Ferguson
- Appointer: Election
- Cabinet
- Name: Cabinet
- Leader: Governor
- Deputy leader: Lieutenant Governor
- Headquarters: Washington State Capitol

Judicial branch
- Name: Judiciary of Washington
- Courts: Courts of Washington
- Supreme Court
- Chief judge: Debra L. Stephens
- Seat: Temple of Justice, Olympia

The government of Washington State is the governmental structure of the State of Washington, United States, as established by the Constitution of the State of Washington. The executive is composed of the Governor, several other statewide elected officials and the Governor's cabinet. The Washington State Legislature consists of the House of Representatives and State Senate. The judiciary is composed of the Washington Supreme Court and lower courts. There is also local government, consisting of counties, municipalities and special districts.

== Executive ==
The executive branch of the state's government is organized as a plural executive, in which the heads of the principal departments are filled by individually elected officials. In addition to the Governor of Washington, the state constitutional officers are the Lieutenant Governor, the Attorney General, the Secretary of State, the Treasurer, the Auditor, the Commissioner of Public Lands, and the Superintendent of Public Instruction. Additionally, a number of state departments are governed and managed by independent commissions, including the Department of Fish and Wildlife and the Department of Transportation. Heads of the remaining departments are appointed by the Governor, with the advice and consent of the Washington State Senate. The Governor also enjoys a line item veto, the power to issue pardons and commute death sentences, and they act as commander-in-chief of the state's military forces.

The offices of each of the state constitutional officers are established in the Washington constitution, with the exception of that of the Insurance Commissioner, which was created by statute. They are each elected on a partisan ballot to concurrent four-year terms, except for the Superintendent of Public Instruction who is officially non-partisan.

The current Governor is Bob Ferguson (D), the Lieutenant Governor is Denny Heck (D), the Attorney General is Nick Brown (D), the Secretary of State is Steve Hobbs (D), the Treasurer is Mike Pellicciotti (D), the Auditor is Pat McCarthy (D), the Public Lands Commissioner is Dave Upthegrove (D), and the Insurance Commissioner is Patty Kuderer (D). The Superintendent of Public Instruction is Chris Reykdal.

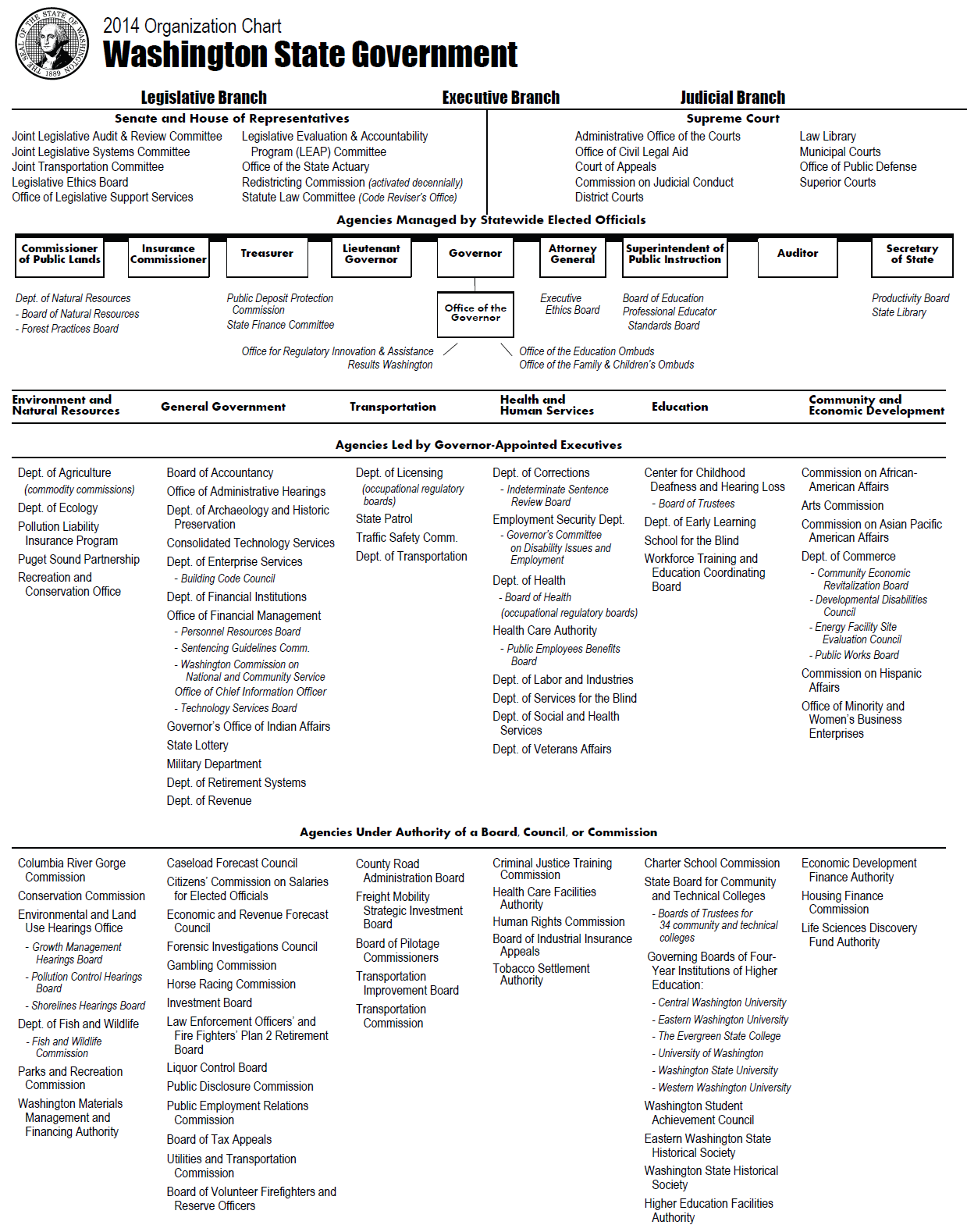
Organization of the executive branch of the government of Washington as of 2014

The current Executive Cabinet that serves under Governor Bob Ferguson (D):

Office and Position	Incumbent
Chief of Staff	Shane Esquibel
Office of Financial Management Director	K.D. Chapman-See
Director of Agriculture	Derek Sandison
Secretary of the Department of Children, Youth, and Families	Tana Senn
Interim Director of the Department of Commerce	Sarah Clifthorne
Director of the Department of Ecology	Casey Sixkiller
Commissioner of the Employment Security Department	Cami Feek
Director of the Department of Enterprise Services	Matt Jones
Director of the Department of Financial Institutions	Charlie Clark
Secretary of the Department of Corrections	Tim Lang
Secretary of the Department of Health	Dennis Worsham
Director of the Health Care Authority	Ryan Moran
Director of the Department of Labor and Industries	Joel Sacks
Director of the Department of Licensing	Marcus Glasper
Acting Director of the Governor's Office of Indian Affairs	Gordon James
Adjutant General of the Military Department	Major General Gent Welsh
Director of the Department of Retirement Systems	Kathryn Leathers
Director of the Department of Revenue	John Ryser
Secretary of the Department of Social and Health Services	Angela Ramirez
Executive Director of the Student Achievement Council	Mike Meotti
Secretary of the Department of Transportation	Julie Meredith
Chair of the Utilities and Transportation Commission	Brian Rybarik
Director of the Department of Veterans Affairs	David Puente Jr.
Chief of the Washington State Patrol	John Batiste
Chief Information Officer	William Kehoe
Director of Your Washington	Jesse Jones

The Executive Leadership Team of the Office of the Governor is composed of members appointed by the Governor whose role is to support the Governor in fulfilling a wide range of duties. The current Executive Leadership Team serves under Governor Bob Ferguson (D):

Office and Position	Incumbent
Chief of Staff	Shane Esquibel
Chief Legal Counsel	Kristin Beneski
Chief Operations Officer	Franklin Plaistowe
Communications Director	Brionna Aho
Office of Financial Management Director	K.D. Chapman-See
Legislative Director	Debbie Driver
Chief Impact Officer	Sahar Fathi
Policy Director	Kenneth Martin

The main administrative departments are:

- Agriculture (WSDA)
- Archaeology and Historic Preservation (DAHP)
- Commerce (COM)
- Corrections (DOC)
- Children, Youth, and Families (DCYF)
- Ecology (ECY)
- Employment Security Department (ESD)
- Washington State Technology Solutions (WaTech)
- Financial Institutions (DFI)
- Fish and Wildlife (WDFW)
- Health (DOH)
- Labor and Industries (L&I)
- Licensing (DOL)
- Washington Military Department (MIL)
- Natural Resources (DNR)
- Puget Sound Partnership
- Retirement Systems (DRS)
- Revenue (DOR)
- Services for the Blind (DSB)
- Social and Health Services (DSHS)
- Transportation (WSDOT)
- Veterans Affairs (DVA)

The Washington State Register (WSR) is a biweekly publication that includes activities of the government. The Washington Administrative Code (WAC) is the codification of regulations arranged by subject and agency.

== Legislature ==
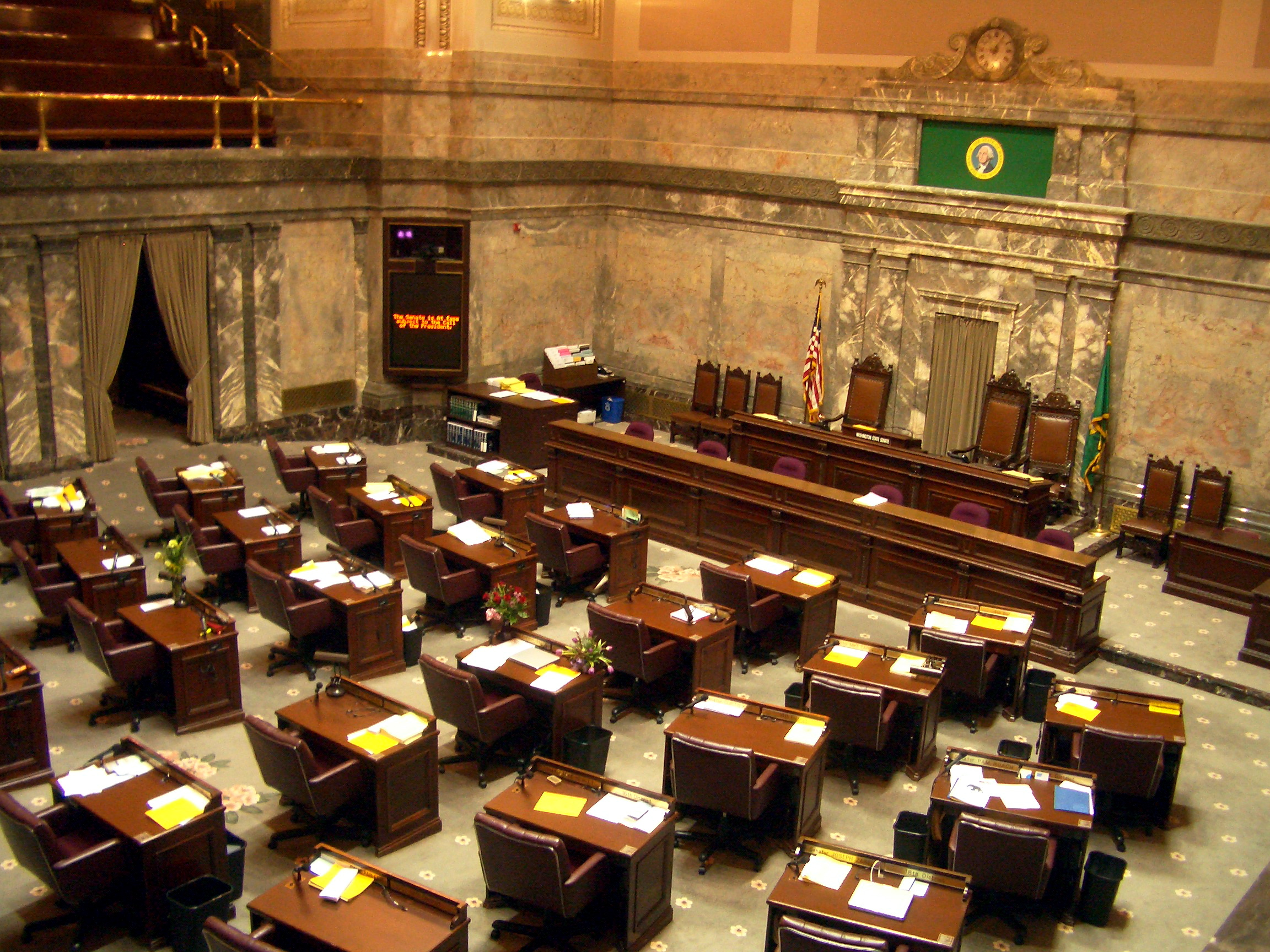
The State Senate Chamber of the Washington State Capitol

The Washington State Legislature is the state's legislative branch. The state legislature is bicameral and is composed of a lower House of Representatives and an upper State Senate. The state is divided into 49 legislative districts of equal population, each of which elects two representatives and one senator. Representatives serve two-year terms, while senators serve for four years. There are no term limits.

The Speaker of the House presides over the House of Representatives. The Speaker and the Speaker Pro Tem are nominated by the majority party caucus followed by a vote of the full House. As well as presiding over the body, the Speaker is also the chief leadership position, and controls the flow of legislation. In the absence of the Speaker the Speaker Pro Tem assumes the role of Speaker. The Lieutenant Governor of Washington serves as the President of the Senate, but only casts a vote if required to break a tie. When the Lieutenant Governor is absent, the President Pro Tempore presides over the Senate. The President Pro Tempore is elected by the majority party caucus followed by confirmation of the entire Senate through a Senate Resolution. The President Pro Tempore is the chief leadership position in the Senate. The other legislative leaders, such as the majority and minority leaders are elected by their respective party caucuses.

Its session laws are published in the Laws of Washington, which in turn have been codified in the Revised Code of Washington (RCW).

== Judiciary ==
The Washington Supreme Court is the highest court in the state. It has original jurisdiction of petitions against state officers, and can review decisions of lower courts if the money or value of property involved exceeds $200. Direct Supreme Court review of a trial court decision is permitted if the action involves a state officer, a trial court has ruled a statute or ordinance unconstitutional, conflicting statutes or rules of law are involved, or the issue is of broad public interest and requires a prompt and ultimate determination. All cases in which the death penalty has been imposed are reviewed directly by the Supreme Court. In all other cases, review of Court of Appeals decisions is left to the discretion of the court. Nine justices serve on the bench and are elected statewide to six-year terms. Motions to be determined by the Court, and petitions for review of Court of Appeals decisions, are heard by five-member departments of the Court, and a less-than-unanimous vote on a petition requires that the entire court consider the matter.

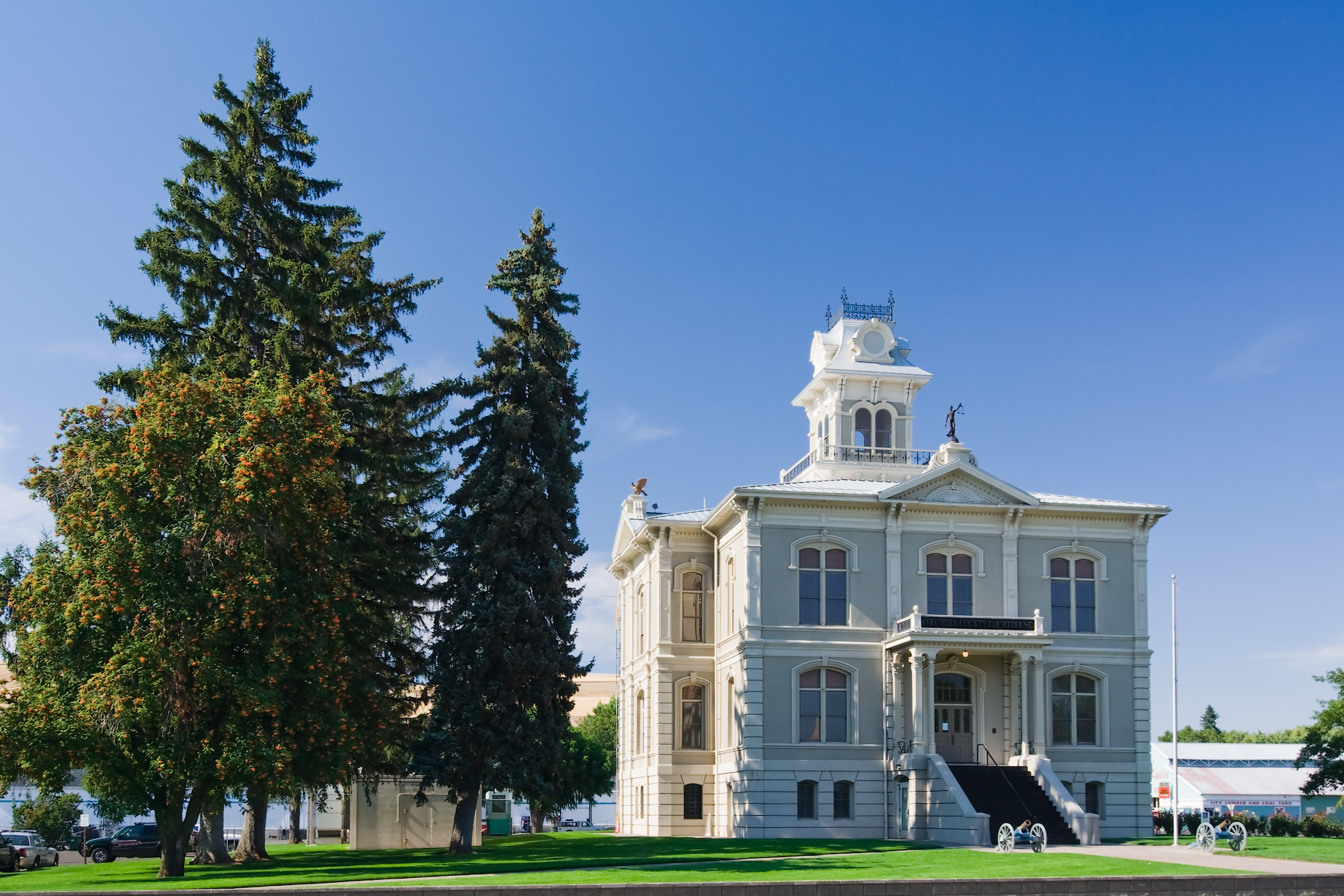
The Columbia County Courthouse in Dayton, home of the Columbia County Superior Court

The Washington Court of Appeals is the intermediate level appellate court empowered to hear appeals from final judgments and orders of superior courts, Personal Restraint Petitions, writs of mandamus and quo warranto, appeals from decisions of administrative agencies, discretionary review of a superior court's decision in an appeal from a court of limited jurisdiction, and discretionary review of interlocutory appeals from rulings of superior court for which there is no other effective remedy. Judges are elected for six-year terms. The court is divided into three divisions. Cases are heard by panels of three judges. There is no en banc procedure.

The Washington superior courts are courts of general jurisdiction, grouped into thirty single or multi-county districts. The Washington district courts (of counties) and Washington municipal courts (of cities and towns) are courts of limited jurisdiction which hear cases involving misdemeanor crimes, traffic, non-traffic, and parking infractions, domestic violence protection orders, civil actions of $75,000 or less, and small claims of up to $5,000. Superior court and district court judges are elected to four-year terms, and municipal court judges may be elected or appointed to four-year terms depending on state law. In addition to municipal courts, cities can establish traffic violation bureaus (TVBs) that handle traffic violations of municipal ordinances.

The Washington State Bar Association (WSBA) licenses and regulates attorneys, and serves its members as a professional association. The Commission on Judicial Conduct consists of 11 members (two attorneys selected by the WSBA, three judges selected by the sitting judges of the state, and six non-attorneys appointed by the Governor), which is authorized to investigate complaints against sitting judges and recommend the removal of judges, which can be effected by a majority vote of the Supreme Court.

== Local government ==
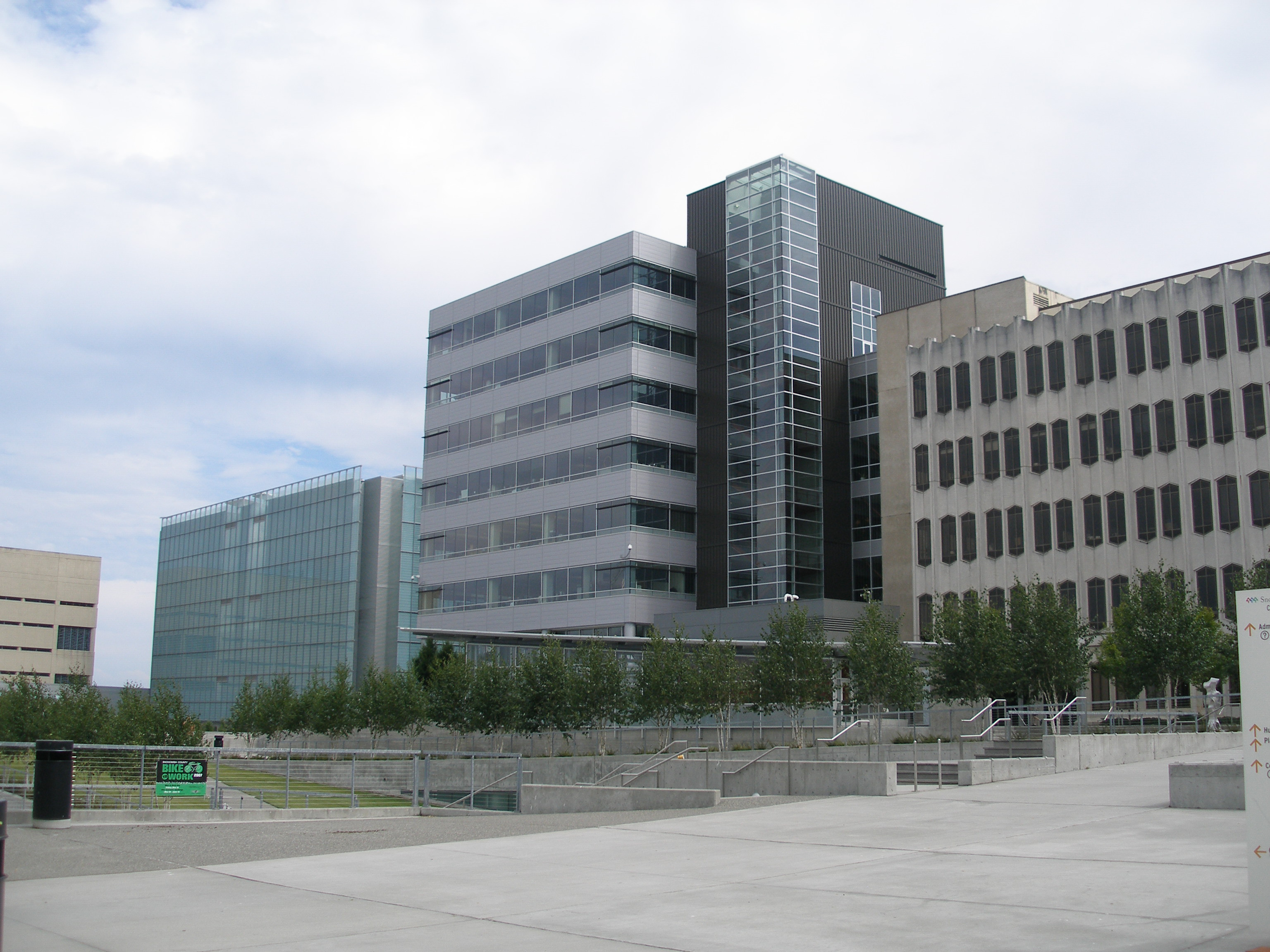
The Snohomish County Government Campus in Everett

The powers of the counties of Washington are exercised by three to five county commissioners, or by a different form of government provided by "home rule" charters, such as a council-elected executive, council-appointed administrator, or commission-appointed administrator form. The cities and towns of Washington can be organized under mayor-council, council-manager, and commission forms of government. The power of the public to initiate ordinances by petition and to have enacted ordinances referred to the voters are only available in first class cities, code cities, cities or towns organized under the commission plan of government, and home rule counties. Special purpose districts are governments that provide an array of services and facilities including electricity, fire protection, flood control, health districts and hospital districts, housing, irrigation, parks and recreation, library, water-sewer service and more recently stadiums, convention centers, and entertainment facilities that are not otherwise available from city or county governments.

== See also ==
- Elections in Washington (state)
- Political party strength in Washington (state)
- Law of Washington (state)
