= Conscience clause in medicine in the United States =

Conscience clauses are legal clauses attached to laws in some parts of the United States and other countries which permit pharmacists, physicians, and/or other providers of health care not to provide certain medical services for reasons of religion or conscience. It can also involve parents withholding consenting for particular treatments for their children.

In many cases, the clauses also permit health care providers to refuse to refer patients to unopposed providers. Those who choose not to refer or provide services may not be disciplined or discriminated against. The provision is most frequently enacted in connection with issues relating to reproduction, such as abortion (see conscientious objection to abortion), sterilization, contraception, and stem cell based treatments, but may include any phase of patient care.

== History ==
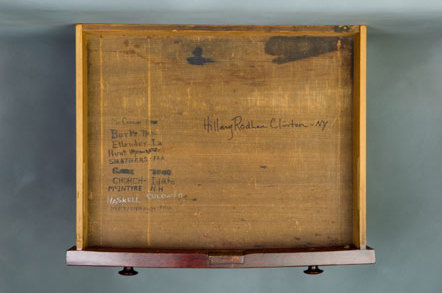
Inside drawer to Senator Frank Church's (D-ID) senate desk

The earliest national conscience clause law in the United States, which was enacted immediately following the Supreme Court's decision in Roe v. Wade, applied only to abortion and sterilization. It was sponsored by Senator Frank Church of Idaho. The Church Amendment of 1973, passed by the Senate on a vote of 92–1, exempted private hospitals receiving federal funds under the Hill-Burton Act, Medicare and Medicaid from any requirement to provide abortions or sterilizations when they objected on “the basis of religious beliefs or moral convictions.” Nearly every state enacted similar legislation by the end of the decade—often with the support of legislators who otherwise supported abortion rights. Supreme Court Justice Harry Blackmun, the author of the Roe v. Wade majority opinion, endorsed such clauses “appropriate protection” for individual physicians and denominational hospitals.

According to Nancy Berlinger, of the bioethics research institute The Hastings Center, "...Conscientious objection in health care always has a social dimension and ...Laws and professional guidelines on conscientious objection in health care must balance the respect for an individual’s beliefs against the well-being of the general public."

Conscience clauses have been adopted by a number of U.S. states. including Arkansas, Illinois, Indiana, Iowa, Kansas, Kentucky, Louisiana, Maine, Maryland, Massachusetts, Michigan, Mississippi, Pennsylvania, and South Dakota. There are some recent comprehensive reviews of federal and state conscience clause laws across the United States and in select other countries.

Some clauses address local concerns: Oregon, recognizes a physician's right to refuse to participate in physician-assisted suicide, although it is legal in that state.

=== Informed consent ===
An informed consent clause, although allowing medical professionals not to perform procedures against their conscience, does not allow professionals to give fraudulent information to deter a patient from obtaining such a procedure (such as lying about the risks involved in an abortion to deter one from obtaining one) in order to impose one's belief using deception. These principles were reaffirmed in the Utah Supreme Court's decision in Wood v. University of Utah Medical Center (2002). Commenting on the case, bioethicist Jacob Appel of New York University wrote that "if only a small number of physicians intentionally or negligently withhold information from their patients significant damage is done to the medical profession as a whole" because "pregnant women will no longer know whether to trust their doctors."

=== Right of Conscience Rule ===
The Right of Conscience Rule was a set of protections for healthcare workers enacted by President George W. Bush on December 18, 2008, allowing healthcare workers to refuse care based on their personal beliefs. Specifically, the rule denied federal funding to institutions that did not allow workers to refuse care that went against their beliefs. In February 2011, President Barack Obama rescinded the Right of Conscience Rule.

=== Pharmacists ===
States have historically provided a conscience clause right allowing pharmacists to refrain from participating in abortions. In April 2005, Governor Rod Blagojevich by emergency executive order required all pharmacists to provide Plan B levonorgestrel. In September 2012, the Illinois Appellate Court found the Governor's order violated Illinois law.

In June 2006, the Pharmacy Board of the Washington State Department of Health rejected a draft rule proposed by Governor Christine Gregoire to require all pharmacies to begin carrying Plan B. Governor Gregoire responded by releasing a public statement warning the board members to reconsider or they could be removed. In July 2006, the Washington State Human Rights Commission warned the board members that they would be personally liable for illegally discriminating against women if they did not pass the Governor's Plan B rule. In April 2007, the Board approved a final rule prohibiting pharmacies from not stocking Plan B for religious reasons but allowing exemptions for “good faith” business reasons.

When Ralph's Thriftway, a grocery store in Olympia, Washington, refused for religious reasons to carry Plan B, it was widely boycotted, leading Gregoire to cancel the grocer's longstanding account with the Washington Governor's Mansion. The only complaints for violating the Plan B rule were filed against the grocer. Half of Washington's hospitals are Catholic. The grocer sued but, instead of alleging violations of the broader Constitution of Washington, its attorneys at the Alliance Defending Freedom and the Becket Fund for Religious Liberty only filed under the Free Exercise Clause of the United States Constitution. The case is known as Stormans, Inc. v. Wiesman.

On November 8, 2007, U.S. District Judge Ronald B. Leighton granted the grocer a preliminary injunction blocking the rule. On May 1, 2008, United States Court of Appeals for the Ninth Circuit Judges Thomas G. Nelson and Jay Bybee denied the state a stay of the injunction pending appeal, over a dissent by Judge A. Wallace Tashima. However, on July 8, 2009, Circuit Judge Kim McLane Wardlaw, joined by Richard Clifton and N. Randy Smith reversed the preliminary injunction.

On February 22, 2012, after four years of discovery and a twelve-day bench trial, Judge Leighton issued a permanent injunction blocking the Plan B rule as unconstitutional. On July 23, 2015, Circuit Judge Susan P. Graber, joined by Judges Mary H. Murguia and Richard Clifton reversed. The grocer's petition for certiorari from the Supreme Court of the United States was denied on June 28, 2016. Justice Samuel Alito, joined by Chief Justice John Roberts and Justice Clarence Thomas, dissented, writing that “the rules challenged here reflect antipathy towards religious beliefs that do not accord with the views of those holding the levers of government power.”

In 2014 and 2016, Senator Cory Booker introduced the “Access to Birth Control Act” bill, which would require all pharmacists in the United States to provide emergency contraception.

== Responses ==
Health care providers opposed to abortion or contraception support the clauses because they believe that disciplinary or legal action for refusing to perform services obliges providers to supply services which their moral or religious principles forbid.

Reproductive rights organizations, such as Planned Parenthood and NARAL Pro-Choice America, oppose the provision because they maintain that pharmacists, doctors, and hospitals have a professional duty to fulfill patients' legal medical needs, regardless of their own ethical stances. Opponents see conscience clauses as an attempt to limit reproductive rights in lieu of bans struck down by Supreme Court rulings such as Roe v. Wade. Though the case has been overturned by Dobbs v. Jackson Women's Health Organization.

As a result, the term "conscience clause" is controversial and primarily used by those who support these provisions. Those who oppose them often prefer to use the term "refusal clause," implying that those who exercise the clauses are refusing to treat a patient.

In 2018, Roger Severino, the then-Director of the Office for Civil Rights at the United States Department of Health and Human Services, criticized those who oppose conscience clauses, saying “[t]here’s a movement that tries to squelch dissent on the question of abortion so that those that stand up for life are being systematically driven out of the medical profession.” He also stated that “[n]obody should be fired from their position as a medical professional because they refuse to participate in the taking of a human life in abortion. It’s illegal, if you receive federal funds. You may expect an enforcement action from the HHS Office for Civil Rights, if you do such a thing.”

== Catholic doctrine ==
The conscience clause is widely invoked in Catholic universities, hospitals, and agencies because the Catholic Church opposes abortion, contraceptives, sterilization, and embryonic stem cell treatments. Opponents of related FOCA legislation have interpreted the possible end of the conscience clause as a demand to either "do abortions or close." Timothy Dolan has said, "“In effect, the president is saying we have a year to figure out how to violate our consciences." However, conscience clauses are sometimes interpreted differently and their use will often depend on the given context.

Three members of the Department of Obstetrics, Gynecology and Reproductive Sciences and the Bixby Center for Global Reproductive Health at UCSF have questioned whether "conscience clauses" are ethical, writing in a journal article that "in some Catholic-owned hospitals, the private patient–physician relationship, patient safety, and patient comfort are compromised by religious mandates that require physicians to act contrary to the current standard of care in miscarriage management."

== See also ==
- Religious views on birth control
