= Vehicle registration plates of Washington =

Vehicle registration plates of Washington may refer to:

- Vehicle registration plates of Washington (state)
- Vehicle registration plates of Washington, D.C.
