= Government of Washington =

Government of Washington may refer to:

- Government of Washington (state)
- Government of Washington, D.C.
- Federal government of the United States in Washington, D.C.
- Presidency of George Washington, 1789–1797
