= Vehicle registration plates of the United States for 1925 =

1925 license plates in the United States

Vehicle registration plates of the United States by year
| Vehicle registration plates of the United States for 1924 | Events of 1925 | Vehicle registration plates of the United States for 1926 |

Each of the 48 states of the United States of America plus several of its territories and the District of Columbia issued individual passenger license plates for 1925.

== Passenger baseplates ==
Passenger Car Plates
| Image | Region | Design | Slogan | Serial format | Serials issued | Notes |
|---|---|---|---|---|---|---|
| | Alabama | | | | | |
| | Alaska | | | | | |
| | American Samoa | | | | | |
| | Arizona | | | | | |
| | Arkansas | | | | | |
| | California | | | | | |
| | Canal Zone | | | | | |
| | Colorado | | | | | |
| | Connecticut | | | | | |
| | Delaware | | | | | |
| | District of Columbia | | | | | |
| | Florida | | | | | |
| | Georgia | | | | | |
| | Guam | | | | | |
| | Hawai'i | | | | | |
| | Idaho | | | | | |
| | Illinois | | | | | |
| | Indiana | | | | | |
| | Iowa | | | | | |
| | Kansas | | | | | |
| | Kentucky | | | | | |
| | Louisiana | | | | | |
| | Maine | | | | | |
| | Maryland | | | | | |
| | Massachusetts | | | | | |
| | Michigan | | | | | |
| | Minnesota | | | | | |
| | Mississippi | | | | | |
| | Missouri | | | | | |
| | Montana | | | | | |
| | Nebraska | | | | | |
| | Nevada | | | | | |
| | New Hampshire | | | | | |
| | New Jersey | | | | | |
| | New Mexico | | | | | |
| | New York | | | | | |
| | North Carolina | Embossed white serial on dark blue plate with border line; "NC" monogram and "6-30 25" at left | none | 123.456 | 1 to approximately 320.000 | |
| | North Dakota | | | | | |
| | Northern Mariana; Islands | | | | | |
| | Ohio | | | | | |
| | Oklahoma | | | | | |
| | Oregon | | | | | |
| | Pennsylvania | | | | | |
| | Puerto Rico | | | | | |
| | Rhode Island | | | | | |
| | South Carolina | | | | | |
| | South Dakota | | | | | |
| | Tennessee | | | | | |
| | Texas | | | | | |
| | Utah | | | | | |
| | Vermont | | | | | |
| | Virginia | | | | | |
| | Washington | | | | | |
| | West Virginia | | | | | |
| | Wisconsin | Embossed deep yellow serial on dark blue plate; vertical "WIS" at left, weight class over "25" at right | none | 123-456A | Coded by weight class | Weight classes are A, B, C, D, and E |
| | Wyoming | | | | | |

== Non-passenger plates ==
Non-passenger Plates
| Image (standard) | Region | Type | Design & Slogan | Serial format | Serials issued | Notes |
|---|---|---|---|---|---|---|
| | Wisconsin | Dealer | Embossed deep yellow serial on dark blue plate; vertical "WIS" over "25" at right; embossed solid star at left | 1234A | Dealer number and plate number | The number is the dealer number, the letter is the plate number for that dealer. |
| | Wisconsin | Motorcycle | Embossed deep yellow serial on dark blue plate; "W" over "25" at right | A1234 | A 1 to approximately A1800 | Used on regular motorcycles |
| | Wisconsin | Motorcycle | Embossed deep yellow serial on dark blue plate; "W" over "25" at right | B1234 | B 1 to approximately B1200 | Used on motorcycles with sidecars |
| | Wisconsin | Municipal | Embossed white serial on brown plate; vertical "WIS" at right | 1234 | 1 to approximately 3100 | Undated issue from 1924-1929; motorcycle version also available |
| | Wisconsin | Truck | Embossed deep yellow serial on dark blue plate; vertical "WIS" over "25" at left; vertical "TRUCK" in between "WIS" and serial; weight class over "25" at right | 12-345A | Coded by weight class | Weight classes are A, B, C, D, E, and F |

== See also ==
- Antique vehicle registration
- Electronic license plate
- Motor vehicle registration
- Vehicle license
