= Washington State University Extension Energy Program =

Academic unit in Olympia, Washington, US

Washington State University Energy Program
- Established: July 1997
- Director: Georgine Yorgey
- Location: Olympia, Washington
- Website: www.energy.wsu.edu

The Washington State University (WSU) Energy Program is a self-supported department within the university. Program staff include engineers, energy specialists, technical experts, and software developers. The program office is located in Olympia, Washington.

Project funding typically comes from federal government and energy-marketing agencies, and other sources. Operating much like a consulting firm, the program's customers include large and small businesses, industrial plants, utilities, government agencies, Tribes, institutions, and schools.

== History ==
The 1970s energy crisis was the impetus for formation of the interim Washington State Energy Office, a precursor to the WSU Energy Program. Then Gov. Daniel J. Evans established the WSEO by executive order in 1975.

The state established the new agency to coordinate energy-related policies and programs, gather energy supply data, and forecast energy use. The WSEO was also tasked with coordinating with federal energy agencies, helping to establish a citizen-based advisory committee on state energy policy, and developing contingency plans for dealing with energy shortages. The executive order transferred to the new office energy-related functions of the state departments of Emergency Services and General Administration.

The following year, the WSEO was codified and its duties expanded to include "energy education, applied research, technology transfer, and energy efficiency in public buildings."

In 1981, the state legislature broadened and clarified the agency's scope again to include the Energy Policy Group, and established a six-year sunset clause. Over the next few years, the legislature would add to the WSEO's responsibilities staff support for the Energy Facility Site Evaluation Council, the Washington Energy Strategy project, the Energy Partnerships program, and the Commuter Trip Reduction program.

At its peak in 1993, 179 full-time employees worked for the WSEO. Most of the Energy Office's funding came from sources other than the state's General Fund, including the Bonneville Power Administration and the U.S. Department of Energy. For the fiscal year beginning July 1, 1995, state funds accounted for just three percent of the WSEO's $17 million budget.

In 1995, faced with a recession, instability in federal funding, and a state budget nearly two billion dollars in the red, then Gov. Mike Lowry cut two-thirds of the WSEO's jobs. The following year, the state legislature passed a bill that redistributed WSEO functions to other state agencies. In June 1996, the office closed.

WSEO officials claimed credit for accomplishments in three primary areas:

- Encouraging the substitution of energy-efficient products for those that consumed more energy,
- Helping individuals and organizations change the way they used energy, and
- Coordinating energy interests in Washington State government.

WSEO programs related to renewable energy, software, industrial efficiency, education, the EnergyIdeas clearinghouse, and telecommunications were assigned to the Washington State University Extension. Other WSEO programs were transferred to the state departments of General Administration, Transportation, and what was then Community Trade and Economic Development (now Commerce).

The Energy Program was significantly reduced in size and scope due to diminished federal and regional funding in 2013/14.

== Projects ==
=== Energy call centers ===
One of the WSU Energy Program's major projects was managing and operating several call centers – the largest on behalf of the U.S. Department of Energy's Office of Energy Efficiency and Renewable Energy. There are no current call centers operating.

=== Building efficiency ===
The WSU Energy Program is responsible for supporting the residential sections of the Washington State Energy Code. In addition, the program's building science team works with the construction industry, code officials, facility managers, and homeowners to improve building efficiency.

=== Industrial efficiency ===
WSU Energy Program engineers conduct plant assessments and trainings aimed at improving the efficiency of motors, steam, and compressed-air systems and other industrial processes at Northwest manufacturing plants.

The program also develops software for analyzing industrial energy projects, and produces case studies and other publications aimed at improving industrial efficiency.

=== Agricultural efficiency ===
Working with state and federal agencies and trade associations, the WSU Energy Program implements the Washington Farm Energy Program to help reduce agricultural energy use.

As part of that effort, engineers and software developers have developed tools to analyze farm energy use and the financial viability of energy projects.

=== Renewable energy ===
Working with other organizations and agencies, the WSU Energy Program is involved in efforts to develop and promote alternative transportation fuels and other energy sources, including bioenergy, geothermal, hydrogen, and fuel cells. The program also certifies solar photovoltaic energy systems that qualify for state incentives through the Washington State Department of Revenue.

=== Green Transportation Program ===
Working as a program under the Energy Program, the Washington State University Green Transport Program assists State, Tribal, Federal, and private NGOs in the Northwest Region (Washington State, Wyoming, Oregon, Alaska, Idaho, Montana, British Columbia, Alberta) switching to renewable fuels. This aid includes technical assistance, research and development of renewable resources, infrastructure assessment, and data analytics.

=== Public facilities support ===
The WSU Energy Program provides services related to operations and maintenance of facilities such as schools and government agencies, recommends practices to improve indoor air quality, and supports resource conservation managers hired by government agencies and schools to reduce fuel and utility expenditures.

The WSU Energy Program also housed the Plant Operations Support Consortium, which previously assisted facilities managers in the Pacific Northwest.

=== Research and evaluation ===
The WSU Energy Program evaluates energy efficiency technologies and initiatives, and provides funders with performance data. The program also supports development of the energy workforce through labor market and education research, technical assistance, and the evaluation of programs and policies.

=== Computer services ===
WSU Energy Program engineers and programmers develop software for analyzing energy projects, and design and manage energy-related websites for a variety of clients. The program's information technology staff also works on contract to provide support to other local and regional offices.
