= Vehicle registration plates of the United States for 1927 =

1927 license plates in the United States

Vehicle registration plates of the United States by year
Vehicle registration plates of the United States for 1926	Events of 1927	Vehicle registration plates of the United States for 1928

Each of the 48 states of the United States of America plus several of its territories and the District of Columbia issued individual passenger license plates for 1927.

== Passenger baseplates ==
Passenger Car Plates
Image	Region	Design	Slogan	Serial format	Serials issued	Notes
	Alabama	Embossed white numbers and border line on black plate; "ALABAMA 1927" at bottom	None	A-123-456	Coded by horsepower class (A)	*First use of the full state name. *Issued for 10/1/1926 - 9/30/1927
	Alaska	Embossed white numbers and border on dark blue plate; "ALASKA" across top;1927 with two lines above and below year at right	None	1234	Unknown	
	American Samoa	Embossed black numbers on white plate;"A.S." embossed left; 1927 vertical at right	None		? to ?	
	Arizona	Embossed black numbers and border line on copper plate; "ARIZONA" at bottom, offset to left; vertical "1927" at right	None	1-12345 to 10-1234	Coded by county of issuance (1 or 10)	
	Arkansas	Embossed yellow numbers and border line on green plate; "ARK 27" at right	None	123-456	? to ?	
	California	Embossed white numbers and border line on maroon plate;"CALIFORNIA" centered at bottom with "19 at left and "27" at right	None	1-234-567	? to ?	Validated for single year.
	Canal Zone	Embossed red numbers on white plate; "CANAL ZONE" bottom; "1927" vertical left	None	1234	1 to ?	
	Colorado	Embossed white numbers and border line on black plate; "COLO. 1927" centered at bottom	None	123-456	1 to about 308-000	
	Connecticut	Embossed white numbers on maroon plate; "CONN. 1927" embossed in white centered at bottom	None	123-456; A-12-345	? to ?	Serials issued in blocks to branch offices.
	Delaware	Embossed red numbers and border line on gray plate; "DEL 27" at right	None	12-345	1 to about 40-000	
	District of Columbia	Embossed golden yellow numbers and border line on black plate; "DIST. COL. 1927" centered at top	None	A-1234	E-1 to about V-1000	Letters E, F, G, J, K, M, P, Q, S, U, V were used for passenger vehicles.
	Florida	Embossed white numbers and border line on black plate; "FLORIDA-27" centered at bottom	None	123-456-C	1-C to about 409-000-C	First use of the full state name.
	Georgia	Embossed black numbers and border line on yellow plate; vertical "GA-27" as separator	None	123-456	1 to about 265-000	On three digit plates "GA-27" appears at left.
	Guam	Flat black numbers on white plate; "Guam" and 1927	None	123	? to ?	
	Hawai'i	Embossed black numbers and border line on silver plate; "HAWAII 1927" centered at bottom	None	12-345	? to ?	Serial were issued in blocks to each county.
	Idaho	Embossed orange numbers on dark blue plate, "IDAHO–27" at bottom	None	12-345	1 to about 95-000	
	Illinois	Embossed black numbers and border line on orange plate; "ILL 27" debossed in orange within embossed state silhouette at right	None	1-234-567	1 to about 1-249-000	Only year for the embossed state silhouette.
	Indiana	Emobssed white lettering and border line on black plate;"IND" over "27" at right	None	123-456	1 to about 707-000	
	Iowa	Embossed orange numbers and border line on dark blue plate; "IA 27" at right	None	1-12345; 10-1234; A-12345	1-1 to 88–9999; A-1 to N-99999	First characters are the county code with numbers 1 to 88, 00 and letters A, B, C, E, F, H, J, K, L, M, N used.
	Kansas	Embossed black numbers and border line on gray plate; Vertical "1927" and "KAN" at left and right respectively	None	123-456	1 to about 459-000	
	Kentucky	Embossed white numbers on blue plate. Plate divided into four bordered sections; "KY", county name and "27" at top; Serial numbers in bottom left and bottom right sections	None	1234; 12 345	Numbers begin at 1 in each county.	First U.S. passenger plate to show the name of the county of issuance.
	Louisiana	Embossed white numbers and border line on green plate; "LA-1927" centered at bottom	None	123-456	1 to 50000	Only for vehicles with 23 horsepower or more.
	Louisiana	Embossed black numbers and border line on cream plate; "LA-1927" centered at bottom	None	123-456	50000 to about 224000	Only for vehicles with 22 horsepower or less.
	Maine	Embossed dark blue numbers and border line on golden yellow plate; "MAINE 1927" centered at bottom	None	123-456	1 to about 130-000	
	Maryland	Embossed black numbers and border line on white plate; "MARYLAND 1927" centered at bottom	None	123-456	30-000 to about 288-000	
	Massachusetts	Embossed white numbers on maroon plate; "MASS — 1927" at bottom	None	123,456	1 to about 624,000	
	Michigan	Embossed black numbers on yellow plate; "MICHIGAN" at bottom left; 1927" at bottom right	None	123-456; M123-456	1 to 999999; M1 to about M133-000	The plates beginning with an "M" have a diamond shape around the "M" with a small bar inside
	Minnesota	Embossed light green numbers and border line on dark green plate; Vertical "MINN" at right; "27" in bottom left corner with weight class above	None	A123-456; B123-456	A1 to about A258-000; B1 to about B294-000	"A" weight class is below 2000 pounds, and "B" is above this.
	Mississippi	Embossed yellow numbers and border line on navy blue plate; "MISS. 1927" centered at bottom	None	123-456	1 to about 235-000	
	Missouri	Embossed white numbers and border line on dark blue plate; "MO. 1927" centered at bottom	None	123-456	1 to about 606-000	
	Montana	Embossed black numbers and border line on green plate; "MONT –27" at left	None	12-345	1 to about 95-000	
	Nebraska	Embossed white numbers on maroon plate; "NEB" lower right with "1927" above	None	1-12345; 10-1234	1-1 to 93-9999	First characters are the county code with numbers 1 to 93.
	Nevada	Debossed yellow numbers and border line on green plate; "NEVADA 1927" at bottom	None	12-345	00-001 to about 21-000	Plates with only three digits had "00" in front of the dash.
	New Hampshire	Embossed dark green numbers and border line on white plate; "N H" and "1927" centered at top and bottom respectively	none	12-345	100 to about 91-000	Serials below 3-000 have the year 1927 overstamping 1925.
	New Jersey	Embossed white lettering embossed on green base;"N.J. -- 27." at top	none	A12345; 1 E1234; ON1234	A1000 to Z99999; E1000 to E5100; ON1000 to ON4000	County letter code at left to include "1E" and "ON".
	New Mexico	Embossed black numbers and border line on yellow plate; "27" within embossed Zia sun symbol at left; "NEW MEXICO" centered at bottom	none	12-345	1 to approximately 55-000	Full state name and Zia symbol first used.
	New York	Embossed black numbers and border lin on golden yellow plate; "N Y 2 7" centered at top	none	1A-1; 1A-12; 1A-1-23; 1A-12-34; A-1; A-12; A-1-23; A-12-34	1A-1 to 9Z-99-99; X-1 to Z-99-99	The letter "Y" was not used.
	North Carolina	Embossed white numbers and border line on black plate; "NC" monogram and horsepower class at right; "6 30 27" at left	None	123-456	1 to about 465-000	Valid from 7-1-1926 to 6-30-1927.
	North Carolina	Embossed red numbers and border line on white plate; vertical "NC" at left; horsepower class and "27" at right	None	123-456	1 to about 465-000	Valid from 7-1-1927 to 12-31-1927.
	North Dakota	Embossed black numbers and border line on orange plate; vertical "ND" at left and "1927" at right	None	123-456	1 to about 140-000	
	Northern Mariana; Islands					Did not issue license plates until 1944.
	Ohio	Embossed black embossed lettering on gray base and border	none	123-456 ★12-345; A1-234	1 to 999999; ★1 to ★99999; A 1 to E9-999	
	Oklahoma	Embossed yellow numbers and border line on black plate; "OKLA 1927" at bottom	None	123-456; 123F456	? to ?	The "F" denotes plates for Ford Model T cars to ensure these cheaper plates were not used on vehicles with more horsepower.
	Oregon	Embossed white numbers on black plate; "OREGON-1927" at bottom	None	123-456	1 thru 60-000 and 80–000 to about 262-000	First use of the full state name.
	Pennsylvania	Emobssed yellow numbers and border line on black plate; "1927 PENNA" top center with keystone symbols at top left and right	None	123-456; A12-345	1 to 999-999; A 1 to about D63-000	
	Puerto Rico	Embossed white numbers and border line on red plate; "PR" at right; "1926-1927" at bottom	None	1234	? to ?	
	Puerto Rico	Embossed purple numbers and border line on gray plate; "PR" at right; "1927-1928 at bottom	None	1234	? to ?	
	Rhode Island	Embossed black numbers and border line on white plate; "27 R.I." centered at top	None	12-345	1 to about 97-000	
	South Carolina	Embossed green numbers and border line on white plate; "SC" and tree embossed at right, with debossed white "27" in tree	None	A123-456	A 1 to F 1-500	Letter corresponds to weight class. This is the last appearance of the Palmetto Tree until 1976 on the SC license plates.
	South Dakota	Embossed black numbers and border line on mint green plate;"SD" at right; "27" at left	None	1-1234; 10-1234; A 1-1234	1-1 to 64–9999; A 1–1 to A 1-3200	County code before dash.
	Tennessee	Embossed white numbers within state outline on lavender plate; "TENN" in top right corner and "27" in bottom right corner; vertical "FRONT" or "REAR" used as separator in numbers in middle;	None	123-456	51-000 to approximately 326-000	
	Texas	Embossed white numbers and border line on green plate; "TEXAS" vertical right; "1927" vertical left	None	123-456; A12-345	1 to 999-999; A00-000 to about A69-000	
	Utah	Embossed white numbers and border line on dark blue plate; "UTAH" over "27" at left	None	12-345	1-500 to about 82-000	
	Vermont	Embossed yellow numbers and border line on green plate; "VERMONT 1927" at bottom	None	12-345	1 to about 75-000	
	Virgin Islands	Flat white numbers on blue plate	None		? to ?	Major islands have their own letter prefix.
	Virginia	Embossed red numbers and border line on bright green plate; "VIRGINIA - 27" at bottom	None	123-456	1 to about 293-000	
	Washington	Embossed green numbers on white plate and border; "WASHINGTON" at bottom; vertical "X27" at left	None	123-456	1 to ?	
	West Virginia	Embossed black numbers on gray plate with raised border; "WEST VIRGINIA 1927" at top	None	123-456	1 to ?	
	Wisconsin	Embossed white numbers on black plate and border; vertical "WIS" at left and "27" at bottom right; weight class above year	None	123-456A	Coded by weight class	Weight classes were A, B, C, D, and E
	Wyoming	Embossed black numbers on yellow plate and embossed borders at top and bottom; "1927 WYO" at left	None	12345	1 to about 47000	

== Non-passenger plates ==
Non-passenger Plates
Image (standard)	Region	Type	Design & Slogan	Serial format	Serials issued	Notes
	Wisconsin	City bus	Embossed white serial on black plate; unknown format		Coded by weight class	
	Wisconsin	Dealer	Embossed white serial on black plate; vertical "WIS" over "27" at right; embossed solid star at left	1234A	Dealer number and plate number	The number is the dealer number, the letter is the plate number for that dealer
	Wisconsin	Duplicate	Embossed white serial on black plate; vertical "WIS" at left, weight class over "27" at right; "DUPLICATE" under serial	123 A	Coded by weight class	
	Wisconsin	Duplicate truck	Embossed white serial on black plate; vertical "WIS" at left, weight class over "27" at right; "DUPLICATE" under serial, vertical "TRUCK" in between serial and "WIS"	123 A	Coded by weight class	
	Wisconsin	Interurban bus	Embossed white serial on black plate; unknown format		Coded by weight class	
	Wisconsin	Motorcycle	Embossed white serial on black plate; "W" over "27" at right	1234A	1 A to approximately 1700A	Used on regular motorcycles
	Wisconsin	Motorcycle	Embossed white serial on black plate; "W" over "27" at right	123B	1 B to approximately 700B	Used on motorcycles with sidecars
	Wisconsin	Municipal	Embossed white serial on brown plate; vertical "WIS" at right	1234	1 to approximately 3100	Undated issue from 1924 to 1929; motorcycle version also available
	Wisconsin	Truck	Embossed white serial on black plate; vertical "WIS" at left, weight class over "27" at right; vertical "TRUCK" between serial and "WIS"	12-345A	Coded by weight class	Weight classes were A, B, C, D, E, and F

== See also ==
- Antique vehicle registration
- Electronic license plate
- Motor vehicle registration
- Vehicle license
