= Seattle Metropolitan Chamber of Commerce =

- Founded: 1882
- Purpose: Business federation
- Location: Seattle, Washington
- Region served: Seattle Area
- Key people: Joe Nguyen, President & CEO
- Website: seattlechamber.com

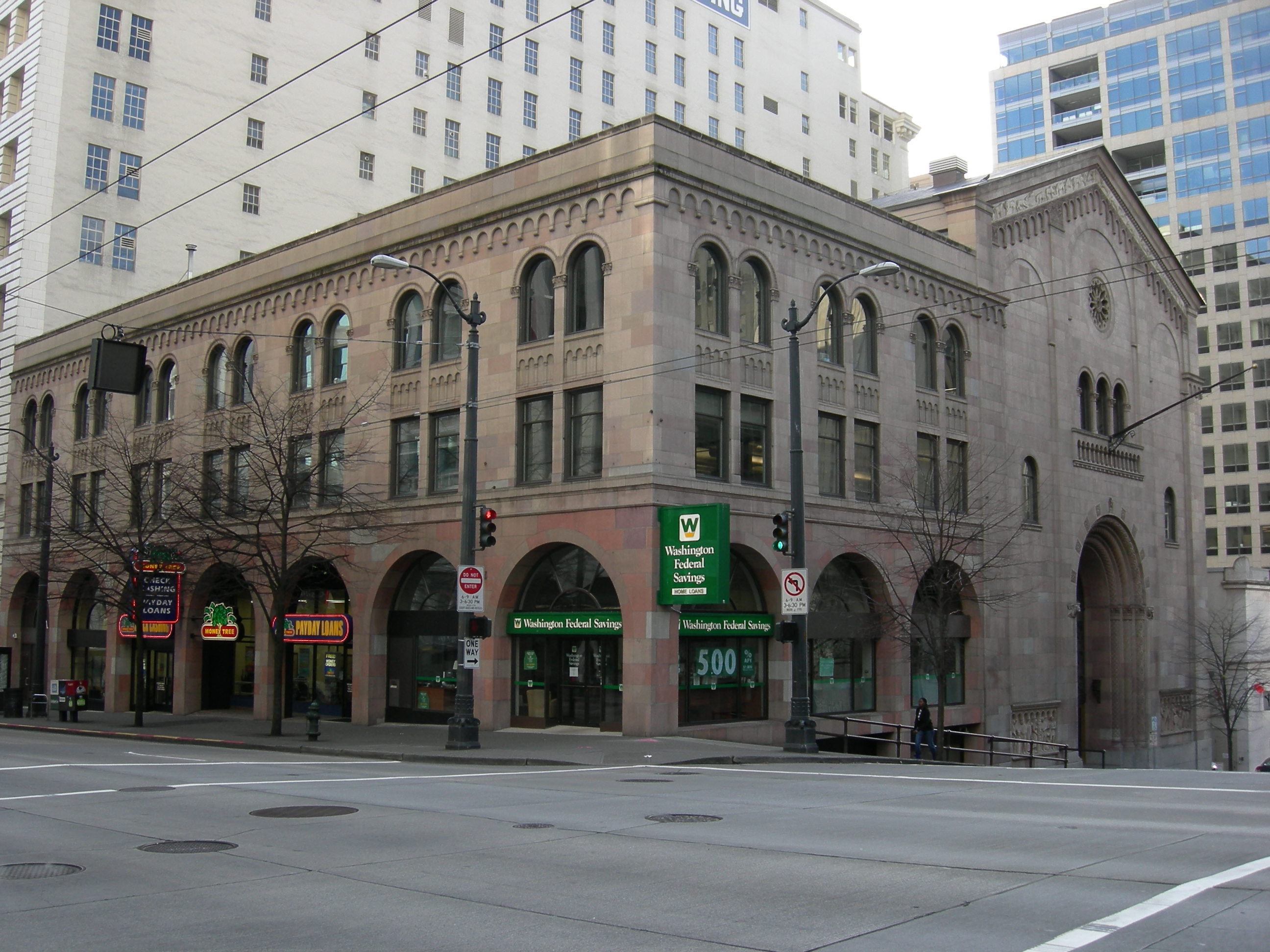
Former headquarters of the Seattle Chamber of Commerce, built 1924

The Seattle Metropolitan Chamber of Commerce is a private, membership-based organization that represents economic development and the economic interests of its corporate members in the metro region of Seattle, Washington, United States. Its members include most of the largest companies based in Seattle or have a significant presence there.

The organization was founded on April 17, 1882, by 26 businessmen looking to capture a lucrative mail route to Alaska. It was known as the Greater Seattle Chamber of Commerce until its current name was adopted in September 2011.

Since December 2025, the president and CEO of the Chamber has been Joe Nguyen, a former state senator and director of the Washington State Department of Commerce.

== See also ==
- Pioneer Square totem pole
- Los Angeles Chamber of Commerce
- Manhattan Chamber of Commerce
