= Joe Nguyen =

American politician from Washington

Director of the Washington State Department of Commerce
- In office January 15, 2025 – December 2025
- Governor: Bob Ferguson
- Preceded by: Mike Fong
- Succeeded by: Sarah Clifthorne

Member of the Washington Senate from the 34th district
- In office January 14, 2019 – January 15, 2025
- Preceded by: Sharon Nelson
- Succeeded by: Emily Alvarado

Personal details
- Born: Joseph-Thanh Nguyễn; September 27, 1983 (age 43) Seattle, Washington, U.S.
- Party: Democratic
- Spouse: Tallie Nguyen
- Education: Seattle University (BA)
- Website: sdc.wastateleg.org/nguyen

Joseph-Thanh Nguyễn (born September 27, 1983) is an American politician and business executive who served as a member of the Washington State Senate from 2019 to 2025. He was the director of the Washington State Department of Commerce from January 2025 to December 2025 and has been the president and chief executive officer of the Seattle Metropolitan Chamber of Commerce since January 2026. Nguyen is a second-generation Vietnamese American and worked for Expedia and Microsoft before entering politics.

== Early life and career ==
Nguyen was born in Seattle, Washington, as one of four children to a pair of Vietnamese immigrants who arrived in the United States as refugees. His family lived in public housing and relied on social services, particularly after his father became a quadriplegic in an accident. His mother worked as a seamstress, while Nguyen himself worked at his own high school as a janitor.

He graduated from John F. Kennedy Catholic High School in Burien after serving as class president for three years. Nguyen attended Seattle University and served as student body president for two years before graduating with Bachelor of Arts degrees in finance and humanities with a minor in economics. Nguyen worked as a senior strategist for Expedia and is a senior program manager at Microsoft with an emphasis on strategy and analytics. He has been involved in the company's charitable education program.

Nguyen chaired the Associate Board of Wellspring Family Services, a nonprofit organization for homeless services. During his time on the board, the state legislature passed trauma counseling legislation on behalf of Wellspring's lobbying. He also served on the King County Community Advisory Committee on Law Enforcement Oversight, which included criticism of the King County Sheriff's handling of the shooting of Tommy Le in June 2017. Le, a young Vietnamese American man, was shot by officers in Burien who were cleared of wrongdoing by an internal investigation of the Sheriff's Office, inciting outrage in the Vietnamese community. He volunteers at a local homeless encampment, Camp Second Chance, with his daughter.

== Political career ==
=== Elections ===
Nguyen announced his candidacy for the 34th district senate seat in May 2018, shortly after incumbent Sharon Nelson decided to retire at the end of her term. The 34th district includes White Center, West Seattle, Vashon Island, and part of Burien. He aimed to increase the representation of people of color in government and "for people here to realize they have the power, the authority, to actually make positive change", also launching a podcast series to attract other potential candidates. Nguyen finished at the top of the primary with 31 percent of the vote, ahead of ten other candidates, and advanced to the general election alongside Shannon Braddock, a staffer to King County Executive Dow Constantine, and later his successor.

Nguyen, who ran as a Democrat, campaigned on a platform that focused on housing affordability, healthcare for all, public transit improvements, environmental protections, and education reform. He received the endorsements of congresswoman Pramila Jayapal, several Seattle and Burien council members, various local unions, and The Stranger. His campaign declined to use PAC funding, raising half as much as Braddock's campaign. Nguyen won the general election on November 6, 2018, defeating Braddock with 58 percent of the vote. He became one of the first two Vietnamese American legislators to be elected to the Washington State Legislature, alongside My-Linh Thai from the 41st district.

In April 2021, he announced a campaign for King County Executive against three-term incumbent Dow Constantine. Constantine led Nguyen by 20 percentage points in the primary election; both candidates advanced to the general election. Nguyen lost in the general election with 44 percent of the vote.

=== Legislative tenure ===
In March 2020, Nguyen sponsored, and the legislature passed, a bill curtailing the use of facial recognition by the government and required government agencies to report facial recognition usage.

In April 2020, Nguyen sponsored, and the legislature passed, a bill expanding access to Washington State's Temporary Assistance for Needy Families Program, allowing families without regular housing to receive funds for more than the allotted 60 days.

In April 2021, Nguyen sponsored, and the legislature passed, a bill (SB 5055) transforming arbitration over police disciplinary actions in Washington state. Under the new framework, the Washington State Public Employment Relations Commission must create and appoint a roster of 9 to 18 new arbitrators who are then in charge of all discipline arbitrations for police covered by a collective bargaining agreement. The new law also provides more transparency to the public by collecting in one place all police discipline-related arbitrations and making those decisions available to the public.

=== Post-senate career ===
In December 2024, governor-elect Bob Ferguson announced that he intended to appoint Nguyen as the director of the State Department of Commerce. Nguyen resigned from the state senate on January 15, 2025, and took office as director the same day.

Nguyen announced in December 2025 that he intended to resign. He was appointed as the president and chief executive officer of the Seattle Metropolitan Chamber of Commerce in January 2026.

== Personal life ==
Nguyen is married to Tallie Nguyen, a special education teacher at the Highline Public Schools. They have three children and live in West Seattle.
