= Washington State Department of Licensing =

Government agency in U.S. state of Washington

Agency overview
- Formed: April 1, 1921
- Preceding agencies: Motor Vehicle License Division; Department of Motor Vehicles
- Jurisdiction: State of Washington
- Headquarters: 405 Black Lake Boulevard SW Olympia, Washington, U.S.; 47°02′39″N 122°55′38″W
- Employees: 1,487 (2024)
- Annual budget: $541 million (2024)
- Agency executive: Marcus Glasper, Director
- Website: dol.wa.gov

The Washington State Department of Licensing (DOL) is a department of the Washington state government that administers vehicle and vessel registration and issues driver's licenses. It also regulates licensing for certain professions, including architects, cosmetologists, geologists, private investigators, real estate brokers, and security guards. The agency also maintains a database of firearms transactions and ownership that is used by law enforcement in the state.

== History ==
The first body to regulate motor vehicle registration and driver licensing in Washington was the Motor Vehicle License Division, which was created by the Washington State Legislature in March 1905 and originally part of the Office of the Secretary of State. It was created five years after the first automobiles arrived in the state; the 1905 law required vehicle owners to pay a $2 fee and create their own license plates or paint numbers on the front and rear of the vehicle. The licenses were assigned in numerical order beginning with the first, which newspaper publisher Sam Perkins of Tacoma received on May 2, 1905. A total of 763 vehicle licenses were assigned in the first year. The state's first standardized license plates, which were colored blue with white letters, were issued in 1916 for 70,032 total vehicles.

The Department of Licenses was established on April 1, 1921, as one of several new state departments created to "promote efficiency, order and economy". It was tasked with the licensing of various professions, including accountants, architects, barbers, dentists, embalmers, nurses, optometrists, and pharmacists, and succeeded boards dedicated solely to those professions. The new department also handled the licensing of drivers of motor vehicles, which took effect August 1. Driver licenses were issued to persons at least 15 years old and only required two signatures and ten days of experience; a $1 fee was collected to fund the Highway Patrol, later renamed the State Patrol. An updated licensing law came into effect in August 1937, requiring drivers to pass a written exam of 25 questions overseen by the State Patrol; existing drivers were given two years to take the exam.

Proposals by legislators to reorganize the Department of Licenses and create a department of motor vehicles similar to other states were made in the late 1950s and early 1960s. The department replaced its file cabinets for record-keeping in the early 1960s as part of a minor reorganization. Outgoing governor Albert Rosellini and new governor Daniel Evans both endorsed a plan to create the Department of Motor Vehicles (DMV), which was approved by the state legislature in March 1965. The new DMV began operations on July 1, 1965, with 750 employees after absorbing 105 license examiners who previously worked for the State Patrol. It was organized into five bureaus (motor vehicles, driver services, administration, information systems, and professional licensing) and eleven divisions with approximately 100 locations across the state.

The DMV was renamed to the Department of Licensing (DOL) on July 1, 1977, to reflect the agency's roles beyond regulation of vehicles and motorists; the change was suggested by Rossalind Y. Woodhouse, who had been appointed in January to lead the department by Governor Dixy Lee Ray and was the first African American woman to hold a high state office in Washington. The following year, the state legislature passed a bill that reassigned some business licenses from the Department of Commerce to the DOL; it was the first part of a larger consolidation plan that would move more licensing functions from other departments. The DOL also took over hearings for traffic and motorist infractions that were previously handled by county superior courts. The licensing enforcement for healthcare professions were later moved to the new Department of Health in 1989.

The DOL adopted new policies in the late 1980s and early 1990s to focus on customer service, seeking to emulate the "Nordstrom approach" and improve their image; among these were switching to a longer, four-year renewal cycle for driver's licenses, reciprocal agreements for out-of-state licenses to skip road tests, and technology upgrades. Some of the agency's 62 offices were also renovated to replace aging rotary dial telephones, add upholstered seating, and install televisions that played music and videos of scenery. The license examiners also replaced their green uniforms, which were styled similar to a police officer's outfit, for a "softened" look. The DOL headquarters in Olympia were renovated between 1992 and 1996, during which $522,300 in computers and other equipment were reported missing.

In June 2023, the DOL began issuing temporary license plates for new vehicles to replace the former paper permit system that had been in use. The agency deployed an automated attendant system for its telephone hotline that was discovered to use Spanish-accented English instead of a Spanish-speaking voice. The incident was described as a "technical issue" by the DOL.

== Statistics ==
As of June 2024, the agency had 1,487 employees and a 2023–25 biennial budget of $541 million, collecting $3.3 billion in revenue from fees and taxes. The DOL has issued more than 6 million driver licenses and identification documents, and licenses for over 8 million vehicles and vessels. The agency has also licensed over 300 thousand businesses and individuals. The DOL's vehicle registration plates are offered in a standard design that features Mount Rainier as well as specialty designs that are sponsored by organizations, such as universities and sports teams. In 2025, there were 184,000 active specialty plates in use; the most popular design was for Washington State University.

== Organization ==
Marcus Glasper was appointed as the director of the DOL by governor Jay Inslee in 2023; he was previously the director of Washington's Lottery. The department is under the supervision of the Secretary of Transportation.

== See also ==
- Vehicle registration plates of Washington (state)
