= Washington State Department of Revenue =

State government agency

Logo for the department.

The Washington State Department of Revenue (DOR) is the primary tax agency of the U.S. state of Washington. It manages the collection and administration of 60 state taxes from Washington residents and businesses that fund the state government and its services; and also processes business licenses. As of June 2023, the agency had approximately 1,500 employees and a 2021–2023 biennium budget of $640.3 million. In the fiscal year 2023, $33.2 billion in revenue from over 606,000 registered businesses was collected by the agency, in addition to $7.7 billion from local revenue sources.

== Functions and responsibilities ==
The DOR manages and collects the 60 types of taxes in state of Washington. These include business and occupation, public utility, and sales and use taxes, as well as the capital gains, timber, cigarette and tobacco, property, leasehold, estate, and other tax programs. The agency also processes business licenses and develops tax legislation.

Since 2021, the Working Families Tax Credit program has provided a state tax reimbursement to low-to-moderate income individuals who meet certain eligibility requirements. As of December 31, 2023, over 163,000 refunds had been issued out of an estimated pool of 360,000 eligible residents. The DOR also manages an unclaimed property program that returns unused funds from bank accounts, life insurance policies, customer overpayments, and uncashed checks. By 2018, there was $1.3 billion in unclaimed funds tracked by the DOR after an amnesty period for businesses had expired.

=== Tribal relations ===
The Tribal Partnerships Program manages the DOR's inter-government relations with the 29 federally recognized Tribal Nations in Washington. The DOR has signed compacts with 11 tribes:

- Confederated Tribes of the Chehalis Reservation
- Cowlitz Indian Tribe
- Kalispel Tribe of Indians
- Lummi Indian Nation
- Nisqually Indian Tribe
- Puyallup Tribe of Indians
- Squaxin Island Tribe
- Stillaguamish Tribe of Indians
- Suquamish Tribe
- Swinomish Indian Tribal Community
- Tulalip Tribes

The Tribal Partnerships Program also provides legal and policy support on tribal issues, handles present and future compacting, provides taxpayer education to those doing business in Indian Country, and educates agency staff on tribal cultural norms.

== Organization ==
The director of the Department of Revenue is Drew Shirk, appointed by governor Jay Inslee in 2023.

DOR has 15 divisions: administrative review and hearings; audit; business and financial services; compliance; customer experience and communications; executive; human resources; information services; interpretations and technical advice; legislation and policy; property tax; research and fiscal analysis; taxpayer account administration; taxpayer services; and Working Families Tax Credit.

== History ==
The Department of Revenue was established on July 1, 1967, following the state legislature's decision in 1965 to abolish the existing three-member Washington Tax Commission, which had been operating since 1905. This change was part of an effort to modernize and streamline the tax collection system.

In 1981, voters approved an initiative repealing inheritance and gift taxes, replacing it with an estate tax equal to the amount of federal tax credit. During the 1982 legislative session, a major restructuring of local government finance took place. To obtain additional sales tax authority, cities had to place a cap on utility tax rates, and cities and counties had to accept limitations on system development charges. Sales tax equalization was also introduced, redistributing a portion of revenue to small tax-base jurisdictions.

In 1987, the U.S. Supreme Court ruled that Business & Occupation (B&O) taxes on certain interstate transactions were unconstitutional. Following the decision, Washington state repealed the multiple activities exemption and introduced credits for B&O taxes paid outside Washington, allowing businesses to offset taxes on in-state manufacturing against those for in-state sales. In 1997, the legislature clarified the B&O tax law on certain internet services, including email, information retrieval, and hosting of information online.

In 1998, voters approved Initiative 695, which repealed the motor vehicle excise tax and mandated a flat $30 tab fee. It was overturned by the Washington Supreme Court a year later.

In 2001, the legislature began phasing out the federal estate tax by 2010 and reduced the state tax credit by 25 percent each year, eliminating the state credit by the end of 2004. In 2007, Washington adopted the Streamlined Sales Tax Agreement (SSTA), effective July 1, 2008, to simplify tax collection and improve compliance, particularly for remote and interstate sales. The state also authorized a new local sales tax to support the Health Services Authority, which aimed to fund local healthcare initiatives.

In 2009, DOR began requiring electronic filing and payment of excise taxes for all taxpayers who file monthly. Also, reseller permits replaced resale certificate for wholesale purchasers. During a three-month period in 2011, DOR conducted its first amnesty program, allowing taxpayers to pay any outstanding taxes without associated penalties and interest. The program ultimately generated an estimated $345.8 million in revenue and waived $91 million in penalties and interest.

In 2011, the Master License Service (MLS), the one-stop business license center that had helped business owners register with various state agencies since its creation in 1977, was transferred from Department of Licensing to DOR and rebranded as Business Licensing Service (BLS). In April 2015, DOR signed a contract with Fast Enterprises to begin the Tax and Licensing Systems Replacement (TLSR) project to modernize the agency's tax and business licensing systems. In 2018, Revenue launched the My DOR portal, where taxpayers could register, file, and pay electronically. The Automated Tax and Licensing Administration System (ATLAS) and ATLAS Management Program (AMP) also began.

Washington's Marketplace Fairness Law went into effect on January 1, 2018, requiring out-of-state businesses without a physical presence to make a choice to either collect sales tax or follow use tax notification and reporting requirements.

In response to the COVID-19 pandemic, the DOR closed its offices to the public in March 2020 and transitioned 1,200 employees to remote working. Services continued online and by phone until the DOR reopened its public offices in February 2022.

The Tribal Partnerships Program was commissioned in 2020. In 2021, the Working Families Tax Credit was funded by legislation. The program started in 2023. The 2021 legislative session also saw the passing of SB 5096, which established a 7% capital gains tax on individual profits exceeding $250,000. A Douglas County Superior Court judge ruled the tax unconstitutional in 2022, but in 2023, the state Supreme Court overruled this ruling upon appeal. Initiative No. 2109 (I-2109), a ballot initiative to repeal SB 5096, will appear on the ballot on November 5, 2024.
