= Capital gains tax in Washington (state) =

In the U.S. state of Washington, a capital gains tax of 7% is levied on profits from the sale or exchange of personal long-term capital assets such as stocks, bonds, business interests, or other investments and tangible assets over $262,000. Several types of assets are exempt from the tax including real estate, assets held in retirement accounts, livestock, timberlands, commercial fishing privileges, and goodwill from the sale of an auto dealership. The tax differs from capital gains taxes at the federal level and many states which tax broadly tax both tangible assets such as property as well as intangible assets such as stocks and bonds.

Revenue from the tax goes toward education, childcare, early learning, and school construction. In its first two years the tax paid for 171 school construction projects though the Common School Construction Account including $3.8 million for additional classrooms in the Lummi School District, $1.6 million for the Whatcom County Skills Center, and four school construction projects, totaling $2.29 million in Skagit County. The capital gains tax also pays for the Fair Start for Kids Act, which the "Budget & Policy Center also credits the capital gains tax with contributing to a roughly $350 million increase in state funding for child care and early learning programs in the current two-year budget," creating more than 10,000 affordable childcare openings.

== History ==
Prior to the passage of the capital gains tax, Washington State had the most regressive tax system of any state in the US. The wealthiest 1% paid just 3% of their income in state taxes, while the poorest 20% paid 17.8%. Advocates had long proposed a capital gains tax in order to help reduce this gap. During the 2021 legislative session, legislators introduced SB 5096 enacting a 7% capital gains tax on profits from the sale of assets such as stocks and bonds over $250,000, adjust for inflation. Polling showed that the proposal had broad support with 59% in favor and 30% opposed. Small business owners, economic policy experts, and people who would pay a capital gains tax supported the legislation. Adrienne Stuart, a wealthy Pierce county resident, wrote in The Tacoma News Tribune, "Legislators: Tax me!”

On May 4, 2021, Governor Jay Inslee signed SB 5096 into law. Two days later, Inslee signed the Fair Start for Kids Act, which provides childcare subsidies for working families in Washington State. The subsidies are funded in part by revenues from the capital gains tax.

The tax collected more than $890 million in revenue in its first year, significantly exceeding the approximately $500 million in revenue initially projected. The Department of Revenue projects the tax will bring in over $5 billion over the next 6 years. Fewer than 4000 people pay the tax, and 85% of the revenue comes from King County.

== Attempts to repeal ==
Following the tax's passage, the Freedom Foundation, a right-wing think tank, filed a lawsuit against Washington State challenging the tax's constitutionality on behalf of five plaintiffs subject to the tax, including Chris Quinn, the owner of the investment firm Cherry Hill Investments. Parents, teachers, and the Edmonds School District joined the case as interveners to defend the law.

In March 2022, a Douglas County Superior Court judge sided with the plaintiffs ruling that the tax was an income tax and therefore unconstitutional in Washington State. This ruling was overturned by the Washington State Supreme Court in March 2023, which ruled that the tax was an excise tax, rather than an income tax. The Supreme Court of the United States declined to hear an appeal by the plaintiffs.

Opponents of the tax filed an initiative in 2022 to repeal it in 2022 but failed to gather the required number of signatures to make it onto the ballot.

In 2024, hedge fund manager Brian Heywood launched a campaign entitled Let's Go Washington to promote six initiatives, including the November 5, 2024 Initiative 2109, which would repeal the capital gains tax. I-2109 would "decrease funding for K-12 education, higher education, school construction, early learning, and childcare." Heywood spent $6 million of his own money gathering signatures for the initiatives. Parents, teachers, and children's groups endorsed the No on 2109 campaign opposing the initiative's passage. The Seattle Times Editorial Board wrote "As voters mark their ballots in the coming weeks, they should put preserving Washington’s future above preserving millionaires’ fortunes." I-2109 sponsor, State GOP Chair Jim Walsh, lost a lawsuit to hide I-2109's fiscal impacts from voters. Initiative I-2109 was defeated, with a 64.11% No vote.
