= Washington Student Achievement Council =

Government organization in Olympia, United States

Logo for the agency.

The Washington Student Achievement Council (WSAC) is the Washington State Government agency overseeing higher education in the state of Washington. It consists of a nine-member citizen board and an associated cabinet-level agency.

WSAC was created on July 1, 2012, when it received the duties of the former Washington State Higher Education Coordinating Board with the passage and enactment of HB 2483.
