= Health districts in Washington =

Most health departments in the U.S. state of Washington are part of county government. The following districts are exceptions:

- Benton-Franklin Health District (Benton and Franklin counties)
- Chelan-Douglas Health District (Chelan and Douglas counties)
- Northeast Tri County Health District (Ferry County, Pend Oreille, and Stevens counties)
- Yakima Health District is a one-county health district. It was created in 1911 and was one of the first health districts in the United States.

Health districts were enabled by the Washington State Legislature in 1945, codified in chapter 70.46 of the Revised Code of Washington (RCW).
