= Washington State Department of Health =

Washington state agency, headquartered in Olympia, Washington

Agency overview
- Formed: May 31, 1989
- Jurisdiction: State of Washington
- Employees: approx. 3,500 (2024)
- Annual budget: approx. $1.2 billion (2024)
- Agency executive: Dennis Worsham, Secretary of Health
- Website: doh.wa.gov

The Washington State Department of Health is a state agency of Washington. It is headquartered in Olympia, Washington. The agency was created by the state legislature in May 1989 after splitting from the Washington State Department of Social and Health Services.

As of 2024, the agency had approximately 3,500 employees and a budget of approximately $1.2 billion; of which $188 million was from COVID-19 funds, $297 million from federal sources, $292 million from the State's general fund, $166 million from fees, and $295 million from other sources.

== Birth control ==
States have historically provided a conscience clause right allowing pharmacists to refrain from participating in abortions. In June 2006, the Pharmacy Board of the Washington State Department of Health rejected a draft rule proposed by Governor Christine Gregoire to require all pharmacies to begin carrying Plan B levonorgestrel. Governor Gregoire responded by releasing a public statement warning the Board members to reconsider or they could be removed. In July 2006, the Washington State Human Rights Commission warned the Board members that they would be personally liable for illegally discriminating against women if they did not pass the Governor's Plan B rule. In April 2007, the Board approved a final rule prohibiting pharmacies from not stocking Plan B for religious reasons but allowing exemptions for "good faith" business reasons.

When Ralph's Thriftway, a grocery store in Olympia, refused for religious reasons to carry Plan B, it was widely boycotted, leading Gregoire to cancel the grocer's longstanding account with the Washington Governor's Mansion. The only complaints for violating the Plan B rule were filed against the grocer. The grocer sued but, instead of alleging violations of the broader Constitution of Washington, its attorneys at the Alliance Defending Freedom and the Becket Fund for Religious Liberty only filed under the Free Exercise Clause of the United States Constitution.

On November 8, 2007, U.S. District Judge Ronald B. Leighton granted the grocer a preliminary injunction blocking the rule. On May 1, 2008, United States Court of Appeals for the Ninth Circuit Judges Thomas G. Nelson and Jay Bybee denied the state a stay of the injunction pending appeal, over a dissent by Judge A. Wallace Tashima. However, on July 8, 2009, Circuit Judge Kim McLane Wardlaw, joined by Richard Clifton and N. Randy Smith reversed the preliminary injunction.

On February 22, 2012, after four years of discovery and a twelve-day bench trial, Judge Leighton issued a permanent injunction blocking the Plan B rule as unconstitutional. On July 23, 2015, Circuit Judge Susan P. Graber, joined by Judges Mary H. Murguia and Richard Clifton reversed. The grocer's petition for certiorari from the Supreme Court of the United States was denied on June 28, 2016. Justice Samuel Alito, joined by Chief Justice John Roberts and Justice Clarence Thomas, dissented, writing that "the rules challenged here reflect antipathy towards religious beliefs that do not accord with the views of those holding the levers of government power."

== Public Records Act ==
In Harris v. Quinn (2014) the Supreme Court of the United States gave home healthcare workers the right to not join their union. The Freedom Foundation reacted by filing a Public Record Act request for a list of home healthcare workers from the Department so it could encourage the workers to leave the union. The Department refused, then encouraged the Service Employees International Union to sue the Department to prevent the disclosure.

The SEIU lost its lawsuit in the superior, appeals, and Washington Supreme Court. The SEIU responded by putting Washington Initiative 1501 on the Washington elections, 2016 ballot, which would change the Public Record Act to forbid departments from disclosing union members' names. The ballot initiative was approved with 70% of the vote.

== Gender X ==
From January 27, 2018 "gender X" will be legally available by regulations from existing Washington State Department of Health records only, to amend birth certificates.

== 2020 Coronavirus pandemic ==
In early March 2020, coronavirus cases within Washington state grew along with the rest of the country. Washington State Department of Health officials requested, from the federal government's Strategic National Stockpile (the U.S. government's repository of drugs, vaccines and equipment to be used in major public health emergencies), 233,000 respirators and 200,000 surgical masks. The initial federal response was disappointing. The SNS could provide only 93,600 N95 respirators and 100,200 surgical masks. After public criticism, the federal government announced it would deliver all of the requested items to Washington state.
