= 2024 Washington Initiative 2109 =

Proposed repeal of state capital gains tax

Initiative 2109
- November 5, 2024
- This measure would repeal an excise tax imposed on the sale or exchange of certain long-term capital assets by individuals who have annual capital gains of over $250,000.

Results
Choice	Votes	%
✔ Yes	1,364,510	35.89%
✖ No	2,437,419	64.11%
Valid votes	3,801,929	100.00%
Invalid or blank votes	0	0.00%
Total votes	3,801,929	100.00%

Yes
90–100%
80–90%
70–80%
60–70%
50–60%
No
90–100%
80–90%
70–80%
60–70%
50–60%
Other
Tie
No votes

Initiative No. 2109 (I-2109) was a failed ballot initiative in the U.S. State of Washington that appeared on the ballot on November 5, 2024. The initiative was brought to the state legislature by Let's Go Washington, a Redmond-based political action committee founded by businessman and hedge-fund manager Brian Heywood. The initiative would have repealed SB 5096, which created a 7% capital gains tax on the sale of long-term capital assets (i.e. stocks, bonds and business interests) worth more than $250,000 in Washington state since 2021. Real estate sales are already exempt from the tax.

The effort to repeal I-2109 began in 2023, following a ruling of the Washington Supreme Court upholding the constitutionality of the capital gains tax. I-2109 collected a total of 436,474 signatures, and was ultimately certified and introduced to the legislature for their 2024 legislative session. Senate majority leader Andy Billig (D) and Speaker of the House Laurie Jenkins (D) announced on February 16, 2024, that the state legislature would not hold hearings on the initiative. This decision not to take action on the referred initiative placed the decision on the question to the November 5, 2024 election.

== Background ==
The genesis for what eventually became the capital gains tax was proposed in the budget presented by Gov. Jay Inslee on December 17, 2020. The 2021 budget proposal included a proposed 9% tax on capital gains, something Democrats in the state legislature had sought to pass in previous years but has lacked the votes to pass. The proposed tax was first introduced into the state Senate, with a first reading and referral to the Ways & Means committee occurring on January 11, 2021. The revised proposal was passed from the committee on February 16, and then passed the rules committee two days later. The revised tax proposal, which reduced the tax rate from 9% to 7%, passed the Senate on March 6 after what the Seattle Times described as a "fierce debate" by a vote of 25–24. The legislation was given a first reading in the House on March 9, passing out of the Finance committee on April 16 and passing the state legislature on April 21 by a vote of 52–46. At that time, the legislature removed language from the bill that would have referred the capital gains tax bill to the voters as a referendum.

Governor Jay Inslee signed SB 5096 into law on May 4, 2021, and the capital gains tax became effective on July 25, 2021. However, before the law had been signed, a group of seven state residents, working with a Seattle law firm and the conservative think tank, the Freedom Foundation, filed a lawsuit in the Douglas County Superior Court claiming that the capital gains tax constituted an illegal income tax. A second lawsuit was filed on May 20, 2021, by former Attorney General Rob McKenna, also in Douglas County Superior Court. The two cases were consolidated and, on March 2, 2022, Douglas County Superior Court Judge Brian Huber sided with the plaintiffs and struck down the capital gains tax as an illegal income tax. On appeal, the state Supreme Court overturned the district court ruling in a 7–2 decision, upholding the constitutionality of the capital gains tax as an excise tax. On January 24, 2024, the US Supreme Court declined to hear an appeal of the state Supreme Court decision.

The libertarian-leaning hedge fund manager Brian Heywood spearheaded a second effort to remove the capital gains tax by initiative, founding and bankrolling the Let's Go Washington PAC to coordinate the gathering of signatures after failing to qualify any initiatives related to the capital gains tax in 2022 on a volunteer basis. The capital gains tax repeal initiative, along with five other initiative efforts, submitted their signatures to the Secretary of State in December 2023 as initiatives to the legislature. The Secretary of State's office certified that a sufficient number of signatures had been gathered on January 23, 2024, which referred the issue to the state legislature. On January 24, I-2109 was introduced to the House (referred to the Finance committee) and the Senate (referred to the Ways & Means committee), but no subsequent action was taken on the initiative by those committees. Rep. Jim Walsh (R) was the sponsor for the bill in the legislature. Democratic leaders told reporters in February that the state legislature would not be moving forward with I-2109, putting the initiative on track for a public vote on November 5, 2024.

== Language and impact ==
I-2109 placed the following question before the citizens of Washington:

Initiative Measure No. 2109 concerns taxes.

This measure would repeal an excise tax imposed on the sale or exchange of certain long-term capital assets by individuals who have annual capital gains of over $250,000.

Should this measure be enacted into law? Yes [ ] No [ ]

In 2023, the first full year of implementation for SB 5096, the tax brought in $786 million in new revenues to the state, though as of May 15, 2024 the tax is estimated to have brought in $433 million for 2024. The majority of the money brought in under the capital gains tax comes from King County, with about 84% of all net payments coming from King County residents. The tax has been paid by a total of 3,354 individuals, with the top 10 tax payers comprising 56% of the total amount of taxes paid to date. The state Office of Financial Management estimates that a repeal of SB 5096 would cut about $833 million in anticipated tax revenues from the projected 2025 budget. Supporters and opponents of I-2109 have clashed over whether a 2022 law covering the impact initiatives could have on the state budget applied to this initiative, though the state Supreme Court ruled in August that the law permitted disclosure of budget impacts in the official explanations of the initiative in the November voter's guide.

== Support for I-2109 ==
As of September 17, 2024, Let's Go Washington and the Taxpayers Accountability Alliance were registered as sponsors of the initiative. Additionally, the Association of Washington Businesses has endorsed I-2109. Representative Jim Walsh (R), the current chair of the Republican Party of Washington, is also a supporter of I-2109. Furthermore, the Washington Bankers Association supported the initiative.

== Opposition to I-2109 ==
As of September 17, 2024, the No on 2109 Committee, Stop Greed PAC, the SEIU 775 Ballot Fund, Protect Washington, Fuse Voters, and the 45th District Democrats were registered as opponents of the initiative. Additionally, the progressive-aligned Invest in Washington Now PAC had been vocal in their opposition to I-2109, as has the Children's Alliance. Opposition to the initiative also came from the Washington Progress Fund, Moms Rising Together and the League of Women Voters of Washington. Various labor and community organizations also supported a “No” vote, including the National Education Association and the Washington Federation of State Employees.

== Public opinion on I-2109 ==
Poll	Sponsor	Dates	Margin of Error	Mode	Sample Size	Support	Oppose	Undecided
SurveyUSA	Seattle Times, KING-TV, & UW Center for an Informed Public	Oct 9–14, 2024	± 5%	Online	703 LV	27%	55%	18%
Elway	Cascade PBS	Oct 8–12, 2024	± 5%	Live Phone & Text	401 LV	29%	56%	15%
Elway	Cascade PBS	Sept 3–6, 2024	± 5%	Live Phone & Text	403 RV	30%	52%	18%
SurveyUSA	Seattle Times, KING-TV, & UW Center for an Informed Public	July 10–13, 2024	± 5%	Online	708 LV	46%	23%	31%
Scott Rasmussen National Survey		May 20–23, 2024	± 3.5%		800 RV	57%	32%	12%
Elway	Cascade PBS	May 13–16, 2024	± 5%	Live Phone & Text	403 RV	47%	36%	17%
GBAO Strategies	Defend Washington	April 11–14, 2024	± 4%	Live Phone & Text	600 LV	32%	62%	6%

== Results ==
I-2109 failed to pass, receiving fewer than 36% of the vote in the November general election.

2024 Washington Initiative 2109
Choice	Votes	%
For	1,364,510	35.89
Against	2,437,419	64.11
Total	3,801,929	100.00
Source: Washington Secretary of State

=== By county ===
County results
County	No		Yes		Margin		Total votes
County	#	%	#	%	#	%	Total votes
Adams	2,637	50.63%	2,571	49.37%	66	1.27%	5,208
Asotin	6,445	57.98%	4,670	42.02%	1,775	15.97%	11,115
Benton	50,237	51.17%	47,942	48.83%	2,295	2.34%	98,179
Chelan	23,095	56.42%	17,836	43.58%	5,259	12.85%	40,931
Clallam	30,037	63.86%	16,997	36.14%	13,040	27.72%	47,034
Clark	162,906	61.58%	101,623	38.42%	61,283	23.17%	264,529
Columbia	1,162	48.42%	1,238	51.58%	-76	-3.17%	2,400
Cowlitz	32,180	56.11%	25,172	43.89%	7,008	12.22%	57,352
Douglas	10,842	52.75%	9,710	47.25%	1,132	5.51%	20,552
Ferry	2,043	51.29%	1,940	48.71%	103	2.59%	3,983
Franklin	15,464	51.49%	14,568	48.51%	896	2.98%	30,032
Garfield	614	46.13%	717	53.87%	-103	-7.74%	1,331
Grant	17,336	49.76%	17,504	50.24%	-168	-0.48%	34,840
Grays Harbor	21,903	59.74%	14,760	40.26%	7,143	19.48%	36,663
Island	31,806	63.54%	18,248	36.46%	13,558	27.09%	50,054
Jefferson	18,266	75.52%	5,922	24.48%	12,344	51.03%	24,188
King	796,545	72.43%	303,196	27.57%	493,349	44.86%	1,099,741
Kitsap	100,257	65.54%	52,714	34.46%	47,543	31.08%	152,971
Kittitas	13,585	52.81%	12,138	47.19%	1,447	5.63%	25,723
Klickitat	7,644	57.80%	5,582	42.20%	2,062	15.59%	13,226
Lewis	21,849	49.53%	22,267	50.47%	-418	-0.95%	44,116
Lincoln	3,062	43.95%	3,905	56.05%	-843	-12.10%	6,967
Mason	21,185	59.17%	14,618	40.83%	6,567	18.34%	35,803
Okanogan	11,809	58.46%	8,392	41.54%	3,417	16.92%	20,201
Pacific	8,715	63.29%	5,056	36.71%	3,659	26.57%	13,771
Pend Oreille	4,120	49.78%	4,157	50.22%	-37	-0.45%	8,277
Pierce	260,266	61.36%	163,884	38.64%	96,382	22.72%	424,150
San Juan	9,276	73.80%	3,293	26.20%	5,983	47.60%	12,569
Skagit	41,182	60.36%	27,044	39.64%	14,138	20.72%	68,226
Skamania	3,929	55.64%	3,132	44.36%	797	11.29%	7,061
Snohomish	254,975	63.03%	149,563	36.97%	105,412	26.06%	404,538
Spokane	163,834	58.84%	114,607	41.16%	49,227	17.68%	278,441
Stevens	11,969	43.67%	15,436	56.33%	-3,467	-12.65%	27,405
Thurston	106,693	66.68%	53,313	33.32%	53,380	33.36%	160,006
Wahkiakum	1,705	57.33%	1,269	42.67%	436	14.66%	2,974
Walla Walla	17,007	59.07%	11,783	40.93%	5,224	18.15%	28,790
Whatcom	89,526	67.03%	44,036	32.97%	45,490	34.06%	133,562
Whitman	12,612	64.72%	6,875	35.28%	5,737	29.44%	19,487
Yakima	48,701	56.94%	36,832	43.06%	11,869	13.88%	85,533
Totals	2,437,419	64.11%	1,364,510	35.89%	1,072,909	28.22%	3,801,929

== External sources ==
I-2109 Ballot Letter (via the WA Secretary of State)

Initiative Measure No. 2109 (via the WA Secretary of State)
