= Washington State Department of Labor and Industries =

Government agency in Washington state

Agency overview
- Formed: 1921
- Jurisdiction: State of Washington
- Headquarters: 7273 Linderson Way SW, Tumwater, Washington
- Employees: 3,311 (2024)
- Annual budget: $2.7 billion (2015–25)
- Agency executive: Joel Sacks, Director
- Website: lni.wa.gov

The Washington State Department of Labor and Industries (L&I) is a department of the Washington state government that regulates and enforces labor standards. The agency administers the state's workers' compensation system, conducts workplace inspections, licenses and certifies trade workers, and issues permits for heavy machinery.

== History ==
The Department of Labor and Industries was created by an act of the state legislature in 1921, overseeing industrial insurance, worker safety, and industrial relations. The new agency superseded the Bureau of Labor, created in 1901 to inspect workplaces, and minor state boards and commissions monitoring worker health, safety, and insurance claims.

In 1973, the state legislature passed the Washington Industrial Safety and Health Act (WISHA), which superseded the federal Occupational Safety and Health Act (OSHA) and allowed L&I greater powers to investigate employers and enforce state and federal labor laws. Washington became one of the first states to implement their own labor laws, which received full approval from OSHA in 1976.

In 2006, the WISHA Services Division was renamed the Division of Occupational Safety and Health (DOSH). Through WISHA, DOSH has the authority to set and enforce worker healthy and safety requirements. DOSH enforces standards through both consultation and compliance inspections. In compliance inspections while representing the worker, DOSH will inspect for situations of imminent danger, fatality, catastrophe, serious injuries leading to hospitalization, and complaints and referrals. They also conduct scheduled and follow-up compliance inspections. DOSH is now the entity that is considered the state plan, complying with existing federal standards until they adopt their own comparable standards for the state alone.

== Leadership History ==
Executive Directors of Washington State L&I
Term	Name
1995-2002	Gary Moore
2003-2004	Paul Trause
2005-2006	Gary Weeks
2007-2012	Judy Schurke
2013-present	Joel Sacks

== Structure ==
L&I has a budget of $2.7 billion for the term of 2015–2025. As of December 2024, L&I had 3,311 full-time employees. The department is divided into several divisions, including DOSH, Workers' Compensation, Field and Public Safety, and Fraud Prevention and Labor Standards. The department's director is appointed by the state governor and serves in the executive cabinet.

== Offices ==
In addition to its headquarters in Tumwater, L&I has offices in 18 other cities across the state.
