= Washington State Law Against Discrimination =

The Washington State Law Against Discrimination (also known as WLAD) is a set of laws (specifically, RCW 49.60) designed to protect individuals in the U.S. state of Washington from discrimination.
