= Washington State Office of Financial Management =

The Washington State Office of Financial Management is a nonpartisan operational arm of the Washington State government which supplies fiscal services, policy support, and vital information to state agencies and the legislature of the state, including the governor.

The office provides executive budget oversight, policy and reporting, and research on population, economics, and workforce. The organization publishes statistics in various categories for the state.

The office was created in 1979 and took over activities from the Planning and Community Affairs agency and the Central Budget Agency. Its roles, duties, and strcture are described by RCW 43.41.

As of December, 2025, the director is K. D. Chapman-See.
