= Washington State Department of Financial Institutions =

US Government Department

Agency logo

Washington State Department of Financial Institutions is an agency of the State of Washington charged with regulating financial institutions including banks, and prevention of financial fraud such as bank fraud, credit card fraud and payday loan issues. It is authorized by Revised Code of Washington (RCW) Title 43, Chapter 320.

The agency regulates the following types of institutions: under the Division of Credit Unions, credit unions; under the Division of Banks, state-chartered commercial banks, (Note: In 2010, 70 regulated, state-chartered banks held one third of deposits in Washington.) savings banks, savings associations and non-depositary trust companies; under the Division of Consumer Services non-depositary mortgage lenders, servicers and brokers, consumer lenders, and money services businesses; under the Division of Securities, issuers of private placement equity, debt securities, and derivatives products, securities and derivatives broker-dealers, investment advisers, and franchisors.
