= Washington State Department of Social and Health Services =

Social services agency in Washington State, USA

Department overview
- Employees: 18,000
- Annual budget: $25 billion (bi-annual)
- Website: www.dshs.wa.gov

The Department of Social and Health Services (DSHS) is a social services department in Washington State. The agency provides assistance to 2 million people with programs such as the Supplemental Nutritional Assistance Program, Temporary Assistance for Needy Families, and the Office of Refugee and Immigrant Assistance.

On August 14, 2025, Governor Bob Ferguson appointed Angela Ramirez, former chief of staff at the U.S. Department of Health and Human Services, as the secretary of the agency with an annual salary of $258,744. She will oversee 18,000 full-time staff and a bi-annual budget of $25 billion.

Classic logo in use until 2024.

== See also ==
- Wenatchee child abuse prosecutions
