= Washington State Department of Commerce =

Government organization in Washington, United States

Agency overview
- Headquarters: Olympia, Washington
- Employees: 735 (2024)
- Annual budget: $10.5 billion (2025-26)
- Agency executive: Sarah Clifthorne, Director (interim)
- Website: commerce.wa.gov

The Washington State Department of Commerce is a state agency in Washington. Based in the state's capitol, Olympia, Washington, the agency is responsible for community and economic development. The agency manages several boards and commissions with a focus on businesses, local governments, tribes, and community-based organizations.

As of 2024, the agency had approx. 735 employees and a $10.5 billion budget for the 2025-2026 biennium.

== Divisions ==
The Department of Commerce has five main divisions: Housing, Energy, Local Government, Economic Development, and Community Services.

- Housing works on programs related to homeownership and residential stability through the Department of Commerce’s Homeownership Unit. Its activities include providing capital funding for housing development and administering programs that assist individuals facing foreclosure or displacement due to the closure of manufactured home communities.
- Energy analyzes statewide energy issues, develops initiatives aligned with state energy policies, offers policy support and public information, and administers energy-related grants for eligible entities.
- Local Government services include financial and technical assistance for local governments, as well as support for nonprofits, community organizations, and tribes. Programs in this area provide funding for broadband expansion, public infrastructure, community and economic development, growth management planning, behavioral health facilities, early learning facilities, and other community projects that address local and regional needs.
- Economic Development supports key industries, expanding international trade, assisting small businesses, offering workforce training programs, increasing access to funding opportunities, and coordinating with local economic development partners across all Washington counties.
- The Key Industries / Community Services Division focuses on community programs and services through partnerships with local governments, tribes, community action agencies, nonprofits, and community-based organizations.

== Rulemaking ==
Rulemaking is a process used by government agencies to develop regulations that implement state laws and adjust state programs as conditions change.

== History ==
Mike Fong, the former deputy mayor of Seattle and a regional director of the U.S. Small Business Administration, was appointed as head of the department in April 2023.

In December 2024, Governor-elect Bob Ferguson appointed State Senator Joe Nguyen to succeed Mike Fong as the agency's director. He resigned in December 2025 to become the president of the Seattle Metropolitan Chamber of Commerce; Sarah Clifthorne was appointed as interim director in January 2026.

In June 2025, the agency underwent organizational restructuring, terminating 24 employees, dissolving its equity team and extending a pause on hiring due to budget shortfalls.
