= Vehicle registration plates of Washington (state) =

Washington vehicle license plates

Washington
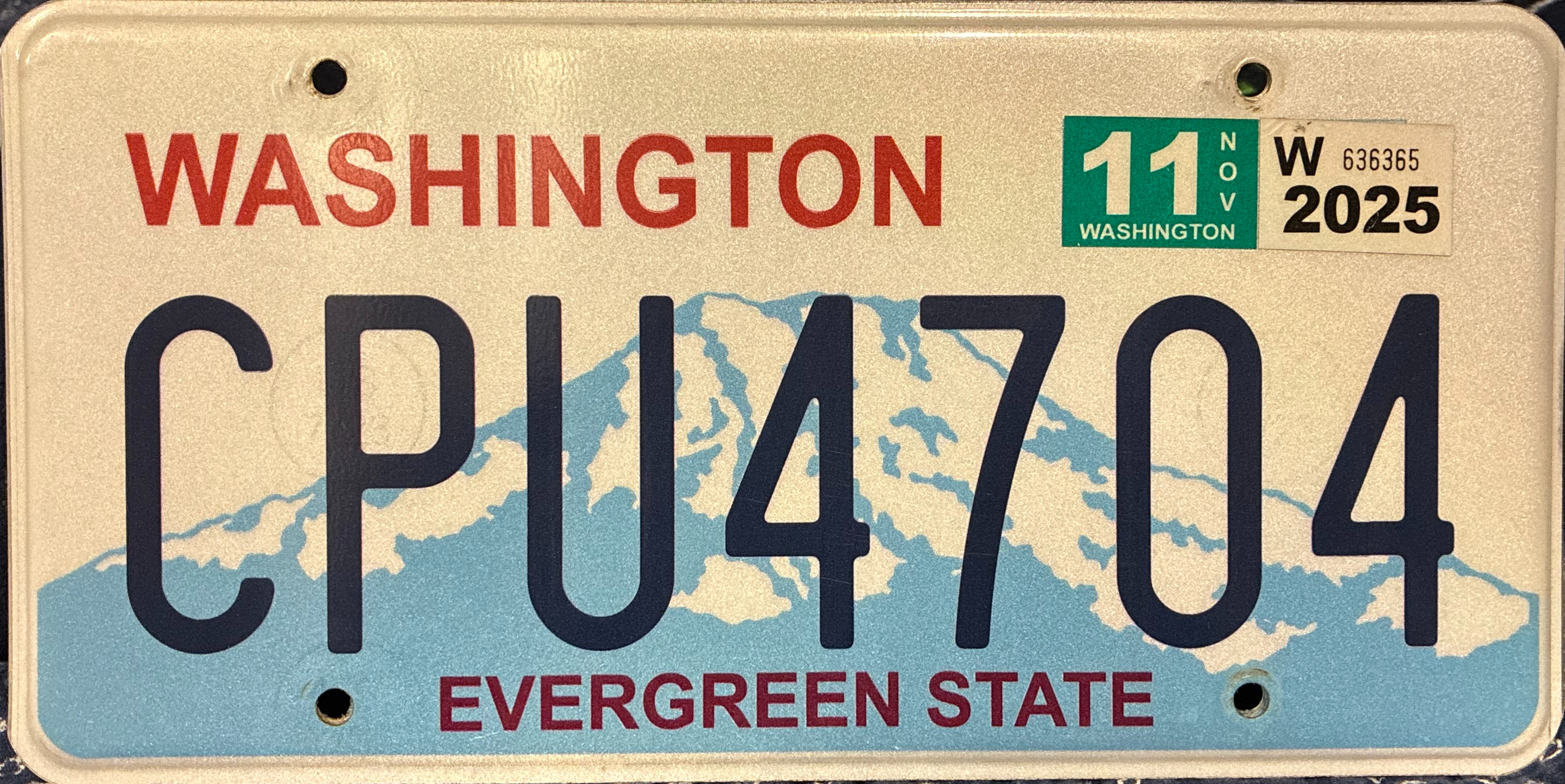

Current series
- Slogan: Evergreen State
- Size: 12 in × 6 in 30 cm × 15 cm
- Material: Aluminum
- Serial format: ABC1234
- Introduced: July 1998

Availability
- Issued by: Washington State Department of Licensing

History
- First issued: June 10, 1915 (pre-state plates from May 1905 through May 31, 1915)

The U.S. state of Washington first required its residents to register their motor vehicles in 1905. Registrants provided their own license plates for display until 1915, when the state began to issue plates.

As of 2026, plates are issued by the Washington State Department of Licensing. Front and rear plates are required for most classes of vehicles, while only rear plates are required for motorcycles and trailers.

The plates have been manufactured by incarcerated workers managed by the Washington State Department of Corrections since 1923. They are primarily produced at the Washington State Penitentiary in Walla Walla, with some also made at the Monroe Correctional Complex in Monroe.

== Passenger baseplates ==
=== 1915 to 1949 ===
Image	Dates issued	Design	Slogan	Serial format	Serials issued	Notes
	1915–16	Embossed white serial on dark blue plate with border line; vertical "WN" and "1916" at left and right respectively	none	12345	1 to approximately 45000, with gaps (see right)	Single series of all-numeric serials used for all classes of vehicles, including trucks, vehicles for hire and dealer vehicles.
	1916–17	Embossed white serial on lavender plate with border line; "WN" at left and vertical "X17" at right	none	12345	1 to approximately 64000, with gaps	The 'X' indicated the passenger class of vehicles; other letters were used for other classes.
	1917–18	Embossed white serial on black plate with border line; "WN" at left and vertical "X18" at right	none	12345	1 to approximately 96000, with gaps	
	1918–19	Embossed black serial on yellow plate with border line; "WN X-19" at left	none	123456	1 to approximately 114000	Revalidated through February 29, 1920, with white porcelain tabs.
	1919–20	Black serial on yellow and white porcelain plate; "WN X-20" on white section at left	none	123456	144001 to approximately 157000, with gaps	Both these plates issued only to new registrants.
	1919–20	As above, but fully embossed with border line	none	123456	157501 to approximately 194000, with gaps	Both these plates issued only to new registrants.
	1920–21	Embossed white serial on green plate; "WN X-21" at left	none	123456	1 to approximately 181000, with gaps	
	1921	Embossed black serial on gray plate; "WN X:21" at left	none	123456	1 to approximately 184000, with gaps	
	1922	Embossed white serial on brown plate; "WN X-22" at left	none	123456	1 to approximately 195000, with gaps	
	1923	Embossed dark blue serial on white plate; "WN X:23" at left	none	123456	1 to 200000; 300001 to approximately 319000	
	1924	Embossed white serial on dark blue plate; "WN X:24" at left	none	123456	1 to approximately 253000	
	1925	Embossed dark blue serial on white plate; "WN X-25" at left	none	123456	1 to approximately 282000	
	1926	Embossed white serial on green plate; "WASHINGTON" at bottom, slightly offset to right; vertical "X26" at left	none	123-456	1 to approximately 311-000	First use of the full state name.
	1927	Embossed green serial on white plate; "WASHINGTON" at bottom, slightly offset to right; vertical "X27" at left	none	123-456	1 to approximately 326-000	
	1928	Embossed black serial on orange plate with border line; "X WASHINGTON-28" at bottom	none	123-456	1 to approximately 343-000	
	1929	Embossed white serial on green plate with border line; "X WASHINGTON-29" at bottom	none	123-456	1 to approximately 394-000	
	1930	Embossed green serial on white plate with border line; "30 WASHINGTON X" at bottom	none	123-456	1 to approximately 380-000	
	1931	Embossed white serial on green plate with border line; "X WASHINGTON 31" at bottom	none	123-456	1 to approximately 348-000	
	1932	Embossed green serial on white plate with border line; "X 32 WASHINGTON" at bottom	none	123-456	1 to approximately 381-000	
	1933	Embossed white serial on green plate with border line; "X WASHINGTON 33" at top	none	123-456	1 to approximately 359-000	
	1934	Embossed green serial on white plate with border line; "X WASHINGTON 34" at bottom	none	123-456	1 to approximately 358-000	
	1935	Embossed white serial on dark blue plate with border line; "X WASHINGTON 35" at bottom	none	A-12345; 123-456; AB-1234	County-coded (A or AB)	First use of county codes, and last use of 'X' to indicate the passenger class. Six-digit all-numeric serials issued in King County following A-99999; this happened again in 1936.
	1936	Embossed dark blue serial on white plate with border line; "19 WASHINGTON 36" at bottom	none	A-12345; 123-456; AB-1234	County-coded (A or AB)	
	1937	Embossed white serial on dark blue plate with border line; "WASHINGTON 1937" at top	none	A-123-456; AB-1234	County-coded (A or AB)	
	1938	Embossed green serial on white plate with border line; "1938 WASHINGTON" at top	none	A-123-456; AB-1234	County-coded (A or AB)	
	1939	Embossed golden yellow serial on green plate with border line; "STATE OF WASHINGTON" at bottom	"1889-GOLDEN JUBILEE-1939" at top	A-123-456; AB-1234	County-coded (A or AB)	Commemorated Washington's 50 years of statehood.
	1940	Embossed green serial on white plate with border line; "WASHINGTON 1940" at bottom	none	A-123-456; AB-1234	County-coded (A or AB)	
	1941	Embossed white serial on green plate with border line; "WASHINGTON 1941" at top	none	A-123-456; AB-1234	County-coded (A or AB)	
	1942–44	Embossed green serial on white plate; "WASHINGTON 1942" at bottom	none	A-123-456; AB-1234	County-coded (A or AB)	Revalidated for 1943 and 1944 with windshield stickers, due to metal conservation for World War II.
	1944	As 1942 base, but with "WASHINGTON 1944" at bottom	none	12345	1 to approximately 89000	Issued only to new registrants.
	1945–46	Embossed green serial on white plate; "WASHINGTON 1945" at top	none	A-123-456; AB-1234	County-coded (A or AB)	Revalidated for 1946 with windshield stickers.
	1947–48	Embossed green serial on unpainted aluminum plate; "WASHINGTON 1947" at bottom	none	A·123·456; AB·1234	County-coded (A or AB)	Revalidated for 1948 with windshield stickers.
	1949	Embossed green serial on unpainted aluminum plate; "WASHINGTON 1949" at top	none	A123·456; AB·1234	County-coded (A or AB)	

=== 1950 to present ===
In 1956, the United States, Canada, and Mexico came to an agreement with the American Association of Motor Vehicle Administrators, the Automobile Manufacturers Association and the National Safety Council that standardized the size for license plates for vehicles (except those for motorcycles) at 6 inches (15 cm) in height by 12 inches (30 cm) in width, with standardized mounting holes. The first Washington license plate that complied with these standards was a modification of the 1954 plate, introduced in January 1956.

Image	Dates issued	Design	Slogan	Serial format	Serials issued	Notes
	1950	Embossed green serial on white plate; "WASHINGTON 50" at bottom	none	A123·456; AB·1234	County-coded (A or AB)	Revalidated for 1951 with silver tabs, for 1952 with windshield stickers, and for 1953 with green tabs.
	1951–53	As above, but with "51" instead of "50"	none	A123·456; AB·1234	County-coded (A or AB)	Single plate issued only to new registrants. Revalidated for 1952 and 1953 in the same manner as for 1950 plates.
	1954–57	Embossed white serial on green plate; "54 WASHINGTON" at bottom	none	123-456 A 12-345 AB	County-coded (A or AB)	Revalidated for 1955 with silver tabs, for 1956 with white tabs, and for 1957 with green tabs.
	1956–57	As above, but to 6" x 12" size, and with narrower serial dies and border line	none	123-456 A 12-345 AB	County-coded (A or AB)	Validated for 1956 and 1957 in the same manner as for 1954–55 plates.
	1958–62	Embossed white serial on green plate with border line; "WASHINGTON" centered at bottom	none	ABC 123	County-coded	Validated each year with plate stickers.
	1963–64	Embossed green serial on non-reflective white plate with border line; "WASH. 63" centered at bottom	none	ABC 123	County-coded (until 1981)	
	1965–67	As above, but with "WASHINGTON" centered at bottom	none	ABC 123	County-coded (until 1981)	
	1968–82	As above, but reflective, and with "WASHINGTON" at top, offset to left	none	ABC 123	County-coded (until 1981)	
	1982–85	As above, but with "WASHINGTON" screened rather than embossed	none	ABC 123	Unused 'E', 'G', 'H' and 'L' series	
	1985–86	As above, but with narrower serial dies	none	ABC-123	Unused 'L' and 'W' series	
	1987 – late 1990	Embossed dark blue serial on reflective white plate with light blue Mount Rainier graphic and dark blue border line; "Washington" screened in red centered at top	"Centennial Celebration" screened in red centered at bottom	123-ABC	000-AAA to 999-DGP	I, O and Q not used as the first letter in this serial format. Seven-year plate replacement schedule phased from January 2001 to December 2014.
	late 1990 – July; 1998	Embossed dark blue serial on reflective white plate with light blue Mount Rainier graphic and dark blue border line; "Washington" screened in red centered at top	none	123-ABC	000-DGQ to 999-JNZ	I, O and Q not used as the first letter in this serial format. Seven-year plate replacement schedule phased from January 2001 to December 2014.
	July; 1998 – December 31, 2009	As above, but without dark blue border line, and with "WASHINGTON" screened in red at top, offset to left	"EVERGREEN STATE" screened in red centered at bottom	123-ABC	000-JOA to 999-ZZZ	I, O and Q not used as the first letter in this serial format. Seven-year plate replacement schedule phased from January 2001 to December 2014.
	January 1, 2010 – October 2024	As above, but without dark blue border line, and with "WASHINGTON" screened in red at top, offset to left	"EVERGREEN STATE" screened in red centered at bottom	ABC1234	AAA0000 to CPE8599; CPL1600 to CPN2599; CRH0000 to CTM9999	I, O and Q not used as the third letter in this serial format. Seven-year plate replacement schedule discontinued in January 2015.
	October 2024 – present	As above, but Un-embossed with navy blue letters.	"EVERGREEN STATE" screened in red centered at bottom	ABC1234	CPE8600 to CPL1599; CPN2600 to CRG9999; CTN0000 to CXT9999 (as of June 21, 2026)	I, O and Q not used in the 'C' series of serials.

== Non-passenger plates ==
Image	Type	Dates issued	Design	Serial format	Serials issued	Notes
	Disabled	1990-98	Similar to 1990-98 passenger plates, but with man in wheelchair on right	12345D/P	D/P12345-D/P99999	
	Disabled	1999-2010	Similar to 1998-2010 passenger plates, but with man in wheelchair on right	12345D/P	D/P00001-D/P99999	
	Disabled	2010–present	Similar to 2010–present passenger plates, but with man in wheelchair on left; plate also became screened	D/P12345	D/P00001-present	
	Motorcycle	1968–76	Debossed white on green with border line; "WASHINGTON" at top, offset to left	AB-123	AA-000 to approximately KY-999	Validated until 2000.
	Motorcycle	1976–86	Embossed green on white with border line; "WASHINGTON" at top, offset to left	123456	000001 to approximately 297000	Validated until 2000.
	Motorcycle	1987–99	Similar to 1987–98 passenger plates, but with "Washington" offset to left and no slogan	123456	400000 to approximately 601999	
	Motorcycle	1999–2008	Similar to current passenger plates, but without slogan	123456	602000 to 999999	
	Motorcycle	2008–present	Similar to current passenger plates, but without slogan	1A2345	0A0000 to present	
	Trailer – large	1987–90	As 1987–90 passenger plates	1234-AB	0000-JA to approximately 9999-KC	
	Trailer – large	1990–99	As 1990–98 passenger plates	1234-AB	0000-KD to approximately 9999-MH	
	Trailer – large	1999–2016	As current passenger plates	1234-AB	0000-MI to 9999-ZZ	
	Trailer – large	2016–present	As current passenger plates	12345AB	00000AA to present	
	Truck	1987–90	As 1987–90 passenger plates	12345-A	00000-H to 11999-T	
	Truck	1990–95	As 1990–98 passenger plates	12345-A	12000-T to 99999-Z	
	Truck	1995–99	As 1990–98 passenger plates	A12345B	A00000A to A18999E	
	Truck	1999–present	As current passenger plates	A12345B	A19000E to present	
	Apportioned Combination	1988–94	As 1987–90 style passenger plates with "Apportioned" in red text at bottom	12345AB		
	Apportioned Combination	1994–99	As 1990–98 style passenger plates with text "APPOR. COMBINATION" in red on yellow sticker at bottom	12345AB		
	Apportioned Combination	1998–99	As above except black band around edge has been omitted	12345AB		
	Apportioned Combination	2000–present	As 1998–present style passenger plates with text "APPOR. COMBINATION" in red on yellow sticker at bottom or with text "APPORTIONED COMBINATION" in red printed at bottom	12345AB		
	Rental Car	1990–1998	As 1990–1998 passenger plates. Discontinued after used to target and rob tourists. First three digits sometimes reflect rental car company (ex. NCR= National Car Rental.)	AAA0000		

== County coding ==
County	One- or two-letter code, 1935–57	Three-letter codes, 1958–81
King	A	AAA–AZZ, OAA–OZZ, IAA–IRZ, IUA–IZZ, UCA–UKZ
Pierce	B	BAA–BZZ, TBA–TFZ
Spokane	C	CAA–CKZ, CNA–CTZ, CVA–CVK (1963–81), CVL–CZZ, SLA–SMZ
Snohomish	D	DAA–DRZ, DVA–DVR
Yakima	E	EAA–EKZ
Whatcom	F	FAA–FFM
Clark	G	GAA–GCZ, GEA–GNP
Grays Harbor	H	HAA–HDW
Kitsap	I	KSA–KUB, KVA–KZF
Thurston	J	JAA–JEK
Chelan	K	KAA–KDH
Lewis	L	LAA–LDG
Skagit	M	MAA–MDS
Cowlitz	N	NAA–NFP
Walla Walla	O	WWA–WYZ
Whitman	P	PAA–PCF
Clallam	Q	CLA–CMZ, PDA–PDF
Benton	R	RAA–REU
Kittitas	S	SAA–SBM
Lincoln	T	TAA–TAN
Okanogan	U	UAA–UBK
Pacific	V	VAA–VAW
Stevens	W	WAA–WBD
Mason	X	XAA–XAZ
Jefferson	Y	YAA–YAN
Klickitat	Z	ZAA–ZBD
Adams	AD	YYA–YYR
Asotin	AN	ZZA–ZZZ, ZYA–ZYL
Columbia	CO	CUA–CUG
Douglas	DO	DSA–DST
Franklin	FN	FNA–FSF
Ferry	FY	FYA–FYE
Garfield	GA	GDA–GDF
Grant	GT	GTA–GVW
Island	IS	CVA–CVK (1958–62); ISA–ITZ (1963–81)
Pend Oreille	PO	PEB–PES
Skamania	SA	SKA–SKK
San Juan	SJ	SJA–SJK
Wahkiakum	WA	WMA–WMF

== Specialty plates ==
Image	Type	Dates issued	Design	Slogan	Serial format	Serials issued	Notes
	4-H		Black serial on gradient white and green plate; 4-H four-leaf clover emblem at left; "WASHINGTON" in black at top left	"4-H For YOUth!" in black at bottom	4/H 12345	4/H 00001 to present	
	Amateur Radio		As standard passenger base, but with black serial	"EVERGREEN STATE" in red at bottom	FCC call sign		
	Collector Vehicle		As standard passenger base, but with black serial	"EVERGREEN STATE" in red at bottom; "COLLECTOR VEHICLE" vertically at left	12345 1234A	00001 to 99999 0001A to current	Issued to vehicles 30 years old or older. Need not display month/year tabs.
	Endangered Wildlife		Black serial on graphic plate with ocean and cliffs against a light blue sky and breaching killer whale at left; "WASHINGTON" in black at top left	"Endangered Wildlife" in dark blue at bottom	E/W 12345	E/W 00001 to present	Vanity variants also issued.
	Fly Washington Aviation		Black serial on graphic plate with Mount Rainier in background with a yellow and teal biplane left of serial; "Fly WASHINGTON" in blue at top left	"CELEBRATE AVIATION" in white at bottom	A/V 12345	A/V 00001 to present	
	Keep Kids Safe	January 3, 2006 – present	Black serial on pale blue plate with green, pink, blue, yellow and red handprints; "WASHINGTON" in black at top left	"Keep Kids Safe" in green at bottom	K/S 12345	K/S 00001 to present	
	Music Matters		Black serial on graphic plate with music notes and lines against a yellow and orange background; "WASHINGTON" in black at top left	"Music Matters" in Red at bottom	MU12345	MU00001 to present	
	Preserve Our National Parks		Black serial on graphic plate with North Cascades in mist against a pink and gray sky; "WASHINGTON" in black at top left	"Preserve Our National Parks" in black at bottom	N/P 12345	N/P 00001 to present	Vanity variants also issued.
	San Juan Islands		White serial on graphic plate with Pacific madrone tree and pod of orcas surfacing; "WASHINGTON" in white at top left	"San Juan Islands" in white at bottom	S/J 12345	S/J 00001 to present	
	Share the Road		Black serial on graphic plate with Mount Rainier at top, green field in middle, gray road at bottom and cyclist at left; "WASHINGTON" in black at top left	"SHARE THE ROAD" in yellow at bottom	B/K 12345	B/K 00001 to present	
	United States Army		Black serial on graphic plate with national flag in background and emblem of the Department of the Army at left; "WASHINGTON" in black at top left	none	A/R 12345	A/R 00001 to present	
	United States Navy		Black serial on graphic plate with national flag in background and emblem of the U.S. Navy at left; "WASHINGTON" in black at top left	none	N/A 12345	N/A 00001 to present	
	University of Washington	2006 – December 2013	Black serial on white and gold gradient plate; purple 'W' logo at left and university's seal at right; "WASHINGTON" in black at top left	"UNIVERSITY OF WASHINGTON" in purple at bottom	1234A	0001A to approximately 8700A	
	University of Washington	December 2013 – present	White serial on purple plate; gold 'W' logo at left; "WASHINGTON" in white at top left	"UNIVERSITY of WASHINGTON" in gold at bottom	1234A	8701A to present	
	Washington State University	1987 -January 2012	Red serial on Washington plate; red “Cougar” WSU logo at left; vertical WSU lettering at left; “WASHINGTON” in red at top left	"GO COUGARS" in red at bottom		Unknown	
	Washington State University	January 2012 – present	White serial on crimson red plate; white "Cougar" WSU logo at right; vertical WSU lettering in center; "WASHINGTON" in white at top left	"WASHINGTON STATE UNIVERSITY" in white at bottom	W/S/U123A	001A to present	
	Washington Apple Commission	July 1, 2020 – present	White serial on navy blue plate with state outline at right and Washington Apple Commission logo in red at left; "WASHINGTON" in white at top left	"World's Finest Apples" in white at bottom	W/A/C 1234	W/A/C 0001 to present	
	Wildlife - deer		Black serial on graphic plate with forest scene in background and deer at left; "WASHINGTON" in black at top left	"Washingtons's Wildlife" in green at bottom	W/D 12345	W/D 00001 to present	
	Wildlife – bald eagle		Black serial on graphic plate with sunset scene in background and bald eagle at left; "WASHINGTON" in black at top left	"Wild on Washington" in yellow at bottom	W/W 12345	W/W 00001 to present	
