= Jessyn Farrell =

American politician

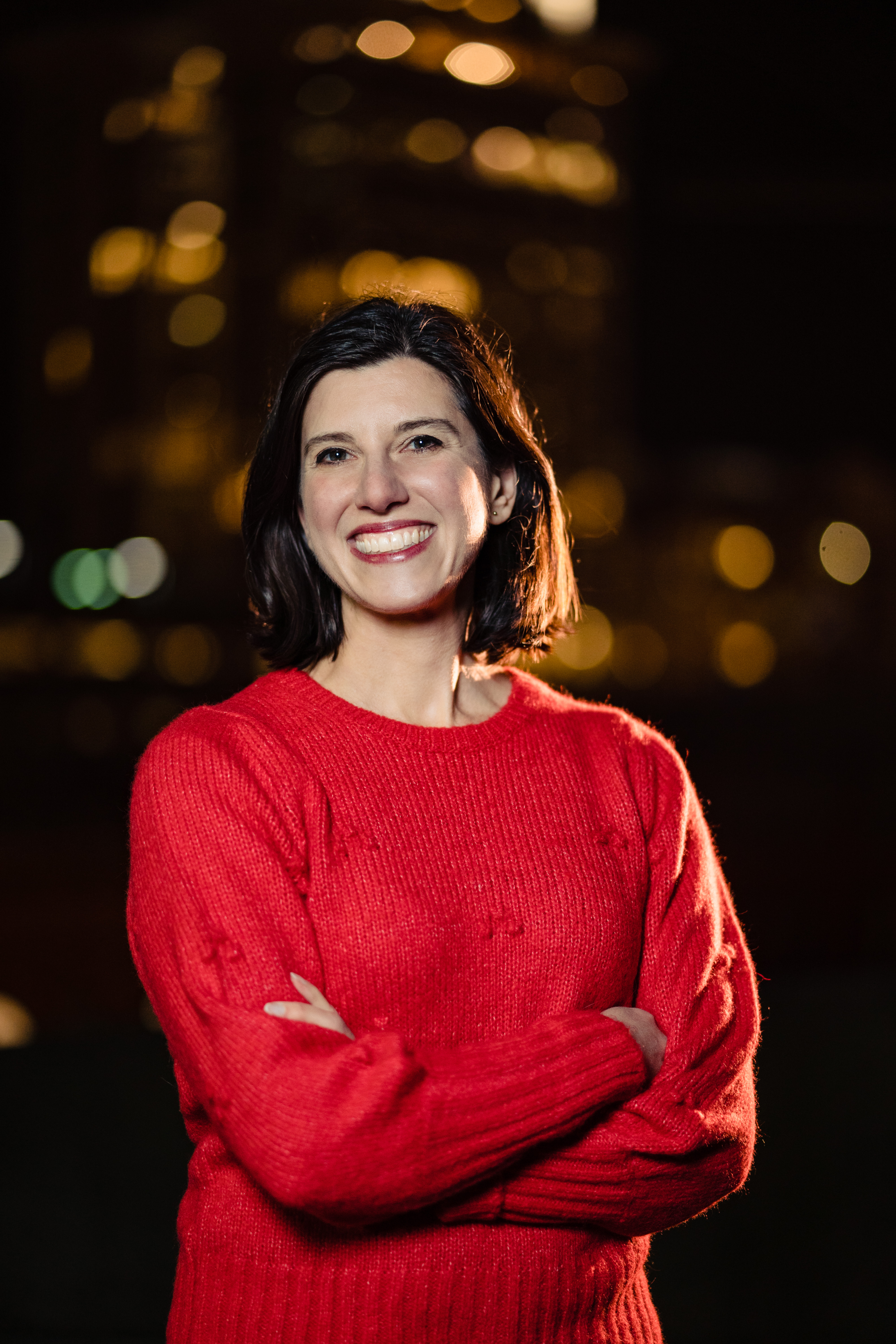

Member of the Washington House of Representatives from the 46th district
- In office January 14, 2013 – June 1, 2017
- Preceded by: Phyllis Gutiérrez Kenney
- Succeeded by: Javier Valdez

Personal details
- Born: Jessyn Lynn Staulcup; November 8, 1973 (age 52) Seattle, Washington, U.S.
- Party: Democratic
- Education: University of Washington (BA); Boston College (JD)

Jessyn Lynn Farrell (née Staulcup, born November 8, 1973) is an American activist and politician who served as a member of the Washington House of Representatives from 2013 to 2017. In the legislature, she focused on transportation, education, and labor issues. Farrell began her 2017 Seattle mayoral election campaign on May 12, 2017, and did not advance in the August 1, 2017 primary.

== Early life and education ==
Jessyn Farrell grew up in Seattle's Lake City neighborhood, and the adjacent city of Lake Forest Park.

At Shorecrest High School, Farrell was voted "most likely to be a politician." After graduating with a degree in history from the University of Washington, where she was the leader of the saxophone section in the Husky Marching Band, Farrell served as an AmeriCorps volunteer with the Youth Tutoring Program at Yesler Terrace.

Farrell earned a Juris Doctor from Boston College Law School. As a summer intern, she worked for the International Criminal Tribunal for the Former Yugoslavia, assisting in the investigation and prosecution of war crimes.

== Career ==
=== Activism ===
Farrell is a longtime transit and environmental advocate. She started out as Transportation Advocate at the Washington Public Interest Research Group in Seattle, where she directed their efforts to reduce the health and environmental impacts of automobile emissions.

From 2005 to 2008, Farrell served as the executive director of Transportation Choices Coalition (TCC), the leading nonprofit advocate for public transit in Washington. Under her leadership, the group led a coalition of transit and environmental organizations that successfully lobbied to redefine the state view of transportation capacity in a way that allowed more public funding to shift toward light rail and away from highways. Farrell and TCC also supported the passage of the 2008 ballot measure for Sound Transit 2, which funded light rail expansion north to Lynnwood, south to Federal Way, and east across Lake Washington.

After her time at TCC, Farrell joined the executive team at Pierce Transit, where she helped oversee the response to the Great Recession. Pierce Transit subsequently won the 2012 Puget Sound Regional Council VISION 2040 Award.

=== Washington House of Representatives ===
In 2012, Farrell ran for Position 2 in the 46th Legislative District of the Washington State House of Representatives. She defeated five opponents in the primary election and won the general election with 64% of the vote. She was reelected in 2014, with 82% of the vote, and in 2016, when she ran unopposed.

Farrell served on the Transportation (Vice Chair), Rules, and Commerce and Gaming committees in the State House. She was also the chair of the Working Families Caucus.

==== Labor ====
In the State House, Farrell was part of the Democratic effort to raise the statewide minimum wage. She introduced minimum wage bills in 2014, 2015, and 2016, securing passage through the House in 2015, only for the bill to die in the Republican-controlled Senate. The Democratic campaign to raise the minimum wage across Washington culminated in the passage of Initiative 1433 at the ballot box in November 2016, which will gradually raise the minimum wage to $13.50 by 2020.

In 2017, Farrell sponsored the Pregnant Workers' Fairness Act, which provides protections for pregnant women in Washington workplaces, such as more frequent restroom breaks, accessible drinking water, and flexible scheduling for doctors' visits. This was signed into law by Governor Jay Inslee on May 16, 2017. Farrell was also a strong proponent of the 2015 Equal Pay Opportunity Act, which passed the House, but not the Republican-controlled Senate.

==== Transit ====
Farrell is known for her work on improving transit, and campaigning to successfully pass Sound Transit 3 (ST3), though she also voted along with State House Democrats to remove some funding from ST3.

In 2015, Farrell sponsored a bill that improves coordination between transit agencies in the Puget Sound region in order to provide better service, improve efficiency, save money, and institute accountability measures.

As Vice Chair of the Transportation Committee, Farrell was one of the legislative leaders involved in negotiating the 2015 Connect Washington transportation package. This spending bill funds hundreds of projects across Washington over a 16-year period, including overhauling State Route 520 and improving I-405, while also authorizing the Sound Transit 3 ballot measure for expansions to light rail, bus, and commuter rail in the Puget Sound region. The $16.1 billion package was funded by an 11.9-cent per gallon gasoline tax increase and by authorizing state bonds. The bill included money for pedestrian and bike infrastructure, such as the Northgate Pedestrian Bridge and the Burke-Gilman Trail.

The transportation package also supported affordable housing and education in the Puget Sound region. It required Sound Transit to contribute $20 million over five years to affordable housing and to give affordable housing developers the opportunity to bid on at least 80% of its surplus property. In addition, when Republicans earmarked $518 million in sales taxes from Sound Transit to go into the general fund, Farrell forced through an amendment that will require that money to be spent on educational programs for vulnerable students in the Sound Transit region.

In 2017, in response to a controversy over the valuation schedule used by Sound Transit to determine the amount of Motor Vehicle Excise Tax (MVET), the House Democratic caucus voted to direct Sound Transit to use a newer valuation schedule that more accurately reflects cars' resale value and decreases taxes on many car owners in the Sound Transit area. Farrell supported this change, writing: "there's no way I'm asking my constituents to pay an MVET that's undergirded by an out of whack valuation schedule. When something is wrong, you fix it. Even if means taking some heat."

==== Transportation safety ====
Transportation safety was a particular area of focus for Farrell. In 2015, she led the passage of the Oil Transportation Safety Act, which gives advance notice of oil shipments to first responders and requires greater public disclosure of oil transportation. In 2017, she was the lead sponsor of the Driving Under the Influence of Electronics Act, a bipartisan bill that prohibits dangerous behaviors such as texting or holding an electronic device while driving.

=== Seattle mayoral election 2017 ===
Farrell announced her entry into the race for Seattle mayor on May 12, 2017, one of several officeholders who joined the race shortly after Mayor Ed Murray announced he would not seek reelection. In a crowded field of 21 candidates ahead of the August 1 primary, Farrell was considered to be one of a half dozen relatively recognizable and viable candidates in the race, along with Jenny Durkan, Cary Moon, Nikkita Oliver, State Senator Bob Hasegawa, and former Mayor Mike McGinn.

=== Seattle mayoral election 2021 ===
On March 18, 2021, Farrell announced that she was again running for mayor to replace incumbent mayor Jenny Durkan, who did not run for re-election. She said that her main priorities as mayor would be to expand public transportation and making housing and childcare more affordable. She came in fourth place in the nonpartisan primary with 7% of the vote, and did not advance to the general election.

=== City of Seattle ===
On February 1, 2022, City of Seattle Mayor Bruce Harrell announced his appointment of Farrell as Director of the city's Office of Environment and Sustainability. In 2025 she was appointed as a deputy mayor.
