= 2017 Seattle mayoral election =

- November 7, 2017
- Turnout: 49.21%
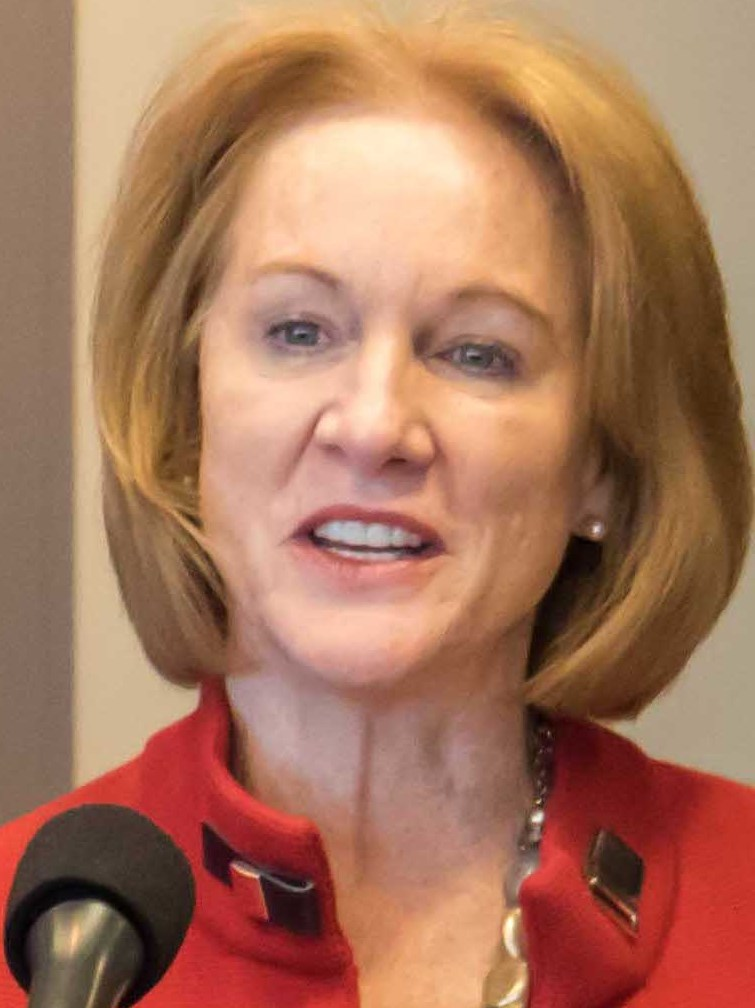

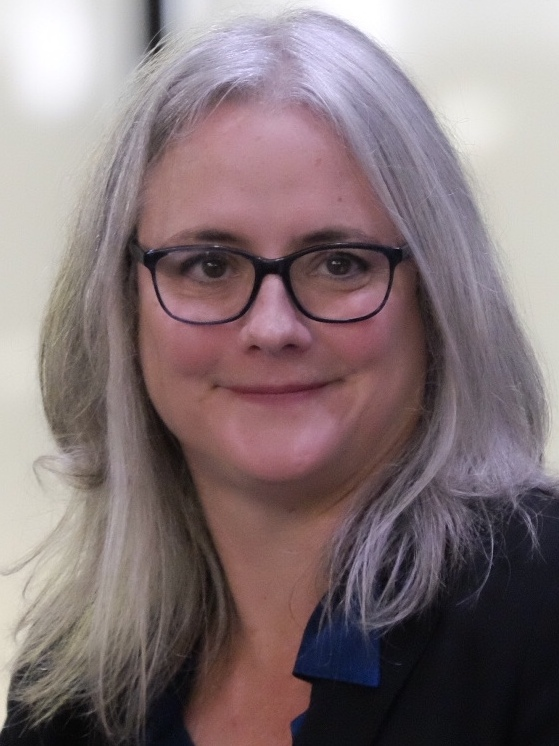
Candidate	Jenny Durkan	Cary Moon
Popular vote	122,442	95,251
Percentage	56.25%	43.75%
- Durkan: 50–60% 60–70% Moon: 50–60% Durkan: 40–50% 50–60% 60–70% 70–80% 80–90% >90% Moon: 40–50% 50–60% 60–70% 70–80% 80–90%
Mayor before election
Tim Burgess
Democratic
Elected mayor
Jenny Durkan
Democratic

The 2017 Seattle mayoral election was held on November 7, 2017. It was won by former U.S. Attorney Jenny Durkan, who defeated Cary Moon in the general election by 15 percentage points. The two candidates had advanced from an earlier primary election held in August, which ensured that Seattle would have its first female mayor since Bertha Knight Landes was elected in 1926.

Incumbent Mayor Ed Murray initially sought re-election, but ended his campaign amid allegations of sexual abuse which led to his resignation in September 2017. In the top-two primary, leading candidates had included Durkan, Moon, Nikkita Oliver, former State Representative Jessyn Farrell, former Mayor Mike McGinn, and State Senator Bob Hasegawa. Fifteen lesser-known candidates were also on the primary ballot.

Durkan had a large lead over Moon after the preliminary general election ballot count on November 7, and Moon conceded the next day. Durkan officially took office on November 28, after the results were certified, replacing interim Mayor Tim Burgess.

== Voting ==
Elections in Washington use a nonpartisan blanket primary which selects the top two candidates, whether endorsed by any party or not, to appear on the general election ballot, along with a write-in space. Washington elections have been vote-by-mail in every county since 1990. Since there are no polling places, voting can only be done by absentee ballot, typically mailed to registered voters 20 days ahead of the election deadline, and returned by US Mail. Replacement ballots may be downloaded online and printed by the voter. Designated ballot drop boxes are available as an alternative to mailing, and voters with disabilities can get assistance in person beginning 18 days before election day. Mail in ballots must be postmarked by midnight of the election day, or delivered to the drop box by 8 pm.

The ballots for the 2017 primary were mailed on July 12, and the primary election day was August 1. King County Elections began posting results at 8:30 pm on that day, and certified final results on August 15. General election ballots were mailed out on or before October 18, and drop boxes opened the following day. The general Election Day was November 7, and results were certified on November 28.

== City politics ==
Ed Murray, a former state legislator, was elected Mayor of Seattle during the 2013 mayoral election, defeating incumbent Mike McGinn. During Murray's first term in office, Seattle adopted a $15 hourly minimum wage, a citywide preschool program, a large transportation funding measure, and reforms within the Seattle Police Department after intervention from the United States Department of Justice.

=== Ed Murray abuse lawsuit ===
In early April, several months before the primary election, a lawsuit was filed against Mayor Ed Murray, alleging sexual abuse of the plaintiff as a minor in the 1980s in exchange for drug money. The allegations were denied by Murray, who initially said he would fight the suit and carry on his campaign, but decided to withdraw a month later because, he said, the Mayor's race should be about the needs of the city, not "a scandal, which it would be focused on, if I were to remain in". The Seattle Times editorial board had said they feared dealing with the allegations during an election would weaken Murray to the point that an "extreme left-wing ideologue" could become Mayor, so Murray should withdraw from the race to "clear the way for another qualified, pragmatic leader to come forward". The Stranger alt-weekly said that even though The Times mentioned Kshama Sawant as the kind of mayor they feared, they really meant lawyer and Black Lives Matter activist Nikkita Oliver. Murray ended his campaign on May 9, after a fourth accuser was identified.

== Primary election ==
=== Candidates ===
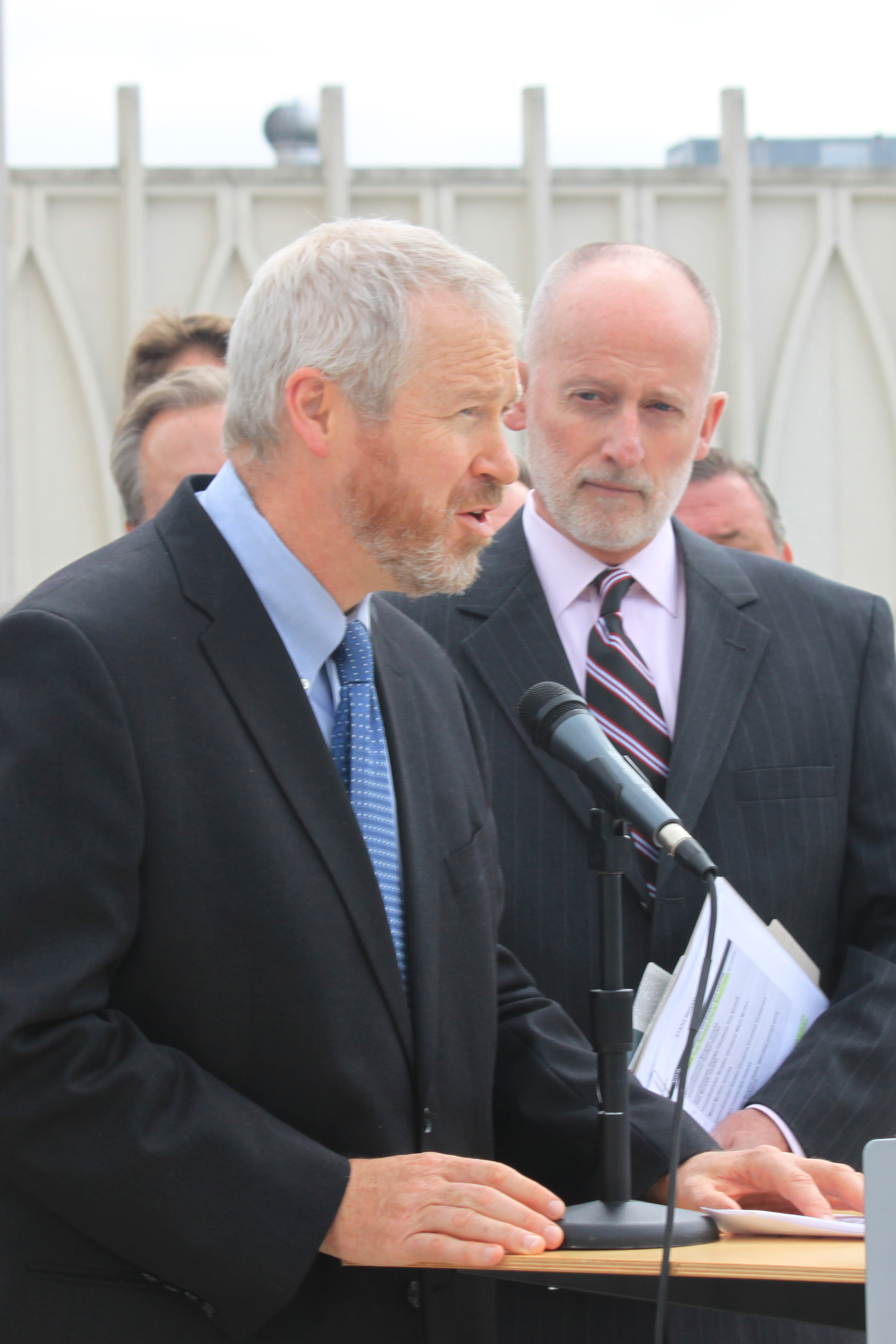
Mike McGinn, left, with Tim Burgess, right

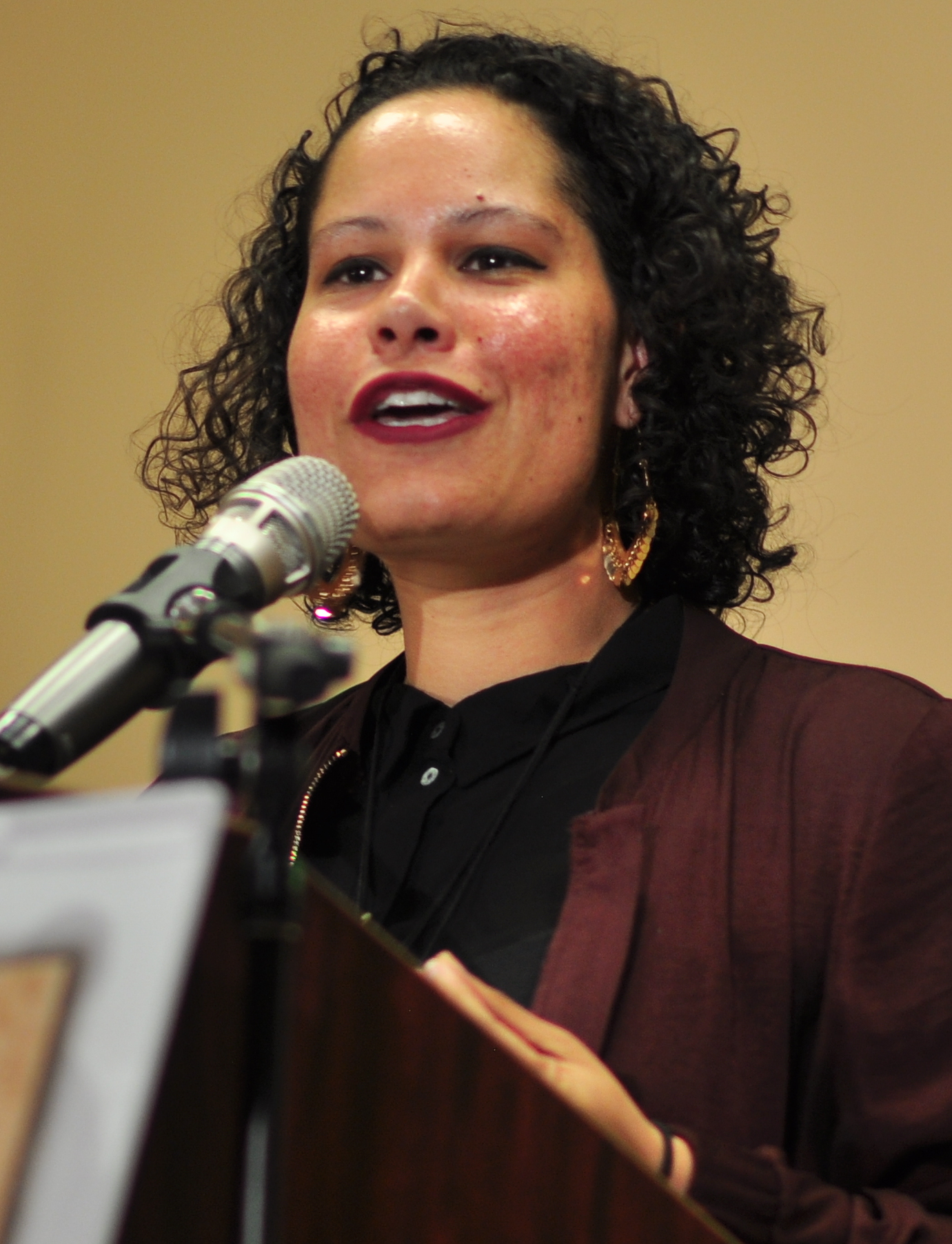
Nikkita Oliver

On final ballot
Seattle elections are officially nonpartisan, but some candidates have a stated party affiliation.

- Gary Brose (Republican), entrepreneur
- Casey Carlisle (Libertarian)
- Tiniell Cato (Democratic), grant writer, business owner, philanthropist
- Jenny Durkan (Democratic), former U.S. Attorney for Western Washington
- Jessyn Farrell (Democratic), state representative from 46th district
- Thom Gunn (Green Democrat)
- Greg Hamilton (Independent), business owner
- Michael Harris (Democratic), TV producer and conservationist
- Bob Hasegawa (Democratic), state senator from 11th district.
- Lewis A. Jones (Republican), small business owner
- David Kane (no party)
- Harley Lever (Independent, leans Democratic), research scientist, leader of "Safe Seattle" advocacy group
- Mary Juanita Martin (Socialist Workers Party), factory worker
- Mike McGinn (Democratic), former mayor
- Cary Moon (Democratic), activist and urban planner
- James W. Norton Jr. (Democratic), Seattle police officer
- Larry Oberto (no party), former race driver, motorsports management
- Nikkita Oliver (People's Party), attorney, educator, organizer (including Black Lives Matter), and public figure
- Jason Roberts (Democratic), consultant
- Alex Tsimerman (Independent), retired
- Keith Whiteman (no party), musician

Withdrawn

- Peter Alcorn
- Prachant Bradwell
- David Ishii
- Ed Murray, incumbent mayor; withdrew May 9
- Andres Salomon, safe streets activist; withdrew April 20
- Adam Star, attorney; withdrew April 28

Declined

- Lorena González, city councilmember
- Mike O'Brien, city councilmember

==== Political positions ====
Each candidate on the primary ballot was sent a questionnaire by The Seattle Times in which they discussed their political positions.

- Gary Brose — More traffic lanes for cars, remove homeless from public areas, fiscal discipline.
- Casey Carlisle — Address cost of living, traffic, and homelessness by deregulating developers, stronger property rights.
- Tiniell Cato — Remove race, creed, sexuality, income, etc., from government documents, applications and processes to eliminate inequality.
- Jenny Durkan — Emphasis on experience in delivering progressive results, success in police reform. Flexible solutions to housing affordability, homelessness.
- Jessyn Farrell — Legislative experience, progressive results in transportation, public school, helping workers. Addressing inequality, housing affordability.
- Thom Gunn — Limit growth, oppose Californication of Seattle.
- Greg Hamilton — Did not reply to ST's questionnaire, but has spoken out on property crime, homelessness and traffic. Work with developers.
- Michael Harris — No new taxes, more bipartisanship and efficient government.
- Bob Hasegawa — Reclaim power for people from the wealthy. Long history in public office. Address inequality. Establish municipal bank to help build more housing. Manage city's rapid growth.
- Lewis A. Jones — Address cell phone cancer, pro-Russia, wind breaks to reduce greenhouse gas emissions, punish adultery to stop HIV
- Dave Kane — Did not reply to ST's questionnaire, has made no public statements
- Harley Lever — Use data and research to address homelessness, opioid addiction, education, health care.
- Mary Juanita Martin — Remedy housing, job, and crime issues by overturning capitalism, ending the rule of property owners
- Mike McGinn — Help lower and middle class without more regressive sales and property taxes. No new taxes until city budget fully reviewed. Effective management of details of government, not starting big projects
- Cary Moon — Experience as engineer, finding solutions for large urban systems, community activism. Non-car-centric transportation. Deep knowledge of city's issues.
- James W. Norton Jr. — Individualized solutions to homelessness. Government not listening to ordinary people.
- Larry Oberto — Fiscal accountability, address homelessness by requiring civility, make traffic flow better.
- Nikkita Oliver — Systemic change to address homelessness/displacement, better representation for marginalized communities/neighborhoods/small business, police reform, transit, wiser use of city resources.
- Jason Roberts — Budget reform, accountability.
- Alex Tsimerman — Did not reply to ST's questionnaire, but has spoken out saying Seattle is fascist, one-party rule, controlled by Jeff Bezos and Amazon. Support Donald Trump.
- Keith Whiteman — Bail reform or pretrial detention reform, influence public debate without necessarily winning.

=== Endorsements ===
Jenny Durkan

Officeholders

- Sally Bagshaw, Seattle City Council member (District 7)
- Tim Burgess, Seattle City Council member (Position 8)
- Debora Juarez, Seattle City Council member (District 5)
- Joe McDermott, King County Council member (District 8)
- Ed Murray, former incumbent mayor

Individuals

- Christine Gregoire, former governor of Washington
- Ron Sims, former Deputy Secretary of Housing and Urban Development and former King County Executive

Media

- The Seattle Times

Organizations

- Metropolitan Democratic Club of Seattle
- Seattle Metropolitan Chamber of Commerce
Jessyn Farrell

Officeholders

- Claudia Balducci, King County Council member (District 6)
- Rod Dembowski, King County Council member (District 1)
- Noel Frame, Washington state representative (District 36)
- Hilary Franz, Washington Public Lands Commissioner
- Cyrus Habib, lieutenant governor of Washington
- Rob Johnson, Seattle City Council member (District 4)
- Ruth Kagi, Washington state representative (District 32)
- Nicole Macri, Washington state representative (District 43)
- Pat McCarthy, Washington State Auditor
- Gerry Pollet, Washington state representative (District 46)
- Cindy Ryu, Washington state representative (District 32)
- Marilyn Strickland, mayor of Tacoma

Media

- The C is for Crank (Erica C. Barnett)
- Seattle Transit Blog

Political groups

- 43rd Legislative District Democrats
- 46th Legislative District Democrats
- King County Young Democrats

Unions

- International Association of Machinists and Aerospace Workers Lodge 751
- International Association of Sheet Metal, Air, Rail and Transportation Workers Local 66
- International Brotherhood of Teamsters Local 117
- Laborers' International Union of North America Local 1239
- M.L. King County Labor Council (AFL–CIO), split endorsement with Bob Hasegawa
- Sheet Metal Workers Local 66
- UNITE HERE Local 8
- United Food and Commercial Workers Local 21
Bob Hasegawa

Officeholders

- Maralyn Chase, state senator
- Steve Conway, State representative
- Mia Gregerson, state representative
- Ryan McIrvin, Renton city councilmember
- Sharon Nelson, state Senator
- Betty Patu, Seattle School Board member
- DeSean Quinn, Tukwila city councilmember
- Sharon Tomiko Santos, State representative
- Brian Sullivan, Snohomish County councilmember
- John Urquhart, King County sheriff

Individuals

- Phyllis Gutierrez Kenney, former state representative
- Velma Veloria, former state representative

Organizations

- Seattle Education Association (NEA), split endorsement with Nikkita Oliver

Political groups

- 11th Legislative District Democrats
- 32nd Legislative District Democrats
- 21st Legislative District Democrats
- 37th Legislative District Democrats
- 46th Legislative District Democrats
- King County Democrats
- Our Revolution Ballard
- Washington State Progressive Caucus

Unions

- American Federation of State, County and Municipal Employees Local 304
- International Brotherhood of Electrical Workers Local 46
- International Brotherhood of Teamsters Local 174
- International Brotherhood of Teamsters Local 763
- International Longshore and Warehouse Union Local 23
- M.L. King County Labor Council (AFL–CIO), split endorsement with Jessyn Farrell
- Pacific Northwest Regional Council of Carpenters
Mike McGinn

Organizatuons

- Sierra Club
- Sonicsgate
Cary Moon

Media

- The Stranger
- The Urbanist

Organizations

- Seattle Subway
Nikkita Oliver

Officeholders

- Larry Gossett, King County Council member (District 2)
- Mike O'Brien, Seattle City Council member (District 6)
- Kshama Sawant, Seattle City Council member (District 3)

Individuals

- Macklemore
- Velma Veloria, former Washington state representative (District 11)

Organizations

- Seattle Education Association (NEA), split endorsement with Bob Hasegawa

Unions

- United Auto Workers Local 4121

Media

- Seattle Weekly
- The Stranger (dissent from editorial board).

Political groups

- Democratic Socialists of America organization
- Green Party of Washington State, Seattle
- International Socialist Organization
- National Women's Political Caucus of Washington
- Socialist Alternative party

Seattle City Council member Lisa Herbold said on June 6 that she did not intend to endorse anyone, while Bruce Harrell and Lorena González, both supporters of incumbent Ed Murray, had not commented since Murray withdrew. The other six city council members lined up behind either Durkan, Farrell, or Oliver.

=== Opinion polls ===
Poll source	Date(s) administered	Sample size	Margin of error	Mike McGinn	Jenny Durkan	Nikkita Oliver	Bob Hasegawa	Jessyn Farrell	Cary Moon	Gary Brose	Other	Undecided
SurveyUSA	June 6–18, 2017	503	± 4.5%	19%	14%	9%	8%	6%	3%	1%	11%	38%
Washington State Wire	June 15–18, 2017	475	± 4.0%	6%	30%	3%	9%	2%	4%	—	17%	28%

=== Results ===
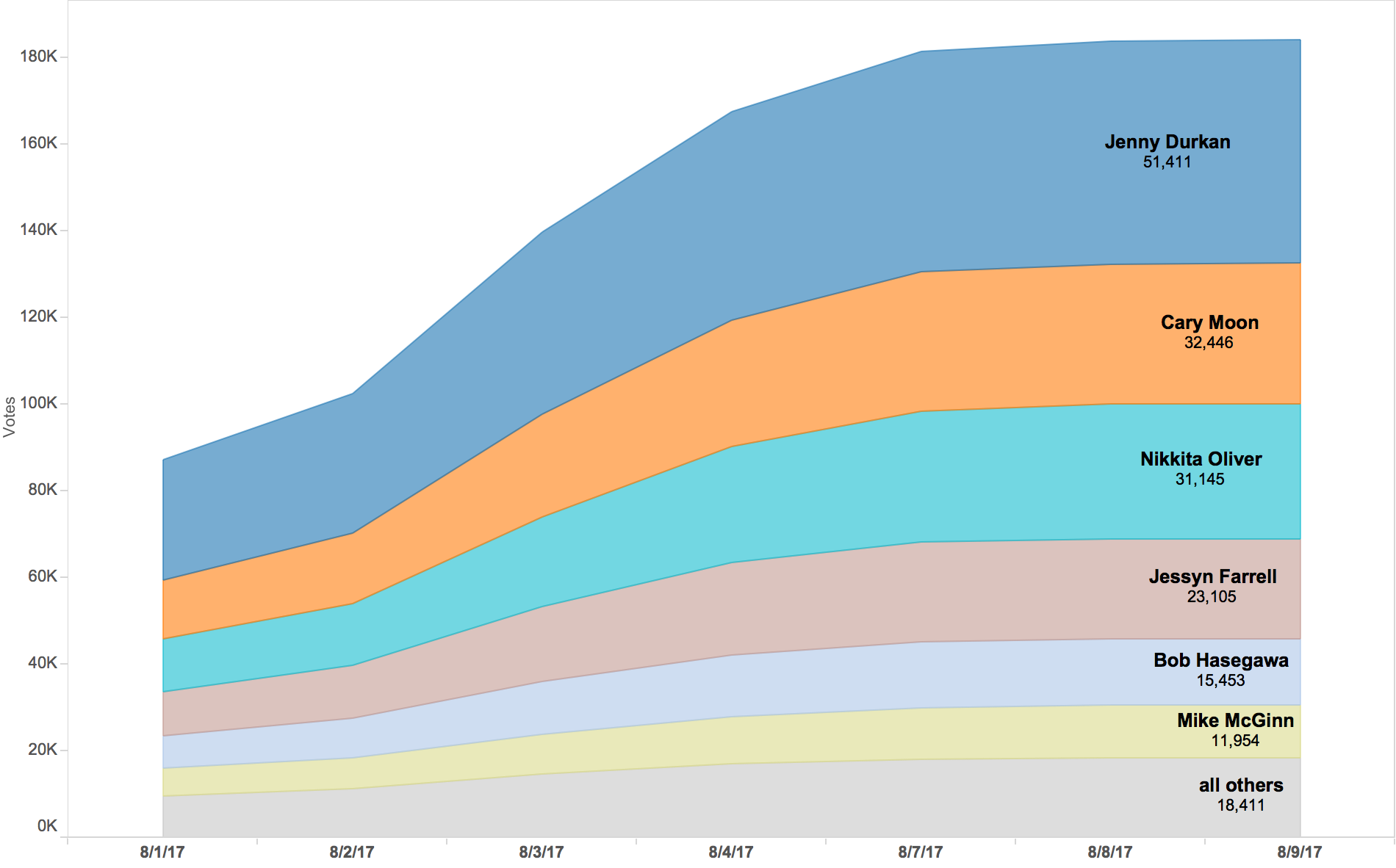
Area chart of cumulative votes counted for top six candidates, and all others grouped, showing vote counts by date from August 1 through August 9, 2017

Jenny Durkan and Cary Moon won the August 1 primary, with Durkan's 51,529 votes comprising 27.97% of the total, and Moon's 32,536 votes comprising 17.66%. Until the final result was certified on August 15, Moon's second-place finish was uncertain, with Nikkita Oliver running a close third with 17.02% of the total, or 31,366 votes, finishing 1,170 votes, or 0.63 percentage points behind Moon. The size of the top two candidates' leads shrank slightly as the daily counts were announced, but not enough to change the outcome. None of the three conceded, or claimed victory, until final tally. None of the leading candidates eliminated in the primary, Oliver, Farrell, O'Brien, or Hasegawa, had made any endorsements at that point.

The first day's preliminary count after the August 1 primary was 88,950 ballots, 19.18% of the 463,660 ballots sent to registered voters. The leaders in this initial count were Jenny Durkan with 27,579 votes or 31.6% of the ballots counted so far, Cary Moon with 13,583 or 15.56%, and Nikkita Oliver with 12,126 or 13.9%. Jessyn Farrell had 10,308 votes (11.81%), Bob Hasegawa 7,526 (8.62%), and Mike McGinn 6,247 (7.16%). The remaining 15 candidates, and write-ins, totaled 9,899 votes, or 11.3%. The Seattle Times, KUOW radio, and other local media predicted, after the initial count of about half what King County said was the expected turnout, that Seattle's next mayor would be a woman for the first time since Bertha Knight Landes was elected 91 years before, in 1926. They said Durkan appeared certain to have her name on the general election ballot, while Moon and Oliver, and perhaps Farrell, were in a toss-up to make it through the primary. The Stranger predicted that in the likely event of Moon or Oliver facing Durkan in the general, "Seattle's mayoral race will once again pit an establishment politician with deep Democratic ties against an outsider whose political influence grew from activism", whom Crosscut.com called "darlings of the left". Erica C. Barnett called the result a rejection of backward-looking "taking back" Seattle (Hasegawa) and "keeping Seattle" (McGinn).

By August 8, local media said Durkan and Moon appeared certain to have their names on the general election ballot, with 186,784 ballots counted representing 40.28% of registered voters, and about 1,200 Seattle ballots left. Most of the remaining ballots were awaiting signature challenges. Oliver had begun a campaign of 'ballot chasing', encouraging supporters whose ballots had been challenged to contact the elections office to defend them. Durkan and Moon said they supported Oliver's efforts to make sure every vote is counted. Durkan, with 27.96% was still secure in her position, while Moon's lead over Oliver had decreased to 1,362, larger than the number of remaining ballots. After an election is certified, a recount is mandatory when candidates are separated by very slim margins. Moon did not announce she had won, and Oliver did not concede. Moon said she contacted Farrell, Hasegawa, McGinn, and Oliver to begin discussing working together. Oliver signaled that if Moon moved to the general they would support Moon, while the others are waiting for the final results.

King County Elections certified the final result on August 15, with no significant changes from the late running totals, and Durkan and Moon remaining in the winning first and second positions. The 1,170 vote margin between Oliver and Moon met one of the criteria for an automatic recount, a separation of 2,000 or fewer votes, but the 0.63 percentage point difference was greater than the second criterion, a 0.5 or smaller percentage point margin. Oliver conceded after the results were announced, but did not endorse either Durkan or Moon, and said the People's Party would not make any endorsements.

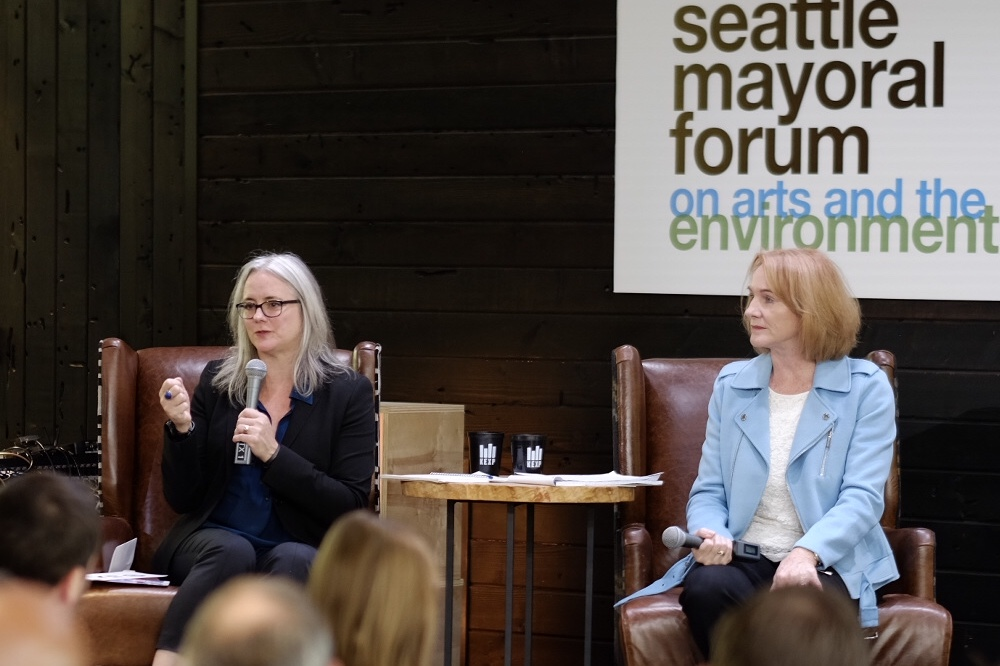
Cary Moon and Jenny Durkan at a candidate forum on October 2, 2017

Nonpartisan primary results by precinct Durkan: <20%; 20–30%; 30–40%; 40–50%; 50–60%; 60–70%; 70–80%; Moon: <20%; 20–30%; 30–40%; Oliver: <20%; 20–30%; 30–40%; 40–50%; 50–60%; Farrell: <20%; 20–30%; 30–40%; Hasegawa: <20%; 20–30%; 30–40%; No votes Tie

Primary August 1, 2017, final result, excluding write-ins
Candidate	Votes	%
Jenny Durkan	51,529	27.97
Cary Moon	32,536	17.66
Nikkita Oliver	31,366	17.02
Jessyn Farrell	23,160	12.57
Bob Hasegawa	15,500	8.41
Mike McGinn	12,001	6.51
Gary Brose	3,987	2.16
Harley Lever	3,340	1.81
Larry Oberto	3,089	1.68
Greg Hamilton	1,706	0.93
Michael Harris	1,401	0.76
Casey Carlisle	1,309	0.71
James W. Norton Jr.	988	0.54
Thom Gunn	455	0.25
Mary Juanita Martin	422	0.23
Jason Roberts	405	0.22
Lewis A. Jones	344	0.19
Alex Tsimerman	253	0.14
Keith J. Whiteman	174	0.10
Tiniell Cato	170	0.09
David Kane	114	0.06
Total votes	184,249	100

== General election ==
=== Debate ===
2017 Seattle mayoral election debate
No.	Date	Host	Moderator	Link	Nonpartisan	Nonpartisan
Key: P Participant A Absent N Not invited I Invited W Withdrawn						
Key: P Participant A Absent N Not invited I Invited W Withdrawn					Jenny Durkan	Cary Moon
1	Oct. 24, 2017	GeekWire; KING-TV; KUOW-FM; Seattle CityClub	Natalie Brand; Ross Reynolds		P	P

=== Results ===
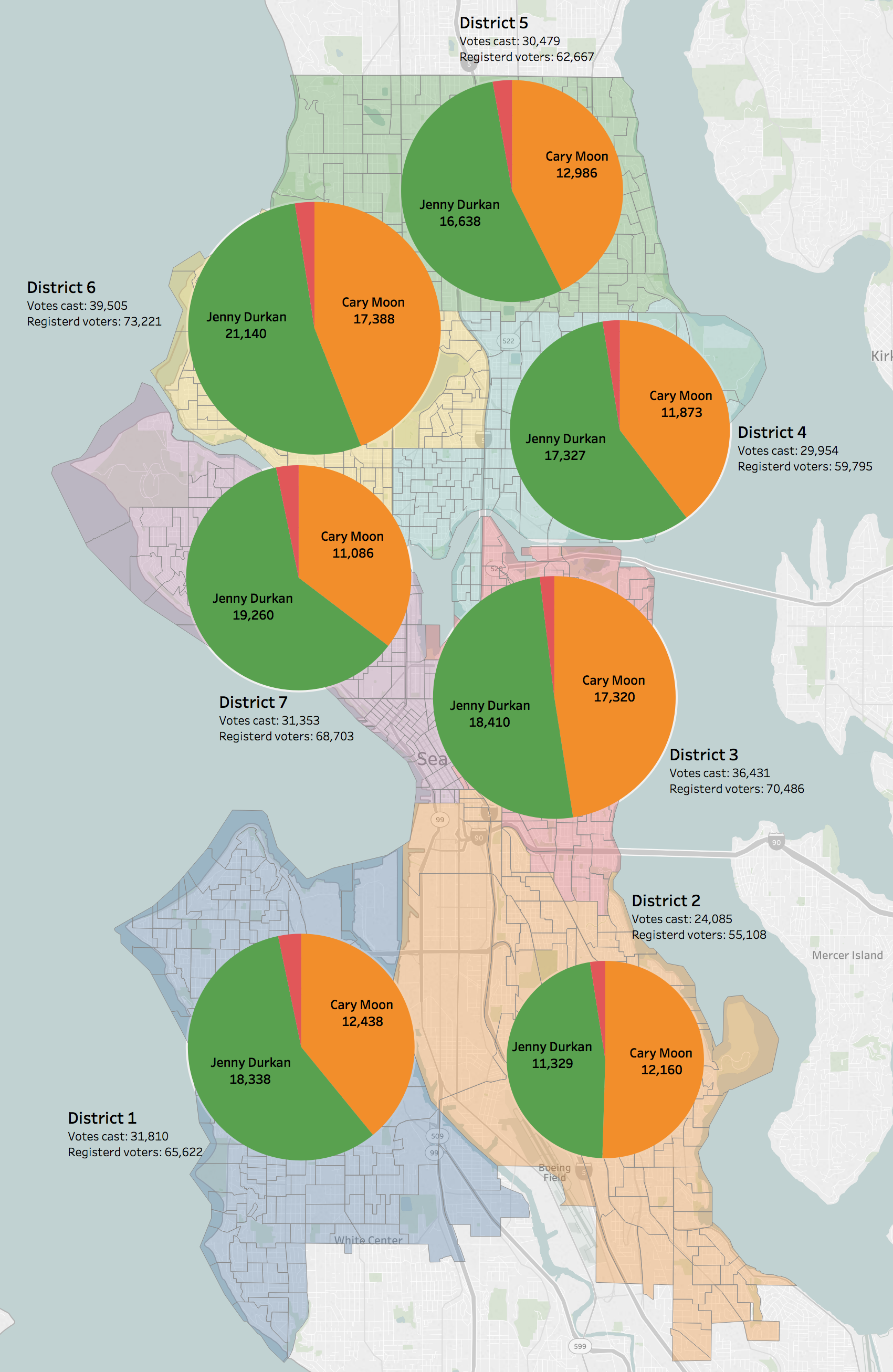
Results by city council district. Size shows votes cast, and candidates by color, Durkan in green and Moon in orange.

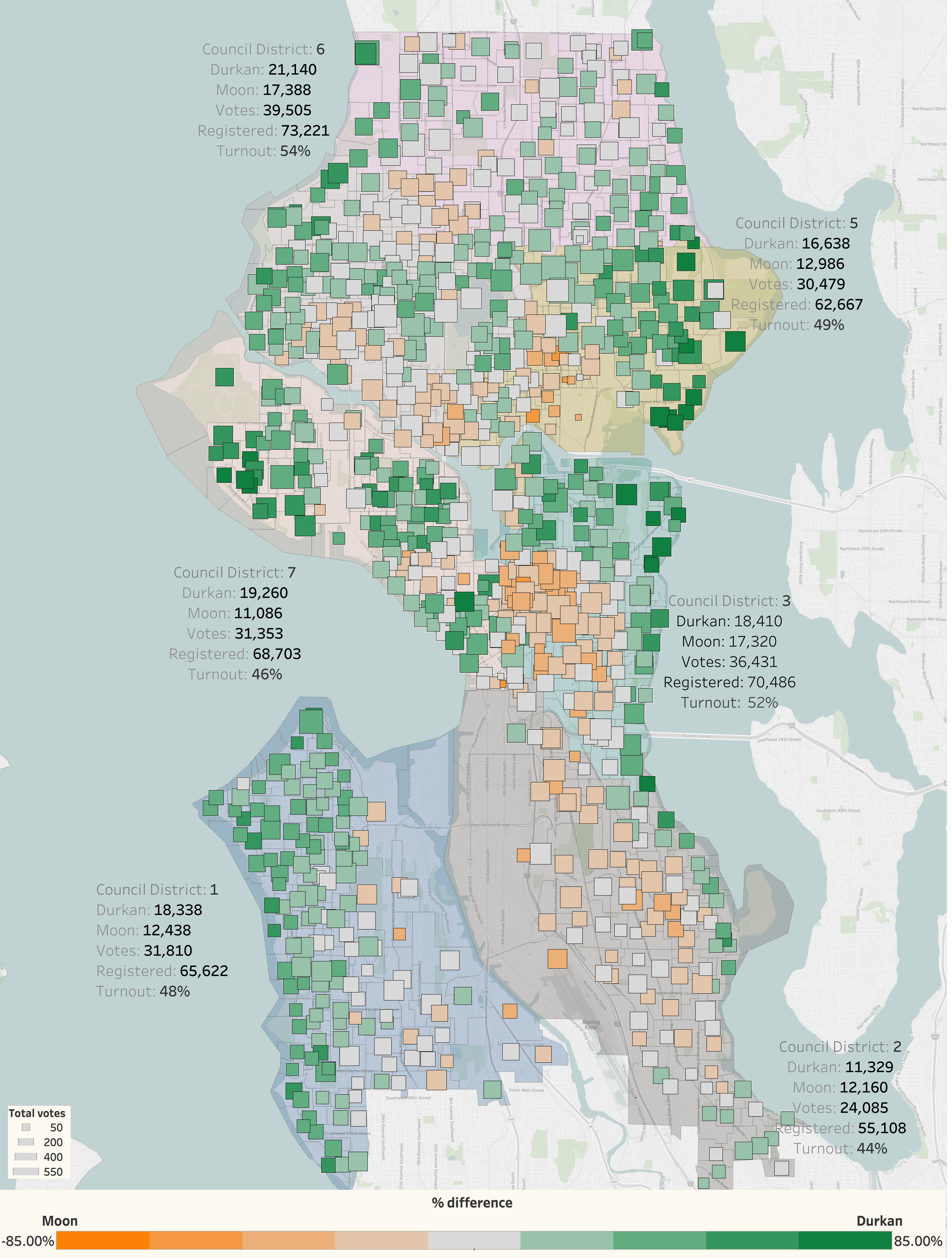
Final results by precinct. Size of square shows total votes cast. Precincts where Durkan had most votes are green, those where Moon was ahead are orange. Color intensity shows percentage point difference between candidates.

In the first preliminary returns, Durkan won nearly 61 percent of votes. The Seattle Times called the election for Durkan, predicting that her lead was too large for Moon to overcome in the uncounted ballots. King County Elections planned to finish counting ballots and certify the final result on November 28.

On November 8, Moon conceded to Durkan and offered her congratulations.

General election, November 7, 2017 preliminary results as of November 17, 2017 pending final count due November 28
Candidate	Votes	%
Jenny Durkan	122,442	56.25
Cary Moon	95,251	43.75
Total votes	217,693	100

Results by city council district
District	Jenny Durkan	Cary Moon	Write-in	Votes cast	Registered voters	Turnout %
1	18,338; 58%	12,438; 39%	1,034; 3%	31,810	65,622	48%
2	11,329; 47%	12,160; 50%	596; 2%	24,085	55,108	44%
3	18,410; 51%	17,320; 48%	701; 2%	36,431	70,486	52%
4	17,327; 58%	11,873; 40%	754; 3%	29,954	59,795	50%
5	16,638; 55%	12,986; 43%	855; 3%	30,479	62,667	49%
6	21,140; 54%	17,388; 44%	977; 2%	39,505	73,221	54%
7	19,260; 61%	11,086; 35%	1,007; 3%	31,353	68,703	46%
Total	122,442; 55%	95,251; 43%	5,924; 3%	223,617	455,602	49%
