= Cary Moon =

American political activist (born 1963)

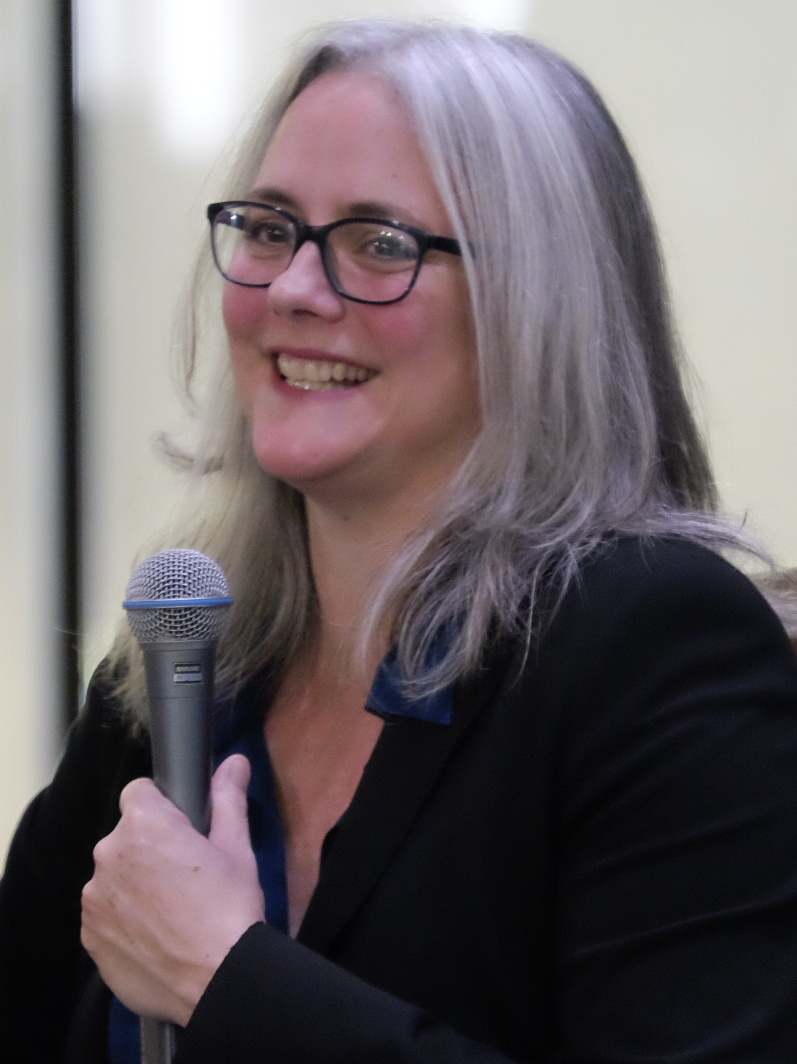
- Born: June 21, 1963 (age 62); Pennsylvania, U.S.
- Education: University of Michigan (BS); University of Pennsylvania (MArch)
- Occupation: Urban planner
- Political party: Democratic
- Spouse: Mark Reddington

Carol Consuela Moon (born June 21, 1963) is an American political activist who was part of the campaign to re-open Seattle's waterfront after the replacement of the Alaskan Way Viaduct. Moon was a candidate for Mayor of Seattle in the 2017 mayoral election, finishing second in the primary and advancing to face Jenny Durkan. During the general election, she trailed Durkan in preliminary results and conceded.

== Early life and education ==
Moon was born in Pennsylvania and raised in Buchanan, Michigan, one of seven siblings. The Moon family owned an industrial respirator manufacturing business, which Cary helped run in the early 1990s.

Moon attended the University of Michigan, earning a bachelor's degree in operations engineering, and later earned a master's degree in landscape architecture with a certificate in urban design from the University of Pennsylvania in 1997.

== Career ==
Moon moved to Seattle in 1998, establishing an urban design and landscape architecture firm named Landscape Agents and serving as its principal until 2006. One of the firm's major projects was a neighborhood plan for Pioneer Square that was commissioned by the city government.

Moon co-founded the People's Waterfront Coalition (PWC) with activist Grant Cogswell in 2004, in response to plans to replace the Alaskan Way Viaduct, an elevated freeway on the Seattle waterfront, with a new freeway. The PWC proposed a surface option, demolishing the viaduct in favor of a boulevard, parks, and transit priority instead of the proposed elevated structure or freeway tunnel. The viaduct replacement plan was rejected in a public referendum in March 2007, earning Moon a Stranger Genius Award from The Stranger. The group was ultimately unsuccessful in preventing construction of the replacement freeway tunnel, but the surface option was adopted along with a waterfront park.

=== 2017 mayoral campaign ===
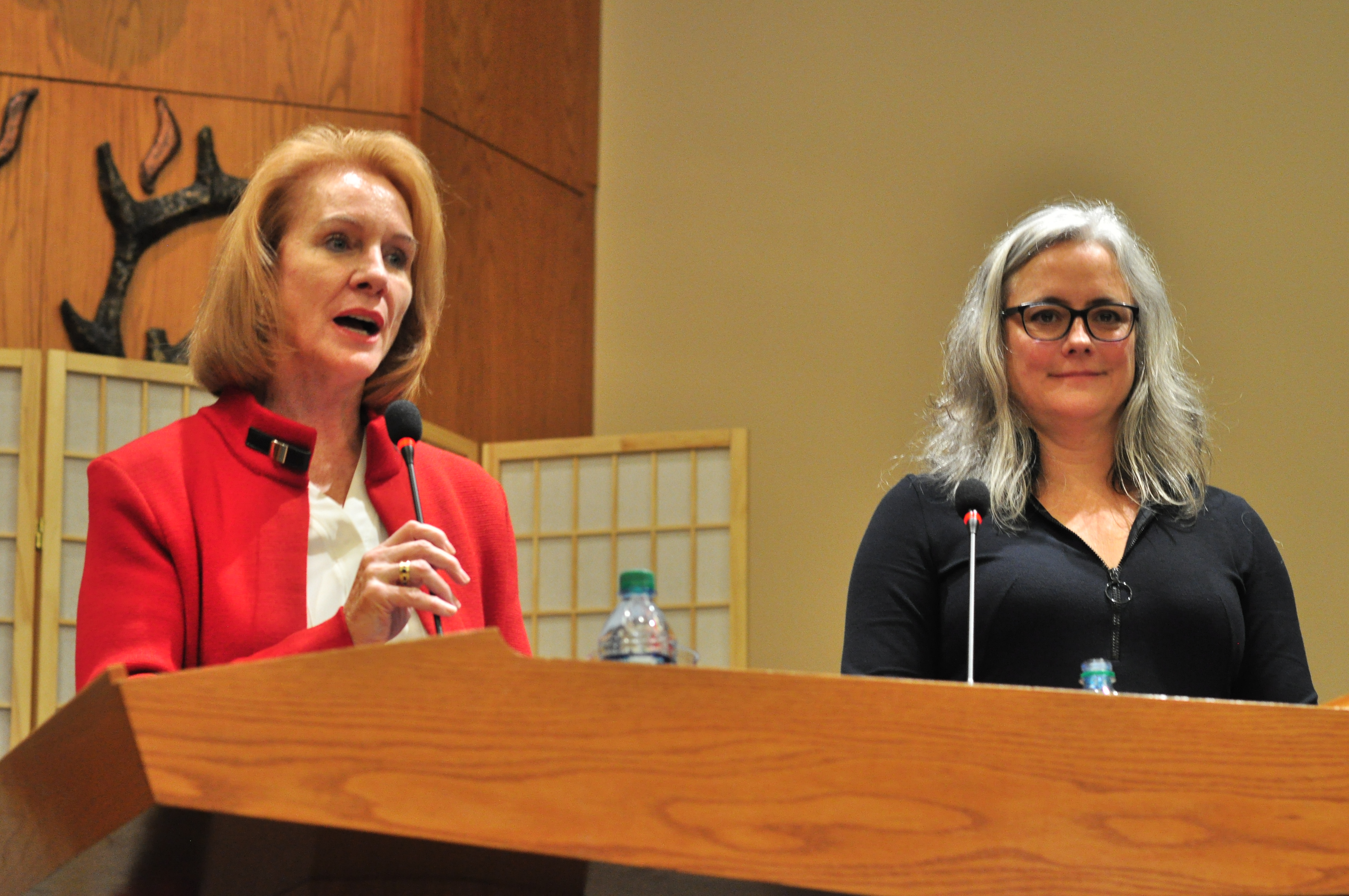
Moon and Jenny Durkan at a campaign forum in 2017.

Moon declared her candidacy for mayor of Seattle on April 17, 2017, running primarily on the issue of housing affordability in the city. This included a right-to-shelter housing policy for the homeless. Moon finished second in the August primary election, behind former U.S. Attorney Jenny Durkan, and advanced to the November general election. Moon finished narrowly ahead of activist Nikkita Oliver in the primary election, with a margin of 1,170 votes (0.6 percent). Moon finished 20 points behind Durkan in the initial returns on November 7. The following day, she conceded and congratulated Durkan.

== Personal life ==
Moon is married to Mark Reddington, a principal with LMN Architects, and has two teenage children. She divorced her first husband in 2005. She lives in a condominium near Pike Place Market in Downtown Seattle and has assets worth $4.1 million.
