= Martin Durkan =

American politician (1923–2005)

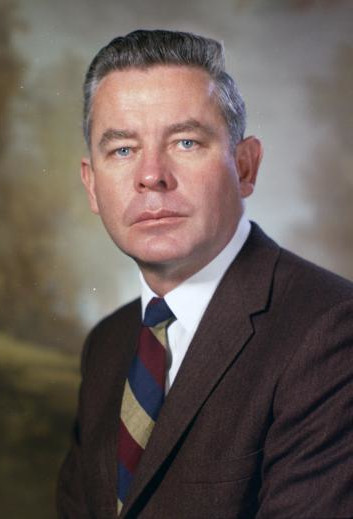
- Durkan in 1967

Member of the Washington Senate from the 47th district
- In office January 12, 1959 – January 13, 1975
- Preceded by: Constituency established
- Succeeded by: Kent Pullen

Member of the Washington House of Representatives from the 31st district
- In office January 14, 1957 – January 12, 1959
- Preceded by: Andy Hess
- Succeeded by: Norman B. Ackley

Personal details
- Born: Martin James Durkan; June 30, 1923 Great Falls, Montana, U.S.
- Died: May 29, 2005 (aged 81) Maui, Hawaii, U.S.
- Party: Democratic
- Spouse: Lorraine Noonan (m. 1951)
- Children: 8, including Jenny
- Education: University of Washington (LLB)

Military service
- Allegiance: United States
- Branch/service: United States Marine Corps; United States Navy
- Years of service: 1941–1945
- Rank: Lieutenant
- Battles/wars: World War II; Pacific War

Martin James Durkan Sr. (June 30, 1923 – May 29, 2005) was an American attorney, politician, and lobbyist from the state of Washington. He served as a member of the Washington House of Representatives from 1957 to 1959 and in the State Senate from 1959 to 1975. Durkan also ran unsuccessfully for Governor of Washington in 1972 and the U.S. House of Representatives in 1977.

After his retirement from the Senate, Durkan became one of the state's top lobbyists. He raised eight children with his wife Lorraine, including former Seattle mayor and U.S. attorney Jenny Durkan.

== Early life and education ==
Martin Durkan was born to a Catholic family in Great Falls, Montana, on June 30, 1923. His father, Martin Durkan, had emigrated from County Mayo, Ireland and served one term in the Montana House of Representatives as the Democratic representative from Cascade County from 1913 to 1914. His mother was a schoolteacher.

Durkan attended Gonzaga University in Spokane, Washington. He volunteered for the United States Marine Corps a week after the Attack on Pearl Harbor, soon transferring to the U.S. Navy and receiving training at the Naval V12 program at the University of Washington. He was commissioned an ensign at Northwestern University in 1943, earning the rank of lieutenant. He fought with the Navy amphibious squad in the South Pacific Theater of World War II, and was injured in Saipan. He spent 16 months recovering in naval hospitals in California and Seattle and was awarded the Asiatic-Pacific Area Ribbon with 3 stars, the World War II victory Medal and the Good Conduct Medal. While at the University of Washington Durkan met student Lorraine "Lolly" Noonan, whom he began a relationship with and later married in 1951.

He earned a law degree from the University of Washington School of Law in 1953 and established a private practice in Seattle.

== Career ==
Durkan began his political career when he was elected the third vice president of King County Young Men's Democratic Club in November 1955. In February 1956 he appeared on a televised panel discussion called "Will Re-Districting Work", alongside State Senators Albert Rosellini, John Ryder and State Representative R. Mort Frayn. He continued to appear on panel discussion groups in regards to Initiative 199 as a Democratic committee member.

Durkan was elected to the Washington House of Representatives in 1956, defeating Republican William Crow to win the 31st district. He was a member of the Subcommittee on Ways and Means, which urged Governor Rosellini to veto Initiative 199 after it was approved by voters the previous year.

In November 1958, Durkan was elected State Senator of Washington's 47th district, receiving 10,319 votes to Republican John B. Stander's 5,054 votes. In 1961 the Washington State Liquor Control Board was accused of over-purchasing liquor from distilleries, forcing the state to sell the excess liquor at reduced prices. Many distilleries were represented by close associates of politicians, such as Durkan's brother Thomas.

In 1963 Durkan became chairperson of the Subcommittee on Revenue and Regulatory Agencies. He drafted legislation allowing the Seattle Center Monorail of the 1962 World's Fair to be owned an operated by the state instead of the city, which Rosellini was against. He introduced a bill to remove tax exemption from cooperative apartment buildings for senior citizens. After reducing budgetary spending on funding for mentally handicapped people, he introduced legislation to close Northern State Hospital in Sedro-Woolley. He was the Western Washington campaign manager for President Lyndon B. Johnson's 1964 presidential campaign.

In 1965 Durkan organized a public hearing on former Governor Rosellini's tax plan. The Seattle Times called this Durkan's "first move" towards a run for governor in 1968, and introduced him to eastern Washington voters. He continued campaigning throughout the state.

== Personal life ==
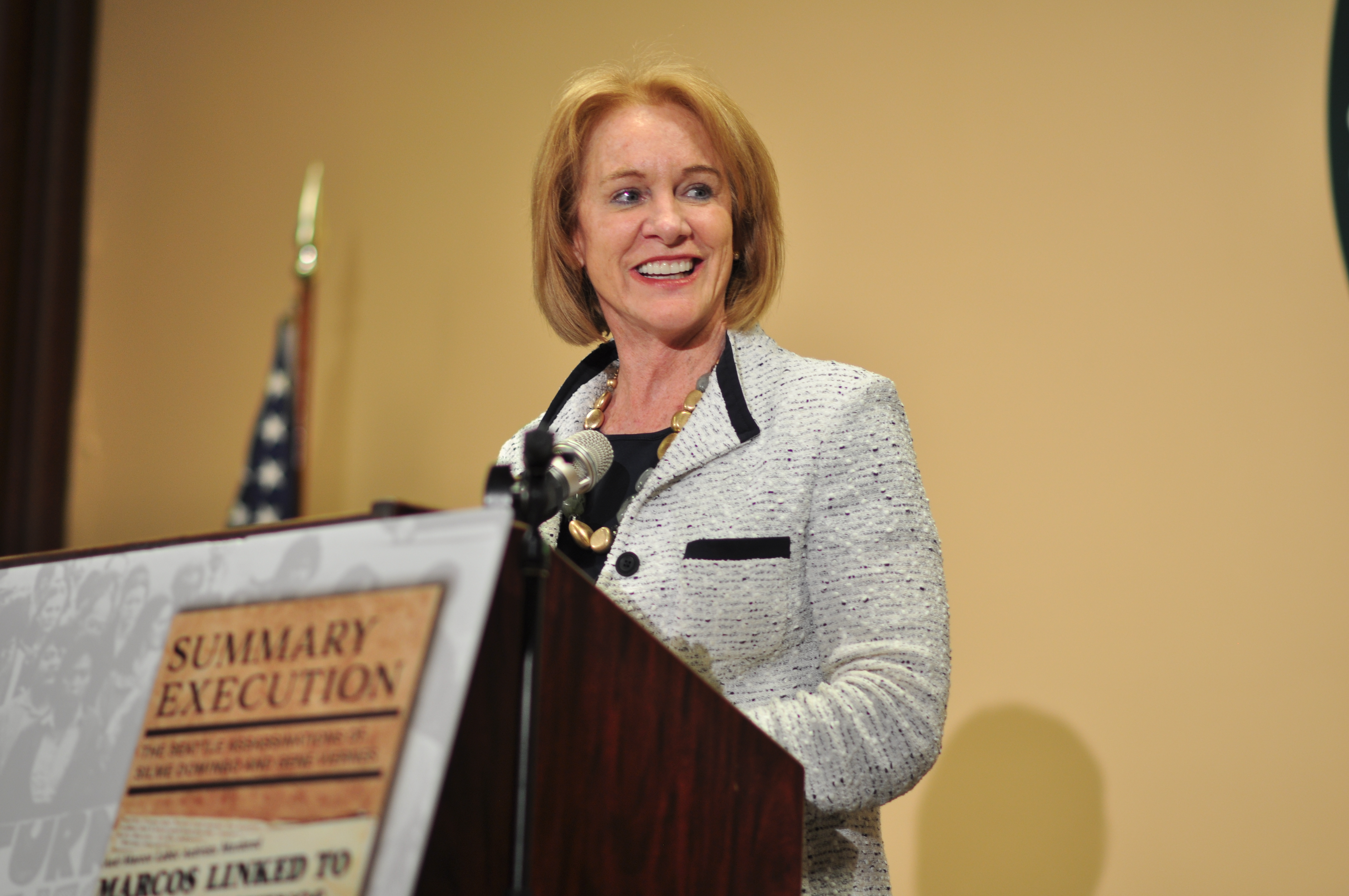
Seattle mayor Jenny Durkan, his fourth child, in 2018

Durkan lived on Mercer Island in the mid-1950s and later Bellevue before settling in Issaquah in 1963. Durkan was Roman Catholic.

Durkan and his wife Lorraine had seven children, including Seattle mayor Jenny Durkan. They also raised the late David Grant from the age of 12 after his parents moved out of state.

Durkan was a member of the Alpha Tau Omega fraternity, the Auburn Elk's club, the Veteran of Foreign Wars, the American Legion and the Washington Athletic Club and was President of the Horseman's Associations for owners and trainers. The Emerald Downs horse race track presents an annual "Martin Durkan award" which "honors trainers that exhibit leadership, cooperation, sportsmanship and excellence on and off the track throughout the 75-day meeting." The award has been presented since the 1970s and was previously called the "Steve O'Donnell Award".

Durkan had six grandchildren: Jamie, Danny, Taryn, Colman, James and Teegan. In his later years, Durkan and his wife retired to Maui, Hawaii. Durkan suffered a heart attack in November 1996 and was in poor health for the last few years of his life; having another heart attack in mid-May 2005. He died on May 29, 2005, at Maui Memorial Medical Center.

== See also ==
- List of United States political families
