= Jenny Durkan =

American politician (born 1958)

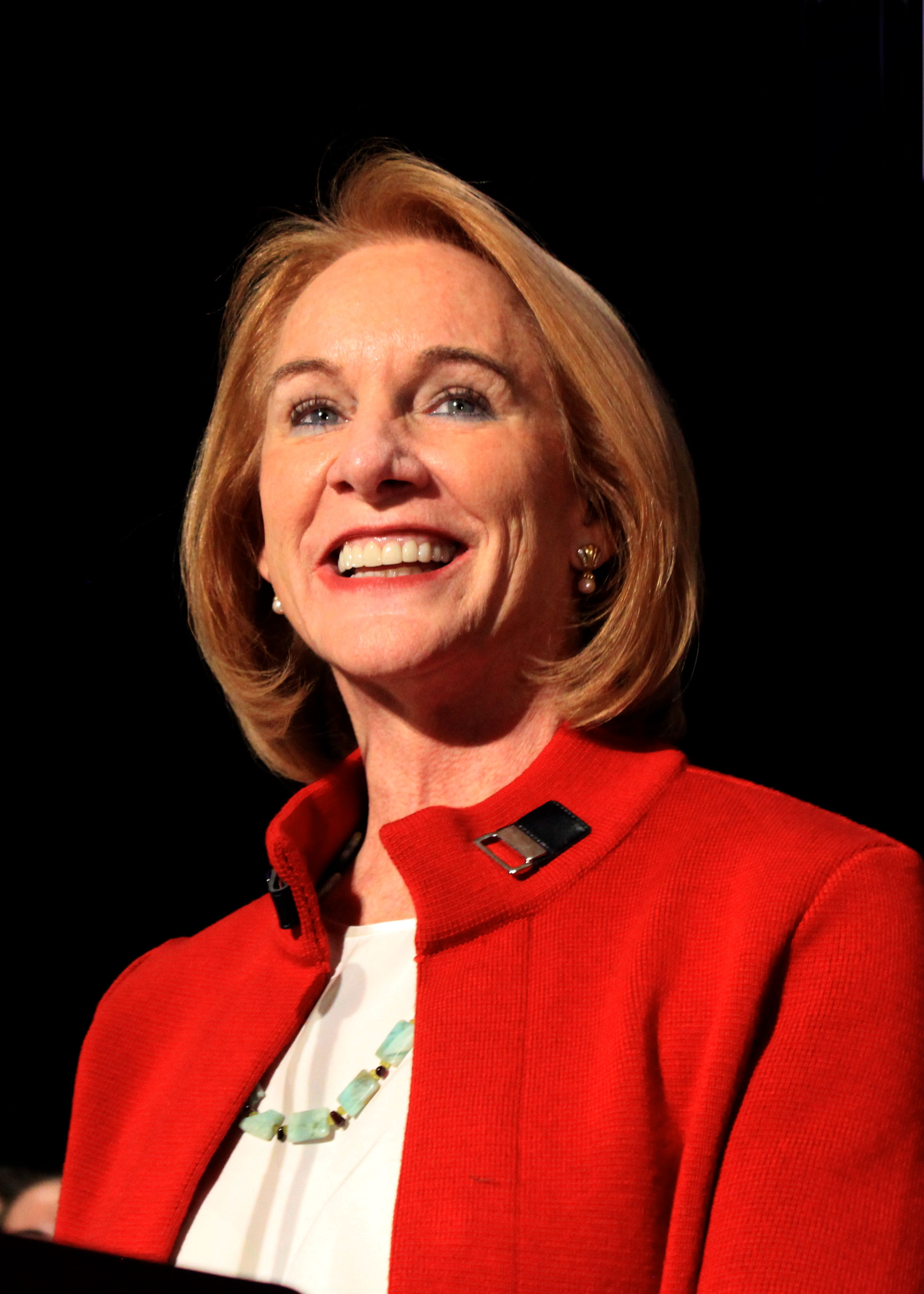
- Durkan in 2018

56th Mayor of Seattle
- In office November 28, 2017 – January 1, 2022
- Preceded by: Tim Burgess
- Succeeded by: Bruce Harrell

United States Attorney for the Western District of Washington
- In office October 1, 2009 – September 30, 2014
- President: Barack Obama
- Preceded by: John McKay
- Succeeded by: Brian T. Moran

Personal details
- Born: Jenny Anne Durkan; May 19, 1958 (age 68) Seattle, Washington, U.S.
- Party: Democratic
- Spouse: Dana Garvey
- Relatives: Martin Durkan (father)
- Education: University of Notre Dame (BA); University of Washington (JD)

Jenny Anne Durkan (born May 19, 1958) is an American attorney, former federal prosecutor, and politician who served as the 56th mayor of Seattle, Washington. She is the daughter of Martin Durkan. Durkan is a member of the Democratic Party. After earning her Juris Doctor from University of Washington School of Law in 1985, Durkan began practicing law as a criminal defense lawyer and civil litigator. In October 2009, President Barack Obama appointed her United States Attorney for the Western District of Washington. She held that position until September 2014.

Durkan was elected the 56th mayor of Seattle in 2017, becoming the city's first female mayor since the 1920s, its second openly LGBT elected mayor, and first elected mayor born in Seattle. She took first place in the nonpartisan August primary and defeated urban planner and political activist Cary Moon in the November general election. She and her partner, Dana Garvey, have two sons.

Durkan was criticized for her response to the George Floyd protests in Seattle and her handling of protesters and law enforcement in the Capitol Hill Autonomous Zone. In December 2020, she announced that she would not seek reelection after the end of her mayoral term.

== Early life and education ==
Jenny Durkan was born in Seattle on May 19, 1958. She was raised in a large Irish Catholic family of eight siblings. The family lived on Mercer Island in the mid-1950s and Bellevue in the early 1960s, before settling in rural Issaquah during a time "when there [wasn't] any development." Her father, Martin Durkan, was a prominent Seattle-area lawyer, Democratic legislator, and lobbyist whose career included 16 years in the state Senate and two unsuccessful runs for governor. Her mother was primarily a homemaker who supported her husband's career, though she eventually became an executive editor of the Ballard News-Tribune and wrote editorials.

Durkan attended Forest Ridge School of the Sacred Heart, a private Catholic girls' school in Washington State. She spent part of her junior year of high school as an exchange student in London and said that "the best part of the experience was traveling through England to Scotland, France, Austria, Switzerland and Germany." A high-school classmate of Durkan's remembers her as "super independent, and rough-and-tumble…strong-willed and adventurous."

Durkan earned her B.A. degree from the University of Notre Dame in 1980. At Notre Dame, she tried out for the basketball team before being cut and ending up as the team's statistician.

After graduating, Durkan spent two years in Alaska, teaching high-school English and coaching a girls' basketball team in the Yup'ik community through the Jesuit Volunteer Corps. After a summer working as a baggage handler for Wien Air Alaska in St. Mary's, Alaska, as a dues-paying Teamster, Durkan enrolled in the University of Washington School of Law, earning her J.D. degree in 1985. "I wanted to be a lawyer since I was 5 years old," she told the Seattle Post-Intelligencer in 1992. "When I graduated from law school, my mother said, "Finally someone is going to pay you to argue."'

== Private practice ==
While in law school, Durkan participated in a pilot criminal defense clinic, working with the public defender's office to represent individuals charged in Seattle municipal court. She continued the work on a pro bono basis, until she moved to Washington, D.C. to practice law with the firm of Williams & Connolly.

In 1991, Durkan returned to Seattle to join the law firm of Schroeter Goldmark & Bender, and she established a successful practice focusing on criminal defense and work on behalf of plaintiffs, including the family of Lt. Walter Kilgore, who died in the Pang warehouse fire, the case of Stan Stevenson (a retired firefighter who was stabbed leaving a Mariners game) and the case of Kate Fleming, who died in a flash flood in her Madison Valley basement during the Hanukkah Eve windstorm of 2006.

In 1994 Durkan became the executive council and political director to Governor Mike Lowry, making her Lowry's chief lawyer. Lowry had been a campaign manager to and protege of her father in 1972, and Durkan worked for then congressman Lowry in the 1980s. After initially recommending that an independent investigator represent Lowry, Durkan resigned in February 1995 after deputy press secretary Susanne Albright accused him of sexual harassment.

Among Durkan's most prominent cases in private practice was the 2005 recount lawsuit that attempted to undo Governor Chris Gregoire's election in 2004. The Democratic Party turned to Durkan with Gregoire's election "facing an unprecedented trial and Republicans trying to remove her from office." Gregoire's victory was upheld.

In January 2017, Durkan worked with families and other attorneys at Seattle-Tacoma International Airport to obtain a federal court order, the day President Donald Trump's first travel ban executive order went into effect, blocking the deportation of people who had arrived at the airport from seven predominantly Muslim countries.

After serving as U.S. Attorney for the Western District of Washington, Durkan joined Quinn Emanuel Urquhart & Sullivan to head a new Seattle law office specializing in internet and online security issues. At Quinn Emanuel, she also represented FIFA as one of the lawyers conducting an independent internal investigation of issues related to a global corruption case brought by Swiss authorities and the U.S. Justice Department. The investigation and related actions by FIFA's Ethics Committee led to the ousting of longtime FIFA President Sepp Blatter and his key deputy Jerome Valcke, as well as a restructuring of the FIFA Executive Committee and World Cup processes.

== Civic leader ==
Durkan served on the Washington State Sentencing Guidelines Commission from 1993 to 1996. She served as the first Citizen Observer on the Seattle Police Firearms Review Board from 1997 to 2000 and two Seattle mayors asked her to serve on Citizen Review Committees for the Seattle Police Department. She also played an advisory role on the establishment of the King County Drug Court and the Mental Health Court. She later helped create a specialized drug program in the federal courts in Western Washington.

In September 1994, Durkan left the Schroeter law firm to join the staff of then-Washington Governor Mike Lowry as his lawyer and political adviser. In February 1995, she resigned from Lowry's office and returned to Schroeter.

Durkan is a fellow in the American College of Trial Lawyers and maintains an AV rating from Martindale-Hubbell. She served a three-year term on the Washington State Bar Association Board of Governors. She served on the Merit Selection Committee for the United States District Court, helping select the candidates for appointment to seven vacancies in the federal judiciary in the Western District of Washington.

Durkan served on the nonprofit board of the Center for Women and Democracy from 2000 to 2009, as a founding Board Member for the Seattle Police Foundation from 2002 to 2004, and as the Chair of the Washington State Attorney General's Task Force on Consumer Privacy, which resulted in legislation that became a national model for identity theft protections.

== U.S. Attorney ==
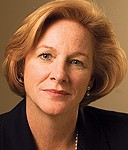
Durkan during her tenure as a U.S. Attorney

In May 2009, President Barack Obama nominated Durkan to be the U.S Attorney for the Western District of Washington, which covers 19 counties and is home to 4.6 million people (78% of the state's population). She was unanimously confirmed by the United States Senate on September 29, 2009, and sworn in on October 1 by Chief U.S. District Judge Robert S. Lasnik.

While U.S. Attorney, Durkan created a Civil Rights Department in the office. It coordinates a variety of civil rights cases and outreach, including a number of cases on behalf of returning veterans. She also helped push police reform efforts in the Seattle Police Department after a Department of Justice investigation found a pattern and practice of excessive use of force.

Upon taking office, Durkan was appointed to serve on the Attorney General's Advisory Committee, which advises the U.S. Attorney General on policy, management, and operational issues at the Department of Justice. She was chair of the Attorney General's Subcommittee on Cybercrime and Intellectual Property Enforcement. Durkan played a leading role in prosecuting cybercrimes, including hacking, skimming and identity theft. Durkan worked with the public schools to ensure internet safety tips for parents and kids were sent home with kids at the beginning of the school year. She also focused on terrorism and national security issues, including the prosecution of two men who plotted to blow up a military recruitment facility in Seattle.

As U.S. Attorney, Durkan used the federal law against felons possessing firearms to crack down on career criminals in Western Washington. Cases referred for felons-with-guns charges increased 45% during her tenure. Durkan pushed "hot spot" initiatives in high-crime areas to address drug and gun sales. These investigations and law enforcement operations resulted in dozens of arrests and weapons confiscations.

In September 2014, when U.S. Attorney General Eric Holder announced his intention to step down, Durkan was widely discussed as a potential candidate to succeed him. The Obama administration nominated Loretta Lynch.

=== 2011 medical marijuana legislation ===
On April 14, 2011, Durkan and Michael C. Ormsby, the U.S. Attorney for the Eastern District of Washington, responded to a request for guidance from Washington governor Christine Gregoire. They warned that a bill proposing to revise state-level medical marijuana laws could "authorize conduct contrary to federal law" and indicated that the Justice Department would continue to pursue criminal or civil actions for any violations of the federal government's Controlled Substances Act.

In November 2011, the federal Drug Enforcement Administration (DEA) raided ten Seattle medical marijuana dispensaries. After the raids, marijuana activists criticized Durkan. The DEA's search warrants suggested the dispensaries were involved in illicit drug dealing and money laundering, and City Councilman Tim Burgess said the raided shops were "operating well outside the medical provisions". Durkan asserted that the dispensaries in question were believed to be concealing criminal activity behind the state's medical marijuana law and that authorities would not ignore flagrant violations.

=== 2012 May Day vandalism response ===
The 2012 May Day protests in Seattle included violent rioting, damage, and a proclamation of civil emergency by Mayor Mike McGinn. Durkan's office headed the prosecution that followed the vandalizing of Seattle's William Kenzo Nakamura U.S. Courthouse during the protests. In the months after the protests, at least five suspected rioters were criminally charged. Those arrests were part of a much wider FBI investigation that both preceded and followed the events of May 1, 2012.

Federal grand jury investigations were formed in Seattle and Portland, and the FBI engaged in raids and issued subpoenas to suspected "anarchists". Under grand jury rules, they could be asked a wide range of questions about themselves and people they knew, in secret proceedings without a defense lawyer present.

Four individuals refused to testify before the Seattle grand jury, even after being granted use immunity, which impaired their right to refuse to testify. They were sent to jail for refusing to testify by U.S. District Judge Richard A. Jones, and spent several months at the Federal Detention Center, SeaTac, including time in solitary confinement. The justification given for this by a spokeswoman for Durkan's office was that it was "coercive" and could lead them to testify, rather than being "punitive."

The Department of Justice and Durkan's office were widely criticized. The Seattle chapter of the National Lawyers Guild condemned their actions, "urging the FBI and the US Attorney to end the raids and drop the grand jury subpoenas" and raising concerns about political intimidation and negative effects on free speech. The ACLU raised concerns that the grand juries might be used as a "fishing expedition looking into people's political views and political associations." The Seattle Human Rights Commission opposed the use of solitary confinement as a human rights violation. On February 27, 2013, District Judge Richard A. Jones issued a court order for the release of Matt Duran and Katherine Olejnik. That was followed by the release of Maddy Pfeiffer. Durkan's office refused to answer questions about the decision-making process of bringing people before the grand jury, saying that it would "not discuss the status of investigations or the deliberative process."

=== 2013 police informant incident ===
In 2013, Durkan prosecuted Walli Mujahidh and Abu Khalid Abdul-Latif for conspiring to kill US military personnel on July 4, 2011, in a terrorist plot. The FBI and SPD had used a convicted child rapist, Robert Childs, as a paid informant to infiltrate terrorist and other organizations. Childs and Seattle Police detective Samuel DeJesus deleted over 400 messages from Childs's phone before handing the evidence over to Durkan's office, which presiding judge James Robart called "at-best sloppy". Durkan defended using Childs as an informant, saying, "It's not the saints who can bring us the sinners." Childs was sentenced to life in prison in January 2022 after being convicted of raping a 12-year-old girl in Seattle in 2006.

== 2017 mayoral election ==
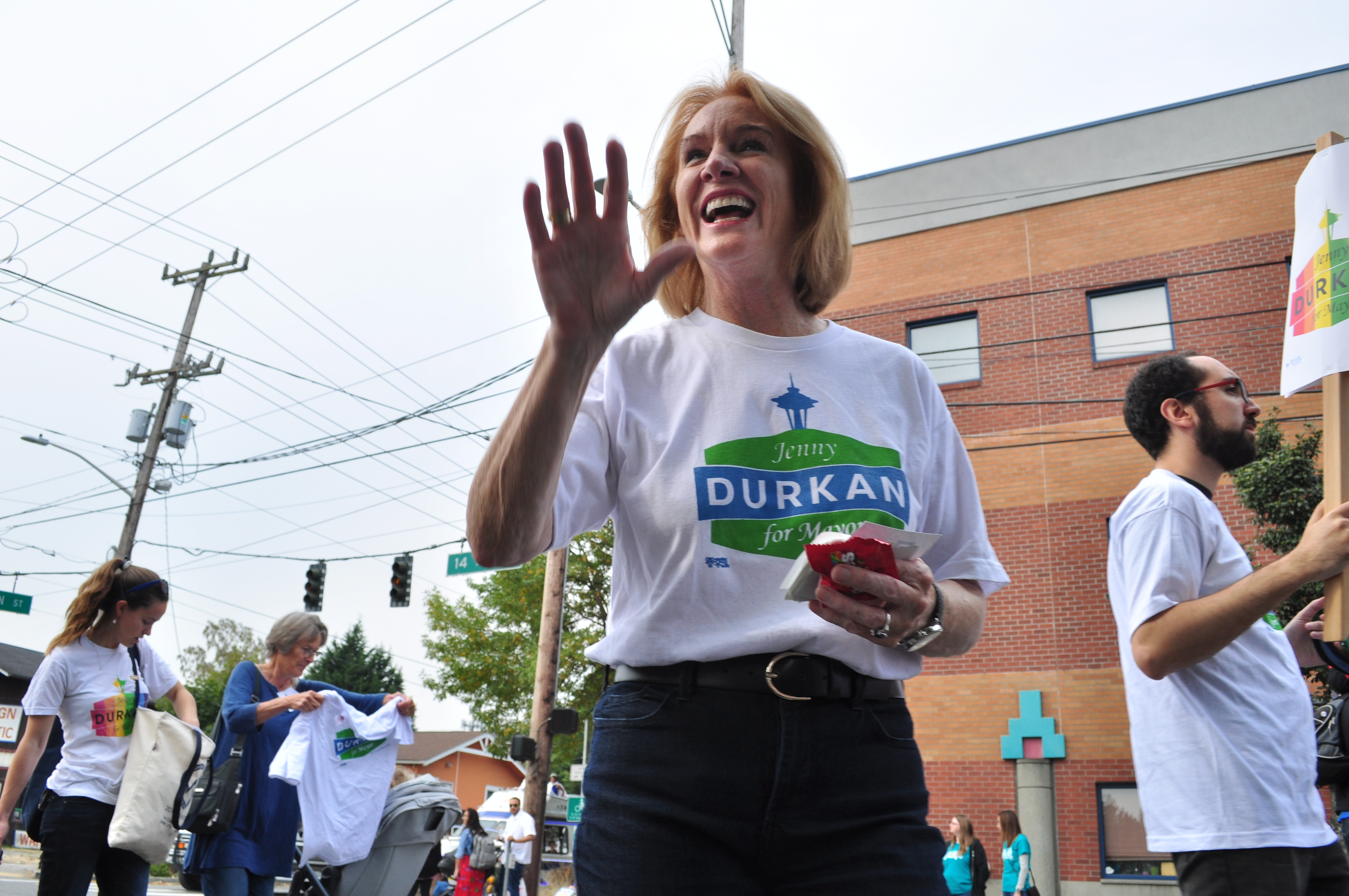
Durkan at Seattle's Fiestas Patrias Parade in September 2017

Durkan announced her candidacy for Seattle mayor on May 11, 2017, shortly after incumbent Mayor Ed Murray ended his reelection campaign and resigned as mayor due to allegations of repeated sexual offenses that were later settled by the city. Durkan was called the "establishment" candidate in the crowded primary field, and was endorsed by the King County MLK Labor Council, former Attorney General Eric Holder, the Alliance for Gun Responsibility Victory Fund, Human Rights Campaign, Governor Jay Inslee, Attorney General Bob Ferguson, the Gay & Lesbian Victory Fund, former EPA Administrator Lisa P. Jackson, former governor and commerce secretary Gary Locke, former Seattle mayor Norm Rice, former King County Executive and Deputy Secretary of U.S. Housing and Urban Development Ron Sims, Murray, some members of the Seattle City Council, labor unions, The Seattle Times, and the Seattle Metropolitan Chamber of Commerce.

Durkan placed first in the August primary election with 51,529 votes (28%), advancing to the general election against urban planner Cary Moon, who received 32,536 (18%), narrowly edging Nikkita Oliver, who received 31,366 (17%). Durkan's over $1 million fundraising haul broke the record for most donors and most money raised in the history of Seattle mayoral campaigns. She outraised Moon 5 to 1, with over $600,000 coming from a political organization sponsored by the Seattle Metropolitan Chamber of Commerce, allowing large corporations such as Amazon, CenturyLink, Comcast, Vulcan, and Starbucks to quietly influence a major local campaign. Murray's political consultant Sandeep Kaushik joined Durkan's campaign and later became a senior adviser to her. Kaushik is also a lobbyist for Comcast and continues to advise Durkan on policy. The day after the November 7 general election, in which Durkan received over 60% of the preliminary votes, Moon conceded.

=== Candidate forum incident ===
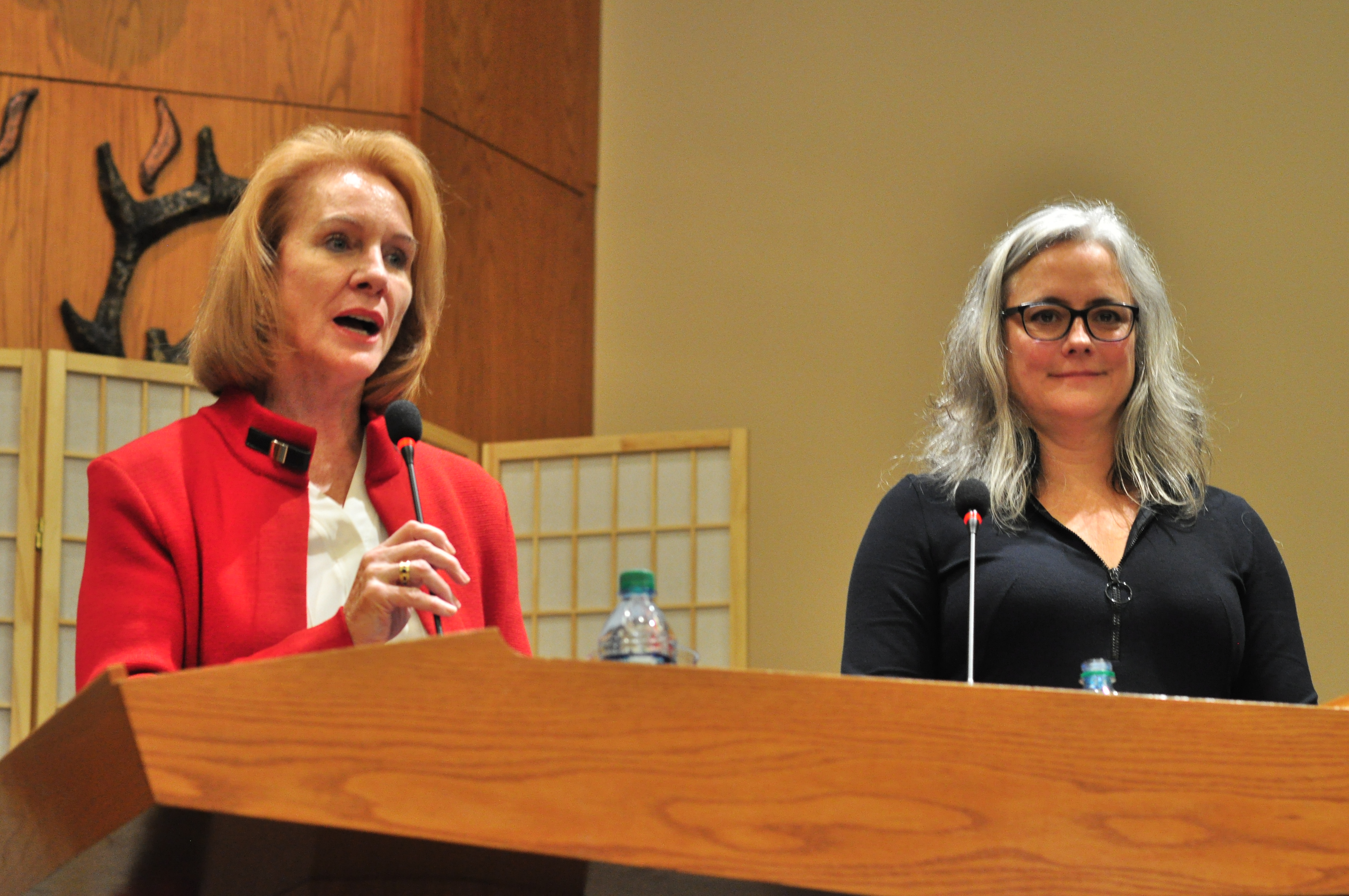
Durkan and Cary Moon at a candidate forum on October 26, 2017

During a July 2017 mayoral candidate forum, Durkan tossed miniature tequila bottles into the all-ages crowd and during the "talent competition" imitated Melissa McCarthy's parody of then-White House press secretary Sean Spicer from Saturday Night Live in costume, at one point using the term "colored person" while impersonating Spicer. The forum judge at the event told her that she should have said "person of color", and she apologized as soon as she took the stage again, saying she had tripped over her words. She later apologized for distributing the tequila, saying she had thought the event, held at late night music venue Neumos, was for people 21 and over.

=== Initiative 124 ===
During the 2017 Seattle mayoral election, Durkan was the only candidate to not sign a letter requesting that Seattle hotel owners, represented by the Seattle Hospitality for Progress PAC and Washington Hospitality PAC, drop a lawsuit against Initiative 124. The initiative gave "hotel workers more protections against sexual harassment and assault" and was passed by Seattle voters in 2016. Durkan claimed that she was not given the opportunity to sign the letter, but Unite Here Local 8 (the union representing hotel workers) said that Durkan chose not to sign the letter after multiple requests. Durkan's campaign received $50,000 from the two PACs, including $20,000 from Seattle luxury hotel developer Richard Hedreen. In 2002. Durkan's sister Ryan and brother Jamie lobbied the Seattle City Council on Hedreen's behalf, asking it to exempt him from building $6 million of low-income housing in downtown Seattle. After pressure from council member Nick Licata, Mayor Greg Nickels vetoed the legislation. The Washington State Court of Appeals overturned Initiative 124 in 2018.

== Mayor of Seattle ==
After becoming mayor, Durkan faced local, regional, and global crises, including homelessness, lack of affordable housing, crumbling infrastructure, and the COVID-19 pandemic, much of it stemming from Seattle's rapid population growth during the 2010s.

On her second day in office, Durkan signed an Executive Order to create the Seattle Promise College Tuition Program to expand free access to college for Seattle public school students. She then proposed the Families, Education, Preschool, and Promise levy, which would double the number of kids able to attend the Seattle Preschool Program from 1,500 to 2,700 in 2025–26, maintain and expand school-based health centers, create and maintain year-round learning programs to close the opportunity gap from K-12, and fully fund two years of free college. In November 2018, nearly 70 percent of Seattle voters approved the plan.

Durkan was cited as one of the key advocates for the bringing of the NHL team the Kraken to Seattle. In 2018 she co-drafted a Domestic Workers Bill of Rights for people in the industry in Seattle. She also crafted legislation to raise the pay rate for rideshare workers, and signed new gun restrictions into law. In June 2019, to mark the 50th anniversary of the Stonewall riots, Queerty named Durkan one of the Pride50 "trailblazing individuals who actively ensure society remains moving towards equality, acceptance and dignity for all queer people".

=== Criticism of Donald Trump ===
Durkan has been an outspoken critic of President Trump throughout her time in office. Trump criticized the responses of Durkan and Governor Jay Inslee, claiming that they had not been effective in dealing with protesters, especially regarding the Capitol Hill Autonomous Zone/Capitol Hill Occupied Protest and the Seattle police's abandonment of the East Precinct. He threatened to retake the city if local leaders did not reassert their authority. Durkan called the creation of the police-free autonomous zone an attempt to "de-escalate interactions between protesters and law enforcement". On June 12, she visited the police-free zone and told a New York Times reporter that she did not know of any serious crime reported in the area. Throughout her tenure as mayor, Durkan has drawn criticism from the Trump administration, including threatening federal funding for the City of Seattle for being a "Welcoming City" and an "anarchist jurisdiction." In September 2020, The New York Times reported that the Department of Justice had explored criminal charges against Durkan, which she called "chilling".

=== Transportation ===
During Durkan's term as mayor, the Seattle Department of Transportation canceled several bicycle lanes and greenway projects that had been planned in previous years under the city's comprehensive bicycle plan and funded in the 2015 Move Seattle levy. In response, several cycling advocacy groups and city council members protested Durkan's decision-making on bicycle issues. She has also been critical of scooter-sharing, with Seattle maintaining its ban on electric scooter-sharing apps, unlike other major U.S. cities.

In her first year of office, Durkan proposed and implemented free Year-Round ORCA Passes for 15,000 High School and College Students. Seattle is now the largest U.S. city to provide free transit passes to high school students.

In March 2018, Durkan halted planning work on the Central City Connector streetcar project, which would link the South Lake Union and First Hill lines of the Seattle Streetcar system, due to cost overruns.

=== Police chief selection ===
Durkan's selection of a permanent chief of the Seattle Police Department in May 2018 ran into controversy after her list of finalists excluded interim chief Carmen Best, who had also served as deputy chief. After receiving criticism from community activists and the police officers' guild for choosing out-of-state finalists, Durkan defended her decision as the recommendation of a search committee. Durkan nominated Best as a finalist after another finalist withdrew to take a different position within the department, and the city council confirmed Best as police chief in August 2018.

=== Workplace conduct ===
In April 2019, it was reported that two of Durkan's staffers accused her of mistreatment, with one calling the working environment "toxic". One alleged that Durkan had "grabbed her face and forcibly turned her head" when the employee was making suggestions on how to handle the anniversary of the death of community leader Donnie Chin. The other described a hostile work environment where she was "set up to fail" despite having a good track record at previous jobs, and wanted $1.6 million in lost wages and emotional distress. Both employees were Asian women, a fact the second employee pointed out. Durkan's office denied both employees' allegations.

=== Covid response ===
Durkan was halfway through her term when the first recorded U.S. case of COVID-19 appeared in the Seattle area on January 19, 2020, and the first recorded U.S. death on February 29. COVID response was a central part of Durkan's remaining tenure. Under Durkan, as of March 2021, Seattle's response to the pandemic resulted in the lowest deaths per capita of any large U.S. metropolitan area. By March, Durkan, in collaboration with other area officials, implemented some of the first mask mandates in the U.S. They also set up four testing facilities in the city, which tested up to 6,000 people per day by mid-December 2020 and had completed 463,000 tests between June and December of that year. On March 17, 2020, Durkan signed an emergency order prohibiting the eviction of small businesses and nonprofits for 60 days or until the end of the emergency. The City Council and Durkan had already halted most residential evictions.

In May 2020, Durkan closed more than 20 miles of city streets to most vehicles in order to enable more socially distanced biking and walking. In May 2020, to help families in economic distress from Covid shutdowns, Durkan's administration sent $800 supermarket vouchers to households enrolled in subsidized child care and food programs, later extending the voucher program to other households. The administration opened additional shelter spaces with more distance between beds, provided supporting services at hotels commissioned to house homeless people, and gave $10,000 grants to 250 small businesses by May 24, 2020.

On August 9, 2021, Durkan in a joint announcement with Governor Jay Inslee and County Executive Dow Constantine announced a vaccine mandate for all government employees. Most employees ended up receiving the vaccine but there was strong initial pushback from the police and fire department. The police union said they were not consulted on the decision and took Durkan to court over the matter and were turned away by a federal judge. 170 firefighters and police officers were put on leave or separation proceedings at the mandate deadline.

On Sep 7, 2021, Durkan alongside county leaders announced a vaccine passport for the city of Seattle that would implement a digital verification system. The employee mandate and vaccine passport both received grassroots pushback. The mandates tasked short-staffed establishments with turning people away at the door. Businesses forced to act on the mandate were sometimes "gutted" by the drop off in their customer base. The city announced a two million fund to help businesses affected by the passport enforcement.

When Durkan left office in December 2021, about 90% of Seattle's eligible residents had received at least one dose of the covid shot and about 50% were had received both doses.

=== Homelessness in Seattle ===
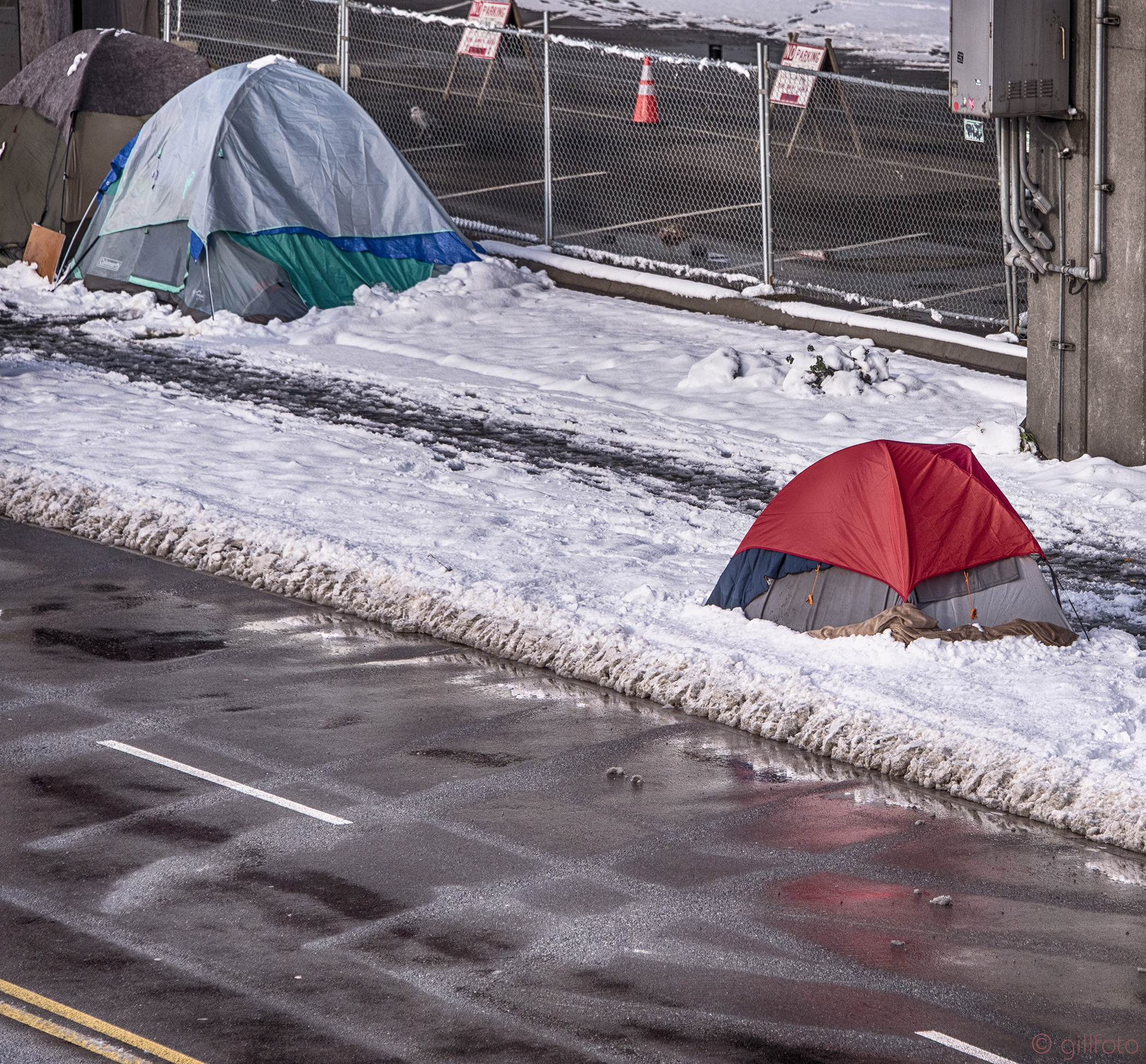
A homeless camp in Seattle, under the Alaskan Way Viaduct, 2019

During the COVID-19 pandemic, Durkan proposed one of the country's first eviction moratoriums for small businesses, nonprofits and residents. Due to these types of actions, Fortune magazine named her one of the "25 Best World Leaders" during the pandemic. But she continued sweeping homeless encampments, forcing homeless people to leave their campsite and find a different place to live. She said the encampments were cleared for the safety of both their residents and the community, and had "shootings, human trafficking and other violent crimes".

On May 15, Seattle City Council members Tammy Morales, Teresa Mosqueda and Kshama Sawant introduced an ordinance to ban sweeps of encampments during the COVID-19 pandemic. Durkan objected to the bill and the council did not reach an agreement. The bill was not expected to receive enough votes to pass, and Deputy Mayor Mike Fong told the council that Durkan would veto the bill because "Fundamentally we simply don't believe that this particular issue with regard to encampment removals is something that should be legislated."

Durkan has spent part of her tenure focusing on homelessness, creating 600 new units of supportive housing for people experiencing homelessness in 2020. In March 2019, she signed the Mandatory Housing Affordability bill into law, which implements affordable housing requirements and increases density in 27 Seattle neighborhoods. In July 2019, Durkan signed a bill and an executive order to increase the availability of backyard cottages.

=== Education ===
On November 19, 2017, Durkan signed an executive order to create the Seattle Promise College Tuition Program, which increases free access to college for Seattle public school students. Seattle residents voted in November 2018 to approve a tax to pay for the program. Durkan said that in order to increase the chances that students will succeed, the program also included support to help them decide what college to attend, as well as preparing them for student life, including what to study. Durkan used some of the Covid-19 relief funds from the American Rescue Plan to extend the program in 2021.

=== Handling of George Floyd protests and failed recall attempt ===
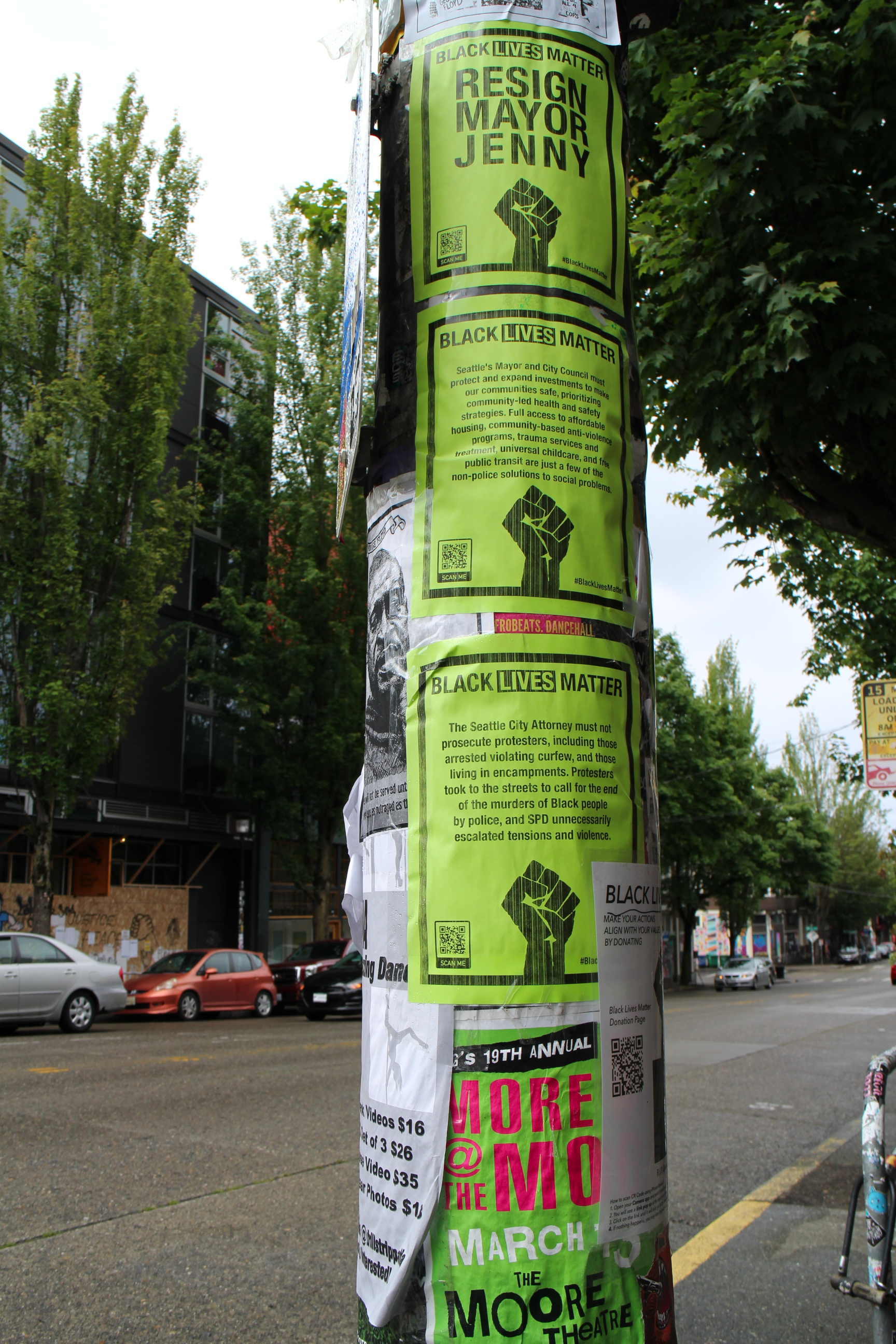
Flier inside CHOP calling on Durkan to resign

On June 1, 2020, during the George Floyd protests in Seattle in the Capitol Hill neighborhood, police in full riot gear barricaded the SPD's East Precinct building from protesters, using blast balls, flash bang grenades, and pepper spray against the crowd "at times with little apparent provocation". On June 2, Durkan spoke to a group of protesters for the first time after five days of demonstrations. Addressing criticism about "mourning badges" for fallen officers being used to cover up police officer badge numbers, Durkan said that the policy would be reviewed and that badge numbers should always be visible. She also said that the SPD policy of body cams not recording "lawful protests" would be reviewed. When asked whether she would stop the use of tear gas, Durkan said she didn't want to make a promise that she couldn't keep.

Police officers continued using tear gas to combat protesters, and on June 5 Durkan ordered a 30-day ban. Nevertheless, on June 6 the police used pepper spray and blast balls to disperse protesters outside the East Precinct, and on June 7 "unleashed a barrage of tear gas and flash bangs" on a crowd outside the precinct. On June 8, Seattle City Council members Morales, Mosqueda and Sawant called on Durkan to resign or be impeached "for gassing her own people". On June 9, hundreds of protesters occupied City Hall to demand her resignation, and on June 28 protesters marched to Durkan's home. On July 2, King County Superior Court judge Mary Roberts heard arguments for two separate petitions to recall Durkan, and on July 10 she ruled that one of the seven allegations had sufficient evidence to move forward, allowing petitioners to gather signatures for a recall election. Durkan's legal team asked Roberts to reconsider the ruling, arguing that the charge was the responsibility of Police Chief Carmen Best, but Roberts declined. On August 12 Durkan's legal team appealed the decision to the Washington State Supreme Court. The petitioners for the recall requested that the Supreme Court reconsider two of the charges that Roberts dismissed. 50,000 signatures of Seattle voters are needed for the recall to occur. Durkan estimated that her legal expenses to fight the recall would total $240,000.

In July 2020, a King County Superior Court judge ruled that her use of tear gas during the protests was sufficient for a petition to recall her as mayor to move forward, but the Washington State Supreme Court unanimously dismissed the attempt as "factually and legally insufficient". On December 7, 2020, Durkan announced that she would not seek reelection. The same day, Western Washington District Court judge Richard A. Jones ruled that the city of Seattle had violated the Consent Decree on four counts by using crowd control weapons during the George Floyd protests.

=== Missing records ===
Official text messages from Durkan from August 28, 2019, to June 25, 2020, were not retained and excluded from public records requests, a violation of the state Public Records Act. Communications from Fire Chief Harold Scoggins and then-police Chief Carmen Best in at least June 2020 are also missing, preventing the public from reviewing the decisions to use tear gas on protestors and residents of Capitol Hill.

On June 3, The Seattle Times filed a lawsuit against the City of Seattle over the missing text messages and the city's mishandling of reporters' public information requests. Durkan's office claimed the missing texts were due to an "unknown technology issue", but her staff knew the texts were missing because they were deliberately set to automatically delete. The whistleblowers who sought to comply with the law sued the city for retaliation and constructive dismissal.

In 2023, the City of Seattle paid $600,000 to settle a lawsuit after a federal judge found that Durkan, Best, and Scoggins had intentionally destroyed evidence by deleting text messages related to their handling of protests and the CHOP.

== Personal life ==
Durkan is a lesbian. She and her partner, Dana Garvey, have two sons. Garvey was a senior executive at McCaw Cellular/AT&T, one of the largest cellular communication firms in the United States. Garvey has since launched her own start-up, D. Garvey Corp, that employed more than 255 people in the "development and construction of large-scale wireless networks" before starting IconAlytics, a company that authenticates art.

Durkan and Garvey are unmarried and not registered as a domestic couple. Because of this, Durkan did not have to disclose Garvey's financial records during her mayoral campaign.

== See also ==
- List of mayors of the 50 largest cities in the United States
- List of United States political families

Legal offices
| Preceded by John McKay | U.S. Attorney for the Western District of Washington; 2009–2014 | Succeeded by Annette Hayes; Acting |
Political offices
| Preceded by Tim Burgess | Mayor of Seattle; 2017–2022 | Succeeded by Bruce Harrell |
