= Tim Burgess (politician) =

American politician

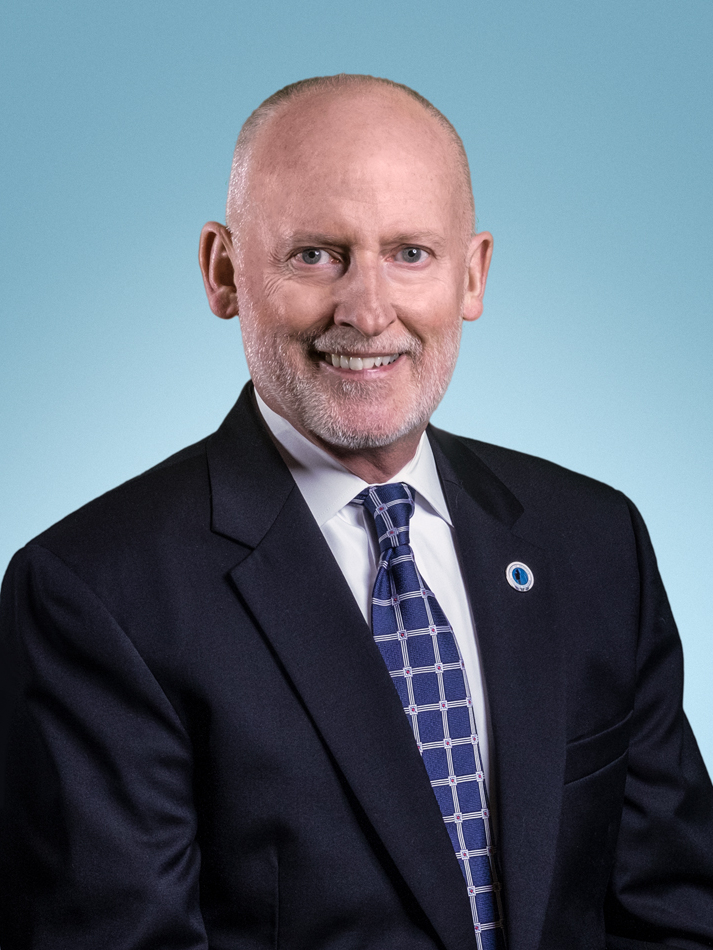

55th Mayor of Seattle
- In office September 18, 2017 – November 28, 2017
- Preceded by: Bruce Harrell
- Succeeded by: Jenny Durkan

Member of the Seattle City Council
- In office January 1, 2008 – September 18, 2017
- Preceded by: David Della
- Succeeded by: Kirsten Harris-Talley
- Constituency: At large
- In office January 1, 2008 – November 28, 2017

President of the Seattle City Council
- In office January 3, 2014 – January 3, 2016
- Preceded by: Sally J. Clark
- Succeeded by: Bruce Harrell

Personal details
- Born: March 18, 1949 (age 77) Seattle, Washington, U.S.
- Party: Democratic Party
- Spouse: Joleen Burgess
- Children: 3
- Education: University of Washington (BA)
- Occupation: Radio journalist, police officer

Timothy L. Burgess (born March 18, 1949) is an American journalist and politician from Seattle, Washington. He was a member of the Seattle City Council from 2008 to 2017, and served as Mayor of Seattle for 71 days in late 2017 after the previous mayor resigned. Prior to his political career, Burgess was a radio journalist and Seattle Police Department (SPD) officer.

Burgess was appointed mayor by the city council on September 18, 2017, to serve the remaining term of Ed Murray, who resigned amid a sexual abuse scandal. Burgess replaced the acting mayor, Council President Bruce Harrell, and served as mayor until the 2017 mayoral election results were certified on November 28.

Burgess was first elected to the city council in November 2007 with 64% of the vote. He was re-elected with 83% of the vote to a second four-year term in November 2011. He was elected again in 2015 with 54% of the vote.

Burgess chaired the City Council's Education and Governance Committee and was vice-chair of the Planning, Land Use and Sustainability Committee. He was elected Council President by his colleagues for 2014–2015 and was also co-chair of the City's Family and Education Levy Oversight Committee. Prior to his election to the City Council, Burgess chaired his neighborhood community council and served 12 years on Seattle's Ethics and Elections Commission.

== Early life and career ==
Burgess was born to a working class, Christian family in Seattle's Capitol Hill neighborhood, the youngest of three brothers. He described his family as "very poor", and their home was foreclosed when Burgess was 12 years old, moving into a rented home in Eastlake. Burgess graduated from Lincoln High School in Wallingford in 1967 and attended classes at North Seattle Community College before transferring to the University of Washington. He volunteered for Republican presidential candidate Barry Goldwater during his youth, and was part of his middle school's Republican club.

Burgess joined radio station KJR in the news department while in college, covering issues related to the Seattle Police Department, including corruption trials in county courts. He worked alongside future councilmember and mayor Norm Rice. After the election of mayor Wes Uhlman in 1970, Burgess left radio journalism and joined the Seattle Police Department as a police officer, seeking to be part of Uhlman's plans for reform. He dropped out of the University of Washington, 12 credits short of a bachelor's degree in political science, due to a shift change. Burgess patrolled in the High Point neighborhood of West Seattle for two years, in what he described as an "eye-opening" experience seeing "the effects of violence, injustice, [and] poverty". He moved to the police department's public relations arm in 1974, eventually serving as the press aide to Police Chief Robert Hanson from 1974 to 1978. While with the police department, Burgess also served as a burglary detective.

Burgess left the police department in 1978 for World Concern, a Seattle-based Christian humanitarian organization working on anti-poverty initiatives, to work as a communications and public relations manager. In 1985, Burgess started an advertising agency in Seattle, Burgess & Associates (later, The Domain Group), which he ran until selling the agency to Merkle in 2005. The company had an annual revenue of $70 million and more than 200 employees at the time of its sale.

== Political career ==
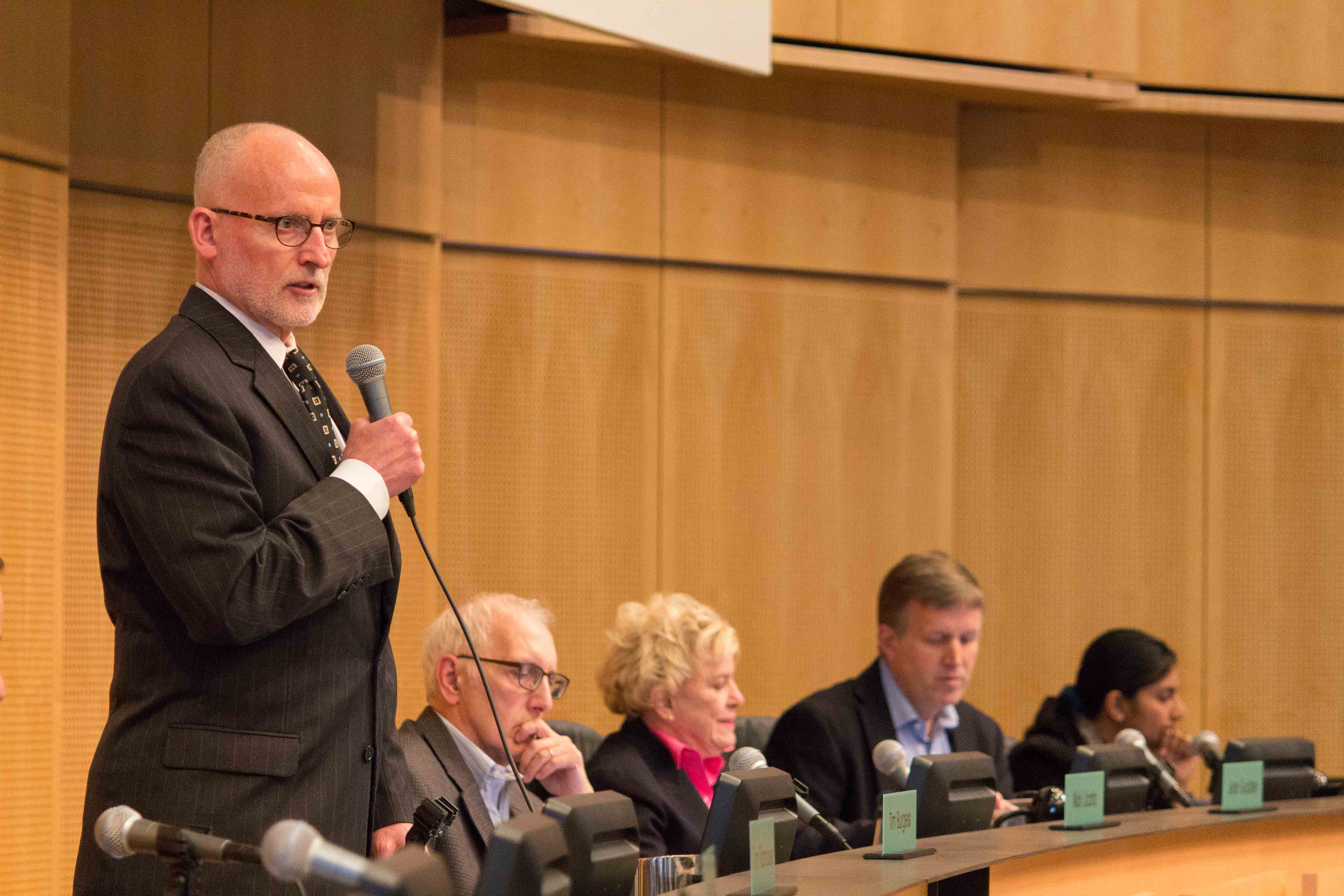
Councilman Burgess in 2015

Burgess chaired the Queen Anne Community Council in the 1990s and served on the Seattle Ethics and Elections Commission from 1989 to 2001, chairing the commission for five years. Burgess publicly criticized city councilmembers for their ties to organized crime and campaign-finance violations during the Strippergate scandal of 2003, taking a leading role in calling for accountability in his position as former ethics commissioner.

Burgess began considering a run for the Seattle City Council in late 2006, while on a bike trip in Italy during his retirement. He announced his candidacy in January 2007, intending to run against one-term incumbent David Della. Burgess was the only challenger to Della, advancing automatically to the November general election. Burgess was criticized by Della for his advertisement agency's work for a conservative Christian group that opposes abortion and gay marriage, despite Burgess's personal beliefs. Burgess received the endorsement of The Seattle Times and The Stranger, along with several state and local politicians, and ultimately won in the election with 64 percent of votes. The race for Position 8 was the most expensive in city council history, with Burgess raising $64,000 of his $293,000 using his own money.

Burgess was sworn in as a new councilmember in January 2008 and was elected to chair the Public Safety, Human Services and Education Committee.

Burgess was re-elected by 84 percent of voters in the November 2011 election, defeating architect David Schraer.

Burgess ran for mayor in the 2013 mayoral election, looking to unseat incumbent Mike McGinn, but dropped out before the primary filing deadline. He endorsed Ed Murray, who later was elected mayor. Burgess was named Council President from 2014 to 2016. He was elected to a third term in 2015, defeating Jon Grant with over 54 percent of votes. Burgess announced that he would not seek re-election in 2017, as he was one of the most senior councilmembers and sought to step aside and "move on".

After the resignation of Mayor Ed Murray on September 13, 2017, Burgess was named as a leading candidate to become interim mayor until November. Council President and acting mayor Bruce Harrell declined to continue the term, and Burgess was elected mayor by the Seattle City Council in a 5–1 vote on September 18, 2017, with council member Kshama Sawant casting the sole opposing vote. His 71-day term as mayor, which he described as "accidental", included the signing of the 2018 budget. After the certification of the 2017 mayoral election results on November 28, 2017, Jenny Durkan became mayor.

Burgess rejoined the city government in 2022 as the Director of Strategic Initiatives under mayor Bruce Harrell. He was named deputy mayor in August 2023 following the resignation of Monisha Harrell.

== Personal life ==
Burgess married his wife Joleen, a former editor at the Seattle Post-Intelligencer, in 1979. They have three daughters and live on Queen Anne Hill in Seattle.

Burgess is a Christian and attends church at a Presbyterian church on Queen Anne Hill on a weekly basis. He described his faith in 2012 to The Stranger as being "absolutely anchored to forgiveness and grace". He identified as a Republican early in his life, but later became a Democrat over his personal values.
