= Michael Harris (producer) =

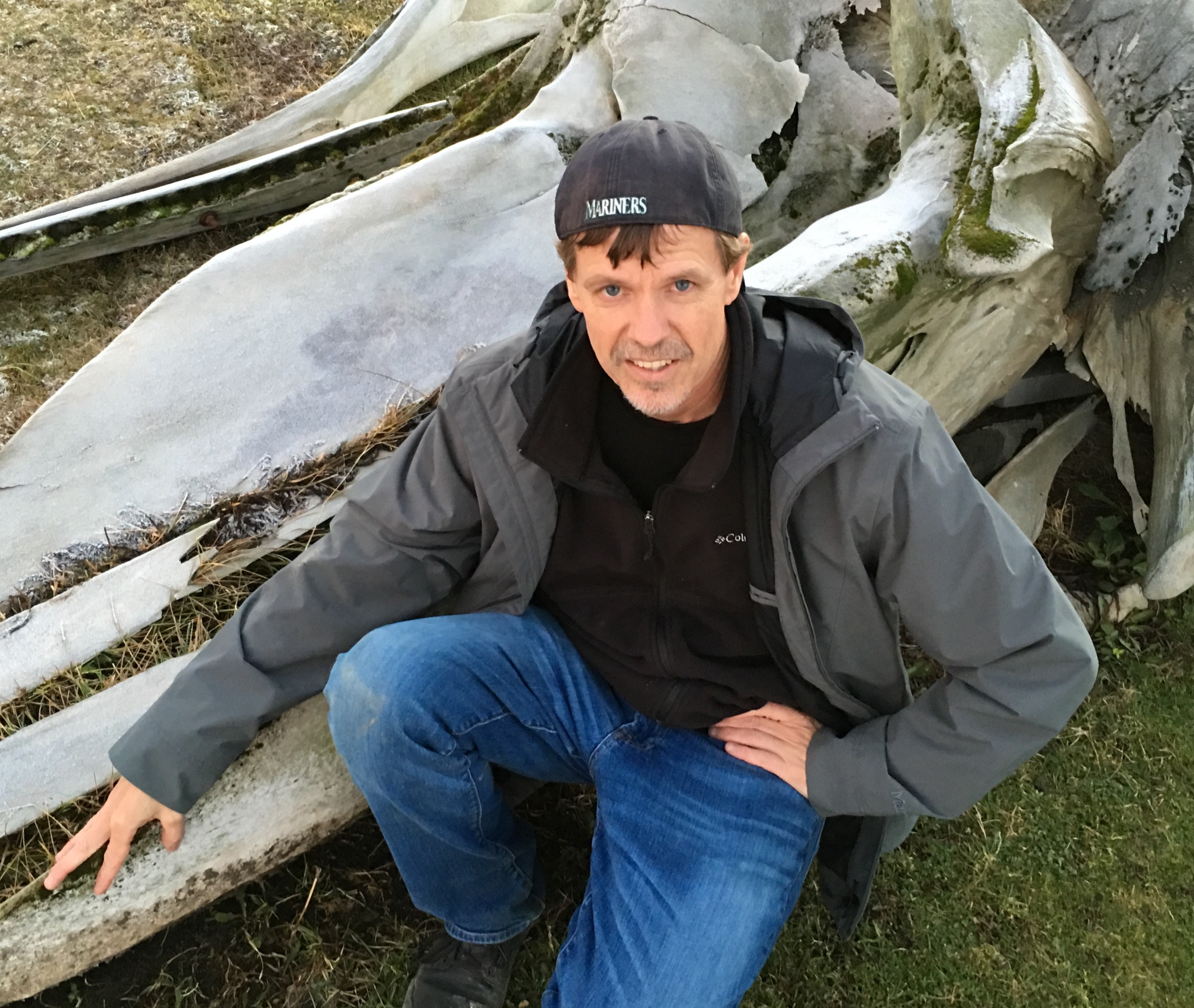
- Harris with right whale skeleton in Tierra del Fuego, Argentina.
- Born: Dayton, Ohio, United States
- Education: BS 1997 University of Washington, Seattle
- Website: http://www.babywildfilms.com

Michael Harris is an American television producer, photojournalist and filmmaker. He has been a contributing producer for ABC News, NBC News, VH1 and MTV. Harris has also produced original content for Yahoo! each week on ABC World News Now. He has covered stories for World News Tonight and Good Morning America. He has also contributed to 20/20 and Nightline. Harris is a 12-time regional Emmy Award-winner, with over 46 nominations. In 2018, he received a News & Documentary Emmy Award as Editorial Producer for the 20/20 special documentary presentation, "Heartbreak & Heroes," on the October 2017 mass shooting in Las Vegas. Harris also received a 2018 Christopher Award as part of the producing team of the ABC News 20/20 special, "Wonder Boy."

Harris is also a marine conservationist, collaborating from 1997 and 2017 with Orca Conservancy, a Seattle-based organization that works to protect killer whales and their habitats. Between 2011 and 2016, Harris consulted the Pacific Whale Watch Association as its executive director.

== Early life ==
Harris is the seventh of 10 children of Barbara Rettig, who worked for CBS Television and Chris Harris, who was the first player from England to compete in the American NBA.

== Career ==
Harris' first television position was as Associate Producer for the Northwest Bureau of the MacNeil-Lehrer NewsHour (PBS), and he was Seattle Bureau Chief for MTV News. He held staff and contract positions at KCTS Television (PBS Seattle), KING Television (NBC Seattle) and KOMO Television (ABC Seattle). Harris was writer/editor for 22 episodes of Popular Science With Dean Stockwell (Discovery Channel/The Learning Channel).

Beginning in 2002, Harris was contracted by ABC News as an on-camera wildlife specialist and producer/photojournalist. Between 2005 and 2011, he produced 27 HDTV "Weekend Windows" for ABC News Good Morning America. In 2010, Harris was the first US network television news producer to secure permission to shoot on "The Forbidden Island" of Niʻihau in Hawai'i. Harris has produced and conducted interviews for Viacom's VH1 and MTV, for pop-culture programs "The Week in Rock," "100 Most Shocking Moments in Rock," "100 Greatest One-Hit Wonders," "The Great Debate" and "Black to the Future."

Harris has produced wildlife documentaries. His half-hour film in 2002 entitled "iSi Se Puede! Connecting Farmworker Communities" won a Northwest Regional Emmy for "Outstanding Public Affairs Special" and a nomination for "Outstanding Photography, Program Length." Harris' feature-length documentary in 2008 called "The 3rd Trustee: Native Alaska & The Big Spill" won an Emmy Award for "Outstanding On-Air Host or Moderator" for Billy Frank Jr and received nominations for "Outstanding Documentary" and "Outstanding Photography." Harris was a co-recipient with the Berman Environmental Law Clinic at the University of Washington for a "National Clinical Legal Association Award of Excellence in a Public Interest Case or Project" for their efforts to provide legal assistance and help in photo-documenting the successful campaign of 187 tribes in Native Alaska to push the State and federal government to call on Exxon to fulfill its legal obligations toward the cleanup of Prince William Sound. That special became "Native Alaska & The Big Spill," the first episode of a television series entitled, THIS IS INDIAN COUNTRY With Billy Frank Jr. In 2009, Harris won an Emmy for "Dairyman Blues," his short investigative documentary on factory dairy farms in Eastern Washington, in the category of "Outstanding Advanced Media — News Programming."

== Conservation ==
Harris has led a number of conservation efforts. As a "climate correspondent" for a coalition of environmental groups called the Arctic Refuge Defense Campaign, he hit the campaign trail for the 2020 Democratic presidential primaries, getting major candidates on record on climate policy and specifically fossil fuel development in the Arctic National Wildlife Refuge in Alaska. As President and member of the Board of Directors of Orca Conservancy, a Seattle-based 501(c)(3) non-profit organization, Harris helped lead a number of high-profile killer whale rescues. The group was central in saving a stranded orca at Dungeness Spit, Washington State in January 2002 and a month later initiated a campaign to save the orphaned orca Springer, the first successful rescue and translocation of a wild orca back to its family. Orca Conservancy was also a petitioner in an historic U.S. District Court case that led in 2005 to the first federal protection for the Southern Resident Community of orcas in Puget Sound under the Endangered Species Act.

Harris served as Northwest Spokesperson for the Free Willy-Keiko Foundationt.
