= Seattle grand jury resisters =

Four American anarchists imprisoned for refusing to testify in 2012

The Seattle grand jury resisters are a group of four anarchists who were imprisoned in 2012 for refusing to testify before a grand jury. The grand jury was investigating an incident during the 2012 May Day protests in Seattle, in which a courthouse was vandalized. None of the four were charged with any crime; however, they were held in prison for civil contempt of court in an attempt to force them to testify. The four were later released.

== Background ==
During the Seattle May Day rallies of May 1, 2012, a group of approximately 75 black bloc protesters broke away from the main group and vandalized a number of stores, as well as the William Kenzo Nakamura United States Courthouse. About eight arrests were made that day, mostly for unrelated incidents.

In late July, a number of houses in Portland, Olympia and Seattle were raided by the FBI. Anarchist literature, black clothing, computers and cellphones were seized. Dennison Williams, 33, and Leah-Lynn Plante, 24 were subpoenaed to testify before a grand jury. Dennison Williams issued a statement on behalf of them both, stating that they would not answer any questions except for their name and address.

== Imprisonment and release ==
The Seattle grand jury originally issued subpoenas for Leah-Lynn Plante and two others (Matthew Duran and Katherine "KteeO" Olejnik) in July, when the FBI and the Joint Terrorist Task Force broke down the door to Plante's home with warrants seeking computers, phones, black clothing and "anarchist" and antigovernment literature.

Plante from Portland, Oregon was jailed on October 10, 2012 for civil contempt for failing to testify before a federal grand jury about the events of May 1, 2012. Plante was not charged with a crime. Plante was released seven days later. Duran and Olejnik, who had also been jailed for a refusal to testify, were not released. The three were held at the Federal Detention Center, SeaTac near Seattle-Tacoma International Airport.

On February 28, 2013, Duran and Olejnik were released, having spent five months in prison, some of it in solitary confinement. U.S. District Judge Richard A. Jones ordered the pair's release after determining that continued detention would be useless, as they had made it clear that they would not under any circumstances testify before the grand jury.

The fourth and last grand jury resister, Maddie Pfeiffer, was released on April 11, 2013, by order of Judge Jones.
