= Nikkita Oliver =

American civil rights activist, lawyer and educator

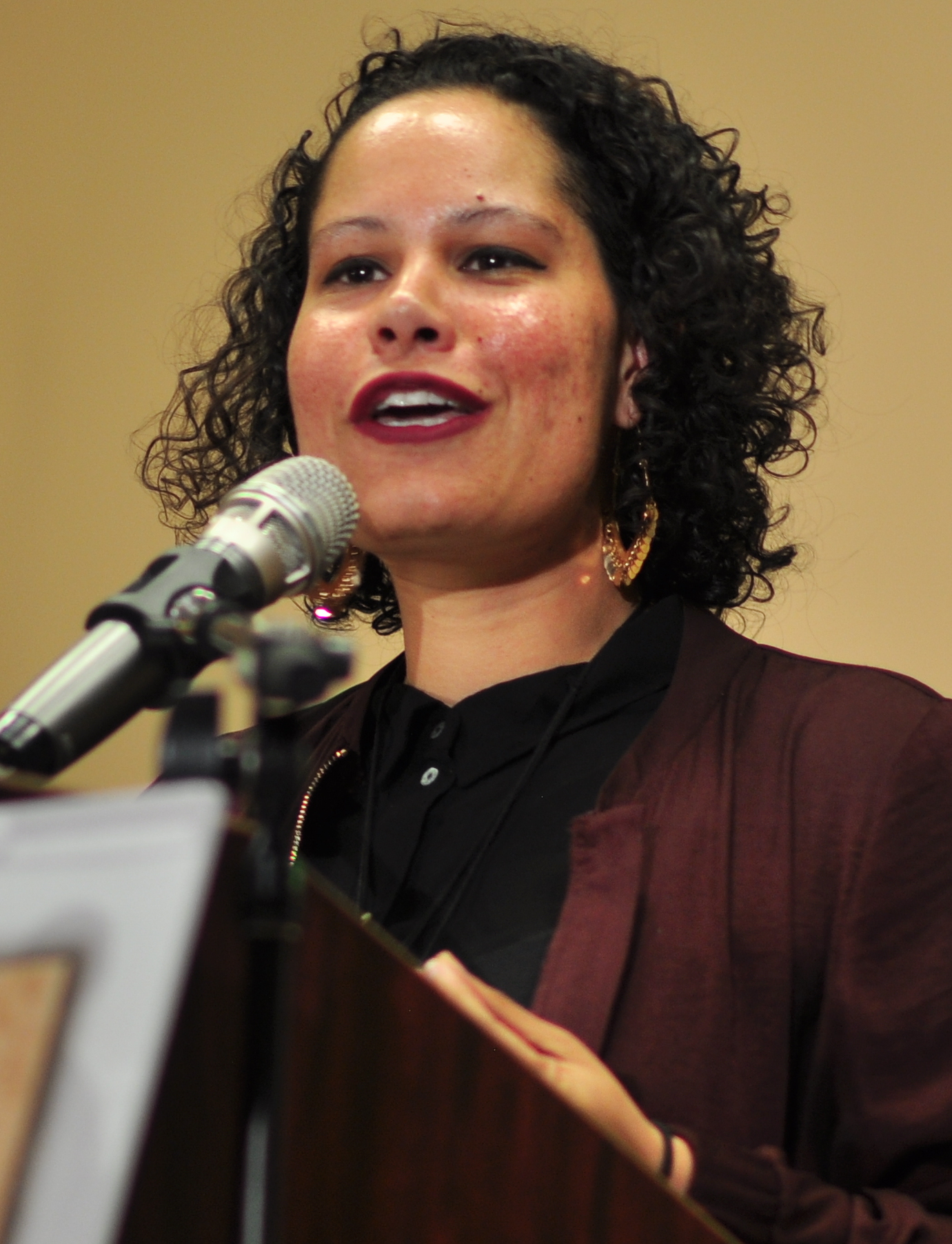
- Oliver in 2018
- Born: Indianapolis, Indiana, U.S.
- Education: Seattle Pacific University (BA); University of Washington (JD, MS)
- Occupations: Lawyer; activist; educator; poet

Nikkita R. Oliver is an American lawyer, non-profit administrator, educator, poet, and politician. They were a candidate for mayor of Seattle in the 2017 mayoral election, but finished third in the primary with 17% of the vote. Oliver was defeated again in an at-large Seattle City Council race in 2021.

Oliver was a leader in the Black Lives Matter, civil rights, and criminal justice reform movements in Seattle, before relocating to Detroit in 2022.

== Early life and education ==
Oliver was born in Indianapolis to a white mother and black father.

Oliver attended Seattle Pacific University and earned a degree in sociology in 2008. At Seattle Pacific, Oliver became involved with student government and led a racial justice campaign called "Catalyst". Oliver also became involved with the local Black Lives Matter organization. Oliver earned a Juris Doctor from the University of Washington School of Law in 2015 and Master of Education from the University of Washington College of Education in 2016.

== Career ==
Oliver worked for the American Civil Liberties Union, as an intervention specialist, and as a chaplain at the Youth Detention Center at the Judge Patricia H. Clark Children and Family Justice Center. In 2015, Oliver was awarded the Artist Human Rights Leader Award by the City of Seattle's Human Rights Commission.

Oliver worked for several organizations that opposed homosexuality and maintained policies against hiring homosexuals. This included Seattle's Union Gospel Mission, which argued in federal court that its "anti-gay hiring policy is religious freedom at work". Oliver was also employed at Seattle Pacific University, which has a policy against hiring homosexuals.

=== 2017 mayoral campaign ===
External videos
- Seattle’s Next Mayor? Activist, Attorney Nikkita Oliver, PBS, April 4, 2017 retrieved June 28, 2020

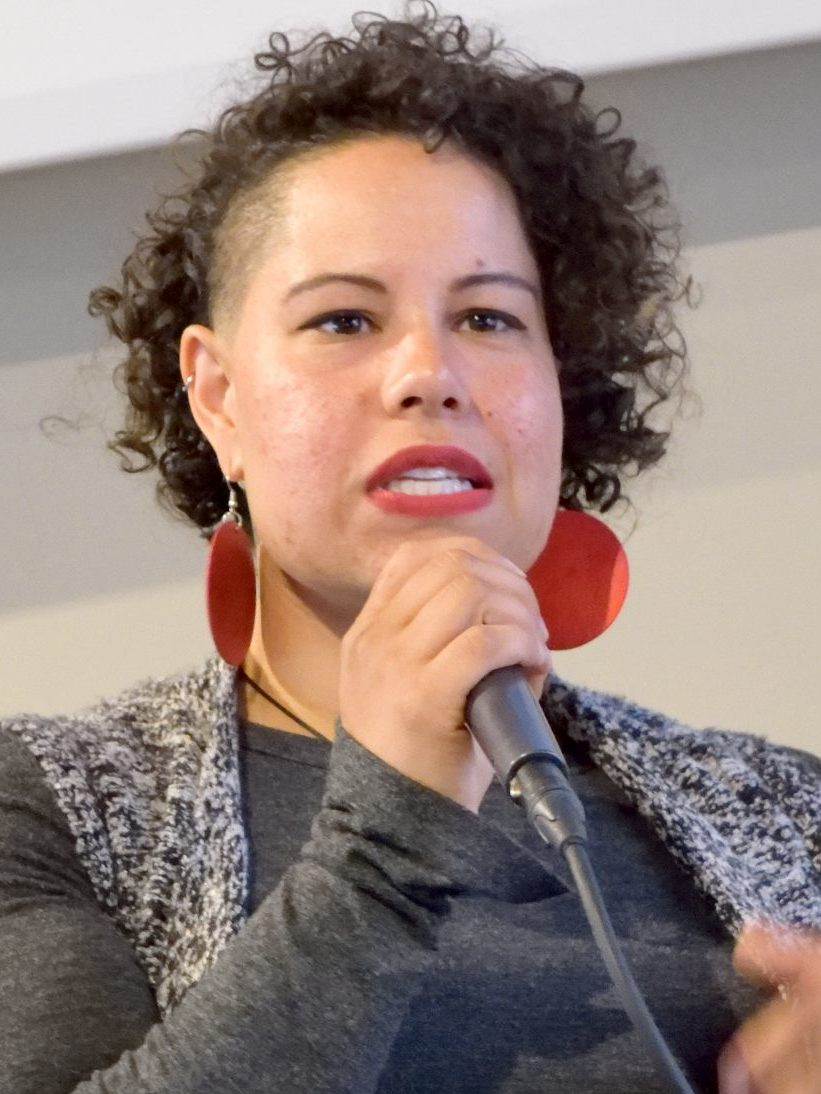
Oliver speaking during their 2017 mayoral campaign

Oliver declared their candidacy for mayor of Seattle in March 2017, expecting to run against incumbent mayor Ed Murray, though he resigned due to multiple allegations of sexual assault before the election. Oliver announced they would be representing the "Peoples Party of Seattle", a collection of community and civic leaders, lawyers, artists, activists and teachers that began organizing after the 2016 presidential election. At the time, Oliver was a part-time teacher at Washington Middle School and Franklin Middle School and provided mostly pro-bono services as an attorney. Oliver also worked for Creative Justice, an arts-based alternative to incarceration. Oliver's campaign focused on a "radical rethinking of criminal justice investments, revisiting the city’s housing proposals to extract more from developers for affordable housing; slowing gentrification, and examining an even higher minimum wage than the recent landmark achievement of $15 an hour." Oliver also brought attention to issues like homelessness, institutional racism, and poverty.

Oliver ran on the Seattle People's Party ballot line, which they intended to grow into a "community-centered, grassroots political party". The SPP is not formally affiliated with the Movement for a People's Party.

=== Criminal justice reform efforts ===
Oliver has worked as an organizer for Seattle's No Youth Jail and Black Lives Matter movements. They work as co-director of Creative Justice Northwest, a nonprofit organization that offers programs to youth most impacted by the school-to-prison pipeline. Following the murder of George Floyd in Minneapolis, Minnesota, Oliver helped organize and spoke at numerous protests in Seattle. During a closed-door meeting with Mayor Jenny Durkan, Police Chief Carmen Best, and other community leaders, Oliver live-streamed the discussion. Oliver has been an advocate for de-funding the police and civic investment in community-based public health and public safety strategies.

Oliver has also spoken about outside spending on local political campaigns. In 2017, Oliver was named one of Seattle's Most Influential Seattlelites by Seattle Magazine. Oliver co-drafted a resolution for Seattle's divestment from the Dakota Access Pipeline in 2017.

In January 2020, Oliver was featured as the keynote speaker for the Dr. Martin Luther King Jr. Day celebration at Edmonds Community College. They have been featured as a guest lecturer and speaker at the University of Michigan, Reed College, the Stanley Ann Dunham Scholarship Fund, KTCS 9, Pod Save the People, and Town Hall Seattle.

=== 2021 City Council campaign ===
In March 2021, Oliver declared their candidacy for Seattle City Council position 9, but was defeated.

=== Detroit Justice Center ===
In July 2022, the Detroit Justice Center announced that Oliver had joined the organization as an Associate Executive Director of Programs & Strategy, and would be relocating to Detroit. However, Oliver and DJC quickly parted ways.

== Personal life ==
Oliver identifies as queer and uses they/them pronouns. They are genderfluid.
