= John Okamoto =

American politician

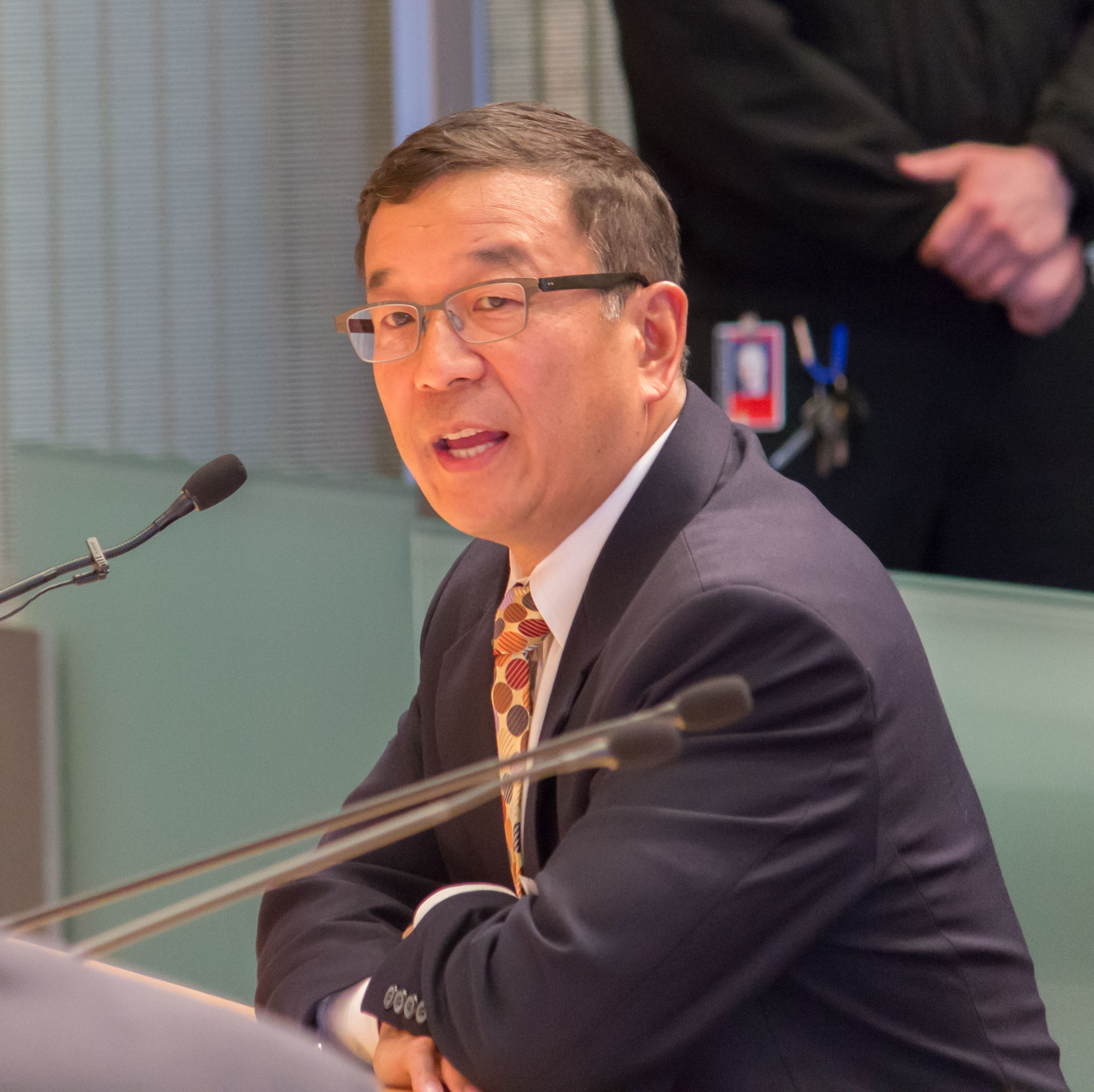

Member of the Seattle City Council At-large Position 9
- In office April 27, 2015 – November 24, 2015
- Preceded by: Sally J. Clark
- Succeeded by: Lorena González

Personal details
- Born: Seattle, Washington, California
- Party: Democratic
- Spouse: Sharon Okamoto
- Children: Charissa and Shawna
- Education: University of Washington (BA, MPA)

John Okamoto is an American politician and bureaucrat from Seattle, Washington. He was appointed to the District 8 seat on the Seattle City Council in April 2015.

== Early life and education ==
Okamoto was born and raised in Seattle, earning his bachelor's degree in psychology and his master's in public administration from the University of Washington. In 1988, he attended Harvard University's John F. Kennedy School of Government.

== Career ==
Okamoto was the director of Seattle's Human Resources Department from 1991 to 1994, then the director of Engineering from 1994 to 1996. From 1996 to 2003, Okamoto led the Assistant Secretary for the Washington State Department of Transportation.

Okamoto then became the Chief Administrative Officer for the Port of Seattle from 2003 to 2008. During his tenure, he was not directly named in a scathing audit performed by the Port related to construction practices, but was directly named in a separate report on sexually explicit and racist e-mails sent by Port police. The report stated there "was a lack of adequate oversight by senior members of the Port’s executive staff," which included Okamoto.

Okamoto left the Port in 2008 to become executive director of the Washington Education Association, and stayed in that position until 2014. From 2014 to 2015, he was the Interim Director of the Seattle Human Services Department.

== Seattle City Council ==
=== Appointment ===
In April 2015, City Councilmember Sally J. Clark announced that she would resign her seat to take a job at the University of Washington. The 8-month vacancy would be filled on a "caretaker" capacity, and Okamoto applied for the position. He was one of eight finalist, which included former councilmember Jan Drago and activist Sharon Maeda, that the full council to vote on by simple majority.

Before the vote, each council member was allowed time to speak. Councilmember Kshama Sawant vehemently argued against Okamoto, citing The Stranger (newspaper) articles about the audits during his time at the Port of Seattle. After two rounds of voting, Okamoto was appointed to the At-large seat on a vote of 5 to 3.

Okamoto stated he would work with all the council members, but in response to Sawant's criticism, he said, "It’s disappointing. Those charges are false." He would call the appointment process "intense" due to the public scrutiny.

=== Tenure ===
Okamoto chaired the Housing Affordability, Human Services, and Economic Resiliency Committee and was a member of the Education and Governance, Planning, Land Use and Sustainability, and Select Committee on Housing Affordability committees. While in office, Okamoto sponsored a resolution to “disaggregate” U.S. Census data from aid provided by the city.

Okamoto did not seek a full-term election in 2016.

== Personal life ==
Okamoto is married to his wife, Sharon, and they have two daughters, Charissa and Shawna.
