= 2021 Seattle City Council 3rd district recall election =

- December 7, 2021
- Turnout: 52.84%

Results
Choice	Votes	%
Yes	20,346	49.62%
No	20,656	50.38%
Valid votes	41,002	99.92%
Invalid or blank votes	31	0.08%
Total votes	41,033	100.00%
Registered voters/turnout	77,652	52.84%
- Precinct results No: 50–60% 60–70% 70–80% 80–90% 90–100% Yes: 50–60% 60–70% 70–80% 80–90% 90–100%
City Councilor before election
Kshama Sawant
Socialist Alternative
City Councilor after election
Kshama Sawant
Socialist Alternative

The 2021 Seattle City Council 3rd district recall election was held on December 7, 2021. Kshama Sawant, a member of the Seattle City Council from the 3rd district, defeated an attempt to recall her. This was the first recall election held in Seattle since the one held against Mayor Wesley C. Uhlman in 1975, and the first for a city councilor in the city's history.

Ernie Lou filed a complaint against Sawant on August 18, 2020, to the King County Elections Office to start the recall campaign against her. The complaint against Sawant included allegations that she violated the law through the use of city resources for the promotion of a ballot initiative, the delegation of employment decisions to Socialist Alternative, and encouraging the creation of the Capitol Hill Occupied Protest.

Sawant filed a lawsuit against the recall attempt, but the Judge Jim Rogers certified four of the six complaints, and the Washington Supreme Court certified three of those four on appeal. Sawant and her supporters attempted to have the recall held in November by collecting recall signatures themselves. The recall campaign submitted its signatures and were certified on September 30, 2021. The recall lost with 20,656 voting against and 20,346 voting in favor.

== Background ==
An attempt was made to conduct a recall election against Richard Conlin, a member of the Seattle City Council from the 2nd position, in 2011. The recall campaign alleged that Conlin had violated the law to advance the construction of the State Route 99 tunnel when he signed a draft environmental statement, colluded with Pete Holmes, the Seattle City Attorney, to bring a lawsuit to block a referendum on the tunnel, and by him delaying a referendum to prohibit city streets from being used to construct the tunnel. Judge Carol Schapira ruled that there was not enough evidence to prove that Conlin had violated the law although she stated that he had done so for political reasons.

Kshama Sawant, a member of Socialist Alternative, defeated Conlin in the 2013 election becoming the first socialist elected in Seattle since Anna Louise Strong. During the campaign she had raised and spent $161,823.10 against Conlin who had raised and spent $241,986.34. Sawant defeated Pamela Banks in the 2015 election after raising and spending $480,258.24 against Banks who had raised and spent $388,544.75. She defeated Egan Orion in the 2019 election after raising and spending $587,141.43 against Orion who had raised and spent $403,881.92.

== Campaign ==
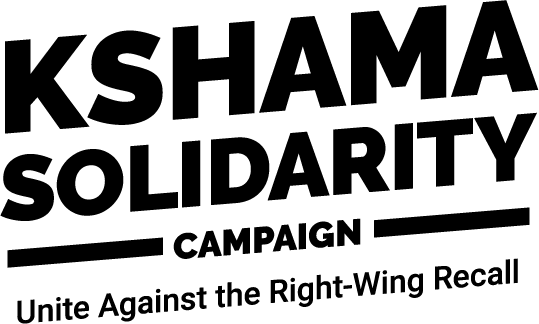
Campaign logo of Kshama Solidarity

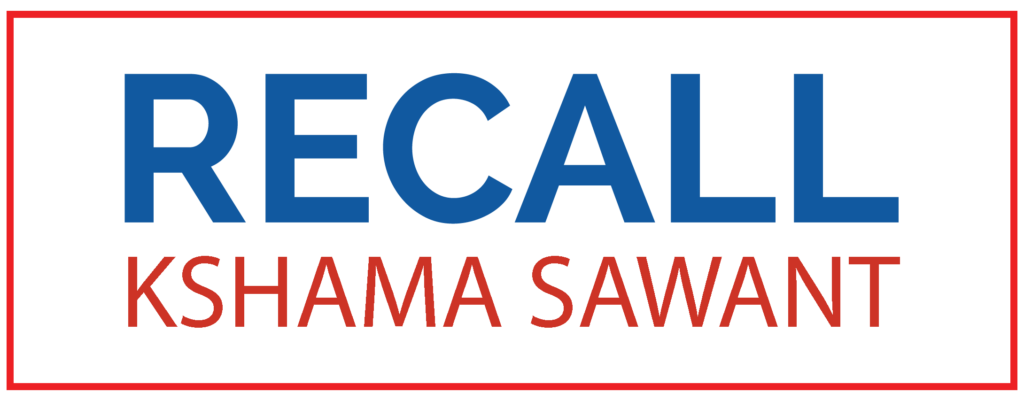
Campaign logo of Recall Kshama Sawant

A complaint by Ernie Lou requesting for the King County Elections Office to begin an effort to recall Sawant was made on August 18, 2020. Lou alleged that Sawant had violated the law through the misuse of city resources and her authority by opening Seattle City Hall to protesters. The recall campaign also alleged that Sawant had broken the law by using city resources to promote a ballot initiative, delegated employment decisions to Socialist Alternative, and encouraged the creation of the Capitol Hill Occupied Protest. Orion, who had run against Sawant in 2019, gave the recall campaign a donor list containing the names of around 2,500 people. Henry Bridger II was the campaign manager of the recall campaign.

Sawant filed a lawsuit against the recall effort and the Seattle city council voted seven to one in favor of funding Sawant's legal defense while the recall campaign was represented by John McKay, a former United States Attorney during the presidency of George W. Bush. However, Judge Jim Rogers certified four of the six complaints made by the recall campaign. She appealed the decision to the Washington Supreme Court, but the court ruled unanimously in favor of the recall campaign, but ruled that one of the four complaints certified by Rogers was not legal or factual.

The recall campaign started the process in April 2021 in which they were given 180 days to collect 10,739 signatures for the recall. Supporters of Sawant started collecting signatures in support of a recall on July 9, in order to have the election held in November with more turnout rather than in a special election and their signatures were submitted later in July. Sawant stated that the recall campaign knew "that Black people, working class people and young people typically vote in dramatically lower numbers in special elections". The recall campaign accused Sawant of attempting to suppress the will of voters through her collection of recall signatures and filed a complaint against her to King County Elections. During the campaign the Kshama Solidarity Campaign attempted to register 2,000 voters.

A Better Seattle, a political action committee (PAC) that supported the recall, was formed with Phillip Lloyd as its treasurer. Lloyd had served as the treasurer for PACs which had supported Bruce Harrell and Ann Davison. The Washington State Public Disclosure Commission later removed the maximum $1,000 contribution limit for A Better Seattle. The average donation to A Better Seattle was over $750, to Recall Sawant was $149.46, and to the Kshama Solidarity Fund was $88.89. The majority of donations to A Better Seattle were the maximum allowed while 4.4% of the donations to Recall Sawant and around 2% of the donations to the Kshama Solidarity Fund were the maximum allowed.

The recall campaign submitted 16,234 signatures in September. Over 11,000 of the signatures were certified on September 30, and a recall was ordered to be held on December 7. This was the first recall election held in Seattle since the one held against Mayor Wesley C. Uhlman in 1975. This was the first recall election for a city councilor in Seattle's history. King County Elections sent mail-in ballots to over 76,000 voters on November 17.

The recall attempt lost with 20,656 voting against, worth 50.38%, and 20,346 voting in favor, worth 49.62%. If the recall was successful, a replacement for Sawant would have been selected by the Seattle City Council within twenty days to serve until the 2022 election. The turnout in the recall election was similar to the turnout in the regular election.

== Campaign finance ==
Candidate	Campaign committee				
Candidate	Raised	Spent	COH	Loans and Debts	Balance
A Better Seattle	$151,825.00	$6,104.30	$145,720.70	$157,520.00	-$11,799.30
Kshama Solidarity Campaign	$941,477.68	$917,352.70	$24,124.98	$20,743.33	$3,381.65
Recall Sawant	$782,171.73	$734,451.67	$47,720.06	$35,681.13	$12,038.93

== Endorsements ==
No vote endorsements

State officials

- Julia Salazar, member of the New York State Senate from the 18th district
- Rebecca Saldaña, member of the Washington State Senate from the 37th district

Local officials

- Larry Gossett, former member of the King County Council from the 2nd district
- Mike O'Brien, former member of the Seattle City Council from the 6th district
- Girmay Zahilay, member of the King County Council from the 2nd district

Individuals

- Noam Chomsky, philosopher
- Aaron Dixon, member of the Black Panther Party

Political parties

- Freedom Socialist Party
- Socialist Alternative

Organizations

- Seattle Democratic Socialists of America
Yes vote endorsements

Local officials

- Jan Drago, former member of the Seattle City Council from the 4th district
- Judy Nicastro, former member of the Seattle City Council

Newspapers

- The Seattle Times

== Results ==
2021 Seattle City Council 3rd district recall election
Choice	Votes	%
No on recall	20,656	50.38
Yes on recall	20,346	49.62
Blank and invalid votes	31	–
Total votes	41,033	100
Registered voters and turnout	77,652	52.84%
