= Climate change in New Mexico =

Climate change in the US state of New Mexico

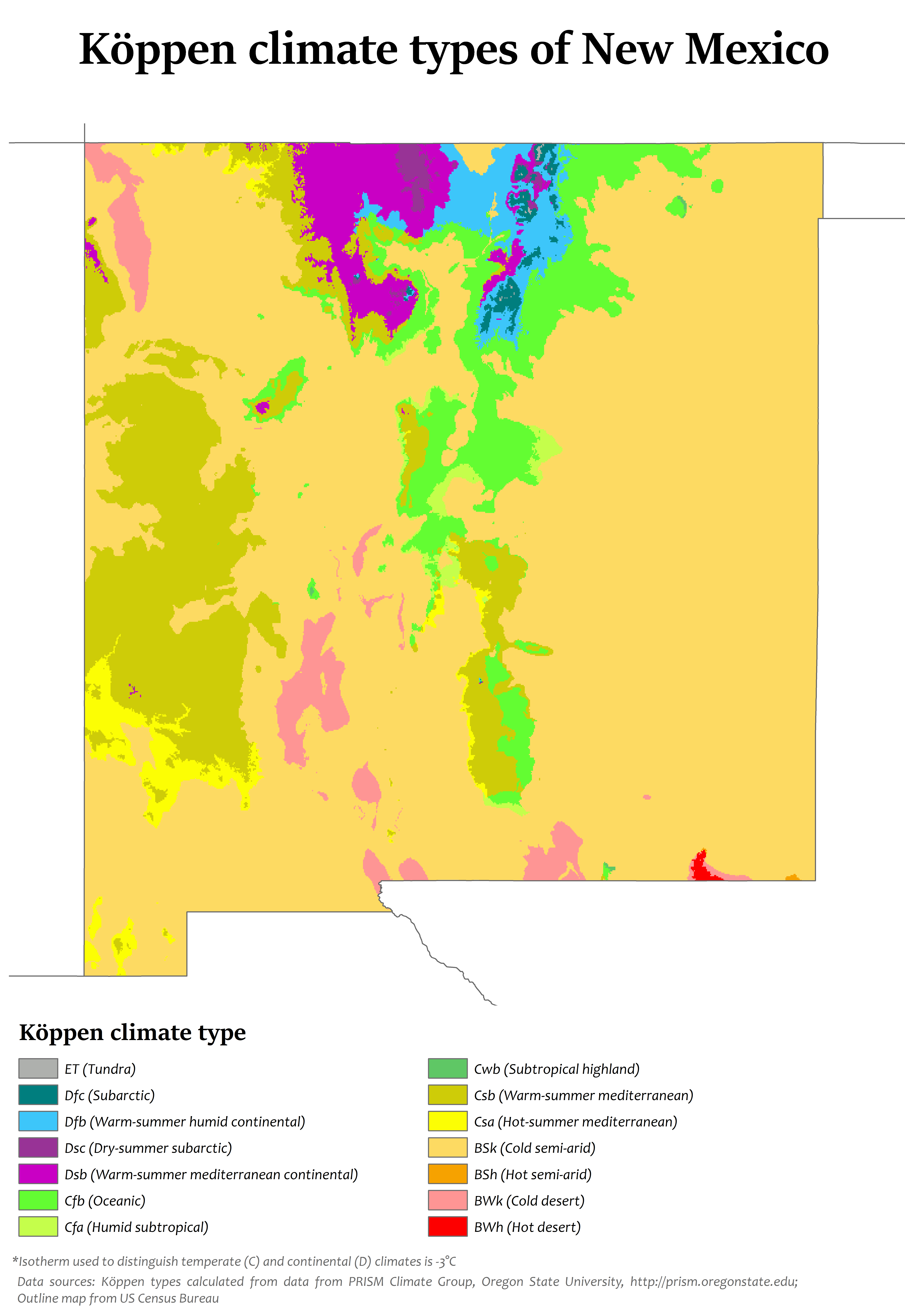
Köppen climate types in New Mexico.

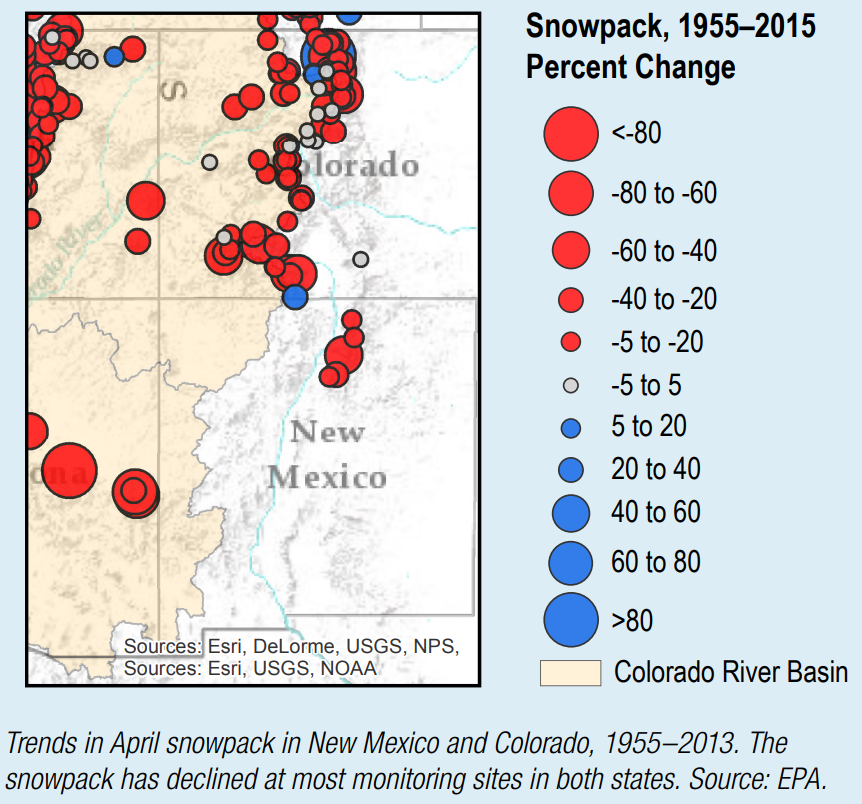
EPA map of changing snowpack levels in Colorado and New Mexico.

Climate change in New Mexico encompasses the effects of climate change, attributed to man-made increases in atmospheric carbon dioxide, in the U.S. state of New Mexico.

According to the United States Environmental Protection Agency, "New Mexico's climate is changing. Most of the state has warmed at least one degree (F) in the last century. Throughout the southwestern United States, heat waves are becoming more common, and snow is melting earlier in spring. In the coming decades, our changing climate is likely to decrease the flow of water in the Colorado, Rio Grande, and other rivers; threaten the health of livestock; increase the frequency and intensity of wildfires; and convert some rangelands to desert". Climate change is adversely affecting New Mexico by increasing temperatures and making the region drier.

== Snowpack ==
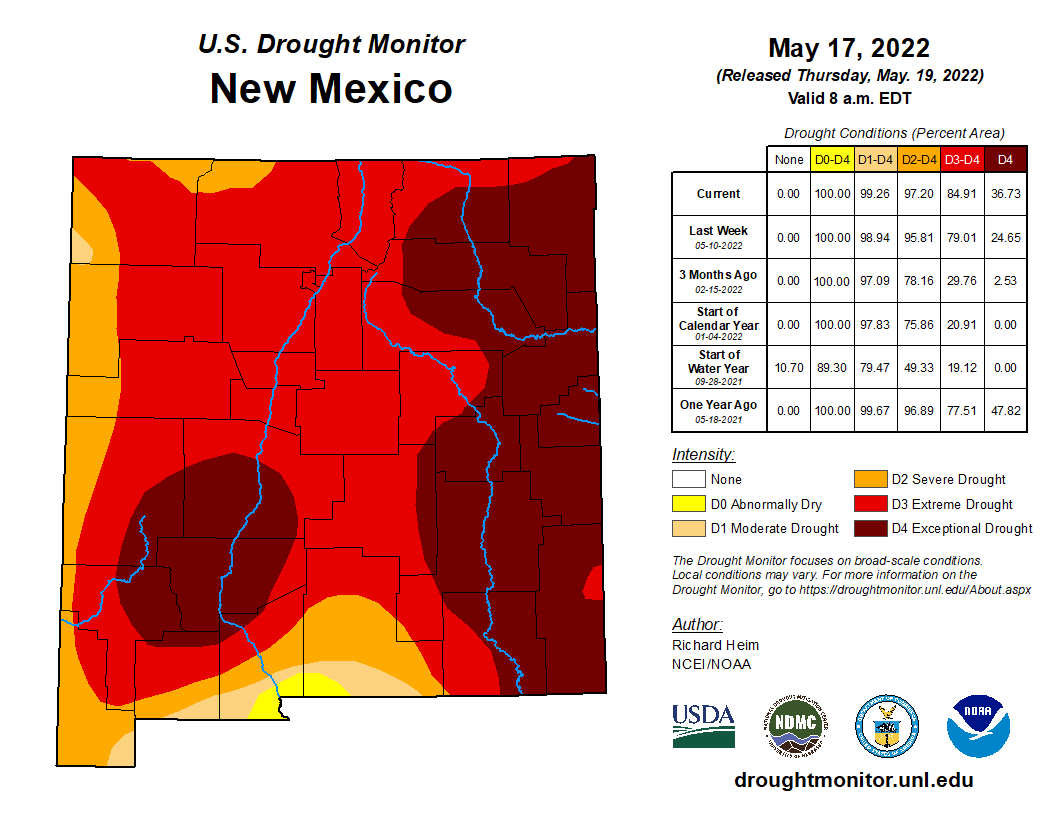
New Mexico drought monitor, May 2022 data

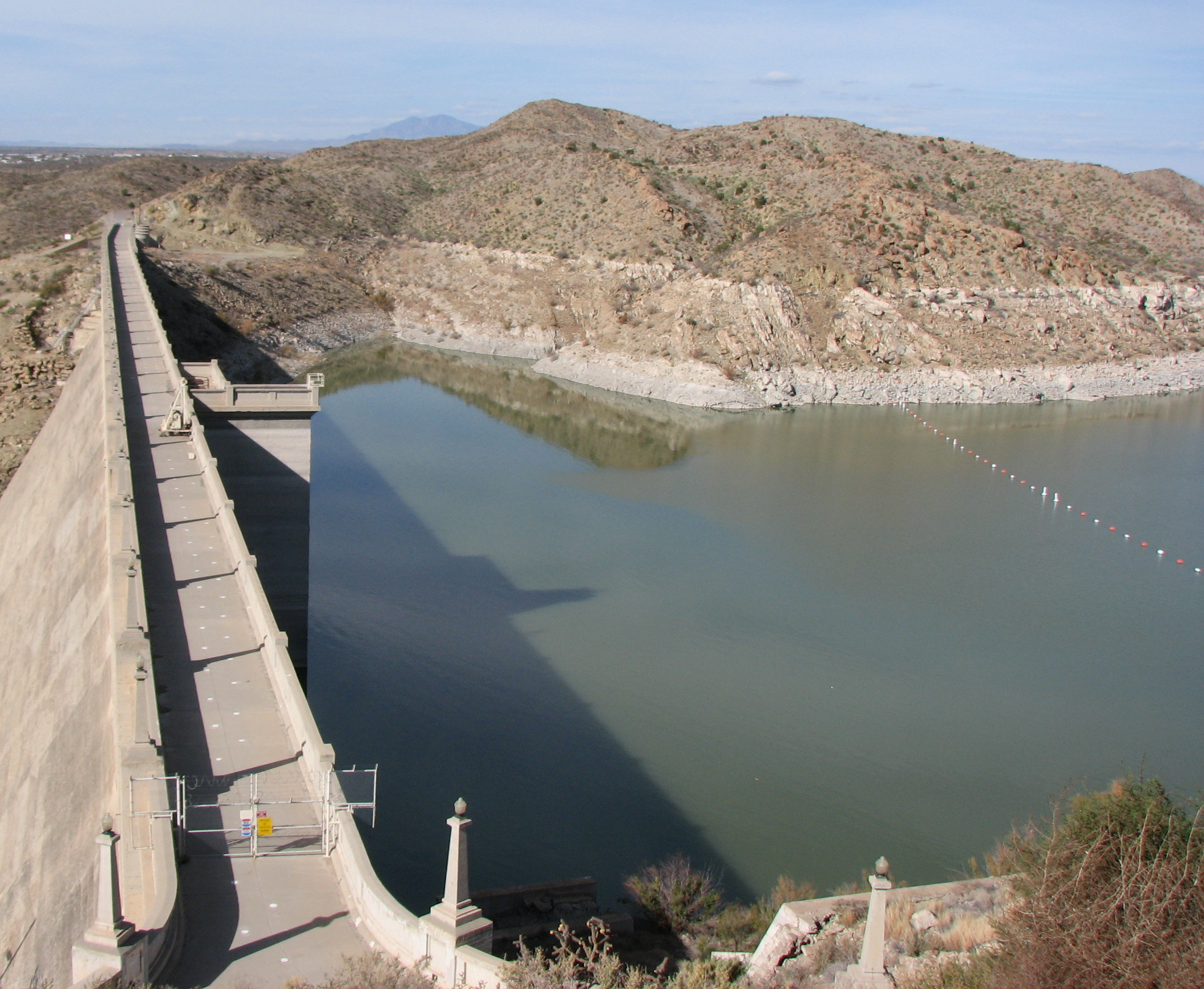
Elephant Butte Reservoir showing "bathtub ring" from drought, 2017

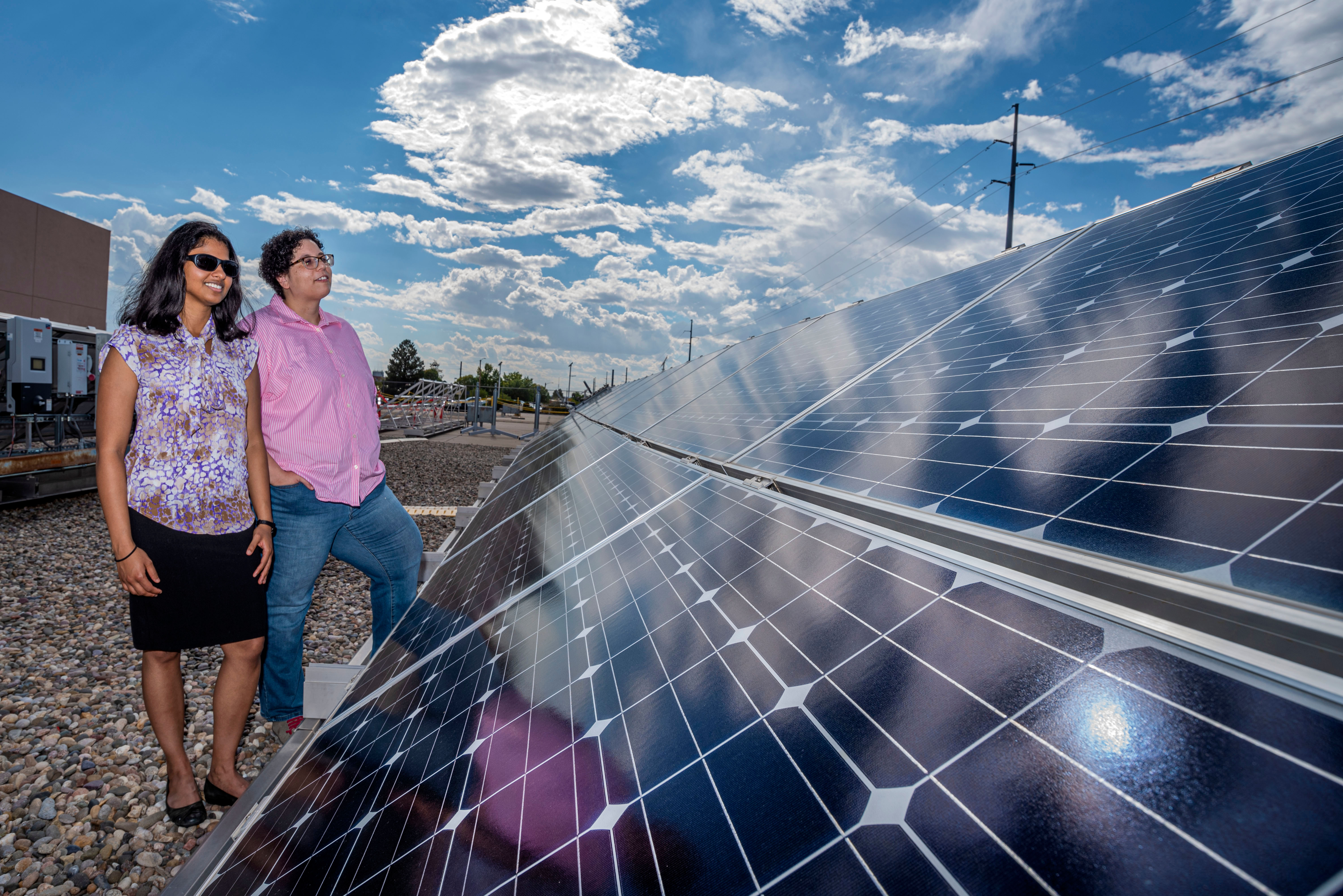
Solar panel research, Sandia National Laboratories, 2021

"As the climate warms, less precipitation falls as snow, and more snow melts during the winter. That decreases snowpack—the amount of snow that accumulates over the winter. Since the 1950s, the snowpack has been decreasing in New Mexico, as well as in Colorado, Utah, and Wyoming, which matters because the headwaters of the Rio Grande, San Juan, Colorado, and Navajo rivers are in those states.

Diminishing snowpack in northern New Mexico will shorten the season for skiing and other forms of winter tourism and recreation. The tree line may shift, as subalpine fir and other high-altitude trees become able to grow at higher elevations. A higher tree line would decrease the extent of alpine tundra ecosystems, which could threaten some species".

== Water availability ==
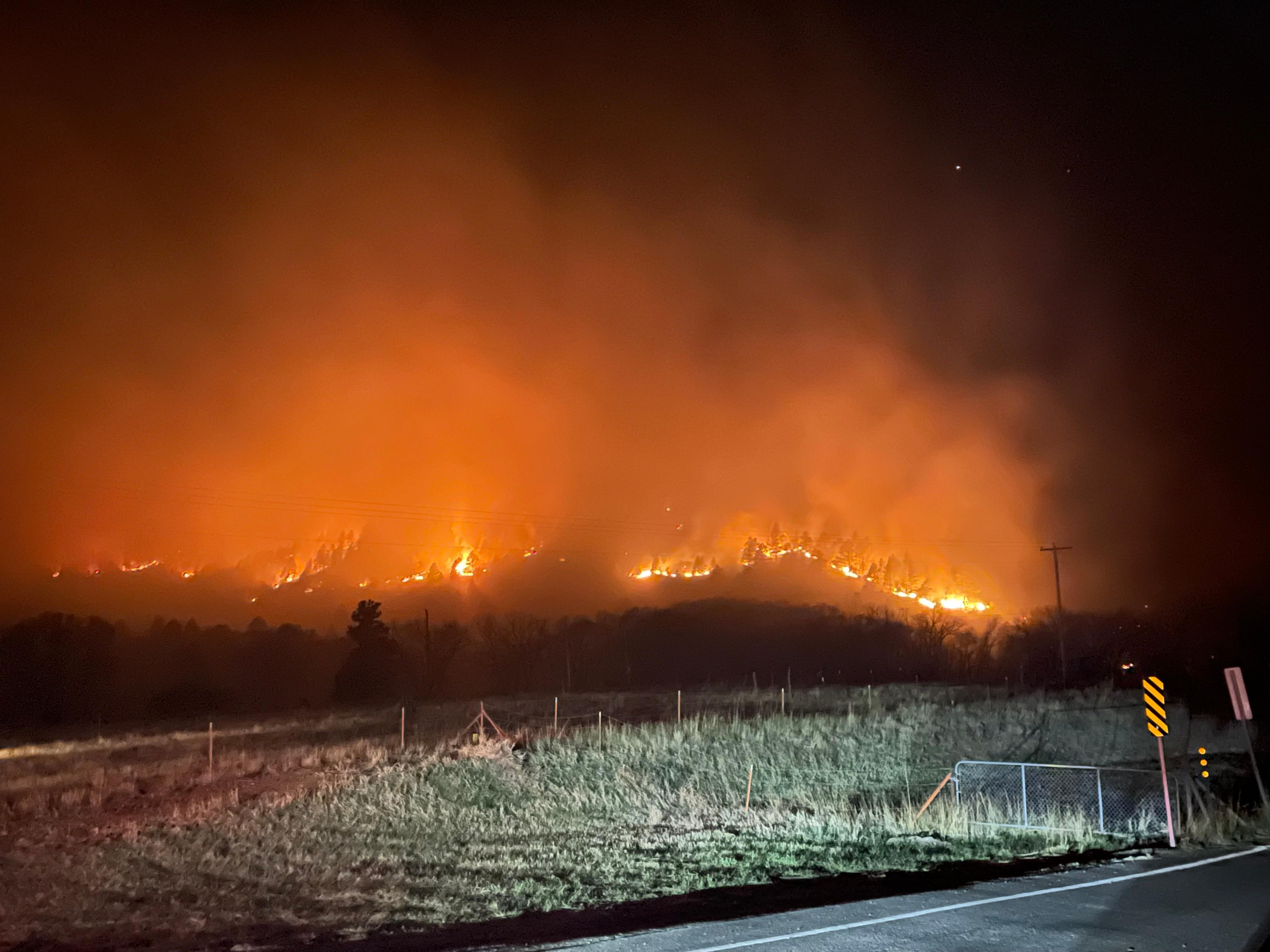
Calf Canyon wildfire, 2022

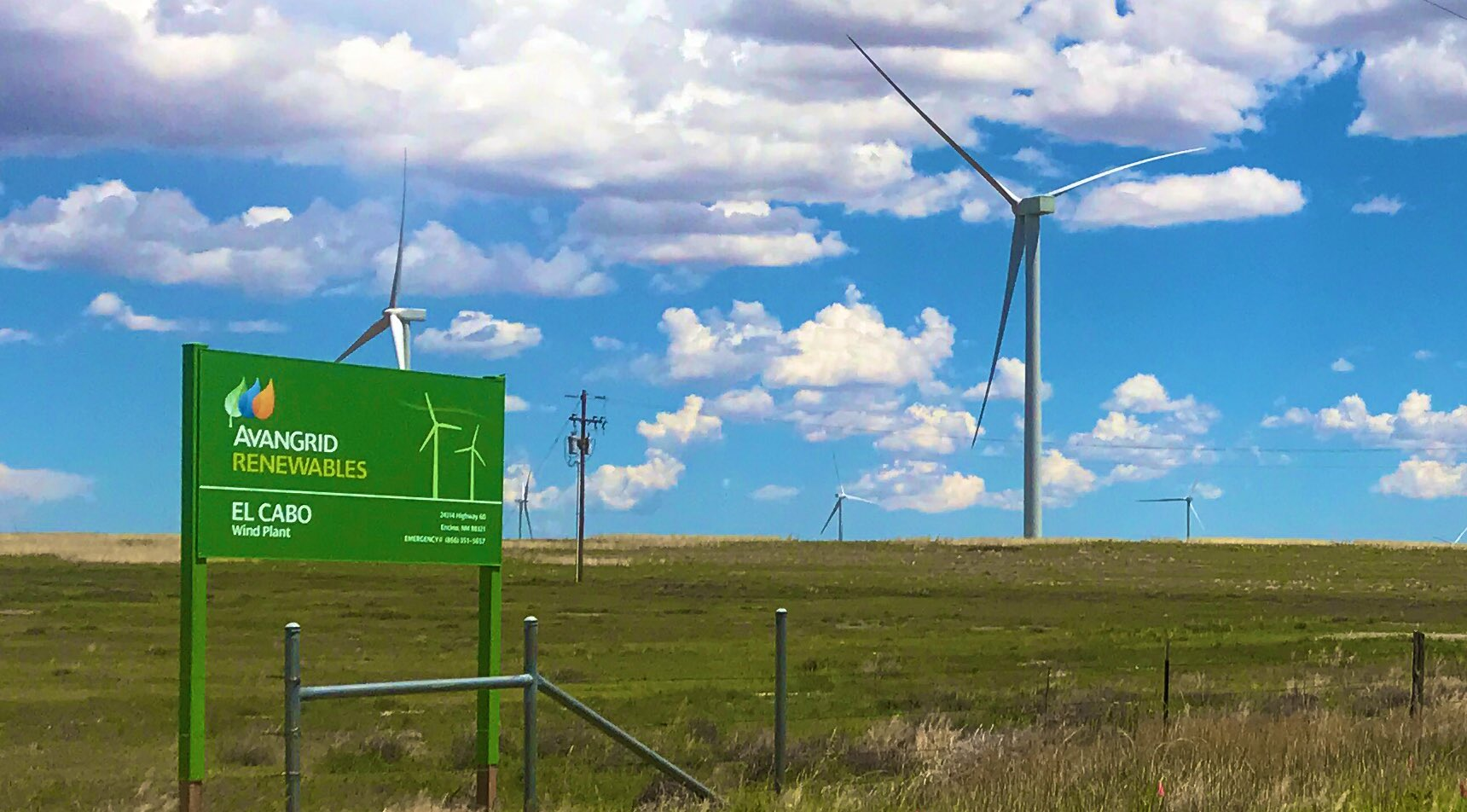
El Cabo Wind Farm, Torrance County

"The changing climate is likely to increase the need for water but reduce the supply. Warmer temperatures increase the rate at which water evaporates (or transpires) into the air from soils, plants, and surface waters. Irrigated farmland would thus need more water. But less water is likely to be available, because precipitation is unlikely to increase enough to make up for the additional water lost to evaporation. Annual rainfall is more likely to decrease than increase. So soils are likely to be drier, and periods without rain are likely to become longer, making droughts more severe. The decline in snowpack could further limit the supply of water for some purposes.

Mountain snowpacks are natural reservoirs. They collect the snow that falls during winter and release water when the snow melts during spring and summer. Over the past 50 years, snowpack has been melting earlier in the year. Dams capture most meltwater and retain it for use later in the year. But upstream of these reservoirs, less water is available during droughts for ecosystems, fish, water-based recreation, and landowners who draw water directly from a flowing river".

Due to the increase in climate change New Mexicos water resources have plummeted. In 2019, the Center for Biological Diversity named New Mexico's Gila River as the nation's most endangered river, due to climate change.

== Agriculture ==
"Increasing droughts and higher temperatures are likely to interfere with New Mexico’s farms and cattle ranches. Hot weather can threaten cows’ health and cause them to eat less, grow more slowly, and produce less milk. Livestock operations could also be impaired by fire and changes in the landscape from grassland to woody shrubs more typical of a desert.

Reduced water availability would create challenges for ranchers, as well as farmers who irrigate fruits, vegetables, pecans, and other nut trees".

== Wildfires and changing landscapes ==
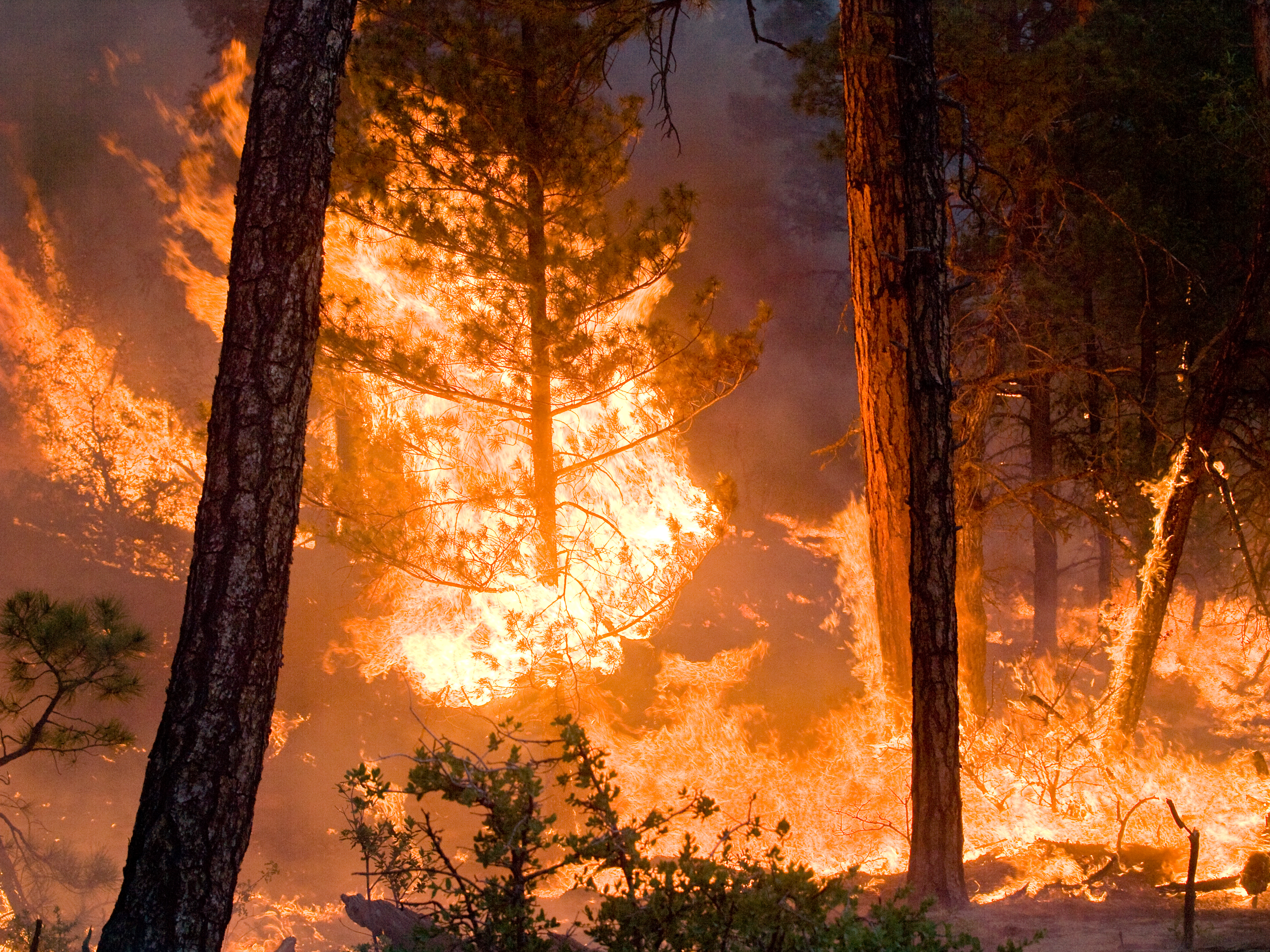
Whitewater–Baldy complex Fire, 2012

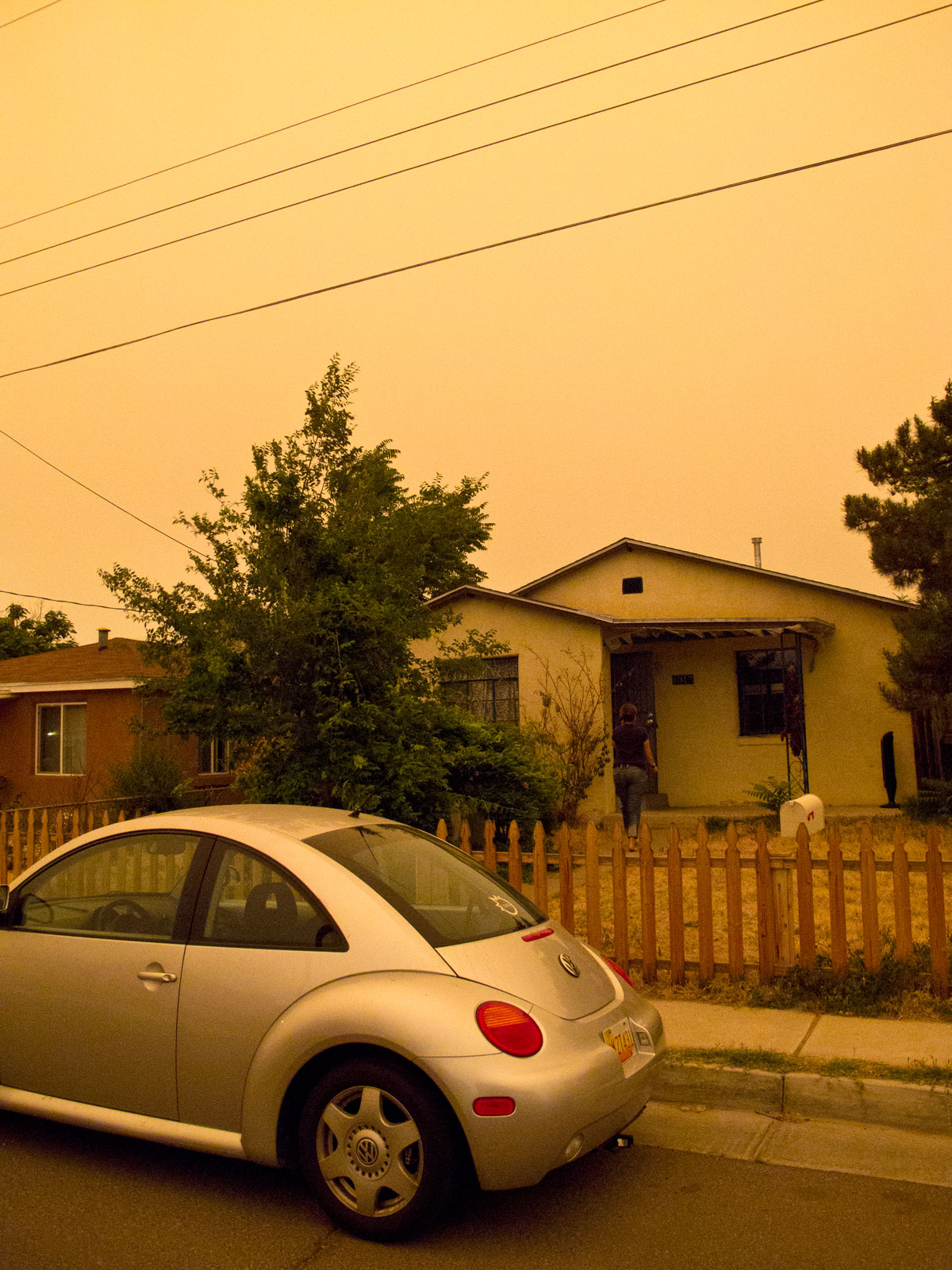
Smoke pollution from wildfires, Albuquerque, 2011

"Higher temperatures and drought are likely to increase the severity, frequency, and extent of wildfires, which could harm property, livelihoods, and human health. On average, more than 2 percent of the land in New Mexico has burned per decade since 1984. Wildfire smoke can reduce air quality and increase medical visits for chest pains, respiratory problems, and heart problems".

"The combination of more fires and drier conditions may expand deserts and otherwise change parts of New Mexico’s landscape. Many plants and animals living in arid lands are already near the limits of what they can tolerate. A warmer and a drier climate would generally extend the Chihuahuan desert to higher elevations and expand its geographic range. In some cases, native vegetation may persist and delay or prevent expansion of the desert. In other cases, fires or livestock grazing may accelerate the conversion of grassland to desert in response to the changing climate. For similar reasons, some forests may change to desert or grassland".

== Pests ==
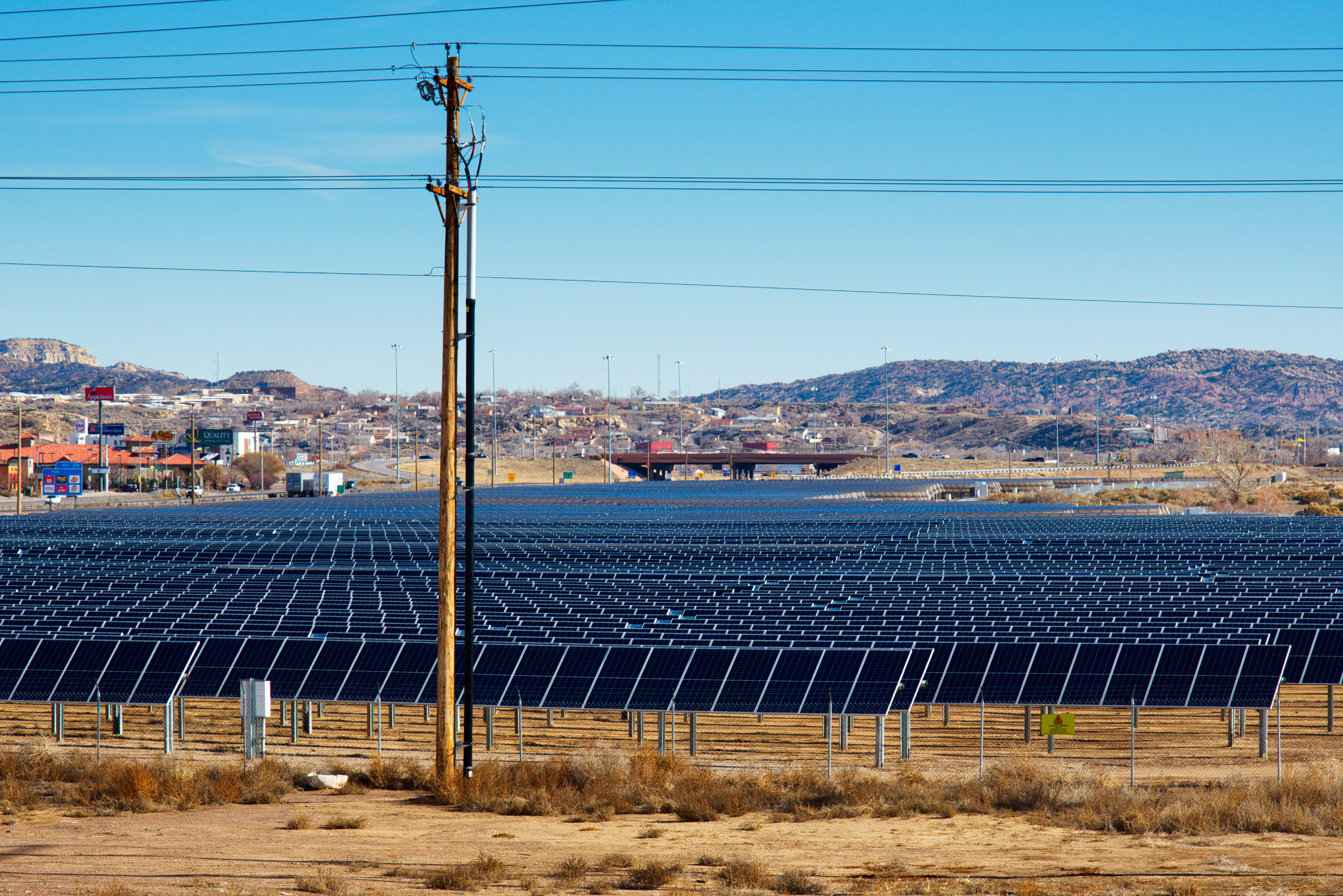
Solar farm, Gallup

"Warmer, drier conditions make forests more susceptible to pests. Drought reduces the ability of trees to mount a defense against attacks from pests such as bark beetles, which have infested 200,000 acres in New Mexico. Temperature controls the life cycle and winter mortality rates of many pests. With higher winter temperatures, some pests can persist year-round, and new pests and diseases may become established".

== Extreme heat ==
"Hot days can be unhealthy—even dangerous. Certain people are especially vulnerable, including children, the elderly, the sick, and the poor. High air temperatures can cause heat stroke and dehydration, and affect people’s cardiovascular, respiratory, and nervous systems. Higher temperatures are amplified in urban settings where paved and other surfaces tend to store heat. Warmer air can also increase the formation of ground-level ozone, a key component of smog. Construction crews may have to increasingly operate on altered time schedules to avoid the heat of the day". New Mexico belongs to the southwest region. Which subsequently since the 1970s New Mexico's average temperature has risen up by 2.7 degrees Fahrenheit because of our lack of effort on reducing the production of greenhouse gasses. Which makes the southwest the hottest and driest region in the United States.

== Tribal communities ==
"Climate change threatens natural resources and public health of tribal communities. Rising temperatures and increasing drought are likely to decrease the availability of certain fish, game, and wild plants on which the Navajo and other tribes have relied for generations. Water may be less available for domestic consumption, especially for those who are not served by either municipal systems or reliable wells, which includes about 30 percent of the people on the Navajo Nation, who must haul water to meet daily needs. Recurring drought and rising temperatures may also degrade the land itself. On the Arizona portion of the Navajo Nation, for example, the Great Falls Dune Field has advanced almost a mile in the last 60 years, threatening roads, homes, and grazing areas. Extreme heat may also create health problems for those without electricity, including about 40 percent of the people on the Navajo reservation.

== Governmental response ==
In January 2019, Governor Michelle Lujan Grisham signed an executive order on addressing climate change and energy waste prevention. From this order, New Mexico joined the United States Climate Alliance with a goal of lowering greenhouse gas emissions by 45% from 2005 levels by 2030. As well as supporting the objective of the Paris Agreement at state level. In addition a Climate Change Task Force was charged with producing a New Mexico Climate Strategy.

== See also ==
- Plug-in electric vehicles in New Mexico
