= Plug-in electric vehicles in New Mexico =

As of April 2022, there were about 4,200 electric vehicles registered in New Mexico. As of 2021, 1.7% of new vehicles sold in the state were electric.

== Government policy ==
As of March 2022, the state government does not offer any tax incentives for electric vehicle purchases.

The first electric vehicles were added to the state fleet in 2019.

== Charging stations ==
As of December 2021, there were about 250 public charging stations in New Mexico.

The Infrastructure Investment and Jobs Act, signed into law in November 2021, allocates US$38 million to charging stations in New Mexico.

== Public opinion ==
A poll conducted in November 2021 by Coltura shows 51% of New Mexico voters in support of requiring all new cars sold in the state to be electric by 2030.

== By region ==
=== Albuquerque ===
As of July 2022, there were about 60 public charging stations in Albuquerque.

=== Santa Fe ===
As of December 2020, there were about 30 public charging stations in Santa Fe.
