= Sally J. Clark =

American city councillor

Sally Clark
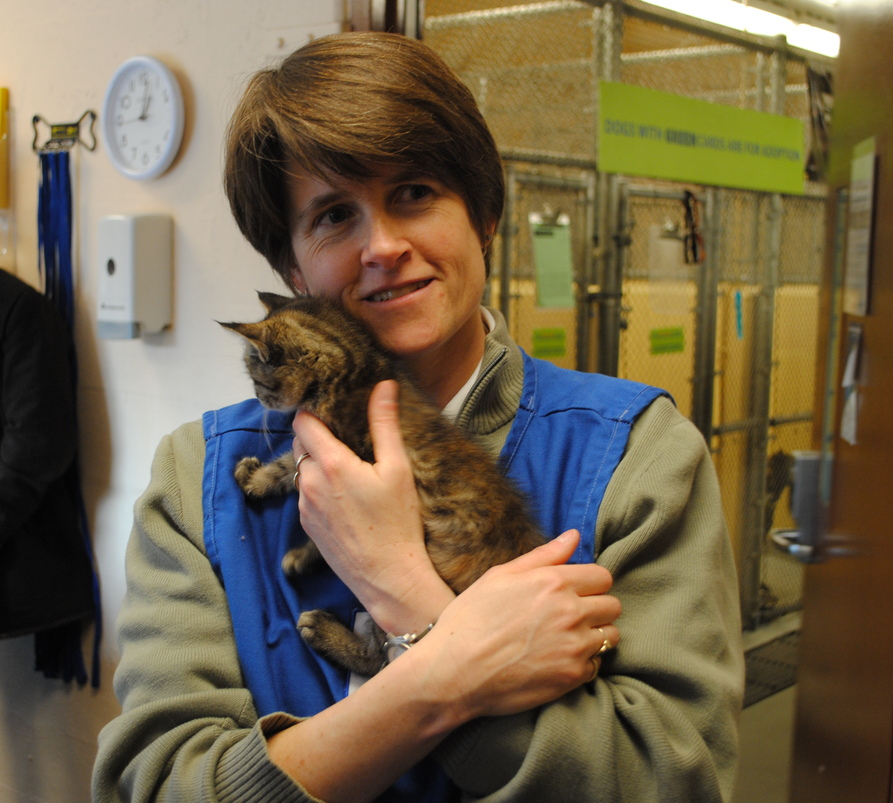
- Sally Clark with a kitten at Seattle Animal Shelter, 2010

Member of the Seattle City Council Position 9
- In office January 27, 2006 – April 4, 2015
- Preceded by: Jim Compton
- Succeeded by: John Okamoto

President of the Seattle City Council
- In office January 3, 2012 – January 3, 2014
- Preceded by: Richard Conlin
- Succeeded by: Tim Burgess

Personal details
- Spouse: Liz Ford
- Education: University of Washington (BA, MPA)
- Website: http://www.seattle.gov/council/clark/

Sally J. Clark is a former member of the Seattle City Council for Position 9 from 2006 to 2015.

== Early career ==
Clark started her career as a print journalist before working for the Chicken Soup Brigade in communications. In 1997, Clark worked for Seattle city councilmember Tina Podlodowski, focusing on neighborhood development and public safety.

Clark's career also includes work with Seattle's Department of Neighborhoods, the Metropolitan King County Council, Northwest Association for Housing Affordability, and Lifelong AIDS Alliance.

== Seattle City Council ==
=== 2006 appointment and election ===
Clark was appointed to fill the vacant seat formerly occupied by Jim Compton in January 2006. In November, she was elected to a one-year term, defeating opponent Stan Lippmann 75% to 23%.

=== 2007 election ===
Clark ran for a four-year term in 2007, running against three challengers. She would get in first with an overwhelming majority of 68%, with challenger, Judy Fenton, only receiving 12%. In the November General Election, Clark would win in a landslide and Fenton, 78% to 22%.

=== 2011 elections ===
Clark ran for a second four-year term in 2011 against two challengers, Dian Ferguson and Fathi Karshie. Both challengers would label Clark as a "follower" and "slow". Clark would focus her campaign on the city budget, supporting the creation and retention of small businesses, and homelessness.

Clark would win the August primary, with 72% of the vote, with Ferguson coming in second with 22%. In the general election, Clark would defeat Ferguson, 65% to 35%.

=== Tenure ===
Clark also served as the Chair of the Select Committee on Minimum Wage and Income Inequality and the Chair of the Select Committee on Taxi, For-Hire, and Limousine Regulations. Clark was additionally a member of the council's Energy Committee and Education and Governance Committee. During her time on the city council and as the Chair of the Committee on the Built Environment. In 2012, the council voted her council president, a role she would stay in until 2013.

In office, she updated the city's "multifamily code" to increase incentives for building low-income housing, expanded Seattle Children's. Clark spearheaded a vote intended to limit the ability of popular ride share companies to operate, by capping the number of drivers they could employ at any time. The movement, led by Sally, passed the Seattle City Council 6-3 on March 17.

In 2012, while serving in her official capacity, Clark struck a bicyclist while driving, opening the city to legal liability for any costs beyond the $25,000 covered by her car insurance. A settlement was reached. The bicyclist received $400,000, with the city paying $375,000.

Throughout her tenure, Clark was labeled "moderate", "a follower", and "indecisive".

In February 2015, Clark announced that she would not seek reelection. In April, she announced she would resign from her seat to take a job at the University of Washington.

== Education ==
Clark is a graduate of the University of Washington (BAs in Political Science and Spanish, and an MPA from the UW's Evans School of Public Affairs).

In 2012, Clark completed Harvard University's John F. Kennedy School of Government program for Senior Executives in State and Local Government as a David Bohnett LGBTQ Victory Institute Leadership Fellow. She is a 2013-2014 Aspen Rodel Fellow.
