= Jane Noland =

American politician

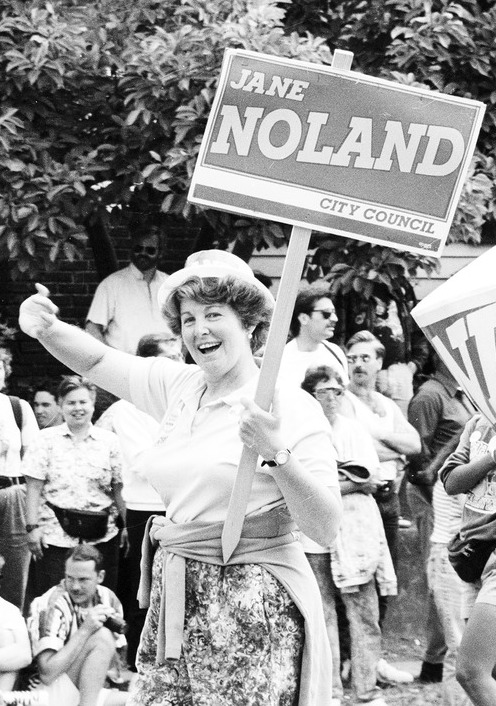
- Jane Noland at the 1993 Seattle Pride Parade

Member of the Seattle City Council for Position 2
- In office January 1, 1986 – January 1, 1998
- Preceded by: Michael Hildt
- Succeeded by: Richard Conlin

Personal details
- Born: Washington, D.C., United States
- Party: Democratic
- Education: Woman's College of the University of North Carolina (BA), Columbia University (MA); University of Puget Sound (JD)

Jane Noland was a member of the Seattle City Council serving from 1986 to 1998.

== Biography ==
Noland was born in Washington, D.C.. She earned her bachelor's degree in history from Woman's College of the University of North Carolina, her master's degree in public law and government from Columbia University and her Juris Doctor from University of Puget Sound. After college, Noland was Peace Corps volunteer and day-care center worker. She then moved to Washington state, where she was legal counsel to the King County Council and a litigation attorney at a private firm.

=== Seattle politics ===
In 1985, council member Michael Hildt chose not to seek reelection, and Noland ran for the open District 2 seat. In the general election, Noland won with 56% of the vote against Barbara Stenson. She would win both of her reelection campaigns in landslides, 73% in 1989 and 79% in 1993.

While in office, Noland was chair of three committees: Housing and Human Services, Public Safety and Utilities and Environment. She focused on different policy areas, mainly women's rights, childcare, and utility ratepayers. Noland, and fellow councilmember Sherry Harris were instrumental in passing amendments to the Women and Minority Business Enterprise (WMBE) ordinance to set aside a specific percentage City contracts for women and minorities. She also worked with council member Tina Podlodowski worked, and passed, legislation to support domestic violence victims.

In 1995, Noland ran for president of the Association of Washington Cities and served from 1996 to 1997.

In 1997, Noland chose not to run for reelection but instead ran for Mayor of Seattle. She lost in the September primary along with fellow councilmember Cheryl Chow.

=== Post-council ===
Noland was appointed to serve on the Seattle Public Library board of trustees from 2009 to 2013.
