= Carl Haglund (real estate) =

American landlord and housing developer

Carl Raymond Haglund (born 1953 or 1954) is the president of Columbia Modern Living, a property management and real estate development company based in Seattle. Haglund has been criticized for his actions as a landlord, and a Seattle law prohibiting landlords from raising rents on properties that do not meet maintenance standards is popularly known as the "Carl Haglund law".

== History ==
In 1992, Haglund hired an attorney to argue successfully for the shutdown of a nightclub near one of his properties for reasons including drug activity, fights, excessive noise, and obstruction of traffic. A judge stated that the club presented a general nuisance to the neighborhood and ordered the club to close.

In 2015, Haglund purchased a run-down building at 6511 Rainier Ave S in Seattle and attracted negative attention for raising rents on some of his tenants by large amounts, such as from $550 to $1,550. Councilmembers Nick Licata and Kshama Sawant criticized the move. Haglund subsequently promised to waive a month's rent for the building's tenants and not to raise rent until the building passed city inspection. Haglund stated that his building at 6511 Rainier Ave S was immune from the city's relocation-assistance requirements due to its below-market rents and tenants breaching the terms of their leases. Haglund later faced fines of $165,000 for failing to comply with tenant relocation assistance rules at a different property.

Councilmember Sawant, referring to Haglund as a "notorious slumlord," proposed a "Carl Haglund law" in 2015 which would ban landlords from raising rents on housing units that do not meet basic maintenance standards. In 2016, the Seattle City Council passed the bill into law. Several tenants' rights advocates referred to the bill as the "Carl Haglund bill" during public comment. In 2017, Haglund filed a lawsuit against the City of Seattle for defamation, seeking $25 million in damages, a retraction of "derogatory comments," and a resolution apologizing to him. Haglund subsequently filed suit against Sawant personally. After a judge dismissed four of Haglund's nine claims, Haglund dropped the remaining ones. The City of Seattle spent about $250,000 defending against the lawsuits.

In 2015, Haglund sued Sherrard Ewing, a tenant in one of Haglund's buildings who left a negative review of the property on Yelp. A King County Superior Court Judge dismissed the lawsuit as "frivolous" and ordered Haglund to pay Ewing's legal bills, which likely amounted to tens of thousands of dollars.

Haglund proposed a 150-unit condominium building with retail space in Columbia City, Seattle in 2016. The city's Southeast Design Review Board subsequently approved the building, subject to conditions, in 2018.

In 2017, Haglund was fined $1.1 million by a Pierce County, Washington Superior Court judge for vandalizing a building in Tacoma that he intended to buy. The plaintiffs contended that Haglund cut holes in drywall ceilings and cut wiring in the building to cause the building to decrease in value or enter foreclosure.

In 2019, Haglund let Weld Seattle, a local charity, use a bungalow that he owns near Mount Baker station as transitional housing for former prisoners and formerly homeless persons. In 2020, Haglund formed the Carl Haglund Foundation which provides grants for education about homelessness and opioid addiction.
