= Socialist Alternative (United States) =

Communist party in the United States

- Abbreviation: SAlt or SA
- Founded: April 1986; 40 years ago (as Labor Militant)
- Headquarters: New York City, New York
- Newspaper: Socialist Alternative
- Membership: ≈1,000 (2020)
- Ideology: Marxism; Revolutionary socialism Trotskyism
- Political position: Far-left
- International affiliation: International Socialist Alternative
- Colors: Red
- Slogan: "Struggle, Solidarity, Socialism"
- Members in elected offices: 0

Website
- socialistalternative.org

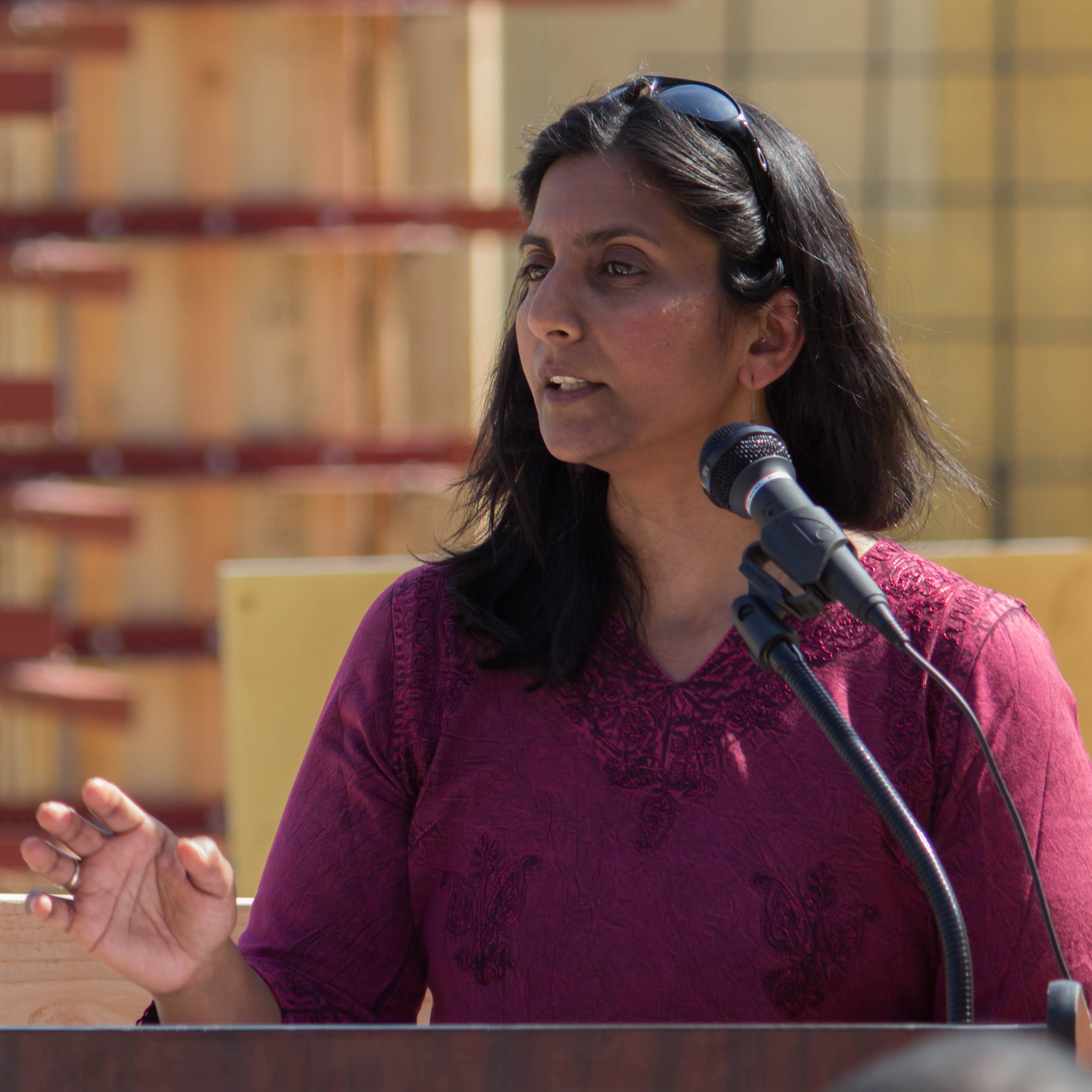
Former SAlt member and former Seattle City Council member Kshama Sawant

Socialist Alternative (SAlt or SA) is a Trotskyist political party in the United States. SAlt formed as Labor Militant in 1986, when members of the Committee for a Workers' International created a US branch.

SAlt describes itself as a revolutionary socialist party fighting for a socialist economy, because it argues that capitalism is fundamentally incapable of serving the interests of the majority of people.

SAlt's highest-profile public representative was former Seattle City Councillor Kshama Sawant, who left the party and created her own, Revolutionary Workers, in 2024.

== Membership ==
In 2012, SAlt claimed to be active in over 50 cities in the United States. In April 2014, SAlt stated it had gained 200 new members after Sawant's victory. In February 2017, SAlt stated its membership had grown 30% since the election of Donald Trump. In February 2020, SAlt stated it had "just under 1,000" members. In August 2023, SAlt had about 1,000 members.

=== Publications ===
In September 2013, SAlt began publishing a national monthly newspaper Socialist Alternative, replacing its former newspaper Justice. SAlt also publishes Boston Organizer, a local bi-monthly newsletter in Boston, Massachusetts, and New York Socialist, a local bi-monthly newsletter in New York, New York.

== History ==
=== Origins ===
SAlt was officially formed as Labor Militant in 1986 by members of the Committee for a Workers' International who had moved to the United States and formed the Labor and Trade Union Group in the early 1980s. Labor Militant was a small group with its membership made mostly of trade union members.

By the mid-1990s, Labor Militant became part of a campaign to form the Labor Party where it was in the leadership of the New York Metro Chapter. The New York Metro Chapter, the largest in the country, saw Labor Militant and its allies run again for the leadership of the chapter under the United Action slate only to be defeated in an Executive Committee election. Labor Militant members and the United Action slate had argued that the Labor Party should vigorously run candidates against the Democrats, whereas the national leadership of the Labor Party refused to take such an approach. After the election, the New York Labor Party State Executive upheld the election results while suspending the New York Metro Chapter and several of its officers, eventually shutting down the chapter.

=== 1990s and 2000s ===
In the late 1990s, Labor Militant changed its name to Socialist Alternative to reflect what was classified as a change in the political period. From 1998 to 2002, SAlt party was active in the anti-globalization movement. It was present at many of the major protests during this time, including the N30 Protests in Seattle. At these protests, it argued that the movement should take up the key demands of "abolish the IMF, World Bank and the WTO", "cancel the international debt", "papers for all undocumented immigrants" and "take the banks and financial institutions into public ownership".

In 2004, SAlt members initiated Youth Against War and Racism (YAWR) as a sustained campaign against the wars in Iraq and Afghanistan. YAWR worked mainly in high schools primarily in counter-recruitment activism in several cities. In 2005, several hundred Seattle's high school students walked out of class in order to march in protest of the war in Iraq causing conflict with parents and school officials who contended that the students should focus on school during the day. Following protests by members of YAWR and SAlt against military recruitment in schools, the Seattle School Board enacted some restrictions on military recruiters at Seattle high schools. The changes included limiting military recruiters to visiting twice a year to each school despite the demands by the YAWR protesters for a total ban on military recruitment at schools.

=== Sawant's Seattle City Council election ===
In 2013, Seattle Central Community College and Seattle University part-time economics professor Kshama Sawant was elected to the Seattle City Council from Position 2 as a candidate for Socialist Alternative. She had previously won 35% of the vote in the August primary election and advanced into the general election against incumbent Richard Conlin. On November 15, 2013, Conlin conceded to Sawant after late returns showed him down by 1,640 votes or approximately 1% of the vote. This made Sawant the first socialist to win a citywide election in Seattle since the communist supporter Anna Louise Strong was elected to the School Board in 1916.

Sawant had previously run for election as the Socialist Alternative candidate in the 43rd district of the Washington House of Representatives against incumbent Democrat Frank Chopp in 2012. Sawant advanced past the primaries for Position 2 while also advancing in Position 1 where she was on the ballot challenging Jamie Pedersen. The Sawant campaign won a subsequent court battle against the Secretary of State for the right to list her party preference on the ballot in the elections. Sawant was endorsed by the Local 587 of the Amalgamated Transit Union and the alternative newspaper The Stranger. She received over 20,000 votes, or 29%.

Sawant's platform included a minimum wage increase to $15 an hour, rent control and taxes on higher-income individuals.

In 2015 and 2019, Sawant was reelected with 56% and 51.8% of the vote respectively. In 2021, Sawant defeated a recall with 50.4% of the vote. In January 2023, Sawant announced that she would not seek re-election, and would instead promote the Socialist Alternative campaign Workers Strike Back to unionize workers.

=== 2010s and 2020s ===
In fall 2011, SAlt was active in the Occupy movement in cities across the country. SAlt argued that the movement should develop concrete demands along working class lines. The party assisted in outreach, planning and organizing public meetings to help grow the campaign.

In 2014, SAlt member and Washington House candidate Jess Spear was arrested during several protests against oil and coal trains moving through Seattle.

In 2020, Socialist Alternative members began joining the Democratic Socialists of America, in order to encourage it to support a socialist independent party.

=== 2024 split ===
In 2024, SAlt split in three. In one split, former leading member Kshama Sawant left, taking Workers Strike Back and some members, and started a new party named Revolutionary Workers. The other split, in August, was a local reflection of the international split within ISA, wherein the faction known as SSFID ("Safeguarding Socialism, Feminism, and Internal Democracy") left to form a new international group, the Project for a Revolutionary Marxist International (PRMI). American sympathizers of PRMI left SAlt as a result.

=== 2026 Expulsions and External Tendency ===
In 2026, a group of members in the Seattle Branch associated with the Faction for Revolutionary Leadership inside SAlt were expelled. In a letter to Cosmonaut, these members declared International Socialist Alternative (Revolutionary), an external tendency of the International Socialist Alternative. In the letter, they outline several differences with the leadership of SAlt, claiming supporters still remain inside ISA in Nigeria and other parts of the US.

== Political positions ==
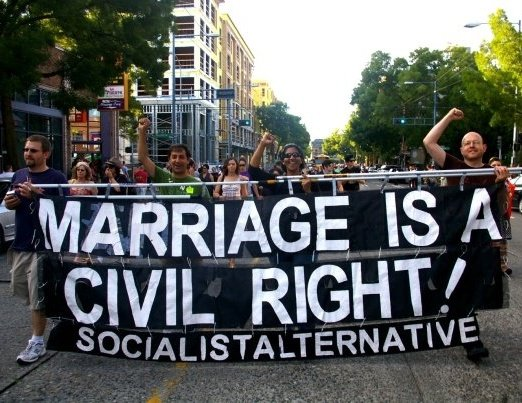
Socialist Alternative members marching for LGBT rights in Seattle, Washington

Socialist Alternative is a Trotskyist, revolutionary socialist party that advocates democratic socialism as an alternative to bureaucratic socialism of the former Soviet Union and the capitalist democratic model, which it sees as designed to benefit only the "ruling class and disenfranchise working people". Despite this, the party has taken a critical approach in recent years towards modern mainstream socialists in the United States, arguing that a violent revolution represents the final step towards a socialist state.

The party holds that the Soviet Union was not socialist but a "tragic degeneration" of the Russian Revolution and the socialist tradition. It views the Russian Revolution favorably as a mass democratic revolution of the working class, but opposes Joseph Stalin's reign of terror after Vladimir Lenin's death. Like other Leninist and Trotskyist parties, it upholds the principles of democratic centralism to ensure "bottom-up democracy" among party members.

Socialist Alternative expressed solidarity with the 2019-2020 Hong Kong protests and opposes the Chinese Communist Party's suppression of opposition.

Unlike most US socialist groups, Socialist Alternative supports a socialist two-state solution in the Israeli–Palestinian conflict, with a democratic socialist Palestinian state and Israeli state and shared capital city in Jerusalem.

== Election results ==
SAlt has fielded electoral candidates for local and state offices.

One SAlt member has won election to public office: Kshama Sawant.

=== Presidential elections ===
In 1996, 2000, 2004, and 2008, SAlt endorsed Ralph Nader.

In 2012 and 2016, SAlt supported Green candidate Jill Stein. In 2020, SAlt endorsed Green and Socialist Party USA nominee Howie Hawkins.

In 2024, SAlt called both Cornel West and Jill Stein "the strongest left, anti-war" candidate.

=== State legislature elections ===
Year	Candidate	Office	Area	District	Votes	%	Result	Notes	Ref
2014	Jessica Spear	State Representative	Washington	43-2	8,606	17.7%	Lost	ran as Socialist Alternative candidate	
2012	Kshama Sawant	State Representative	Washington	43-2	20,425	29.4%	Lost	ran as Socialist Alternative candidate	

=== Local elections ===
Year	Candidate	Office	Area	District	Votes	%	Result	Notes	Ref
2021	Kshama Sawant	City Council	Seattle	3	20,656	50.4%	Won	non-partisan recall election, joined Democratic Socialists of America in February	
2019	Kshama Sawant	City Council	Seattle	3	22,263	52.1%	Won	non-partisan election	
2017	Ginger Jentzen	City Council	Minneapolis	3	3,844	44.2%	Lost	ran as Socialist Alternative candidate, ranked choice election	
2015	Kshama Sawant	City Council	Seattle	3	17,170	56.1%	Won	non-partisan election	
2013	Kshama Sawant	City Council	Seattle	2	93,682	50.9%	Won	non-partisan election	
2013	Seamus Whelan	City Council	Boston	At-Large	3,118	2.6%	Lost	non-partisan, plurality at-large election	
2013	Ty Moore	City Council	Minneapolis	9	1,758	46.9%	Lost	ran as Green Party candidate, ranked choice election	
2007	Matt Geary	City Council	Boston	At-Large	3,025	6.5%	Lost	non-partisan, plurality at-large election	

=== Labor unions ===
Socialist Alternative has also fielded candidates for labor union leadership positions. In 2017, Socialist Alternative member Ryan Timlin was named President-elect of Amalgamated Transit Union Local 1005 in Minneapolis after running unopposed.

== National conventions ==
#	Name	Date	Location	Attendees	Notes	Reports
	2025 National Convention	November 2025	Maryland	"more than 250 socialists" from 18 cities		US Perspectives 2025
	2023 National Convention	October 2023	Chicago, IL			US Perspectives 2024
	2021 National Convention	September 2021				US Perspectives 2021
	2018 National Convention	October 20–22, 2018	Chicago, IL	"over 300 socialists", "biggest ever"		US Perspectives 2018
12th	2016 National Convention	June 11–13, 2016	Denver, CO	"over 220 members" from "33 branches and 20 cities"		US Perspectives 2016; US Perspectives 2017
	2014 National Assembly	April 27, 2014	Seattle, WA	members from 25 cities		
	2012 National Conference	May 26–28, 2012	Minneapolis, MN	"over 75" attendees, 31 "elected delegates"		
	2009 National Conference	May 22-24, 2009	Seattle, WA	"over 70" attendees, "33 elected delegates", from 10 cities		
10th	2007 National Conference	May 2007	Minneapolis, MN	"over 70" members		

== See also ==
- Committee for a Workers' International
- American Left
- Democratic Socialists of America
- International Socialist Alternative
- Green Party of the United States
- History of left-wing politics in the United States
- Labor history of the United States
- Militant tendency
