= Martha Choe =

American politician (born 1954)

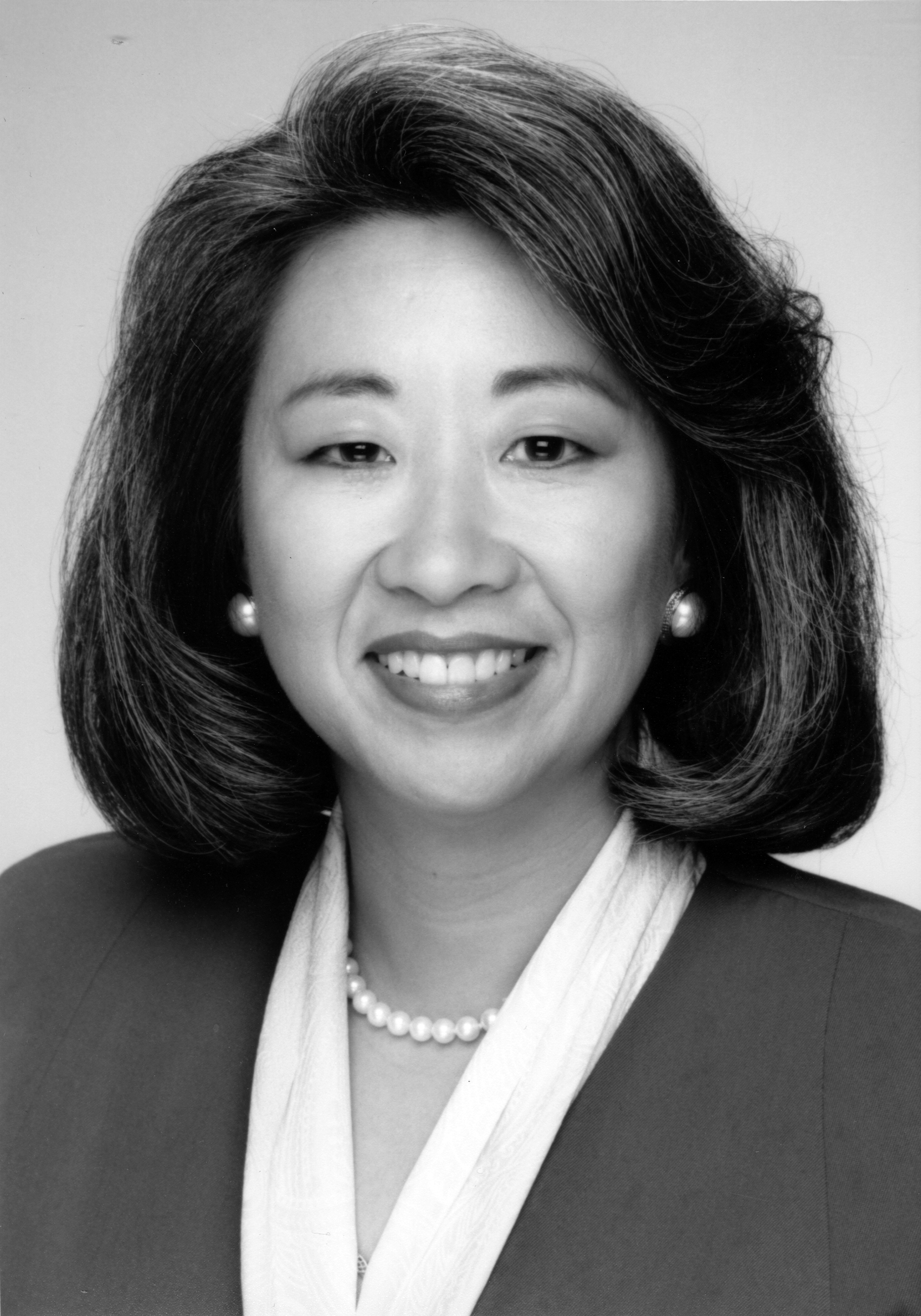
- Choe c. 1995

Member of the Seattle City Council
- In office January 1, 1992 – October 1, 1999
- Preceded by: Dolores Sibonga
- Succeeded by: Jim Compton

Personal details
- Born: November 16, 1954 (age 71)
- Education: University of Washington (BA); Seattle University (MBA

Martha Choe (born November 16, 1954) is an American banker, politician, and foundation executive. She was a two-term member of the Seattle City Council, elected to four-year terms in 1991 and 1995. Choe was the first Korean American elected to the city council and the first to serve in a public office in the United States. Choe succeeded retiring Filipino councilmember Dolores Sibonga and received her endorsement, which elicited controversy from Filipino community members.

== Career ==
Choe served as the chair of the Transportation Committee and was also appointed as a Regional Transit Authority (RTA) boardmember during the early drafting of Seattle's future light rail and commuter train systems. In her role on the committee, she oversaw the first public referendum on the citywide monorail project, a program that she personally opposed. Choe was among a contingent of Asian American leaders and politicians tasked with organizing the 1993 APEC summit, hosted near Seattle on Blake Island. Choe retired from the city council in 1998, having not run for re-election, but was named as a potential candidate in the 2001 mayoral election.

After leaving the city council, Choe next served as director of the Washington State Department of Community, Trade and Economic Development (later Washington State Department of Commerce) under governor Gary Locke. She left that position in 2004, at which time she became director of the Global Libraries initiative at the Bill & Melinda Gates Foundation, where she became chief administrative officer in 2008, a position she held until leaving the Foundation in 2014. In that capacity, Choe had "considerable input" into the design of the Gates Foundation headquarters building.

Beginning in May 2000 she served as one of the inaugural members of the White House Commission on Asian American and Pacific Islanders, advancing in August to become its chair when initial chair Norman Mineta was tapped to be Secretary of Commerce.

Future Seattle mayor Ed Murray served on Choe's staff for four years early in his political career.

== Personal life ==
Choe is the U.S.-born daughter of South Korean immigrants. She graduated from Fairhaven College in 1977 and also has a B.A. from the University of Washington and an M.B.A. from Seattle University.

Prior to serving on the Seattle City Council, she was a board member of the regional Federal Reserve Bank of San Francisco Seattle Branch, a vice president at the Bank of California in Seattle, and a member of the Board of Western Washington University.

Choe also volunteered with the Seattle Chamber of Commerce and the Seattle Foundation. In 2014, Seattle Business Magazine awarded her its lifetime achievement award.
