= Jim Compton =

American politician (1941–2014)

Seattle City Council (Position 9)
- In office November 12, 1999 – January 6, 2006
- Preceded by: Martha Choe
- Succeeded by: Sally J. Clark

Personal details
- Born: April 2, 1941 Klamath Falls, Oregon, U.S.
- Died: March 17, 2014 (aged 72) Seattle, Washington, U.S.
- Spouse: Carol Arnold (m. 2004)
- Education: Reed College (BA); Columbia University (MS)

Jim Compton (April 2, 1941 – March 17, 2014) was a member of the Seattle City Council, first elected in 1999. He announced his resignation in December 2005 to teach at American University in Cairo as well as Romania.

== Early life and education ==
Born in Klamath Falls, Oregon, Compton earned his bachelor's degree in history at Reed College in 1964 and his master's degree at the Columbia University School of Journalism in 1969.

He was a Fulbright Scholar and studied in Romania between 1969 and 1970. His studies focused on Romanian political dissidents, which included interviewing Romanian writers, artists, and filmmakers about their work and how they define Romanian identity.

== Journalism career ==
Compton started his journalism career in 1964 as a radio reporter for KGW-AM in Portland. Compton then went to Italy as an assistant managing editor for the Rome Daily American. He would interview significant world figures such as Anwar Sadat, Moammar Gadhafi, Orson Welles and Jimmy Carter.

In 1984, he joined KING-TV and produced dozens of docuseries, which would garner him the duPont-Columbia Silver Baton and the National Janus Award. In 1987, Compton would host The Compton Report which would run for ten years. He also served as a correspondent for The News Hour with Jim Lehrer.

== Seattle City Council (1999-2006) ==
In 1999, Seattle city council member Martha Choe decided to resign her seat to become the Washington State Department of Community, Trade and Economic Development Director. Compton joined the race to replace Choe, with his primary opponent being WA state representative Dawn Mason. Compton would defeat Mason in the General Election 57% to 43%.

During his time in office, he chaired the Public Safety and Technology Committee, the Utilities & Technology Committee, the Energy & Environmental Policy Committee vice chair, and a Government Affairs & Labor Committee member. While in office, Compton was one of the councilmembers who blocked the reconfirmation of Seattle City Light director Gary Zacker. Compton accused Zacker of being unresponsive to City Light audits.

In 2003, Compton ran for reelection and his primary challenger was former city council member and police Sergeant John E. Manning. In the general election, Compton defeated Manning 56% to 44%.

In December 2005, Compton announced that he planned to resign from the city council effective January 6 to teach in Egypt and Romania. The city council appointed Sally J. Clark to fill Compton's seat for the remainder of the term.

== Controversies ==
=== Strippergate ===
Former Washington state governor Albert Rosellini assisted the Colacurcios family by lobbying six members of the Seattle City Council and raising funds for three of the politicians. In June 2003, James Bush, a reporter for the North Seattle Sun, reported city council members Judy Nicastro, Jim Compton and Heidi Wills received large amounts of campaign donations from the Colacurcio family and their business associates. On June 16, 2003, in a 5–4 vote, the council approved the parking zoning changes, allowing them to use their existing land for parking requested by the Colacurcios.[10] Nicastro, Compton, and Wills would all vote in favor of the expansion.

The Seattle Ethics and Elections Commission investigated the claims, and all the council members returned their donations.

=== Paul Allen's private jet ===
Compton agreed to a $3,000 settlement with Seattle Ethics and Elections Commission after it was revealed that Compton took a trip on a private jet owned by Paul Allen and also received tickets to Portland Trail Blazers games.

== Personal life ==
Compton was married to Seattle lawyer Carol Arnold and had two stepchildren.

In March 2014, Compton was found dead of an apparent heart attack in his car after having dinner with friends the previous night. He was 72.
