= Coltura (organization) =

American environmentalist group

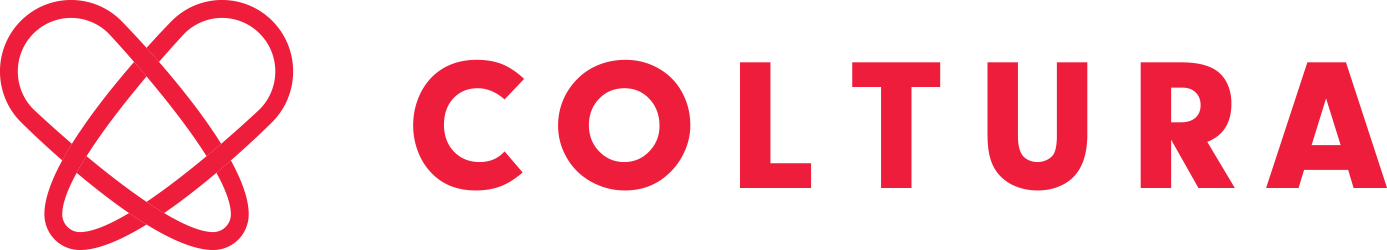
- Founded: 2014; 12 years ago
- Founder: Matthew Metz
- Type: Nonprofit
- Location: Seattle, Washington
- Key people: Matthew Metz (Co-director); Janelle London (Co-director)
- Website: www.coltura.org

Coltura is an American environmental activist group based in Seattle, Washington. The group promotes environmental policies and produces cultural works aimed at ending the United States's use of gasoline, and advocates for policies to phase out the sales of new gasoline-powered vehicles by 2030.

In 2021, Coltura coined the term "gasoline superusers," referring to consumers in the top 10% of gasoline consumption in the United States. Coltura proposed incentives for superusers to become electric vehicle users Coltura has supported state legislation promoting the use of electric vehicles by the biggest users of gasoline, including a Vermont bill regarding "gasoline superusers" that was passed in 2023, as well as a similar Washington state bill that was proposed in 2021.

Coltura has also collected extensive data on gasoline use and gasoline superusers in the United States. A 2021 study by Coltura showed that gasoline superusers comprise about 10 percent of U.S. drivers who drive about 30,000 miles or more per year. These superusers consume 32 percent of all the gasoline used in the U.S.

== History ==
=== Founding ===
Coltura was founded in 2014 by Matthew Metz, an attorney in Seattle, Washington. The name comes from an amalgamation of CO_{2}, the chemical formula for carbon dioxide, and the word culture. The organization was founded as a nonprofit with the mission of "Eliminating gasoline use in America by 2040". Metz serves as co-director along with Janelle London.

=== Legislative and policy efforts ===
In March 2020, Coltura led a coalition to pass Zero Emissions Vehicle legislation in Washington State, and supporting a Washington State legislation mandating that all new cars sold be electric by 2030. The 2030 mandate bill did not pass in 2020. Although it passed the legislature, it was vetoed by Governor Jay Inslee in 2021. In 2022, legislation passed and was signed into law by Governor Inslee setting a state target for phasing out the sale of new gas vehicles by 2030, but regulations have been implemented to mandate that all new cars be zero-emissions vehicles by 2035. They have also sponsored legislation in the California State Assembly, working with Phil Ting of San Francisco, to target EV incentives to the drivers who use the most gasoline.

=== Recharge Required report ===
On June 1, 2018, Coltura released a report, Recharge Required, on the status of the state of Washington's agencies adherence to a 2007 law requiring "vehicles in government fleets to run on electricity or biofuel... 'to the extent practicable'". According to the report, in contrast to the 100% adherence set as the goal for June 1, 2015, less than 6% of vehicles in use by county and city agencies and 2% of the state's motor pool meet this goal.

=== Art events ===
Coltura has staged street theatre and performance art. In September 2016, they staged performances at gas stations, public events, and streets in Seattle to raise awareness about pollution-emitting gasoline vehicles. At Seattle Design Festival, they displayed an art installation and performed at the First Thursday Art Walk and Bumbershoot. Actors billed as "gasoline ghosts", carrying gasoline hoses and nozzles and dressed in white leotards, drew attention to the air pollution and greenhouse gases created by gasoline use. The "ghosts" showed their affection for gasoline, and comedically chased down cars to inhale their exhaust.

In October 2016, the organisation staged a procession entitled Funeral for Gasoline as part of No Gasoline Day, in which actors carried a casket containing a fuel nozzle from the Space Needle to Downtown Seattle. They won the 2017 Sustainable Seattle Arts and Culture Award for this performance and "for helping change cultural norms about the use of gasoline through mobile and interactive live performance, social media, and imagery and videos challenging the cultural status quo."

In June 2017, the group exhibited The Gas Trap, a 25-foot high clear vinyl bubble connected to the tailpipe of a gasoline-powered car, accompanied by a theatrical piece. The work was a collaboration between Metz, Samaj, the Seattle Design Nerds, Alyssa Norling and Grace Orr. During the performance staged in Westlake Park in Seattle, the performers appeared to be trapped inside and gasping for breath as artificial smoke filled the bubble. The performance was staged again on September 10 at the Roundhouse Community Centre|Roundhouse Community Arts and Recreation Centre in Vancouver, British Columbia.

They held a mural contest in 2017 and collaborated with the artist Craig Cundiff to produce a large mural in the industrial Georgetown district of Seattle. It depicts a boy wearing a mask over his mouth and nose, with a view of the city's congested highways, hazy sky and setting orange sun in the background.

Their gas ghosts and gasoline video have received widespread publicity.

In 2018, Coltura produced a video calling for the world to abandon fossil fuels in favor of electric vehicles, with a cameo of Energy Secretary Jennifer Granholm singing.
