= Sustainable Seattle =

Sustainable Seattle is a non-profit organization that promotes sustainability in Central Puget Sound. It was officially founded as a non-profit in 1991. Sustainable Seattle was the first organization to create regional indicators for sustainability. This work influenced many cities and groups around the world and it works in sustainability indicators based on citizens’ values and goals for their communities. The public policy think tank, Redefining Progress, surveyed over 170 sustainability projects around the country and found that more than 90 of them used Sustainable Seattle as a model for their initiatives.

For the first decade of its existence, Sustainable Seattle focused on creating regional sustainability indicators through grassroots activism. It also created monthly newsletters about such topics as recycling, home gardening, and community building. Home gardening became a phenomenon in the DIY community. In its second decade, Sustainable Seattle expanded into many areas, from neighborhood data collection and Neighborhood Sustainability Scorecards to education programs, programs for businesses, and an annual competition to create a shared vision for a sustainable future in Seattle.

Sustainable Seattle is believed to be the first Sustainable Community organization. Today, there are over 50 "Sustainable Community" organizations in Washington and hundreds across America.

== Founders ==
- Alan Atkisson
- Karla Berkendall
- Nea Caroll
- Richard Conlin
- Jan Drago
- Susan Hall
- Steve Nicholas
- Vicki Robin
- David Smukowski

== See also ==
- The Pollinator Pathway
