= Kshama Sawant =

Indian-American politician and economist

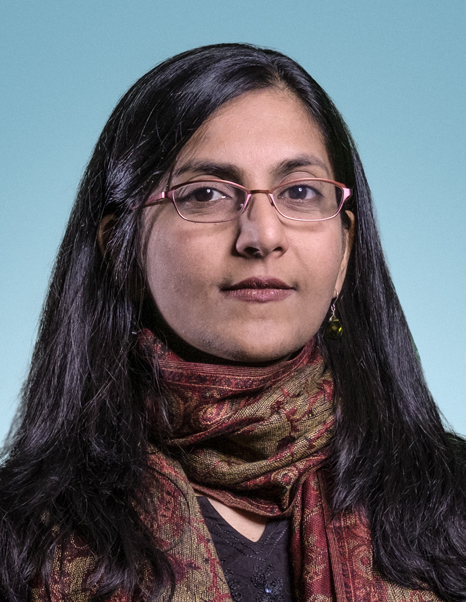
- Sawant in 2016

Member of the Seattle City Council
- In office January 1, 2014 – January 1, 2024
- Preceded by: Richard Conlin
- Succeeded by: Joy Hollingsworth
- Constituency: Position 2 (2014–2016); 3rd district (2016–2024)

Personal details
- Born: October 17, 1973 (age 53) Pune, India
- Party: Socialist Alternative (2008–2024); Revolutionary Workers (2024–present)
- Other political affiliations: Democratic Socialists of America (2021–2024) (2026) (Note: The Democratic Socialists of America (DSA) are not a registered political party. Instead, they are a political organization for those with democratic socialist ideologies. Sawant is a member of the Seattle DSA chapter, but is not an endorsed candidate.)
- Spouses: Vivek Sawant (before 2016); Calvin Priest (m. 2016)
- Education: University of Mumbai (BS); North Carolina State University (MA, PhD)
- Website: Campaign website

Kshama Sawant (/kəˈʃʌmɑː sɑːˈwʌnt/ kə-SHUM-ah sah-WUNT; born October 17, 1973) is an American socialist politician and economist who served on the Seattle City Council from 2014 to 2024. She was a member of Socialist Alternative and the first and only member of the party to date to be elected to public office, until part of the party split to found Revolutionary Workers.

A former software engineer, Sawant became an economics instructor in Seattle after immigrating to the United States from her native India. She ran unsuccessfully for the Washington House of Representatives in 2012 before winning her seat on the Seattle City Council in 2013. She was the first socialist to win a citywide election in Seattle since Anna Louise Strong was elected to the school board in 1916. Sawant narrowly survived a December 7, 2021 recall election for her position on the council by a margin of 310 votes, or 0.76%. It was the first held in Seattle since 1975.

In January 2023, Sawant announced that she would not seek re-election, and would instead promote the Socialist Alternative campaign Workers Strike Back to unionize workers. In 2024, Sawant announced she had left Socialist Alternative and formed her own party Revolutionary Workers. She launched her candidacy for the 2026 United States House of Representatives election in Washington's 9th congressional district as an independent in June 2025, but failed to advance to the general election.

== Early life and career ==
Kshama Sawant was born into a middle-class Tamil family in Pune, Maharashtra, India. She was raised mostly in Bombay. Her mother was a school principal and her father, a civil engineer, was killed by a drunk driver when she was 13 years old. She describes her family as well-educated but not especially political.

Sawant graduated with a bachelor's degree in computer science from the University of Mumbai in 1994. After moving to the United States in 1996 with her husband Vivek Sawant, a Microsoft software engineer, she decided to turn her attention to economics following a year and a half stint as a programmer. She received her PhD in economics from North Carolina State University in 2009. Her dissertation was titled Elderly Labor Supply in a Rural, Less Developed Economy.

After moving to Seattle, Sawant taught at Seattle University and University of Washington Tacoma and was an adjunct professor at Seattle Central College. She was also a visiting assistant professor at Washington and Lee University in Lexington, Virginia.

== Early political career ==
Sawant has indicated that the genesis of her becoming a socialist began in India and was reinforced upon her arrival in the United States, which she described as "the wealthiest country in the history of humanity", yet is subject to poverty and homelessness. In 2008, she attended a Socialist Alternative meeting after reading a pamphlet and became a member.

In 2012, Sawant ran unsuccessfully for Position 1 in the 43rd district of the Washington House of Representatives, representing Seattle. Sawant also ran and advanced past the primaries as a write-in win for Position 2. Washington state law allowed her to choose the election in which she would run, but as a write-in candidate, she was not permitted to state her party preference. Sawant successfully sued the Washington secretary of state for the right to be listed as a Socialist Alternative member on the ballot. Sawant challenged incumbent Democratic House speaker Frank Chopp in the general election on November 6, 2012. She received 29% of the vote to Chopp's 70%.

== Seattle City Council ==
=== 2013 election ===
After her unsuccessful run for the House, Sawant entered the race for Seattle City Council with a campaign organized by the Socialist Alternative. She won 35% of the vote in the August primary election, and advanced into the general election for the at-large council position 2 against incumbent Richard Conlin, making her the first socialist to advance to a general election in Seattle since 1991. On November 15, 2013, Conlin conceded to Sawant when returns showed him down by 1,640 votes or approximately 1% of the vote.

Sawant's victory made her the first socialist to win a citywide election in Seattle since Anna Louise Strong was elected to the School Board in 1916 and the first socialist on the City Council since A. W. Piper, elected in 1877. She was sworn into office on January 6, 2014.

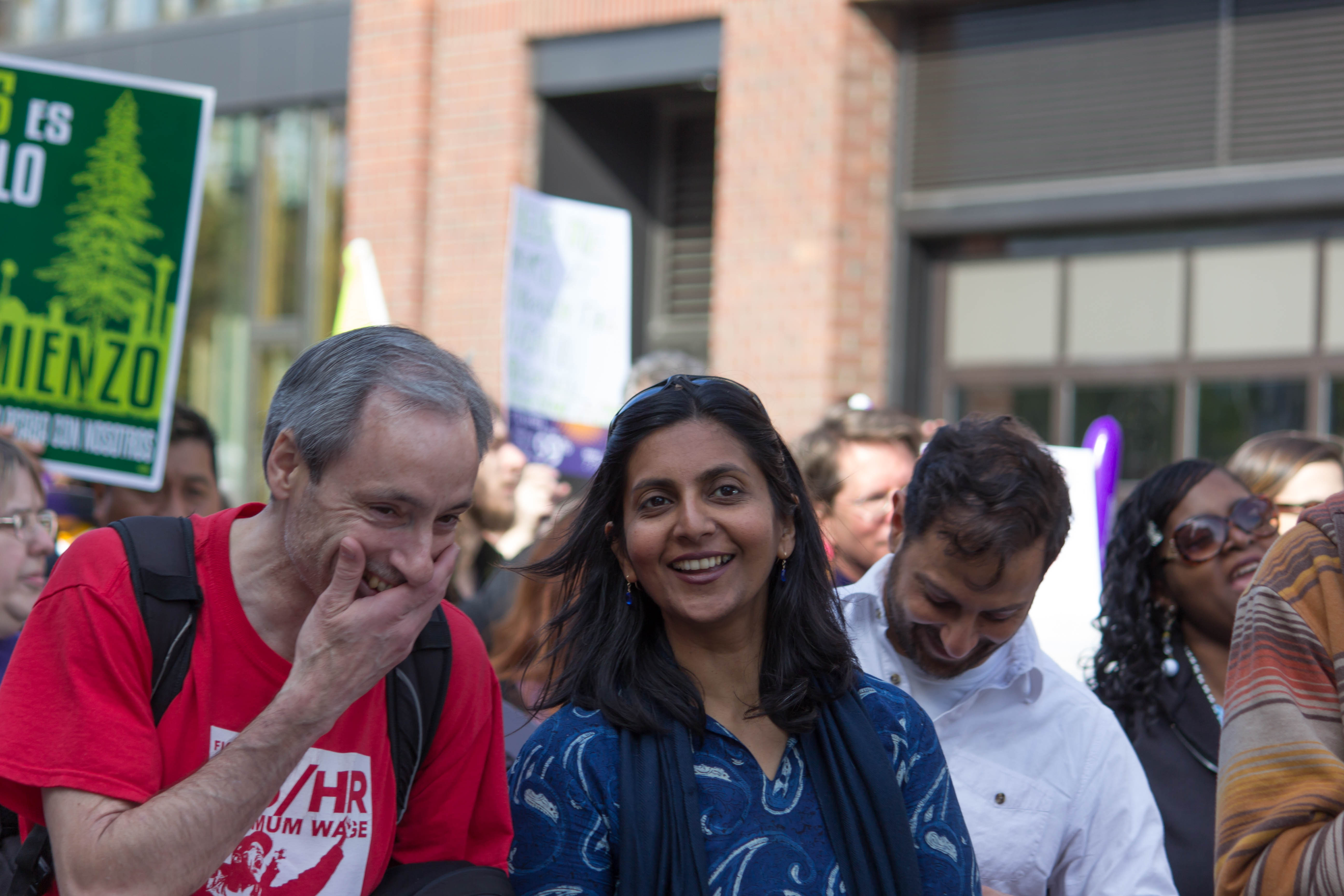
Sawant on $15/hr National Day of Action in 2015

Sawant declared victory in May 2014 after Seattle Mayor Ed Murray announced an increase in the minimum wage to $15, which was the cornerstone of her campaign for City Council; she was not pleased that large corporations would be allowed a few years to phase in the wage hike. During a speech at the City Council on the day of the vote she said, "We did this. Workers did this. Today's first major victory for 15 will inspire people all over the nation."

Several Democrats endorsed her candidacy. Celebrity endorsements included Rage Against the Machine guitarist Tom Morello and System of a Down frontman Serj Tankian.

Sawant received no endorsements from sitting councilmembers, while Mike O'Brien expressed support of the idea of third-party candidates but explicitly declined to extend an endorsement of Sawant. The Stranger alt-weekly endorsed both her State House and her City Council candidacy. Councilman Nick Licata also declined to endorse her but spoke positively of her campaign saying, "she has been able to craft a message that is understandable, simple and eschews most of the rhetoric", and when her eventual election victory seemed unlikely, he expressed his hope that Sawant would not "disappear after the election if she loses. She represents the poor, the immigrants, the refugees—the folks who are not in our City Council offices lobbying us."

=== 2015 election ===
The core issues of Sawant's campaign were a successful minimum wage increase to $15/hour, a successful "millionaire's tax" or income tax on wealthy Seattleites, and an unsuccessful rent control program. During the 2013 campaign, Sawant had said rent control is "something everyone supports, except real estate developers and people like Richard Conlin" and compared the legal fight for its implementation to same-sex marriage, and the legalization of marijuana in the United States, both of which she supports. Her campaign for a $15 an hour minimum wage has been credited for bringing the issue into the mainstream and attracting support for the policy from both Seattle former Mayors Michael McGinn and Ed Murray. In response to criticism that a $15 an hour minimum wage could hurt the economy, she said, "If making sure that workers get out of poverty would severely impact the economy, then maybe we don't need this economy." She is also a supporter of expanding public transit and bikeways, ending corporate welfare, ending racial profiling, reducing taxes on small businesses and homeowners, protecting public sector unions from layoffs, living wage union jobs, and social services.

Sawant's platform of non-local Seattle issues, like rent control, income tax, corporate welfare, supporting the minimum wage outside Seattle, in SeaTac, and other cities, and participating in the Seattle Arctic drilling protests drew criticism from Sawant's opponents and favor with her leftist supporters. Her District 3 opponent Pamela Banks criticized Sawant's status as a national figure as a distraction from her primary duty to serve her constituents. The Seattle Times, in their endorsement of Banks, said the City Council "isn't a job for an ideologue" and that "the District 3 seat is more than a podium", that it "needs a collaborative leader to work with other districts and balance resources and investment." On April 7, 2015, journalist Chris Hedges endorsed Sawant.

Sawant advanced through the primary election for City Council District 3 representative on August 4, 2015, with 52% of the vote, 18 percentage points ahead of her closest opponent, Pamela Banks at 34%. Voters returned Sawant to the City Council and made her the first District 3 representative in November 2015, with 17,170 votes counted for Sawant and 13,427 for Banks, or 56% to 44%. With incumbent O'Brien elected to District 6, and former Licata aide Lisa Herbold elected to District 1, they, along with Sawant, became the new progressive bloc of the council, which became majority female with the addition of two other women, Debora Juarez and Lorena González. Sawant, as one of the four people of color on the new Council, also became part of a younger and more diverse Council, the first to seat members by district in more than 100 years.

=== 2019 election ===
In 2019, Sawant ran for a third term and was one of three incumbents running for reelection that year. She had five challengers, including Egan Orion, the head of a local chamber of commerce in Capitol Hill, Zachary DeWolf, a Seattle School Board member, Ami Nyguen, a public defender, and Logan Bowers, a local marijuana shop owner. Sawant did not participate in the city's Democracy voucher program, but raised nearly three-times the amount of her nearest opponent, Bowers who primarily raised money through the program.

In the August primary, Sawant came in first, with 36.71% of the vote, and advanced to the general with Orion, who earned 21.49%. She received the lowest voting percentage of the three incumbents running for reelection.

The 2019 Seattle City Council election gained national attention after Amazon spent an unprecedented $1.5 million on the campaign. The company, which is the largest private employer in the city, contributed the funds to Civic Alliance for Sound Economy (CASE), a political action committee operated by the Seattle Metropolitan Chamber of Commerce, which backed candidates the chamber considers to be more "business-friendly." The PAC supported Orion in the race, who said that he "didn’t realize CASE had political positions." The race would become the most expensive race in Seattle.

On November 5, 2019, Sawant defeated Orion in the general election, 51.8% to 47.7%, and was elected to a third term.

=== 2021 recall election ===
Precinct results of the 2021 Seattle City Council 3rd district recall election (blue: recall; green: no recall)

In August 2020, petitioner Ernie Lou submitted a petition to the King County Elections Office to recall Sawant, charging that Sawant "used her position in violation of the law or has recklessly undermined the safety of others," including open city council to protests, the march on Mayor Durkan's home, and encouraging people to occupy the Capitol Hill Occupied Protest. The charges that was argued and approved by the court were: 1. Delegated city employment decisions to a political organization outside city government, 2. used city resources to support a ballot initiative and failed to comply with public disclosure requirements related such support, 3. disregarded state orders related to the COVID-19 pandemic and endangered the safety of city workers and other individuals by admitting hundreds of people into city hall on June 9, 2020, when it was closed to the public, and 4. led a protest march to Mayor Jenny Durkan's private residence, the location of which Sawant knows is protected under state confidentiality laws.

Sawant responded by denying the charges in the petition and claiming that right-wing billionaires backed the recall effort. Sawant would appeal the district court's ruling allowing the recall effort to move forward, and in April 2021 the Washington Supreme Court ruled that the recall effort could move forward. Sawant's legal defense was funded by the city council using taxpayer funds.

In September 2021, the King County Elections Office set the recall election date for December 7. Sawant's strategy for the recall election focused on driving up turnout among young voters, one of her core constituencies. It was the first recall election held in Seattle since the 1975 recall election against Mayor Wesley C. Uhlman. The results of the election were close, with Sawant overcoming the recall by 310 votes, which was 0.76% of the 41,033 votes cast. The turnout was 52.9%.

On January 19, 2023, Sawant announced that she would retire from the city council at the end of the year, and that she would be launching Workers Strike Back, a national labor movement.

=== Tenure ===
During her campaign, Sawant said that, if elected, she would donate the portion of her salary as a City Council member that exceeded the average salary in Seattle. On January 27, 2014, she announced that she would live on $40,000 of her $117,000 salary. She placed the rest into a political fund that she used for social justice campaigns. As of September 19, 2021, she cited her current city-allotted salary as $140,000, while she continued to take home $40,000 of that amount.

Sawant and Nick Licata attempted to revive an employee hours tax, known as the head tax, in 2014 to fund King County Metro service after the agency announced that its reduced revenue would lead to reduced bus service hours. The $18 per employee tax was opposed by downtown businesses and not considered by the city council, who instead placed a vehicle registration tax that was passed by voters in November 2014. Sawant and Licata unsuccessfully attempted to use the head tax to fund a second transportation levy, which instead relied on a property tax, and later to fund a municipal broadband service, which was rejected for further consideration. In 2018, the City Council passed a version of the head tax that would raise an estimate $47 million per year and would be used to build affordable housing and subsidize additional homeless shelter beds. Shortly after enacting the tax, the city council voted 7–2 to repeal it, with Sawant being one of the two dissenters.

Sawant referred to Seattle landlord Carl Haglund as a "notorious slumlord" and proposed a "Carl Haglund law" in 2015 which would ban landlords from raising rents on housing units that do not meet basic maintenance standards. In 2016, the Seattle City Council passed the bill into law. In 2017, Haglund filed a lawsuit against the City of Seattle for defamation, seeking $25 million in damages, a retraction of "derogatory comments," and a resolution apologizing to him. Haglund subsequently filed suit against Sawant personally saying that she slandered him. After a judge dismissed four of Haglund's nine claims, Haglund dropped the remaining ones. The City of Seattle spent about $250,000 defending against the lawsuits.

In August 2017, two Seattle Police Department (SPD) officers sued Sawant, claiming she defamed them by calling them murderers after they shot and killed Che Taylor. At a February 2016 rally, she said that Taylor's death was a "blatant murder at the hands of the police" and an example of "racial profiling." Council President Bruce Harrell wrote in a Seattle Times article that the city would pay for legal representation in her defense stating, "Councilmember Sawant was engaged in communication that was a clear extension of her office." Over seven years, the case would bounce back and forth between the district and appeals court until 2024, when the United States Court of Appeals for the Ninth Circuit reaffirmed the dismissal.

During the 2014 Israel–Gaza conflict, Sawant urged the Seattle City Council to condemn both Israel's attacks on Gaza and Hamas's attacks on Israel, and called on President Obama and Congress to denounce the Israeli blockade of Gaza and to cut off all military assistance to Israel. Sawant's call to condemn Israel's actions prompted a response from Israeli ambassador Ron Dermer, calling for Sawant to retract the statement. In 2021, Sawant sponsored a bill that would have prohibited the city of Seattle's police department from conducting training with the Israeli Defense Forces. The bill, which was defeated by a vote of 5-4 at the Seattle city council’s meeting. The bill proposal caused some controversy as certain local groups accused the bill of being antisemitic, including the Seattle Jewish Federation, as well as the Anti-Defamation League. The bill was supported by Jewish Voice for Peace. In 2023, Sawant penned a letter to Seattle city council calling for an immediate ceasefire in Gaza and an end to United States funding for the Israeli military.

In 2015 and 2018, multiple complaints were lodged against Sawant over potential misuse of city resources for a town hall (2015) and rally (2018) by anonymous reporters and council member Sally Bagshaw. In a May 2018 council briefing, Bagshaw stated, "I just don't think it is right for us to be using city resources or the copy machines to promote something that not all of us agree to." Sawant responded by saying, "I strongly believe that council resources should absolutely be used to build social movements and not for furthering the interests of the Chamber of Commerce." In both instances, Sawant was found to have not violated any ethics codes by the Seattle Ethics and Elections Commission.

In 2020, Sawant advocated for defunding the Seattle Police Department (SPD) by 50%, aligning with the broader "defund the police" movement. The city council made only smaller cuts to the police budget, for which Sawant did not vote in favor of and accused her colleagues of backing off their commitments. In 2023, after a drive-by shooting hit a daycare, Sawant said she did not support an increase in police resources to her district. Elected leaders and community members accused Sawant of not visiting the daycare and for not working to address public safety concerns in the district.

In February 2020, an ethics complaint was lodged against Sawant for using public resources in support of the "Tax Amazon" ballot initiative that she started. In response to the complaint, Sawant wrote, "It's shameful that while big business has license to run amok trying to bully or buy politicians...working people have to follow the most onerous of restrictions." In 2021, Sawant would settle the ethics complaint by paying $3,516 to the city, twice the amount spent to promote the campaign. In a written statement, Sawant stated, "So I have signed the SEEC's settlement which acknowledges fault in this matter, and will apply this interpretation of the ethics code going forward."

In a letter to the Council president on June 30, 2020, Durkan asked the City Council to investigate Sawant under its city charter authority to punish members for "disorderly or otherwise contemptuous behavior," writing that Sawant had participated in a march to her home, knowing that her address "was protected under the state confidentiality program because of threats against me due largely to my work as U.S. Attorney". The mayor accused Sawant and others of acting "with reckless disregard of the safety of my family and children." Additionally, Sawant led protesters into Seattle City Hall, which was closed to the public due to the coronavirus pandemic, on the evening of June 9, 2020.

Durkan also alleged that Sawant had used her council office to promote the "Tax Amazon" ballot initiative, urged protesters to occupy the East Precinct police station, and involved Socialist Alternative in her council office staffing decisions. Durkan said that she respected policy disagreements with members but that these disagreements "do not justify a council member who potentially uses their position in violation of law or who recklessly undermines the safety of others, all for political theatre." In response, Sawant accused Durkan of being the leader of a "pro-corporate political establishment" and of carrying out "an attack on working people's movements."

In July 2020, council president Lorena González declined to investigate Sawant, saying she wanted the council to focus on other work.

== 2026 congressional campaign ==
On June 2, 2025, Sawant announced that she would run in 2026 as an independent for the U.S. House of Representatives in Washington's 9th congressional district, challenging Democratic incumbent Adam Smith. In the primary, she finished 3rd with 17.3% of the vote, and failed to qualify to the general election.

== Political positions ==
Sawant has advocated the nationalization of large Washington State corporations such as Boeing, Microsoft, and Amazon and expressed a desire to see privately owned housing in "Millionaire's Row" in the Capitol Hill neighborhood turned into publicly owned shared housing complex saying, "When things are exquisitely beautiful and rare, they shouldn't be privately owned." During an election victory rally for her City Council campaign, Sawant criticized Boeing for saying it would move jobs out of state if it could not get wage concessions and tax breaks. She called this "economic terrorism" and said in several speeches that if the company moved jobs out of state, the workers should take over its facilities and bring them into public ownership. She has said they could be converted into multiple uses, such as production for buses. Sawant maintains that a socialist economy cannot exist in a single country and must be a global system just as capitalism today is a global system.

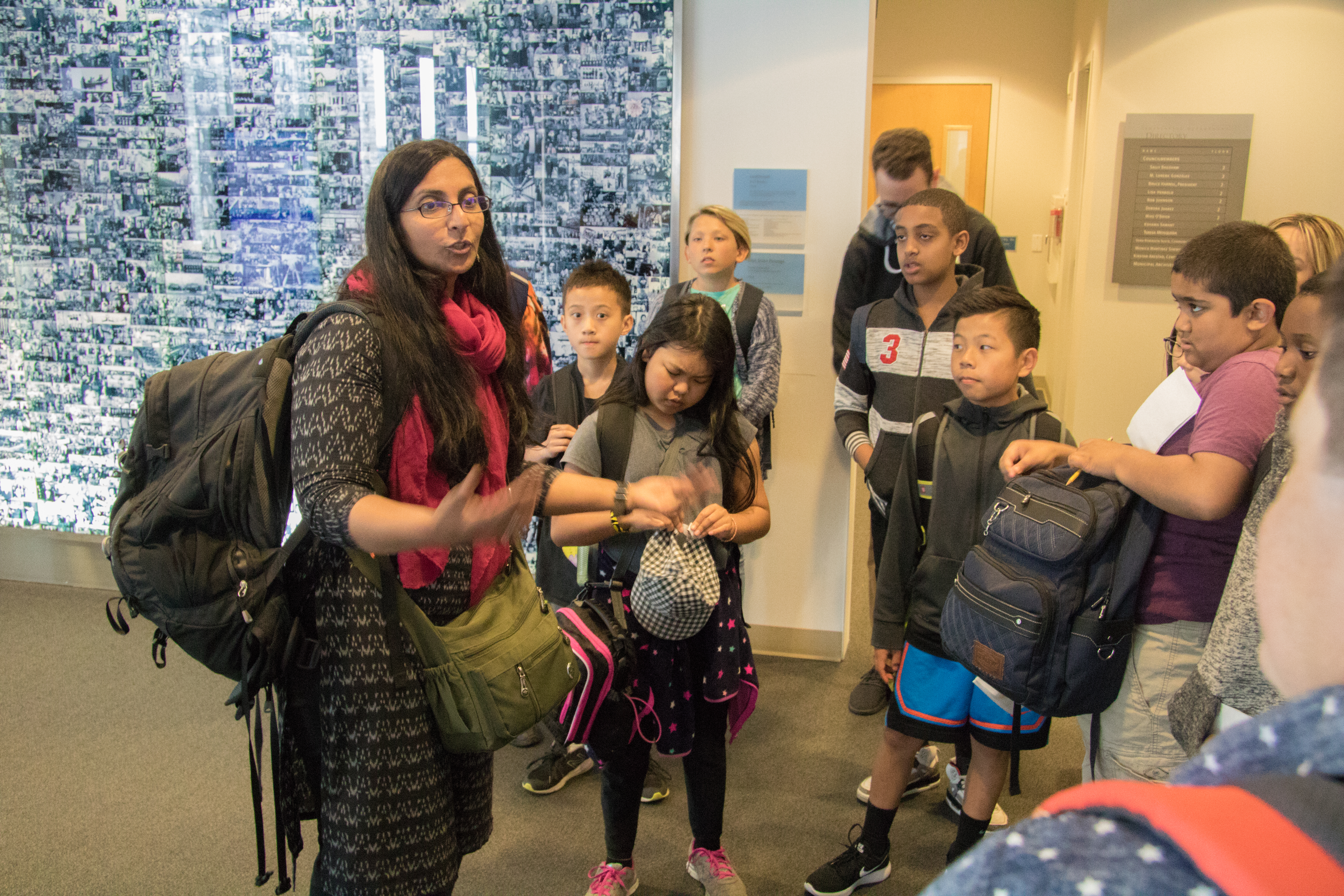
Sawant greeting students that are touring Seattle City Hall

Sawant opposed the construction of the Alaskan Way Viaduct replacement tunnel calling it "environmentally destructive" and "something most people were against, most environmental groups were against".

She opposed the Seattle Public Schools Measures of Academic Progress test in public schools, and supported the teachers' boycott of the standardized tests. Sawant has called for a revolt against student debt saying that "the laws of the rich are unenforceable if the working class refuses to obey those laws". She is an active member of the American Federation of Teachers union and has been critical of American labor union leadership, saying the leadership, "in the last 30 years has completely betrayed the working class. They are hand in glove with the Democratic Party, pouring hundreds of thousands of dollars into their campaigns, and they tell rank and file workers that you have to be happy with these crumbs". Sawant believes the American Labor movement should break with the Democratic Party and run grassroots left-wing candidates.

Sawant advocates for a moratorium on deportations of undocumented immigrants from Seattle and granting unconditional citizenship for all persons currently in the United States without citizenship. She opposes the E-Verify system.

=== Political ideology ===
Sawant is a member of Revolutionary Workers. Previously she was a member of Socialist Alternative, the United States section of the Trotskyist international organization the International Socialist Alternative, formerly the Committee for a Workers' International (CWI).

Sawant said she rejects working with either the Democratic or the Republican party and advocates abandoning the two-party system. She has called for "a movement to break the undemocratic power of big business and build a society that works for working people, not corporate profits—a democratic socialist society." In 2013, Sawant urged other left-wing groups, including Greens and trade unions, "to use her campaign as a model to inspire a much broader movement".

On February 20, 2019, she published an article in Socialist Alternative backing Bernie Sanders' run for the Democratic nomination. In 2020, she spoke at a campaign rally for him at the Tacoma Dome in Tacoma, Washington. She joined the Democratic Socialists of America in February 2021. However, the Seattle chapter of the DSA voted 91 to 67 against allowing her 2026 congressional campaign to seek a DSA endorsement.

In 2024, Kshama Sawant's organization, Workers Strike Back, endorsed Jill Stein, the Green Party candidate for the United States presidential election. The announcement occurred during the inaugural Workers Strike Back conference, where Sawant emphasized the importance of building an independent, left-wing alternative to the two-party system in the U.S. Sawant praised Stein's campaign for its anti-war stance, focus on workers' rights, and opposition to corporate influence in politics.

=== Occupy movement ===
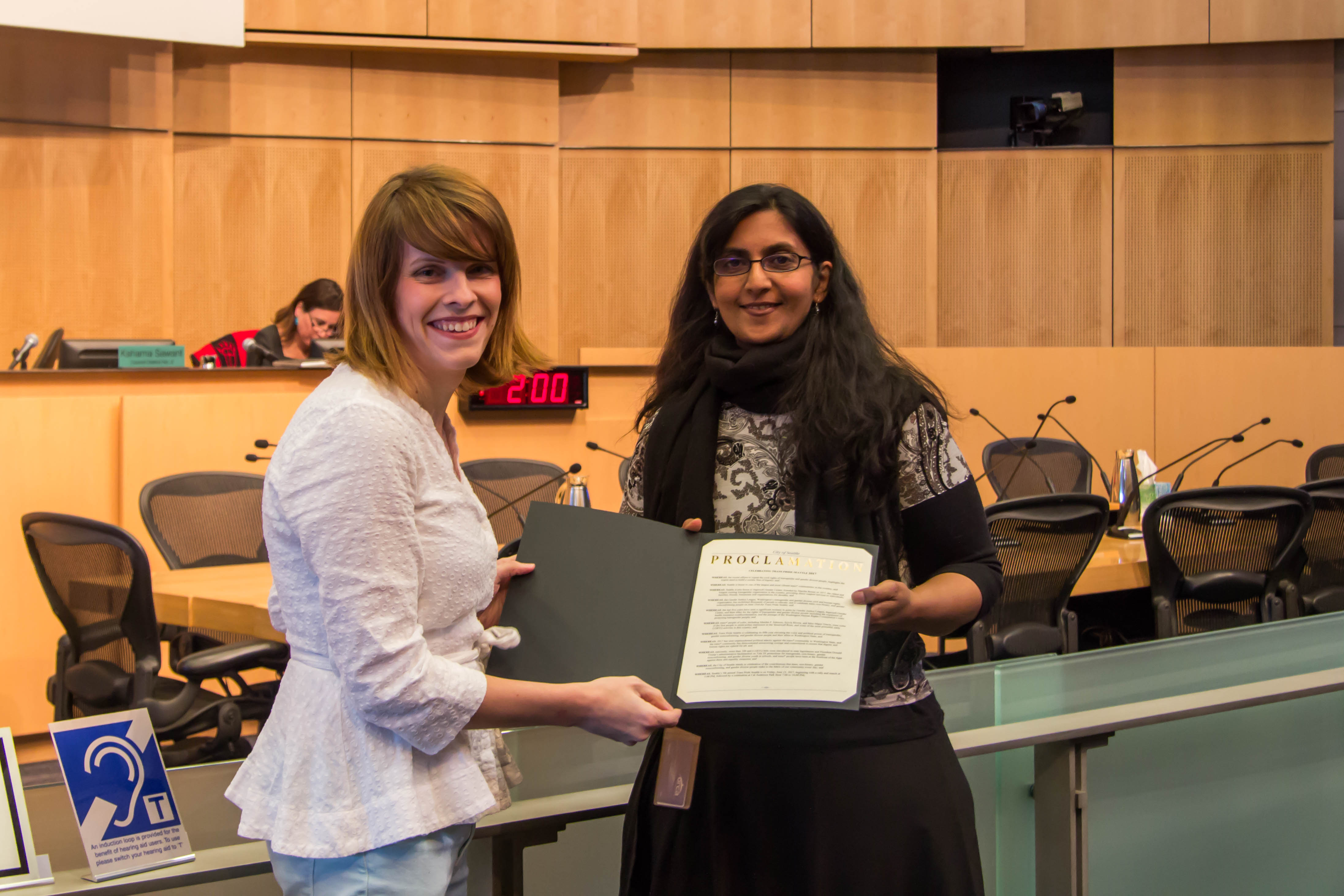
Sawant at Transgender Pride Day Proclamation

Before running for office, Sawant received attention as an organizer in the local Occupy movement of 2011-2012. She praised Occupy for putting "class," "capitalism," and "socialism" into the political debate. After Occupy Seattle protesters were removed from Westlake Park by order of Seattle Mayor Michael McGinn, Sawant helped bring them to the Capitol Hill campus of Seattle Central Community College, where they remained for two months. She joined with Occupy activists working with local organizations to resist home evictions and foreclosures, and was arrested with several Occupy activists including Dorli Rainey on July 31, 2012, for blocking King County Sheriff's deputies from evicting a man from his home.

In 2012, the Sawant state campaign criticized the raiding of Occupy Wall Street activists' homes by the Seattle Police Department's SWAT team. She also advocated on LGBT, women's, and people of color issues, and opposed cuts to education and other social programs. She gave a teach-in course at an all-night course at Seattle Central Community College.

=== Civil disobedience ===
On November 19, 2014, Sawant was arrested on a charge of disorderly conduct at a $15 minimum wage protest in SeaTac, Washington. She was released on $500 bail. On May 1, 2015, a SeaTac municipal court judge dismissed charges against her. The judge determined that testimony provided by police demonstrated that it was technically the police themselves, not protesters, who had blocked traffic.

In a February 2017 article in the socialist magazine Jacobin, Sawant called for a "wave of protests and strikes" on May Day, including "workplace actions as well a mass peaceful civil disobedience that shuts down highways, airports, and other key infrastructure". Her statement was controversial: Seattle Mayor Ed Murray said that it was "unfortunate and perhaps even tragic for an elected official to encourage people to confront and engage in confrontations with the police department" and the Washington State Patrol called the writings "irresponsible" and "reckless".

Following a June 20 shooting in the zone that left one man dead and another critically wounded, Sawant alleged that there were "indications that this may have been a right-wing attack," for which President Trump would bear "direct responsibility, since he has fomented reactionary hatred specifically against the peaceful Capitol Hill occupation" Two days later, The Seattle Times reported, Sawant "walked back her unfounded claim that the shooting 'may have been a right-wing attack.' She now says that appears to be incorrect".

== Personal life ==
Sawant is often reticent about her personal life and background, preferring to stick to political issues. She has said that her entire family remains in India with her mother currently residing in Bangalore. During her 2013 campaign for the Seattle City Council, she indicated that she and her husband Vivek Sawant, had been separated for nearly six years. In 2014, Sawant and Calvin Priest, a Seattle Socialist Alternative organizer, purchased a home together in the Leschi neighborhood. In 2016, Sawant took time off to be out of the country for their wedding.

In February 2025, Sawant's application for an entry visa to see her mother in India was denied for a third time. Sawant said she was told she was on a "reject list". Sawant protested the denial by staging a sit-in at the Indian Consulate in Seattle which led to a confrontation with staff.

== Electoral history ==
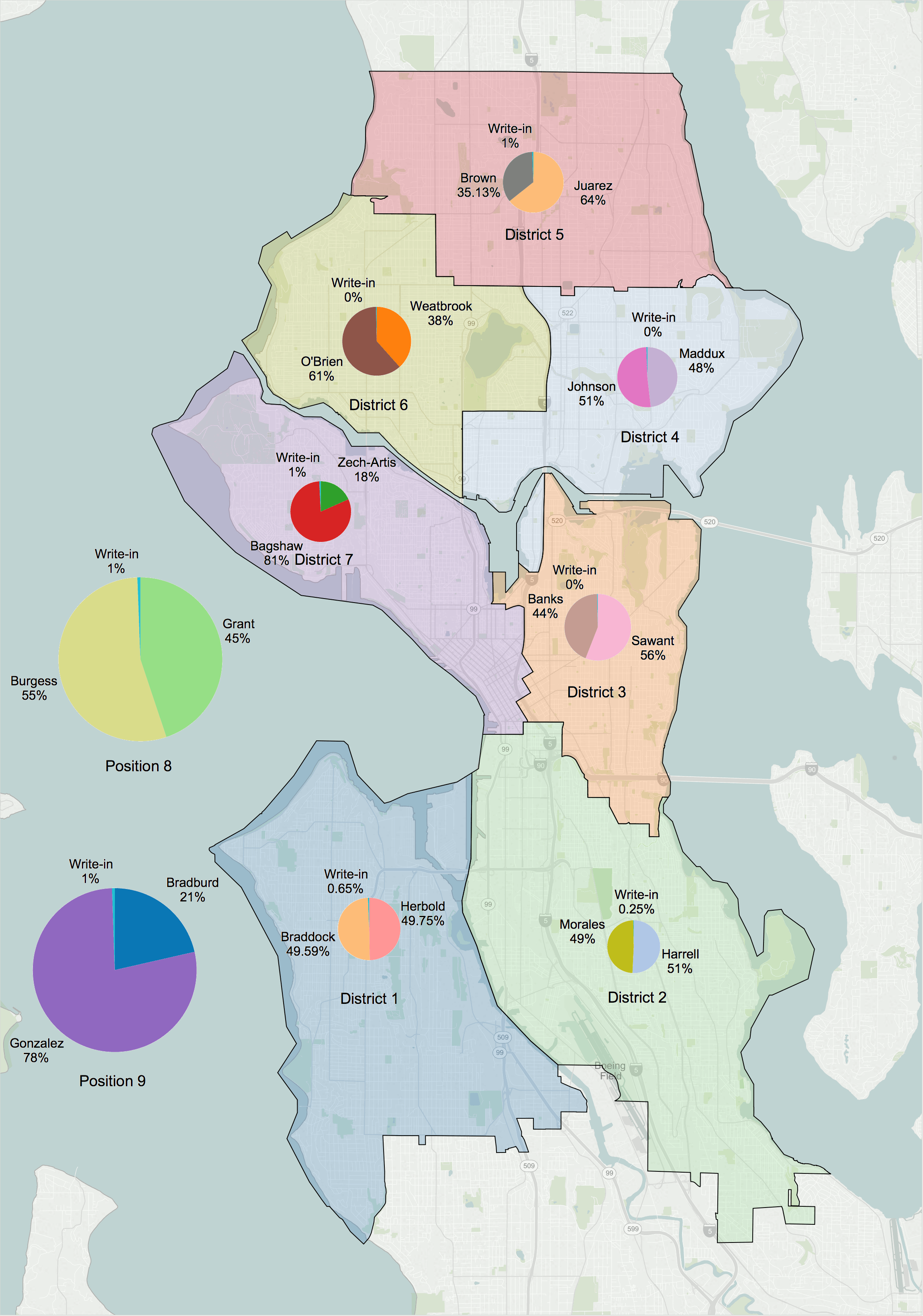
Graph of the 2015 City Council election, with size of circle showing number of votes cast and angle of pies showing percentage in each race.

Washington House of Representatives, District 43b, General Election, 2012
| Party | Candidate | Votes | % |
|---|---|---|---|
| Democratic | Frank Chopp | 49,125 | 70.6% |
| Socialist Alternative | Kshama Sawant | 20,425 | 29.4% |
| Majority | | 28,700 | |
| Turnout | | 69,550 | |

2013 Seattle City Council Position 2 primary election
| Candidate | Votes | % |
|---|---|---|
| Richard Conlin | 60,537 | 47.74% |
| Kshama Sawant | 44,458 | 35.06% |
| Brian Carver | 21,107 | 16.64% |
| Write-ins | 712 | 0.56% |
| Majority | 16,079 | |
| Turnout | 126,102 | 30.54% |

2013 Seattle City Council Position 2 general election
| Candidate | Votes | % |
|---|---|---|
| Kshama Sawant | 93,682 | 50.67% |
| Richard Conlin | 90,531 | 48.97% |
| Write-ins | 665 | 0.36% |
| Majority | 3,151 | |
| Turnout | 184,878 | 45.00% |

City of Seattle, City Council, District 3, 2015
| Candidate | Votes | % | |
|---|---|---|---|
| Nonpartisan | Kshama Sawant | 17,170 | 56.0% |
| Nonpartisan | Pamela Banks | 13,427 | 43.8% |
| Write-in | 87 | 0.3% | |
| Majority | | 3,743 | |
| Turnout | | 31,613 | |

City of Seattle, City Council, District 3, 2019
| Party | Candidate | Votes | % |
|---|---|---|---|
| Nonpartisan | Kshama Sawant | 22,263 | 51.8% |
| Nonpartisan | Egan Orion | 20,488 | 47.7% |
| Nonpartisan | Write-ins | 205 | 0.5% |
| Majority | | 1,775 | |
| Turnout | | 42,956 | |

December 7, 2021 Recall Election of Kshama Sawant
| Party | Candidate | Votes | % |
|---|---|---|---|
| Nonpartisan | NO | 20,656 | 50.38% |
| Nonpartisan | YES | 20,346 | 49.62% |
| Majority | | 310 | |
| Turnout | | 41,033 | 52.9 |

August 4, 2026 District 9 Primary results
| Party | Candidate | Votes | % |
|---|---|---|---|
| Democratic | Adam Smith (incumbent) | 67,095 | 47.13 |
| Republican | Doug Basler | 31,070 | 21.83 |
| Independent Party (Note: Not an actual political party. In Washington, independent candidates are allowed to choose a ballot label.) | Kshama Sawant | 24,583 | 17.27 |
| Democratic | Melissa Chaudhry | 17,811 | 12.51 |
| Socialist Workers | Jacob Perasso | 1,588 | 1.12 |
| | Write-in | 209 | 0.15 |
| Total votes | | 142,356 | 100.0 |
