= Richard Conlin =

American politician

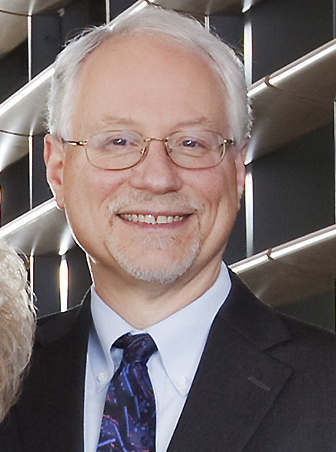
- Richard Conlin, 2013

Member of the Seattle City Council for Position 2
- In office January 1, 1998 – January 1, 2014
- Preceded by: Jane Noland
- Succeeded by: Kshama Sawant

President of the Seattle City Council
- In office January 3, 2008 – January 3, 2012
- Preceded by: Nick Licata
- Succeeded by: Sally J. Clark

Personal details
- Born: May 1, 1948 (age 78) Washington, D.C., United States
- Party: Democratic
- Spouse: Sue Ann Allen
- Children: 3
- Education: Michigan State University (BA, MA)

Richard Conlin (born May 1, 1948) is a former member of the Seattle City Council, first elected to council in 1997 and serving until his 2013 reelection loss to Kshama Sawant of Socialist Alternative. He was unanimously elected council president twice, serving from 2008–2012.

== Early life and education ==
Conlin is a native of Washington, D.C. He moved to Michigan for college and received a B.A. in history from Michigan State University (1968), as well as a master's degree in Political Science (1971). After college, Conlin took a job selling computer programs. He was elected to two terms (1973–1976) as an Ingham County Commissioner, representing part of the City of East Lansing.

Before being elected to Seattle City Council, Conlin directed the Community and Environment Division at Metrocenter YMCA from 1985 to 1996, where started the Earth Service Corps, expanded the Master Home Environmentalist certification (aimed at household waste and pollution) and co-founded the policy group Sustainable Seattle.

Conlin spent time teaching public administration at the University of Botswana and University of Swaziland.

== Seattle City Council ==
=== Elections ===
Conlin first ran for the Seattle City Council in 1997 after councilmember Jane Noland chose to run for mayor instead of reelection. In the September primary, Conlin came in first among seven challengers, with 30% of the vote, and advanced to the general election with former councilmember Sherry Harris, who earned 28% of the vote. Harris received endorsements from a majority of the council while Conlin only received an endorsement from Mayor Norm Rice after the primary. Although heterosexual, Conlin received endorsements from LGBT politicians and organizations over Harris, who was a lesbian. In the November general election, Conlin defeated Harris in a landslide, 66% to 34%.

Conlin ran for reelection in 2001 and, in the September primary, came in first against four challengers, with 46% of the vote. He advanced to the general election with Seattle School Board member Michael Preston who earned 23% of the vote in the primary. Conlin ran on his record as chair of the neighborhoods committee, and outraised and received more endorsements then Preston. In the November general election, Conlin defeat Preston 62% to 38%.

Conlin ran for reelection in 2005, facing two primary challengers, Paige Miller, a Seattle Port Commissioner, and Darlene Madenwald, President of the American Lung Association of Washington. in the September primary, Conlin and Miller advanced with 49% and 36% of the vote, respectively. In the general election, Conlin focused on his record as transportation chair while Miller accused Conlin of flip-flopping on transportation issues, like the Waterfront Streetcar and the Alaska Way Viaduct replacement. In the November general election, Conlin defeated Miller 60% to 40%.

In 2009, Conlin faced one challenger, David Ginsberg, a technology “solutions architect" at a bank. In the November general election, Conlin defeated Ginsberg in a landslide, 77% to 23%.

In his 2013 reelection campaign, Conlin faced two challengers and secured first place in the August primary, receiving 47% of the vote. Kshama Sawant, an economics professor at Seattle Central College and member of the Socialist Alternative party, came in second, with 35% of the vote, and also advanced to the general election. Conlin focused his campaign on his record, which included rezoning the South Lake Union neighborhood and passing a $123 million housing levy, and high-profile endorsements, like the King County Labor Council. Sawant campaigned on raising the minimum wage and against the capitalist systems. In the November general election, Sawant narrowly defeated Conlin, 50.8% to 49.1%.

=== Tenure ===
Over his tenure, Conlin chaired the Environment, Emergency Management & Utilities Committee, the Annexation Committee, Neighborhoods, Growth Planning, and Civic Engagement Committee, and the Planning, Land Use, and Sustainability. His focus areas were public health, sustainability, and the environment. Under the banner of environment, he was involved in efforts to improve the salmon population. Conlin was involved in emergency response planning for Seattle.

Conlin sponsored the 2007 Zero Waste Strategy, Resolution 30990 which directed Seattle Public Utilities to produce recommendations on how to eliminate residential solid waste, including whether to ban or tax plastic shopping bags and Styrofoam food containers. In 2008, Conlin sponsored a bill to phase out plastic bags in Seattle, a 20-cent surcharge on bags. Businesses with under one million dollars in annual sales were exempt and got to keep the money. The measure passed the city council by a 6-1 margin.

On August 8, 2008, Washington Food Industry, a trade group representing grocery stores, launched a petition drive to nullify the ordinance through citizens' referendum, funded partly by the plastics industry. On September 15, the petition was certified by the King County Elections Office, delaying implementation of the fee until after a public vote. On August 18, 2009, Seattle voters rejected the fee, 53 to 47 percent. A new plastic bag ban and paper bag fee passed in 2011.

On October 15, 2012, both the King County Council and Seattle City Council approved a financing plan for a $490 million sports arena in Seattle's Sodo neighborhood, backed by venture capitalist Chris Hansen. The King County Council vote was 9–0, while the City Council vote was 7–2, with Conlin and Nick Licata as the only opposition. The new arena was intended to host the NBA Seattle SuperSonics professional basketball team as well as a potential NHL ice hockey team.

=== Recall effort ===
On May 31, 2011, a recall effort was announced. Proponents cited Conlin for three alleged violations of law: signing the draft environmental-impact statement of the proposed Seattle waterfront tunnel in lieu of Mayor Mike McGinn, colluding with City Attorney Peter Holmes, and failing to place a certified initiative on the ballot. On July 22, 2011, King County Superior Court Judge Carol Schapira dismissed the recall petition, which would have required proving Conlin committed malfeasance or an illegal act to go forward.

== Post-City Council Career ==
After serving on the council, Conlin became an affordable housing developer at Conlin Columbia LLC. Conlin also teaches urban planning at the University of Washington.
