= 2025 Seattle City Council election =

Washington state local election

- November 4, 2025; Officially nonpartisan

3 of the 9 seats on the Seattle City Council 5 seats needed for a majority
	Majority party
Party	Democratic
Seats before	9
President of the City Council before election
Sara Nelson
Nonpartisan
Elected President of the City Council
Joy Hollingsworth
Nonpartisan

The 2025 Seattle City Council election was held on November 4, 2025, following a primary election on August 5. Three seats on the City Council were up for election; two regularly scheduled at-large district elections and one special election for the 2nd district. The 2nd district seat was vacated by Tammy Morales on January 6, citing friction with other councilmembers.

== District 2 ==
District 2 (special)
- November 4, 2025
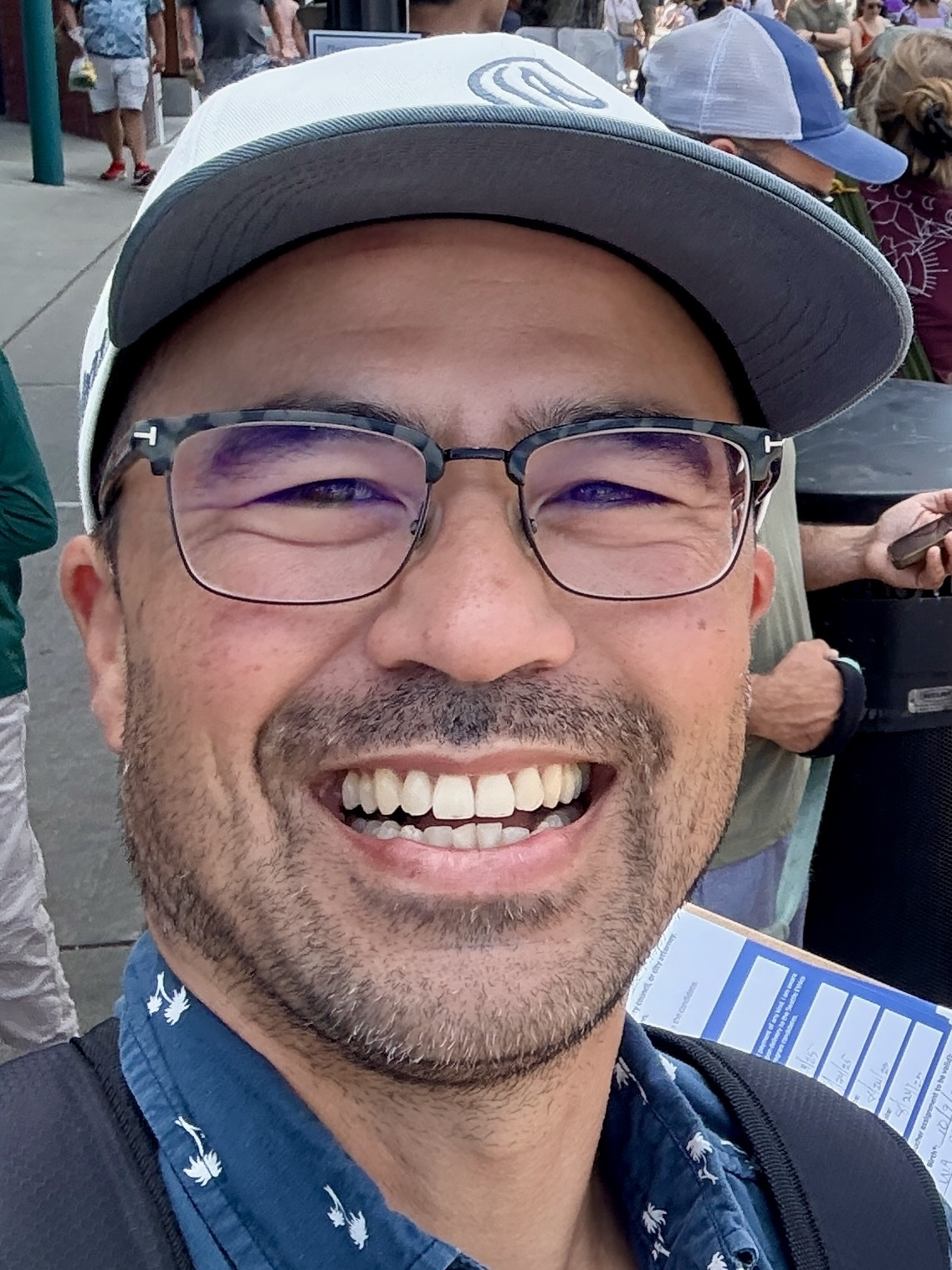

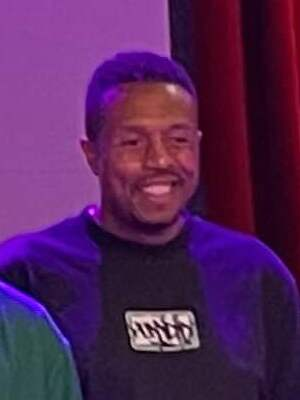
Candidate	Eddie Lin	Adonis Ducksworth
Popular vote	21,775	9,976
Percentage	68.40%	31.34%
Councilor before election
Mark Solomon
Democratic
Elected Councilor
Eddie Lin

=== Campaign ===
Mark Solomon was appointed to the 2nd district seat in January 2025 following the resignation of Tammy Morales earlier that month. Solomon had previously ran against Morales during the 2019 election. Solomon decided to not run in the special election for the remainder of the term.

=== Endorsements ===
Jeanie Chunn

Organizations

- Working Families Party
Adonis Ducksworth

Local officials

- Joy Hollingsworth, Seattle city councilmember from the 3rd district (2024–present)
- Robert Kettle, Seattle city councilmember from the 7th district (2024–present)
- Mark Solomon, Seattle city councilmember from the 2nd district (2025–present)
- Dan Strauss, Seattle city councilmember from the 6th district (2020–present)

Labor unions

- Amalgamated Transit Union Local 587
- International Brotherhood of Teamsters Local 117
- Iron Workers Local 86
- Seattle Building and Construction Trades

Newspapers

- The Seattle Times
Jamie Fackler

Local officials

- Larry Gossett, former chair of the King County Council (2007–2008, 2013–2014) from the 2nd district (1994–2020)
- Tammy Morales, former Seattle city councilmember from the 2nd district (2020–2025)
- Teresa Mosqueda, King County Councilor from the 8th district (2024–present)

Democratic party organizations

- King County Democrats
- Washington's 37th legislative district Democrats

Labor unions

- American Federation of Teachers Washington
- King County Labor Council
- United Auto Workers Local 4121
Eddie Lin

State legislators

- Emily Alvarado, state senator from the 34th district (2025–present)

Individuals

- Sharon Maeda, activist

Newspapers

- The Stranger
- The Urbanist

=== Primary election results ===
2025 Seattle City Council 2nd district special primary election
Candidate	Votes	%
Eddie Lin	11,205	47.40%
Adonis Ducksworth	6,941	29.36%
Jeanie Chunn	2,992	12.66%
Jamie Fackler	2,397	10.14%
Write-in	106	0.45%
Total votes	23,641	100.00%

=== General election debate ===
2025 Seattle City Council District 2 general election debate
No.	Date	Host	Moderator	Nonpartisan	Nonpartisan
Key: P Participant A Absent N Not invited I Invited W Withdrawn					
Key: P Participant A Absent N Not invited I Invited W Withdrawn				Eddie Lin	Adonis Ducksworth
1	Sep. 16, 2025	Rainier Avenue Radio	Pela Terry; Tanya Woo	P	P
2		Seattle Channel	Brian Callanan	P	P

=== General election results ===
2025 Seattle City Council 2nd district special general election
Candidate	Votes	%
Eddie Lin	21,775	68.40%
Adonis Ducksworth	9,976	31.34%
Write-in	83	0.26%
Total votes	31,834	100.00%

== Position 8 ==
Position 8
- November 4, 2025

Candidate	Alexis Mercedes Rinck	Rachael Savage
Popular vote	207,892	46,266
Percentage	81.41%	18.12%
Councilor before election
Alexis Mercedes Rinck
Democratic
Elected Councilor
Alexis Mercedes Rinck
Democratic

=== Campaign ===
Alexis Mercedes Rinck ran for a full term on the Seattle City Council following her election in the special election in 2024. She faced 4 challengers in the primary. Position 8 is an at-large district for the City of Seattle.

=== Endorsements ===
Alexis Mercedes Rinck

Democratic party organizations

- King County Democrats
- Washington's 32nd legislative district Democrats
- Washington's 34th legislative district Democrats
- Washington's 36th legislative district Democrats
- Washington's 37th legislative district Democrats
- Washington's 43rd legislative district Democrats
- Washington's 46th legislative district Democrats

Organizations

- National Women's Political Caucus of Washington
- Planned Parenthood Action Fund

Labor unions

- King County Labor Council
- SEIU Local 775
- United Auto Workers Local 4121
- United Food and Commercial Workers Local 3000

Newspapers

- The Daily of the University of Washington
- The Stranger
- The Urbanist
Declined to endorse

Newspapers

- The Seattle Times

=== Primary election polling ===
Poll source	Date(s) administered	Sample size (Note: Key: A – all adults RV – registered voters LV – likely voters V – unclear)	Margin of error	Alexis Mercedes Rinck	Rachael Savage	Other	Undecided
Change Research (D) (Note: This poll was sponsored by the Northwest Progressive Institute)	July 23–25, 2025	651 (LV)	± 4.1%	34%	4%	2% (Note: Hall and Rogers with 1%; Jones with 0%)	59%
Change Research (D)	July 23–25, 2025	651 (LV)	± 4.1%	37% (Note: With voters who lean towards a given candidate)	4%	12% (Note: "Would not vote" with 8%; Rogers with 2%; Hall and Jones with 1%)	48%

=== General election polling ===
Poll source	Date(s) administered	Sample size	Margin of error	Alexis Mercedes Rinck	Rachael Savage	Undecided
DHM Research (Note: This poll was sponsored by The Stranger)	October 6–13, 2025	400 (LV)	± 4.0%	43%	7%	50%

=== Primary election results ===
2025 Seattle City Council 8th district primary election
Candidate	Votes	%
Alexis Mercedes Rinck (incumbent)	142,537	78.29%
Rachael Savage	23,609	12.97%
Ray A. Rogers	8,138	4.47%
Jesse A. James	4,339	2.38%
Cooper Hall	2,306	1.27%
Write-in	1,139	0.63%
Total votes	182,066	100.00%

=== General election results ===
2025 Seattle City Council 8th district general election
Candidate	Votes	%
Alexis Mercedes Rinck (incumbent)	207,892	81.41%
Rachael Savage	46,266	18.12%
Write-in	1,214	0.48%
Total votes	255,372	100.00%

== Position 9 ==
Position 9
- November 4, 2025
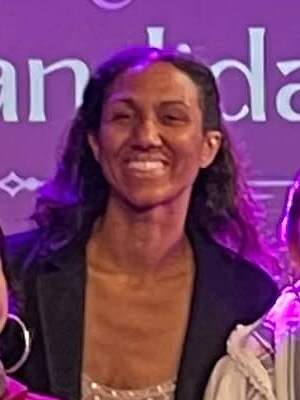

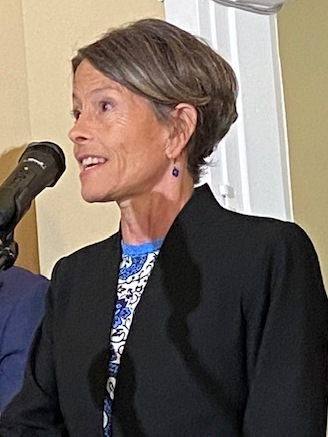
Candidate	Dionne Foster	Sara Nelson
Popular vote	165,930	97,710
Percentage	62.80%	36.98%
Councilor before election
Sara Nelson
Democratic
Elected Councilor
Dionne Foster

=== Campaign ===
Sara Nelson was first elected to the Seattle City Council for a full term in the 2021 election. She is currently serving as the Council President since her nomination in 2024. She faced 3 challengers in the primary. Position 9 is an at-large district for the City of Seattle.

=== Endorsements ===
Dionne Foster

Democratic party organizations

- King County Democrats
- Washington's 32nd legislative district Democrats
- Washington's 34th legislative district Democrats
- Washington's 36th legislative district Democrats
- Washington's 37th legislative district Democrats
- Washington's 43rd legislative district Democrats
- Washington's 46th legislative district Democrats

Organizations

- National Women's Political Caucus of Washington
- Planned Parenthood Action Fund

Labor unions

- King County Labor Council
- SEIU Local 775
- United Auto Workers Local 4121
- United Food and Commercial Workers Local 3000

Newspapers

- The Daily of the University of Washington
- The Stranger
- The Urbanist
Sara Nelson

Newspapers

- The Seattle Times

=== Primary election polling ===
Poll source	Date(s) administered	Sample size	Margin of error	Dionne Foster	Sara Nelson	Other	Undecided
Change Research (D)	July 23–25, 2025	651 (LV)	± 4.1%	20%	25%	2% (Note: Jacobson and Nash with 1%)	54%
Change Research (D)	July 23–25, 2025	651 (LV)	± 4.1%	22%	27%	8% (Note: "Would not vote" with 6%; Jacobson and Nash with 1%)	43%

=== General election polling ===
Poll source	Date(s) administered	Sample size	Margin of error	Dionne Foster	Sara Nelson	Other	Undecided
Change Research (D)	October 19–23, 2025	615 (LV)	± 4.0%	43%	27%	–	30%
Change Research (D)	October 19–23, 2025	615 (LV)	± 4.0%	44%	29%	5% (Note: "Would not vote" with 5%)	22%
DHM Research	October 6–13, 2025	400 (LV)	± 4.0%	33%	24%	–	43%

=== Primary election results ===
2025 Seattle City Council 9th district primary election
Candidate	Votes	%
Dionne Foster	110,636	58.44%
Sara Nelson (incumbent)	66,909	35.34%
Mia Jacobson	5,845	3.09%
Connor Nash	5,532	2.92%
Write-in	393	0.21%
Total votes	189,315	100.00%

=== General election debate ===
2025 Seattle City Council District 2 general election debate
No.	Date	Host	Moderator	Nonpartisan	Nonpartisan
Key: P Participant A Absent N Not invited I Invited W Withdrawn					
Key: P Participant A Absent N Not invited I Invited W Withdrawn				Sara Nelson	Dionne Foster
1	Sep. 15, 2025	Rainier Avenue Radio; Urban League of Metropolitan Seattle	Jenna Beem; Juan Cotto	P	P
2		Seattle Channel	Brian Callanan	P	P

=== General election results ===
2025 Seattle City Council 9th district general election
Candidate	Votes	%
Dionne Foster	165,930	62.80%
Sara Nelson (incumbent)	97,710	36.98%
Write-in	579	0.22%
Total votes	264,219	100.00%

== See also ==
- 2025 Seattle City Attorney election
- 2025 Seattle mayoral election

== Notes ==
Partisan clients
