= 2025 Seattle mayoral election =

Washington state local election

- November 4, 2025
- Turnout: 55%
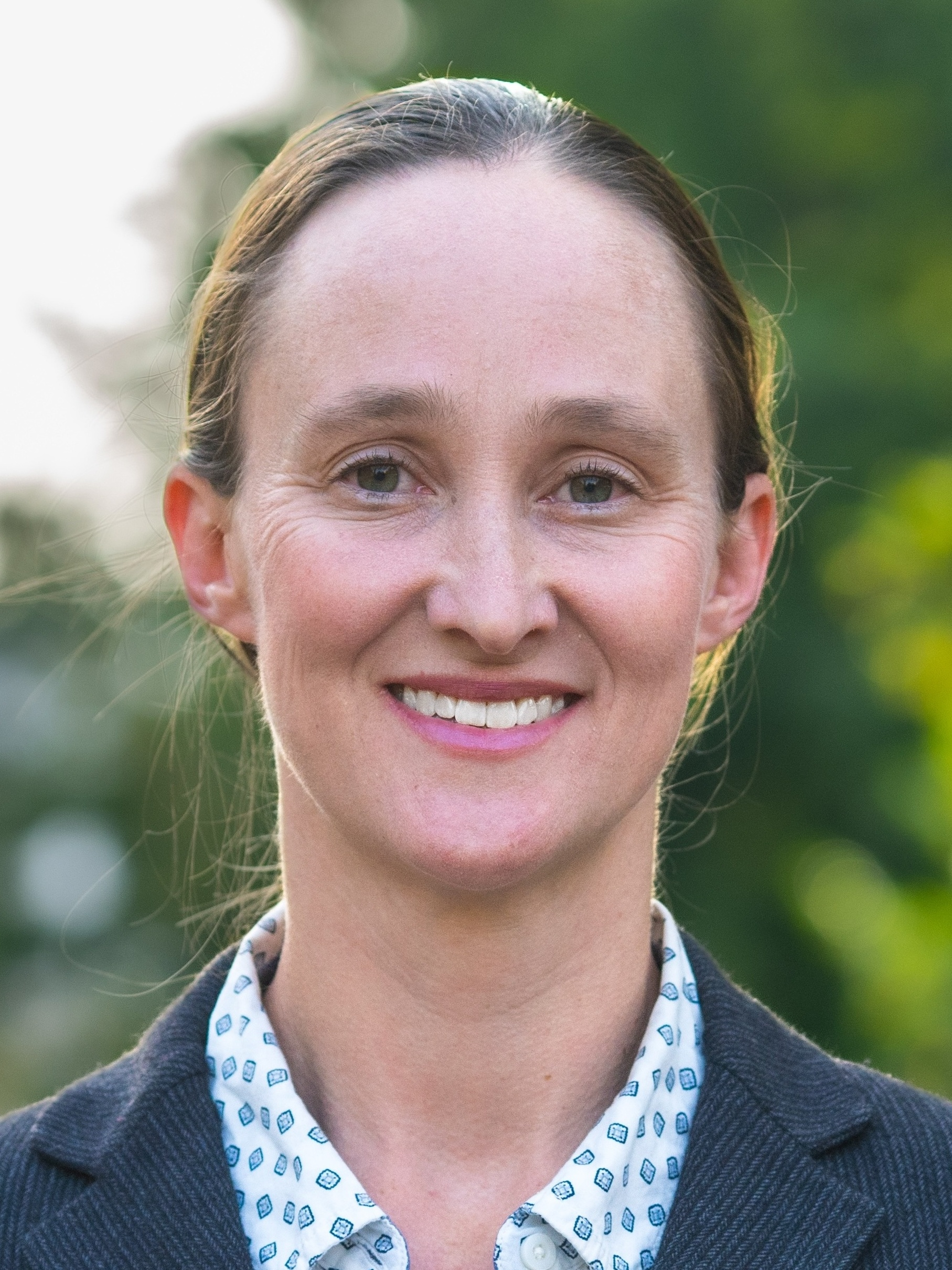

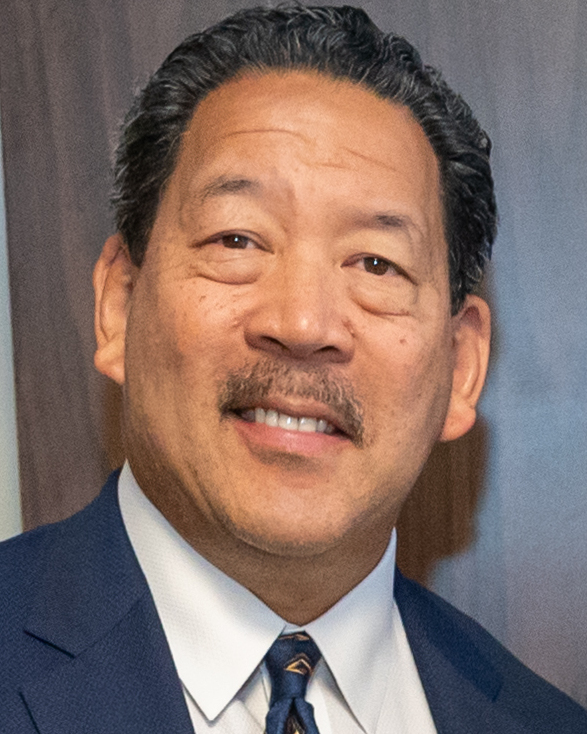
Candidate	Katie Wilson	Bruce Harrell
Popular vote	138,931	136,920
Percentage	50.20%	49.47%
- Wilson: 40–50% 50–60% 60–70% 70–80% 80–90% Harrell: 40–50% 50–60% 60–70% 70–80% 80–90% >90%
Mayor before election
Bruce Harrell
Democratic
Elected mayor
Katie Wilson
Democratic

The 2025 Seattle mayoral election was held on November 4, 2025, with a primary election on August 5, 2025, to elect the mayor of Seattle. Incumbent Mayor Bruce Harrell ran for re-election to a second term and was challenged by community organizer Katie Wilson, who placed first in the August nonpartisan primary.

The Seattle Times and other outlets called the election for Wilson a week after election day, with Harrell conceding to Wilson on November 13. Wilson ultimately won by a margin of 0.73%, the closest mayoral election in Seattle by percentage since 1906.

== Background ==
Harrell announced his campaign for a second term in December 2024, and entered the race with the endorsement of numerous Washington government officials. Harrell was initially considered to be heading to an easy re-election. If re-elected, Harrell would have become the first Seattle mayor elected to a second term since Greg Nickels in 2005.

In a February 2025 special election, Seattle voters passed Proposition 1A, which created a new business tax to fund social housing, over Proposition 1B, an alternative proposal endorsed by Harrell and business leaders that would have pulled funding for social housing from an existing tax. The result was widely considered to be a victory for Seattle's progressive wing, and a rebuke of Harrell heading into an election year.

Community organizer and activist Katie Wilson's entry into the race in March was considered to be a significant progressive challenge to Harrell. Wilson, the co-founder and general secretary of the Seattle Transit Riders Union and a former columnist for Cascade PBS, had led activist campaigns for expanded public transportation access, minimum wage increases, and tenant protections across the Seattle area. Wilson said the passage of Proposition 1A had inspired her campaign. As of the campaign filing deadline in May, Wilson was the second-highest fundraising candidate in the race, after Harrell. Another high-profile progressive challenger was actor Ry Armstrong, the only candidate other than Harrell and Wilson to raise more than $100,000 in funding by the campaign filing deadline in mid-May.

Around the May filing deadline, several additional candidates entered the race. Joe Mallahan, former T-Mobile US vice president and runner-up in the 2009 Seattle mayoral election, became another high-profile entrant. Mallahan lost to Mike McGinn by just 7,200 votes in 2009. Capitol Hill business owner Rachel Savage cited Mallahan's entry and wealth as her reason for bowing out of the race and running for Seattle City Council District 8 instead. Harrell would ultimately face seven primary challengers, including Wilson, Armstrong, and Mallahan.

== Primary election ==
=== Candidates ===
==== Advanced ====
- Bruce Harrell, incumbent mayor (2022–present) (party affiliation: Democratic)
- Katie Wilson, community organizer (party affiliation: Democratic)

==== Eliminated in primary ====
- Ry Armstrong, member of the Seattle LGBTQ Commission and candidate for city council in 2023 (party affiliation: Democratic)
- Clinton Bliss, doctor and candidate for mayor in 2021
- Joe Mallahan, former vice president at T-Mobile US and runner-up for mayor in 2009
- Joe Molloy, nonprofit board member
- Thaddeus Whelan, U.S. Army veteran
- Isaiah Willoughby, convicted felon and perennial candidate

==== Withdrawn ====
- Rachael Savage, business owner (party affiliation: Republican) (running for city council)

=== Endorsements ===
Ry Armstrong

Labor unions

- Communications Workers of America Local 7800

Organizations

- LGBTQ+ Victory Fund
- LPAC
- National Women's Political Caucus of Washington (co-endorsement with Wilson)
- Run for Something
- Young Democrats of King County and University of Washington

Newspapers

- Seattle Gay News
Bruce Harrell

Executive branch officials

- Jenny Durkan, former U.S. Attorney for the Western District of Washington (2009–2014) and former Mayor of Seattle (2017–2021)
- Gary Locke, former U.S. Ambassador to China (2011–2014) and former Governor of Washington (1997–2005)

U.S. Senators

- Maria Cantwell, U.S. Senator from Washington (2001–present)

U.S. Representatives

- Pramila Jayapal, WA-7 (2017–present)
- Marilyn Strickland, WA-10 (2021–present)

Statewide officials

- Nick Brown, Attorney General of Washington (2025–present)
- Christine Gregoire, former Governor of Washington (2005–2013)
- Bob Ferguson, Governor of Washington (2025–present)
- Jay Inslee, former Governor of Washington (2013–2025)

State legislators

- Lauren Davis, state representative, LD-32 (2019–present)
- David Hackney, state representative, LD-11 (2021–present)
- Joe Nguyen, state senator, LD-34 (2019–2025)
- Jamie Pedersen, majority leader of the Washington State Senate (2025–present), LD-43 (2013–present)
- Chipalo Street, state representative, LD-37 (2023–present)
- Sharon Tomiko Santos, state representative, LD-37 (1999–present)
- Javier Valdez, state senator, LD-46 (2023–present)

Local officials

- Tim Burgess, deputy mayor of Seattle (2023–present) and former acting Mayor of Seattle (2017)
- Dow Constantine, CEO of Sound Transit (2025–present) and former King County Executive (2009–2025)
- Teresa Mosqueda, King County Councilor from the 8th district (2024–present)
- Greg Nickels, former Mayor of Seattle (2002–2010)
- Norm Rice, former Mayor of Seattle (1990–1998)
- Wes Uhlman, former Mayor of Seattle (1969–1978)
- Victoria Woodards, Mayor of Tacoma (2018–present)

Individuals

- Maud Daudon, CEO of the Seattle Metropolitan Chamber of Commerce

Labor unions

- IAFF Local 27
- IBEW Local 77
- Teamsters Local 117
- King County Labor Council
- Seattle Building and Construction Trades
- SEIU Locals 6 and 775
- United Association Local 32

Organizations

- Seattle King County Association of Realtors

Newspapers

- Seattle Medium
- The Seattle Times
Katie Wilson

U.S. Representatives

- Jim McDermott, WA-7 (1989–2017)

State legislators

- Rebecca Saldaña, state senator, LD-37 (2016–present)

Local officials

- Tammy Morales, former Seattle city councilmember from the 2nd district (2020–2025)

Party chapters

- King County Democrats
- Washington's 32nd legislative district Democrats
- Washington's 34th legislative district Democrats
- Washington's 36th legislative district Democrats
- Washington's 37th legislative district Democrats
- Washington's 43rd legislative district Democrats
- Washington's 46th legislative district Democrats
- Washington State Stonewall Democrats

Labor unions

- AFSCME – Washington Local 1495
- AFT Washington
- IFPTE Local 17
- UAW Local 4121

Organizations

- Council on American-Islamic Relations Action
- Gen-Z for Change
- National Women's Political Caucus of Washington (co-endorsement with Armstrong)
- Sunrise Movement Seattle
- Working Families Party – National and Washington
- Young Democratic Socialists of America - University of Washington Chapter

Newspapers

- The Daily of the University of Washington
- The Stranger
- The Urbanist

=== Polling ===
Poll source	Date(s) administered	Sample size (Note: Key: A – all adults RV – registered voters LV – likely voters V – unclear)	Margin of error	Bruce Harrell	Joe Mallahan	Katie Wilson	Other	Undecided
Change Research (D) (Note: This poll was sponsored by the Northwest Progressive Institute)	July 23–25, 2025	651 (LV)	± 4.1%	29%	3%	27%	1% (Note: Bliss with 1%; Armstrong, Molloy, Whelan, and Willoughby with 0%)	24%
Change Research (D)	July 23–25, 2025	651 (LV)	± 4.1%	33% (Note: With voters who lean towards a given candidate)	3%	31%	3% (Note: "Would not vote" with 2%; Bliss with 1%; Armstrong, Molloy, Whelan, and Willoughby with 0%)	27%

=== Results ===
Nonpartisan primary results by precinct Wilson: 30–40%; 40–50%; 50–60%; 60–70%; 70–80%; 80–90%; Harrell: 30–40%; 40–50%; 50–60%; 60–70%; 70–80%; 80–90%; Whelan: 100%; Wilson-Harrell tie: 30–40%; 40–50%

Nonpartisan primary results
Candidate	Votes	%
Katie Wilson	98,562	50.75
Bruce Harrell (incumbent)	80,043	41.21
Joe Mallahan	8,538	4.40
Ry Armstrong	2,120	1.09
Clinton Bliss	2,046	1.05
Isaiah Willoughby	817	0.42
Joe Molloy	799	0.41
Thaddeus Whelan	716	0.37
Write-in	588	0.30
Total votes	198,071	100.00

== General election ==
=== Candidates ===
- Bruce Harrell, incumbent mayor
- Katie Wilson, community organizer

=== Post-primary endorsements ===
Bruce Harrell

Federal executive branch officials

- Pete Buttigieg, former United States Secretary of Transportation (2021–2025)

U.S. representatives

- Adam Smith, WA-09 (1997–present)
- Pramila Jayapal, WA-07 (2017–present) (co-endorsement with Wilson, previously sole endorsement of Harrell)

Statewide officials

- Steve Hobbs, Secretary of State of Washington (2021–present)

State legislators

- John Lovick, state senator from the 44th district (2021–present)

Local officials

- Claudia Balducci, Chair of the King County Council (2020–present) from the 6th district (2016–present)
- Rod Dembowski, King County Councilor from the 1st district (2013–present)
- Toshiko Grace Hasegawa, Port of Seattle Commissioner from Position 4 (2022–present) (co-endorsement with Wilson, previously sole endorsement of Harrell)
- Teresa Mosqueda, King County Councilor from the 8th district (2024–present) (co-endorsement with Wilson, previously sole endorsement of Harrell)

Labor unions

- International Brotherhood of Teamsters Locals 117, 174 and 763
- King County Labor Council (co-endorsement with Wilson, previously sole endorsement of Harrell)
- Service Employees International Union Locals 6 and 777
Katie Wilson

2025 mayoral candidates

- Joe Mallahan, former vice president at T-Mobile US and runner-up for mayor in 2009

U.S. Representatives

- Jamaal Bowman, NY-16 (2021–2025)
- Pramila Jayapal, WA-07 (2017–present) (co-endorsement with Harrell, previously sole endorsement of Harrell)

State legislators

- Yasmin Trudeau, state senator from the 28th district (2021–present)

Local officials

- Toshiko Grace Hasegawa, Port of Seattle Commissioner from Position 4 (2022–present) (co-endorsement with Harrell, previously sole endorsement of Harrell)
- Nick Licata, former president of the Seattle City Council (2006–2008) from position 6 (1998–2016)
- Joe Mizrahi, Seattle Public Schools board member from the 4th district (2024–present)
- Teresa Mosqueda, King County Councilor from the 8th district (2024–present) (co-endorsement with Harrell, previously sole endorsement of Harrell)

Labor unions

- King County Labor Council (co-endorsement with Harrell, previously sole endorsement of Harrell)
- Service Employees International Union Local 925
- United Food and Commercial Workers Local 3000

Organizations

- FairVote Washington
- Fuse Washington
- Planned Parenthood Alliance Advocates - Washington

=== Polling ===
Poll source	Date(s) administered	Sample size	Margin of error	Bruce Harrell	Katie Wilson	Other	Undecided
Change Research (D)	October 19–23, 2025	615 (LV)	± 4.0%	36%	44%	–	20%
Change Research (D)	October 19–23, 2025	615 (LV)	± 4.0%	40%	45%	4% (Note: "Would not vote" with 4%)	11%
DHM Research (Note: This poll was sponsored by The Stranger)	October 6–13, 2025	400 (LV)	± 4.0%	38%	42%	–	20%
DHM Research	October 6–13, 2025	600 (RV)	± 4.0%	34%	46%	–	20%
Change Research (D)	July 23–25, 2025	651 (LV)	± 4.1%	37%	40%	–	24%
Change Research (D)	May 10–14, 2025	522 (LV)	± 4.4%	25%	18%	–	56%

=== Results ===
General election turnout map by precinct 0–10% 10–20% 20–30% 30–40% 40–50% 50–60% 60–70% 70–80%

A consultant representing Harrell from Northwest Passage Consulting predicted that Harrell would be favored in the counting of the final ballots. Independent analysts of the election predicted Wilson will win based on previous results of late ballots for progressive candidates. Decision Desk HQ originally called the race for Harrell, but later retracted the call. By November 11, a narrow majority of the counted ballots were cast for Wilson. On November 12, some media organizations called the race for Wilson. Decision Desk HQ made a call for her the next day.

Wilson prevailed in denser areas, leading in more heavily urbanized precincts of the Capitol Hill and the Central District, as well as performing strongly in the areas with prominent multi-family developments. Furthermore, she did well with younger voters, securing the precinct hosting the University of Washington. Conversely, Harrell led in the city's wealthier coastal areas and neighborhoods with more common single-family housing.

General election results
Candidate	Votes	%
Katie Wilson	138,931	50.20
Bruce Harrell (incumbent)	136,920	49.47
Write-in	911	0.33
Total votes	280,375	100.00

==== By congressional district ====
Harrell narrowly outran Wilson in the portion of the seventh district representing most of the city He secured just slightly more than half of the vote there, prevailing by 4,045 votes. In contrast, Wilson won in the smaller portion of the ninth district representing the southeast portion of Seattle, winning by 6,056 votes. Their performance mirrored the 2021 election, when Harrell carried the seventh district and González led in the ninth; however, Harrell ceded ground in both, losing 9.84% and 7.24% of the vote, respectively.

District	Wilson, #	Wilson, %	Harrell, #	Harrell, %	Representative
7th (part)	114,608	48.35%	118,653	50.06%	Pramila Jayapal
9th (part)	24,323	56.11%	18,267	42.14%	Adam Smith

== See also ==
- 2025 Seattle City Attorney election
- 2025 Seattle City Council election

== Notes ==
Partisan clients
