= 2021 Seattle City Council election =

- November 2, 2021; Officially nonpartisan

2 of the 9 seats on the Seattle City Council 5 seats needed for a majority
	Majority party	Minority party
Party	Democratic	Socialist Alternative
Seats before	8	1
Seats won	8	1
Seat change	Steady	Steady
- Composition of the Seattle City Council by political party (Note: Officially nonpartisan)
President of the City Council before election
Lorena González
Nonpartisan
Elected President of the City Council
Debora Juarez
Nonpartisan

The 2021 Seattle City Council election were held on November 2, 2021. Two seats of the nine-member Seattle City Council were up for election.

== Background ==
Four incumbent members of the Seattle City Council did not seek reelection in the 2019 election while the three other incumbents won reelection. Mayor Jenny Durkan announced that she would not seek reelection in the 2021 election.

The 2021 election cycle was the 3rd use of Seattle's Democracy Vouchers Program, which other cities and states have looked to replicate.

== District 8 ==
=== Campaign ===
Teresa Mosqueda, who had served on the city council since her election in 2015, announced on May 5, 2021, that she would seek reelection instead of running in the mayoral election. Kate Martin, who was also running for mayor, announced her campaign for city council on March 23. Michael McQuaid ran in the election, but withdrew after his criminal record involving multiple assaults was reported on.

=== Campaign finance ===
Bobby Lindsey, Jordan Elizabeth Fisher, Martin, Paul Glumaz, and Mosqueda are participating in the democracy voucher program.

Candidate	Campaign committee			
Candidate	Raised	Spent	COH	L&D
Brian Fahey	$1,914.23	$1,914.23	$0.00	$0.00
Jordan Elizabeth Fisher	$1,751.38	$0.00	$1,751.38	$0.00
Paul Glumaz	$6,861.86	$2,797.73	$4,064.13	$0.00
Kate Martin	$5,846.25	$3,576.49	$2,269.76	$0.00
Teresa Mosqueda	$163,777.20	$47,922.85	$115,854.35	$3,090.80

=== Endorsements ===
Teresa Mosqueda

Federal officials

- Pramila Jayapal, member of the United States House of Representatives from Washington's 7th congressional district

Statewide officials

- Bob Ferguson, 18th attorney general of Washington

Local officials

- Lorena González, member of the Seattle City Council from the 9th district

=== Primary election ===
==== Polling ====
Poll source	Date(s) administered	Sample size (Note: Key: A – all adults RV – registered voters LV – likely voters V – unclear)	Margin of error	Brian Fahey	Jordan Elizabeth Fisher	George Freeman	Paul Glumaz	Jesse James	Kate Martin	Bobby Lindsey Miller	Teresa Mosqueda	Alex Tsimerman	Alexander White	Kenneth Wilson	Undecided
Change Research (D) (Note: Poll sponsored by the Northwest Progressive Institute)	July 12–15, 2021	617 (LV)	± 4.3%	0%	1%	0%	3%	1%	6%	3%	26%	1%	1%	1%	55%

==== Results ====
Primary election
Party	Candidate	Votes	%
Nonpartisan	Teresa Mosqueda (incumbent)	113,052	59.4
Nonpartisan	Kenneth Wilson	30,862	16.2
Nonpartisan	Kate Martin	21,997	11.6
Nonpartisan	Paul Glumaz	10,228	5.4
Nonpartisan	Alexander White	2,474	1.3
Nonpartisan	Bobby Miller	2,438	1.3
Nonpartisan	Jesse James	2,051	1.1
Nonpartisan	Jordan Elizabeth Fisher	1,810	1.0
Nonpartisan	George Freeman	1,575	0.8
Nonpartisan	Alex Tsimerman	961	0.5
Nonpartisan	Brian Fahey	887	0.8
Write-in		2,075	1.1
Total votes		190,410	100.0

=== General election ===
==== Debate ====
2021 Seattle City Council district 8 debate
No.	Date	Host	Moderator	Link	Nonpartisan	Nonpartisan
Key: P Participant A Absent N Not invited I Invited W Withdrawn						
Key: P Participant A Absent N Not invited I Invited W Withdrawn					Teresa Mosqueda	Kenneth Wilson
1	Sep. 30, 2021	Seattle Channel	Brian Callanan		P	P

==== Polling ====
Graphical summary

Poll source	Date(s) administered	Sample size	Margin of error	Teresa Mosqueda	Kenneth Wilson	Other	Undecided
Change Research (D)	October 12–15, 2021	617 (LV)	± 4.1%	39%	31%	3% (Note: "Would not vote" with 3%)	26%
Elway Research	September 7–9, 2021	400 (LV)	± 5.0%	33%	17%	11%	33%

==== Results ====
General election
Party	Candidate	Votes	%
Nonpartisan	Teresa Mosqueda (incumbent)	149,589	59.40
Nonpartisan	Kenneth Wilson	101,168	40.17
Write-in		1,074	0.43
Total votes		251,831	100.00

== District 9 ==
=== Campaign ===
Lorena González, who was first elected in the 2015 election and was selected to serve as president of the city council in 2020, announced on February 3, 2021, that she would run in the mayoral election. Nikkita Oliver, who had run in the 2017 mayoral election, announced that they would run for city council on March 10. Businesswoman Sara Nelson, who had run in the 8th district in 2017, and Brianna Thomas, who worked as González's chief of staff, also ran in the election.

=== Campaign finance ===
Brianna K. Thomas, Corey Eichner, Oliver, and Xtian Gunter are participating in the democracy voucher program.

Candidate	Campaign committee			
Candidate	Raised	Spent	COH	L&D
Corey Eichner	$9,680.00	$4,358.33	$5,321.67	$0.00
Claire Grant	$901.32	$427.77	$473.55	$0.00
Lindsay McHaffie	$0.00	$1,296.86	-$1,296.86	$0.00
Sara Nelson	$133,853.98	$39,223.04	$94,630.94	$5,500.00
Nikkita Oliver	$183,429.01	$55,176.40	$128,252.61	$0.00
Brianna Thomas	$86,278.01	$39,301.57	$46,976.44	$6,372.00

=== Endorsements ===
Nelson endorsements

Local officials

- Richard Conlin, former member of the Seattle City Council from the 2nd position
- Jan Drago, former member of the Seattle City Council from the 4th position
- Jean Godden, former member of the Seattle City Council from the 1st position
- Tom Rasmussen, former member of the Seattle City Council from the 5th position
- Heidi Wills, former member of the Seattle City Council

Media

- The Seattle Times

Individuals

- Ian Eisenberg, founder of Uncle Ike's Pot Shop
Oliver endorsements

State officials

- Tarra Simmons, member of the Washington House of Representatives from the 23rd district

Local officials

- Tammy Morales, member of the Seattle City Council from the 2nd district
- Teresa Mosqueda, member of the Seattle City Council from the 8th district
- Girmay Zahilay, member of the King County Council from the 2nd district

Organizations

- Seattle Democratic Socialists of America

Media

- The Stranger (newspaper)
- The Urbanist
Thomas endorsements

State officials
Local officials

- Sally Bagshaw, former member of the Seattle City Council from the 2nd district
- Lorena González, member of the Seattle City Council from the 9th district
- Lisa Herbold, member of the Seattle City Council from the 1st district
- Dan Strauss, member of the Seattle City Council from the 6th district

=== Primary election ===
==== Debate ====
2021 Seattle City Council district 9 primary election debate
No.	Date	Host	Moderator	Link	Nonpartisan	Nonpartisan	Nonpartisan	Nonpartisan
Key: P Participant A Absent N Not invited I Invited W Withdrawn								
Key: P Participant A Absent N Not invited I Invited W Withdrawn					Cory Eichner	Sara Nelson	Nikkita Oliver	Brianna Thomas
1	Jun. 3, 2021	Washington's 43rd legislative district Democratic Party	Erica Barnett	YouTube	P	P	P	P

==== Polling ====
Poll source	Date(s) administered	Sample size	Margin of error	Corey Eichner	Xtian Gunther	Lindsay McHaffie	Sara Nelson	Nikkita Oliver	Brianna Thomas	Rebecca Williamson	Undecided
Change Research (D)	July 12–15, 2021	617 (LV)	± 4.3%	3%	1%	0%	11%	26%	6%	0%	50%

==== Results ====
Primary election
Party	Candidate	Votes	%
Nonpartisan	Nikkita Oliver	79,799	40.2
Nonpartisan	Sara Nelson	78,388	39.5
Nonpartisan	Brianna Thomas	26,651	13.4
Nonpartisan	Corey Eichner	10,228	3.5
Nonpartisan	Lindsay McHaffie	3,048	1.5
Nonpartisan	Rebecca Williamson	1,646	0.8
Nonpartisan	Xtian Gunther	1,409	0.7
Write-in		637	0.3
Total votes		198,608	100.0

=== General election ===
==== Debate ====
2021 Seattle City Council district 9 general election debate
No.	Date	Host	Moderator	Link	Nonpartisan	Nonpartisan
Key: P Participant A Absent N Not invited I Invited W Withdrawn						
Key: P Participant A Absent N Not invited I Invited W Withdrawn					Sara Nelson	Nikkita Oliver
1	Oct. 5, 2021	Seattle Channel	Brian Callanan	YouTube	P	P

==== Polling ====
Graphical summary

Poll source	Date(s) administered	Sample size	Margin of error	Sara Nelson	Nikkita Oliver	Other	Undecided
Change Research (D)	October 12–15, 2021	617 (LV)	± 4.1%	41%	37%	2% (Note: "Would not vote" with 2%)	21%
Elway Research	September 7–9, 2021	400 (LV)	± 5.0%	31%	26%	9%	34%

==== Results ====
General election
Party	Candidate	Votes	%
Nonpartisan	Sara Nelson	139,336	53.84
Nonpartisan	Nikkita Oliver	119,025	45.99
Write-in		437	0.17
Total votes		258,798	100.00

== See also ==
- 2021 Seattle mayoral election
- 2021 Seattle City Attorney election

== Notes ==
Partisan clients
