= Dionne Foster =

American politician

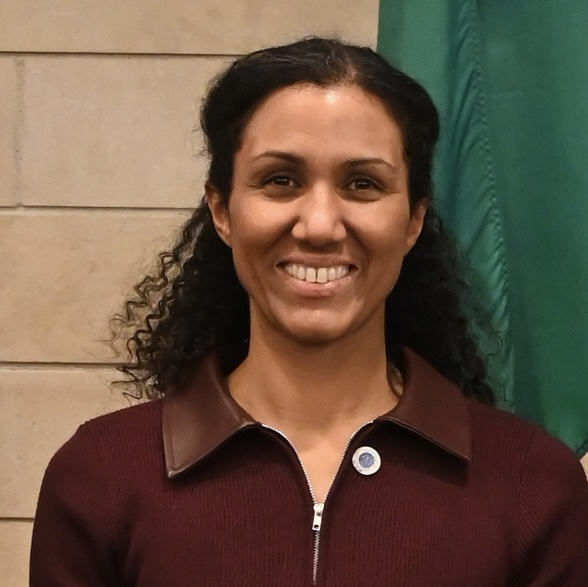
- Foster in 2026

Member of the Seattle City Council for Position 9
- Incumbent
- Assumed office January 2, 2026
- Preceded by: Sara Nelson

Personal details
- Born: 1988 or 1989 (age 36–37) Germany
- Education: George Mason University (BA); University of Washington (MSW)
- Website: Campaign website

Dionne Foster is an American politician who is the councilmember for Seattle City Council Position 9. She was elected in 2025, defeating City Council President Sara Nelson.

== Early life and career ==
Foster was born in Germany and raised in Virginia by her mother, who was a member of the United States Army and later worked as a teacher. Foster attended George Mason University, where she earned a Bachelor of Arts in sociology and women's studies. While at George Mason, she received the Spirit King Award for a commitment to civil rights and the Dennis-Weathers Award for a dedication to increasing cross-cultural awareness. Foster moved to Seattle in 2011, earning a Master's degree from the University of Washington School of Social Work and would later become an adjunct faculty member.

After college, Foster worked at Puget Sound Sage, a social work nonprofit. From 2016 to 2018, she worked for Seattle Public Utilities, a government agency for the city, as a policy advisor tasked with boosting enrollment for the city's utilities discount program. From 2018 to 2020, Foster managed grants as a program officer for the Seattle Foundation, a non-profit community foundation. Before running for office, Foster worked as executive director of the Washington Progress Alliance, a progressive advocacy organization, where she spearheaded advocacy for Washington state's capital gains tax.

== Seattle City Council ==
=== 2025 campaign ===
In March 2025, Foster announced her candidacy for Seattle City Council, challenging City Council President Sara Nelson. She ran against two other challengers in the primary, former federal economist Connor Nash and longshoreman Mia Jacobson. In the August primary, Foster came in first, with 58.4% of the vote, and advanced to the general election with Nelson, who came in a distant second with 35.3%.

Foster campaigned as a progressive, advocating for rebuilding the Seattle Police Department, greater investments in affordable housing, and rent stabilization. She also campaigned on denser housing and a greater focus on climate change in the city council. Nelson focused her campaign on addressing substance abuse and public safety, while defending her support for the Stay Out of Drug Areas (SODA) zones, Stay Out of Areas of Prostitution (SOAP) zones, and expanded surveillance cameras. Foster criticized the SODA and SOAP zones, calling them "banishment zones" without a comprehensive solution, and stated she would have voted against the surveillance cameras, citing the risk of the federal government using the data for deportations.

During the general election, Foster led two polls of the Position 9 race, one commissioned by The Stranger and another by the Northwest Progressive Institute. In the November general election, Foster defeated Nelson in a landslide, 62.8% to 37%.

=== Tenure ===
In her first 100 days in office, Foster sponsored two bills. One bill authorized an interlock agreement between the executive branch and the social housing developer regarding how the designated payroll tax would be implemented and how loans would be repaid. The other bill focused on data privacy protection for people accessing City services.

In July 2026, the Seattle City Council voted to approve Mayor Katie Wilson's plan on implementing the Families, Education, Preschool, and Promises (FEPP) Levy, which included funding for universal school meals for the 2026-27 school year. During the special meeting, Foster, along with Council President Joy Hollingsworth and Debora Juarez, introduced an amendment to delay the universial school meals to add $500,000 a year to a food assistance program for at-need families during weekends and school breaks. Although the amendment received pushback from public commentors, the amendment passed 6-3. The following day, Foster, Hollingsworth and Dan Strauss announced a plan to fund universial school meals for the 2026-27 school year through the general fund.

== Personal life ==
Foster has one son. She lives in Rainier Beach.

== Electoral history ==
=== 2025 election ===
2025 Seattle City Council 9th district primary election
Candidate	Votes	%
Dionne Foster	110,636	58.44%
Sara Nelson (incumbent)	66,909	35.34%
Mia Jacobson	5,845	3.09%
Connor Nash	5,532	2.92%
Write-in	393	0.21%
Total votes	189,315	100.00%

2025 Seattle City Council 9th district general election
Candidate	Votes	%
Dionne Foster	165,930	62.80%
Sara Nelson (incumbent)	97,710	36.98%
Write-in	579	0.22%
Total votes	264,219	100.00%
