= SCLC =

SCLC may refer to:

- Southern Christian Leadership Conference, an American civil rights organization
- San Cristóbal de las Casas, a city in Chiapas, Mexico
- Small-cell lung cancer
- Supply Chain Leadership Collaboration, in the Carbon Disclosure Project
- Space charge limited current, in space charge
- Seattle Central Labor Council (1905–1919), a historical name for the King County Labor Council
