= Eddie Lin =

American lawyer and politician

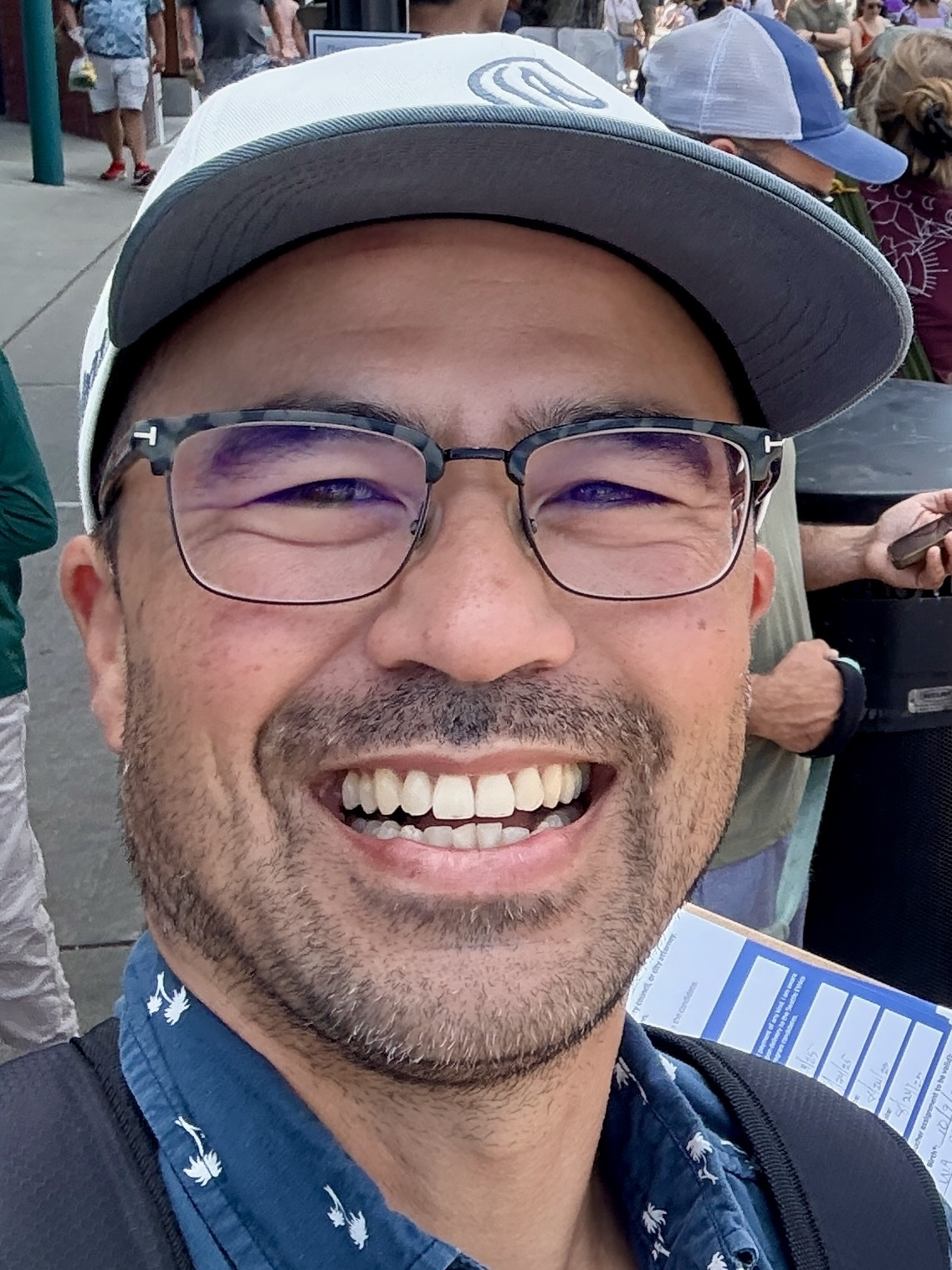
- Lin in 2025

Member of the Seattle City Council from the 2nd District
- Incumbent
- Assumed office November 25, 2025
- Preceded by: Mark Solomon

Personal details
- Born: Edward Chia Lin; 1976 or 1977 (age 49–50) North Carolina
- Education: Macalester College (BA); Seattle University (JD)
- Website: Campaign website

Edward Chia Lin is an American politician and attorney who is the councilmember for Seattle City Council District 2. He was elected in 2025, in a special election following the resignation of Tammy Morales.

== Early life and career ==
Lin was raised in the "Research Triangle" of North Carolina. His father was a Taiwanese immigrant and his mother is white; they both met while attending Duke University and married only a few years after Loving v. Virginia outlawed bans on interracial marriage.

Lin moved to Minnesota and attended Macalester College, where he met his wife. The couple moved to Seattle in the late 1990s after she finished her degree, though he did not complete his. While in Seattle, Lin worked various odd jobs, including working at a French bakery, the University bookstore, and being a bike messenger, while his wife worked as an AmeriCorps tutor. Lin would complete his undergraduate degree and his J.D. degree from Seattle University, while his wife earned her Masters degree from the University of Washington.

The couple moved to Oakland, where Lin worked as a secretary in two law firms and his wife worked as a teacher and was active in her union. They returned to Seattle during the height of the Great Recession and Lin worked at Perkins Coie and clerked for U.S. District Court Judge Thomas Zilly and the Washington Education Association. In 2017, Lin began work as an assistant attorney for the Seattle City Attorney's Office and in 2019, he represented the city’s Office of Housing.

== Seattle City Council ==
=== 2025 campaign ===
On December 4, 2024, Tammy Morales announced she would be resigning from the Seattle City Council effective January 6, 2025, criticizing how the council had been operating, leaving a vacant seat to be filled via appointment. Lin was one of six finalists nominated by a councilmember for the appointment, being nominated by Councilmember Alexis Mercedes Rinck. Morales' seat was eventually filled by the appointment of Mark Solomon, who did not run for reelection to the seat.

In late February, Lin announced his campaign for the special election to serve the remainder of Morales' term. Lin ran against three other candidates in the primary: food assistance advocate and restaurant industry advocate Jeanie Chunn, city building inspector and union organizer Jamie Fackler, and Adonis Ducksworth, a transportation policy advisor for Mayor Bruce Harrell. In the August primary, Lin came in first with 47% of the vote, and advanced to the general election with Ducksworth, who earned 29%.

Lin ran as a progressive, pushing for a capital gains tax, increased affordable housing construction, and restructuring the Seattle Police Department to include social workers. Ducksworth focused his campaign on advocating for greater training and apprenticeships in the trades, partnering with gun violence prevention organizations, increasing the size of the police department, and completing the Rainer Beach Skatepark. Both candidates opposed sweeps of homeless individuals, expanded surveillance cameras in the International District, and increasing funding for addiction treatment.

In the general election, Lin won in a landslide with 68% of the vote, with Ducksworth earning 31%.

=== Tenure ===
Lin was sworn into office on November 25, 2025. He became the chair of the Land Use & Sustainability Committee.

In his first roughly 100 days in office, Lin sponsored bills to update the permitting process to make development more efficient and to align the Seattle Municipal Code with the Keep Washington Working Act. He later sponsored a bill that repealed housing development in the Stadium District.

In April 2026, in response to a Seattle Times article that said 5 large-scale data centers were proposed to be built in Seattle, Lin proposed a bill to create a one-year moratorium on the creation or expansion of any large data centers within city limits. In June 2026, the moritorium passed the City Council unanmimously, making Seattle the largest city in the United States to ban data centers.

== Personal life ==
Lin is married with two children; his wife works as an educator. They live in Beacon Hill.

== Electoral history ==
=== 2025 election ===
2025 Seattle City Council 2nd district special primary election
Candidate	Votes	%
Eddie Lin	11,205	47.40%
Adonis Ducksworth	6,941	29.36%
Jeanie Chunn	2,992	12.66%
Jamie Fackler	2,397	10.14%
Write-in	106	0.45%
Total votes	23,641	100.00%

2025 Seattle City Council 2nd district special general election
Candidate	Votes	%
Eddie Lin	21,775	68.40%
Adonis Ducksworth	9,976	31.34%
Write-in	83	0.26%
Total votes	31,834	100.00%
