= Joy Hollingsworth =

American politician and former basketball player

President of the Seattle City Council
- Incumbent
- Assumed office January 6, 2026
- Preceded by: Sara Nelson

Member of the Seattle City Council from District 3
- Incumbent
- Assumed office January 2, 2024
- Preceded by: Kshama Sawant

Personal details
- Born: March 15, 1984 (age 42)
- Party: Democratic
- Occupation: Business owner

Jacqueline J. "Joy" Hollingsworth (born March 15, 1984) is an American politician, businessperson, and former basketball player. She is a member of the Seattle City Council from the 3rd district, having been elected in 2023 and has served as President of the City Council since 2026. She played basketball at the college level for the University of San Francisco and later the University of Arizona. She served as an assistant coach at Seattle University. Hollingsworth is now part of her family's local marijuana business, The Hollingsworth Cannabis Company (THC Co.), which is based in Washington.

== Early life and basketball career ==
Joy Hollingsworth was born in Seattle on March 15, 1984. Hollingsworth's paternal grandmother, Dorothy Hollingsworth, was a prominent educator and civil rights activist in Seattle. Her uncle is former Sonics player, Bruce Seals. Hollingsworth's mother, Rhonda, moved from New Orleans to Seattle to be closer to her brother, Bruce.

Hollingsworth played for Seattle Prep and led the basketball team to their first girl's state title in 2002. She started playing college basketball at the University of San Francisco and then later transferred to the University of Arizona after two years. She earned her Bachelor of Arts in 2007 from the University of Arizona and in 2009, earned a master's degree in Education in Intercollegiate Athletics Leadership from the University of Washington.

Before the 2009–2010 basketball season, she was hired as the assistant women's basketball coach at Seattle University. Hollingsworth also played basketball in Athens, and has written for ESPN The Magazine.

=== San Francisco and Arizona statistics ===
Legend
GP	Games played	GS	Games started	MPG	Minutes per game
FG%	Field goal percentage	3P%	3-point field goal percentage	FT%	Free throw percentage
RPG	Rebounds per game	APG	Assists per game	SPG	Steals per game
BPG	Blocks per game	PPG	Points per game	**Bold**	Career high

Year	Team	GP	Points	FG%	3P%	FT%	RPG	APG	SPG	BPG	PPG
2002–03	San Francisco	29	309	40.7%	**36.1%**	**80.6%**	5.0	1.6	1.8	0.0	10.7
2003–04	San Francisco	27	293	41.2%	25.8%	57.1%	5.9	1.9	1.1	0.0	10.9
2004–05	Did not play due to NCAA transfer rules										
2005–06	Arizona	30	431	**43.3%**	33.3%	56.1%	**6.0**	**2.3**	1.3	**0.2**	14.4
2006–07	Arizona	**32**	**518**	39.5%	28.4%	74.8%	5.3	2.2	**2.1**	0.1	**16.2**
Career		118	1551	41.1%	11.1%	66.7%	10.3	2.0	1.6	0.1	13.1

== Post-basketball ==
Hollingsworth left coaching in 2012. In 2013, Hollingsworth's brother, Raft, convinced the family to begin and invest in a marijuana business, growing plants for their own business. They opened the Hollingsworth Cannabis Company (THC Co.), located in Shelton, with Hollingsworth overseeing processing. Their marijuana farm has around 9,000 plants and appeared on an episode of Anthony Bourdain: Parts Unknown.

Hollingsworth and her family were crucial in ensuring a law supporting more people of color entering the cannabis industry in Washington state passed.

== Seattle City Council ==
=== 2023 election ===
In January 2023, Hollingsworth announced that she would be running to represent District 3 on the Seattle City Council. In her announcement, Hollingsworth state she would "develop and promote progressive and practical strategies to address root causes..." Later that week, incumbent Kshama Sawant, the council's only socialist member, announced that she would not run for reelection.

In the primary, Mayor Bruce Harrell endorsed Hollingsworth of the eight challengers for the open seat. She earned the most votes in the August election, with 36.87% of the vote, and advancing to the general election alongside transportation advocate Alex Hudson, who earned 36.53%. Hollingsworth and Hudson agreed that homelessness, housing affordability, and public safety, but differed on approach, with Hollingsworth supporting moderate solutions and Hudson more progressive ones. Hollingsworth advocated for increasing police staffing and supported the city council's bill to prosecute low-level drug offenses, while Hudson advocated for greater community investments and police alternatives.

In the November general election, Hollingsworth defeated Hudson, 52.94% to 46.71%.

=== Tenure ===
Hollingsworth took office on January 2, 2024. She was sworn in with five other new council members who all ran on a moderate platform, representing the largest turnover in the city council since 1911.

In July 2024, Hollingsworth proposed legislation that would continue exempting businesses with less than 500 employees from matching the minimum wage for companies with 500+ employees and increasing the minimum wage based on inflation. The plan was meant to advert small businesses from wages increasing by $3 per hour. After public backlash from citizens, workers, and labor organizers, Hollingsworth pulled the bill, though she vowed to continue to advance the bill in the future.

Hollingsworth also voted in favor of the controversial exclusionary zones known as the Stay Out of Drug Areas (SODA) and Stay Out of Areas of Prostitution (SOAP). She added amendments that would create a SODA zone in the Capital Hill neighborhood to disrupt drug trafficking in the area.

On January 6, 2026, Hollingsworth was unanimously selected to be President of the Seattle City Council after incumbent president Sara Nelson lost her bid for reelection.

In July 2026, the Seattle City Council voted to approve Mayor Katie Wilson's plan on implementing the Families, Education, Preschool, and Promises (FEPP) Levy, which included funding for universal school meals for the 2026-27 school year. During the special meeting, Hollingsworth, along with Dionne Foster and Debora Juarez, introduced an amendment to delay the universial school meals to add $500,000 a year to a food assistnce program for at-need families during weekends and school breaks. Although the amendment received pushback from public commentors, the amendment passed 6-3. The following day, Foster, Hollingsworth and Dan Strauss announced a plan to fund universial school meals for the 2026-27 school year through the general fund.

== Electoral history ==
=== 2023 election ===
City of Seattle, City Council, District 3, 2023 Primary Election
Party	Candidate	Votes	%
Nonpartisan	Joy Hollingsworth	9,690	36.87%
Nonpartisan	Alex Hudson	9,601	36.53%
Nonpartisan	Bobby Goodwin	2,755	10.48%
Nonpartisan	Alex Cooley	1,118	4.25%
Nonpartisan	Efrain Hudnell	1,081	4.11%
Nonpartisan	Andrew Ashiofu	1,059	4.03%
Nonpartisan	Ry Armstrong	488	1.86%
Nonpartisan	Shobhit Agarwal	406	1.54%
Nonpartisan	Write-in	82	0.31%
Turnout		26,824	36.33%
Registered electors		73,844	

Seattle City Council District 3, General Election 2023
Party	Candidate	Votes	%
Nonpartisan	Joy Hollingsworth	17,805	52.94%
Nonpartisan	Alex Hudson	15,709	46.71%
Nonpartisan	Write-in	119	0.35%
Turnout		34,584	46.77%
Registered electors		73,945	
