= Decision Desk HQ =

Election results website

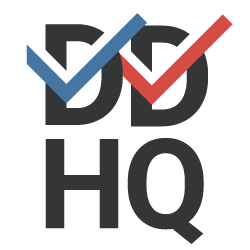
- Website type: Election results
- Available in: English
- Creator: Brandon Finnigan
- Services: Providing election results and race calls
- Website: decisiondeskhq.com
- Commercial: Yes
- Registration: No
- Launched: 2012
- Current status: Online

Decision Desk HQ is an American website that focuses on reporting election results in the United States. Decision Desk HQ uses an application programming interface (API) to obtain election results at the same time as they are published on websites provided by election officials. As of April 2025, it currently has United States election coverage partnerships with Nexstar Media Group owned outlets The Hill and NewsNation, as well as Ballotpedia for U.S. local election coverage, along with others. It was the first provider to call the 2020 and 2024 presidential elections.

== History ==
=== Founding and 2010s ===
Decision Desk HQ was founded in 2012 as Ace of Spades HQ Decision Desk by Brandon Finnigan, a truck dispatcher at the time. According to Buzzfeed, race calls at the time were almost entirely the domain of television networks, with data sourced entirely from the Associated Press. Decision Desk utilized an all-volunteer team to gather election results from across the country and report them. Despite being associated with a conservative blog, Decision Desk received praise from David Nir of Daily Kos for challenging the "opaque" AP in a "transparent" manner. According to Finnigan, the goal of Decision Desk was to make election result reporting more transparent by providing an additional media source run by "election junkies"; Finnigan hoped a "real-time count" of election results could make it harder for candidates to claim elections are rigged.

Decision Desk began covering races in the 2012 United States elections, and achieved substantial coverage for projecting the upset defeat of House Majority Leader Eric Cantor during his reelection bid to Virginia's 7th congressional district in 2014. For the 2016 elections, Decision Desk partnered with Buzzfeed to deliver election results, with live coverage through Periscope. Buzzfeed again partnered with Decision Desk for the 2018 elections.

=== 2020s ===
In 2020, Decision Desk HQ was considered one of nine "official sources" for election results by Twitter and provided election results to The Economist, BuzzFeed, Vox, and Business Insider. They were the first major election reporting organization to call the 2020 United States presidential election for Joe Biden; the call was made shortly before 9 a.m. ET on Friday, November 6, a day before most of the networks. It made this call after projecting that Biden's lead in outstanding mail-in ballots from Pennsylvania left incumbent Donald Trump with no realistic path to win Pennsylvania and its 20 electoral votes. McCoy told Vox that the great majority of mail-in ballots from Pennsylvania were from heavily Democratic areas around Philadelphia and Pittsburgh. According to McCoy, Biden was winning the mail-in vote in those areas by a margin large enough to make his lead in the state insurmountable. By Decision Desk HQ's accounting, adding Pennsylvania to Biden's total gave Biden 273 electoral votes, three over the threshold to make him president-elect. Vox, who partnered with Decision Desk HQ, called the election for Biden shortly after. Statistician Nate Silver praised Decision Desk HQ's call and hoped other sources would follow suit.

During the 2022 United States elections, Decision Desk HQ provided election data to Nexstar Media Group owned media outlet NewsNation, ultimately calling control of Congress on November 15, 2022, 6:13 pm EST, a day before other media outlets. In November 2023, Decision Desk HQ announced a partnership with Nexstar Media Group-owned The Hill and NewsNation for 2024 United States elections coverage. In May 2024, Decision Desk HQ announced a partnership with Ballotpedia to provide real-time election results coverage for local elections in the United States. Decision Desk HQ reprised providing election data to NewsNation, and was the first to call the 2024 United States presidential election for Donald Trump. Its election forecast had given Trump a 54% chance of winning, and predicted six of seven swing states correctly.

On March 31, 2025, Nexstar announced a continuation of its partnership with Decision Desk HQ for the 2025 and 2026 United States election coverage for NewsNation and The Hill.

== Staff and organization ==
On election nights, Decision Desk HQ employs a team of ground reporters and remote entry staff, along with student workers from Georgetown University; they based operations out of Georgetown’s McCourt School of Public Policy in the 2024 election cycle.

As of 2024, Decision Desk HQ founder Brandon Finnigan is the director of elections. The majority owner of Decision Desk HQ and its director of data science is Scott Tranter. He is a co-founder of the political data firm Øptimus Analytics and previously served as Director of Data Science for Marco Rubio's 2016 presidential campaign. Drew McCoy is the president of Decision Desk HQ.

=== Methodology and race projections ===
Decision Desk HQ is one of multiple outlets that track election results nationwide; the other major outlets are the Associated Press and, formerly, Edison Research. They use a mix of traditional phone call and fax communication with election officials, as well as an application programming interface (API) that pulls election results as they come in from county and state election websites. Election calls are made when the race call team unanimously agrees that the trailing candidate can no longer make up the difference. Some races are "insta-calls" and are called the moment polls close.

=== Notable incorrect projections ===
Like the Associated Press, Decision Desk HQ has a high success rate of over 99% as of 2020, although some races have been projected incorrectly. Both the AP and Decision Desk HQ incorrectly projected the 2018 election in California’s 21st Congressional District, where Republican David Valadao lost to TJ Cox, and Decision Desk HQ incorrectly projected that the wrong candidate would win the 2020 Democratic primary in Missouri’s 1st congressional district. In 2025, Decision Desk HQ projected Bruce Harrell as the winner of the 2025 Seattle mayoral election, but then retracted it the next day. A spokesperson for Decision Desk HQ attributed the call to receiving incorrect data on the number of remaining ballots, but this was disputed by King County elections. In 2026, DDHQ projected Tom Malinowski the winner of the Democratic primary for the 2026 NJ-11 Special election. However, later in the night, Analilia Mejia, one of Malinowski's opponents, took a small lead over him, causing DDHQ to remove the projection. On February 10, Malinowski conceded the race to Mejia.

=== Decision Desk HQ News ===
In 2021, Decision Desk HQ announced the creation of Decision Desk HQ News and the subsequent acquisition of its first site: Elections Daily. The new undertakings are designed to expand Decision Desk HQ's local news and international elections coverage.

=== Decision Desk HQ Votes ===
On November 4, 2025, Decision Desk HQ announced a new platform for viewing election results, called Decision Desk HQ Votes. The new platform was announced on the same page where the 2025 United States election results were being shown. DDHQ Votes was released to the public on March 2, 2026 and is in beta format.

== See also ==
- Decision desk – Experts projecting U.S. election winners
