= Dorothy Hollingsworth =

American educator (1920–2022)

Dorothy L. Hollingsworth (October 29, 1920 – July 27, 2022) was an American educator based in Seattle.

Hollingsworth was born on October 29, 1920, in Bishopville, South Carolina. Her family moved to North Carolina when she was young. She graduated from Paine College in 1941. In 1946 she moved to Seattle with her husband. She worked as a social worker in Seattle's Central District in the 1950s and 1960s.

Hollingsworth became the first director of Seattle Public Schools' Head Start program in 1965. She was elected to the Seattle School Board in 1975, serving in that role until 1981. She was the first black woman in the state of Washington to serve on a school board. She also served as director of early childhood education for Seattle and was a member of the Washington State Board of Education.

Hollingsworth died on July 27, 2022, at the age of 101.

Her granddaughter, Joy Hollingsworth, was elected to represent Central Seattle on the Seattle City Council in 2023.

== See also ==
- Seattle school boycott of 1966
