= Sara Nelson (politician) =

Member of Seattle City Council

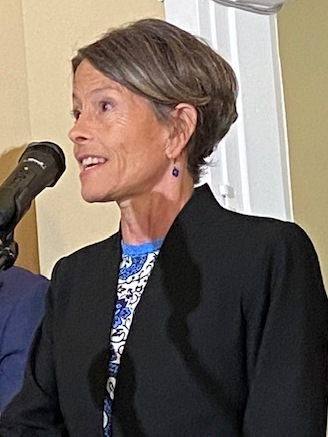

President of the Seattle City Council
- In office January 2, 2024 – January 2, 2026
- Preceded by: Debora Juarez
- Succeeded by: Joy Hollingsworth

Member of the Seattle City Council for Position 9
- In office January 1, 2022 – January 2, 2026
- Preceded by: Lorena González
- Succeeded by: Dionne Foster

Personal details
- Party: Democratic
- Education: University of California, Santa Barbara (BA); University of Washington (PhD)
- Website: Campaign website

Sara E. Nelson is an American businesswoman and politician who served for 4 years on the Seattle City Council. A member of the Democratic Party, she was elected in 2021. In January 2024, the city council voted unanimously to appoint her City Council President.

== Early life and career ==
Nelson grew up "really poor" in Sacramento to a family of McGovern-supporting Democrats. Her parents divorced when she was 12, her mother struggling to raise her as a single mom, her father an alcoholic. She received a BA degree from the University of California, Santa Barbara and a PhD in Anthropology from the University of Washington.

After receiving her PhD, Nelson worked as a policy staff member for then-councilmember Richard Conlin from 2002 to 2013. Nelson was bitter after Conlin's loss to Socialist Kshama Sawant, stating that the council is responding to activist voices.

In 2009, Nelson, along with her husband Matt Lincecum, founded Fremont Brewing in the namesake neighborhood of Fremont, earning the King County Business of the Year award in 2014.

== Seattle City Council ==
=== 2017 election ===
In 2017, Nelson ran for Seattle City Council position 8, portraying herself as a business-friendly candidate who maintained progressive bona fides. In the August primary, Nelson came in third with 21.48%, with labor activist Teresa Mosqueda and tenant advocate Jon Grant advancing to the general election.

=== 2021 election ===
In 2021, Nelson again attempted to run for the city council, this time running for the position 9 office being vacated by Lorena Gonzalez who ran for Mayor of Seattle. In the August primary, seven candidates ran for the open seat, with Nelson and activist Nikkita Oliver advancing to the general election, with 39.47% and 40.18%, respectively.

Nelson was the more moderate choice in the election, with issues such as policing, homelessness, and pandemic recovery coming to the forefront. One of the most drastic differences between the candidates was their approach to policing and police funding. Oliver, a police abolitionist, called for a 50% cut to the budget of the Seattle Police Department, arguing the funds could be better used to address root causes of crime. Nelson argued that the police budget should not be cut at all and that reforming the department would be the best solution.

Throughout the election, Nelson claimed to have not laid off employees during the COVID pandemic, but a report showed that seven full-time and part-time employees were let go before Thanksgiving 2020. Nelson dismissed the claims, saying "The employees you mention were part-time and/or seasonal hires, and the busy season — as much as there was a 'busy season' in 2020 — ended. We kept on every full-time employee who was on payroll when the pandemic hit..."

In the general election, Nelson won with 53.84% of the vote to Oliver's 45.99%.

=== 2025 election ===
In December 2024, Nelson announced she planned to run for reelection. She drew three challengers for the primary, including Dionne Foster, executive director of the Washington Progress Alliance, and Connor Nash, a former economist for the federal government. In the August primary, Nelson came in a distant second, with 35% of the vote, and advanced to the general election against Foster, who earned 58%.

Nelson focused her campaign on addressing substance abuse and public safety, while defending her support for the Stay Out of Drug Areas (SODA) zones, Stay Out of Areas of Prostitution (SOAP) zones, and expanded surveillance cameras. In the general election, she would increase her "anti-Trump" rhetoric, and said Foster was "inexpereinced" to stand up to Trump. Foster ran as a progressive, advocating for rebuilding the Seattle Police Department, greater investments in affordable housing, and rent stabilization. She criticized Nelson for the SODA and SOAP zones, calling them "banishment zones" without a comprehensive solution, and stated she would have voted against the surveillance cameras, citing the risk of the federal government using the data for deportations.

During the general election, Foster led two polls of the Position 9 race, one commissioned by The Stranger and another by the Northwest Progressive Institute. In the November general election, Foster defeated Nelson in a landslide, 62.8% to 37%.

=== Tenure ===
In her first two years in office, Nelson was a minority in the city council as a moderate, with the majority of the council being progressive. She pushed for increased public safety measures, like police hiring bonuses and an ordinance criminalizing drug possession.

In the 2023 election, the council experienced the largest changeover since 1911, with five new council members who campaigned on a moderate platform taking office. In January 2024, Nelson was elected to council president by a unanimous vote from her fellow council members. She stated her focus as council president would be on public safety and government accountability, especially with the King County Regional Homelessness Authority. As council president, Nelson oversaw the passage of police hiring bonuses and the creation of controversial exclusionary zones, known as the Stay Out of Drug Areas and Stay Out of Areas of Prostitution. She also worked to pass laws increasing the number of surveillance cameras in areas with high crime rates.

In January 2025, Nelson released a redevelopment plan to build a mix of housing and retail in the industrial SoDo neighborhood. The plan was met with opposition from industry groups, unions, and the Port of Seattle, which stated they may sue to block the plan if passed by the council, while supporters included stadium owners and developers. In March 2025, the plan passed the city council 6-3. In April, the Port sued to block the legislation saying it was an unlawful “spot rezone” and violates state and local land use laws. In July, a King County Superior court judge allowed the lawsuit to move forward and granted the port permission to depose Nelson. In November, the state's Growth Management Hearings Board invalidated the legislation, saying the council violated state environmental laws and growth management regulations.

Nelson's tenure as Council President has been criticized as encouraging a toxic culture of bullying within the Council. Upon resigning her seat on the City Council in December 2024, former City Councilmember Tammy Morales alleged that Council leadership "eroded our checks and balances as a Legislative department and undermined my work as a policymaker." Morales stated in an interview that under Nelson, the Seattle City Council "is sliding towards really undemocratic behavior." Nelson denied the allegations, stating, "I'm frankly shocked and disappointed with the way she has characterized the dynamic on Council and what occurs at the dais."

== Personal life ==
Nelson met her husband at the Seattle WTO protests in 1999. She and her family live in the Green Lake neighborhood. Nelson is a recovering alcoholic and has been sober since September 2020.

== Electoral history ==
=== 2017 election ===
Seattle City Council Position 8, Primary Election 2017
| Party | Candidate | Votes | % |
|---|---|---|---|
| Nonpartisan | Teresa Mosqueda | 53,676 | 31.59% |
| Nonpartisan | Jon Grant | 45,653 | 26.87% |
| Nonpartisan | Sara Nelson | 36,495 | 21.48% |
| Nonpartisan | Rudy Pantoja | 8,704 | 5.12% |
| Nonpartisan | Sheley Secrest | 8,467 | 4.98% |
| Nonpartisan | Charlene D. Strong | 7,562 | 4.45% |
| Nonpartisan | Hisam Goueli | 5,407 | 3.18% |
| Nonpartisan | Mac McGregor | 3,444 | 2.03% |
| Nonpartisan | Write-in | 486 | 0.29% |
| Turnout | | 187,741 | 40.49% |
| Registered electors | | 463,660 | |

=== 2021 election ===
Seattle City Council Position 9, Primary Election 2021
| Party | Candidate | Votes | % |
|---|---|---|---|
| Nonpartisan | Nikkita Oliver | 79,799 | 40.18% |
| Nonpartisan | Sara Nelson | 78,388 | 39.47% |
| Nonpartisan | Brianna K. Thomas | 26,651 | 13.42% |
| Nonpartisan | Corey Eichner | 7,030 | 3.54% |
| Nonpartisan | Lindsay McHaffie | 3,048 | 1.53% |
| Nonpartisan | Rebecca L. Williamson | 1,646 | 0.83% |
| Nonpartisan | Xtian Gunther | 1,409 | 0.71% |
| Nonpartisan | Write-in | 637 | 0.32% |
| Turnout | | 198,608 | 40.24% |
| Registered electors | | 493,453 | |

Seattle City Council Position 9, General Election 2021
| Party | Candidate | Votes | % |
|---|---|---|---|
| Nonpartisan | Sara Nelson | 139,336 | 53.84% |
| Nonpartisan | Nikkita Oliver | 119,025 | 45.99% |
| Nonpartisan | Write-in | 437 | 0.17% |
| Turnout | | 258,798 | 52.81% |
| Registered electors | | 489,996 | |

=== 2025 election ===
2025 Seattle City Council 9th district primary election
| Candidate | Votes | % |
|---|---|---|
| Dionne Foster | 110,636 | 58.44% |
| Sara Nelson (incumbent) | 66,909 | 35.34% |
| Mia Jacobson | 5,845 | 3.09% |
| Connor Nash | 5,532 | 2.92% |
| Write-in | 393 | 0.21% |
| Total votes | 189,315 | 100.00% |

2025 Seattle City Council 9th district general election
| Candidate | Votes | % |
|---|---|---|
| Dionne Foster | 165,930 | 62.80% |
| Sara Nelson (incumbent) | 97,710 | 36.98% |
| Write-in | 579 | 0.22% |
| Total votes | 264,219 | 100.00% |
