= Mark Solomon (American politician) =

American politician

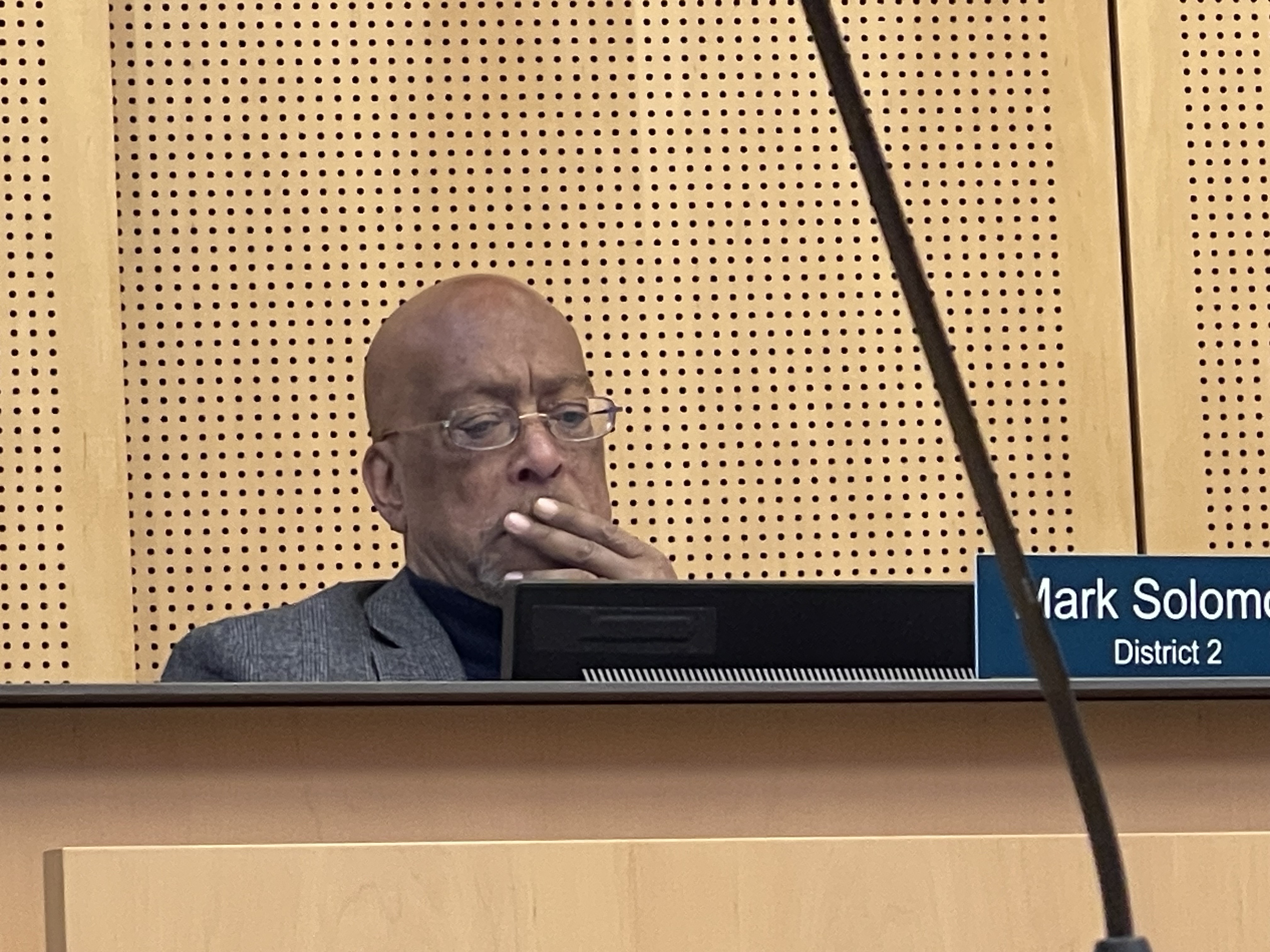
- Mark Solomon 2025

Member of the Seattle City Council from the 2nd district
- In office January 27, 2025 – November 25, 2025
- Preceded by: Tammy Morales
- Succeeded by: Eddie Lin

Personal details
- Party: Democratic
- Education: Seattle University (BA)

Military service
- Allegiance: United States of America
- Branch/service: United States Air Force
- Years of service: 1983 - 2012
- Rank: Lieutenant Colonel

Mark Solomon is an American politician and bureaucrat from Seattle, Washington. He was appointed to the Seattle City Council in January 2025, serving until late November of that same year.

== Early life and education ==
Solomon was born in Seattle, Washington and lived in the Beacon Hill neighborhood. He graduated from Seattle University then served seven years in the United States Air Force as an intelligence analyst. Solomon then left active duty and moved back to Seattle and became a Crime Prevention Coordinator at the Seattle Police Department and a reservist at Joint Base Lewis–McChord.

== Seattle City Council ==
=== 2019 election ===
In 2019, Solomon announced he would run for Seattle City Council in District 2 after the incumbent Bruce Harrell announced he would not seek reelection. Mayor Jenny Durkan endorsed Solomon before the primary and accused his opponent, community organizer Tammy Morales, of being a socialist. In the August primary, Solomon came in second with 23%, advancing to the general election with Morales, who came in first with 50%.

Solomon focused his campaign on public safety, highlighting his experience in policing and efforts to prevent displacement in neighborhoods. Morales focused her campaign on fighting the impacts of systemic racism and supported a head tax for Seattle corporations, legislation opposed by Amazon. The election received national attention after Amazon donated $1.45 million to candidates in response to Morales and other candidates support of a head tax. Solomon received $30,000 from the Amazon backed PAC.

In the November general election, Morales defeated Solomon, 60.47% to 39.08%.

=== 2025 appointment ===
In December 2024, Tammy Morales announced she would resign from the Seattle City Council on January 1, 2025, citing bullying and gaslighting from her fellow councilmembers. Solomon was one of six finalists for the appointment, and after five rounds of voting, Solomon was appointed on January 27, 2025. He stated he would not run in the November general election to fill the seat for the rest of the term because he did not want to be "distracted by trying to do the work and running to keep the job."

== Electoral history ==
=== 2019 election ===
Seattle City Council District 2, Primary Election 2019
Party	Candidate	Votes	%
Nonpartisan	Tammy Morales	10,630	50.07%
Nonpartisan	Mark Solomon	4,923	23.19%
Nonpartisan	Ari Hoffman	2,451	11.54%
Nonpartisan	Phyllis Porter	1,254	5.91%
Nonpartisan	Chris Peguero	1,000	4.71%
Nonpartisan	Omari Tahir-Garrett	607	2.86%
Nonpartisan	Henry Dennison	304	1.43%
Nonpartisan	Write-in	61	0.29%
Turnout		22,172	37.80%
Registered electors		58,655	

Seattle City Council District 2, General Election 2019
Party	Candidate	Votes	%
Nonpartisan	Tammy Morales	16,379	60.47%
Nonpartisan	Mark Solomon	10,586	39.08%
Nonpartisan	Write-in	121	0.45%
Turnout		28,400	47.82%
Registered electors		59,389	
