= Sharon Maeda =

American activist and feminist

- Born: 1945 (age 80–81); Milwaukee, Wisconsin
- Known for: Asian-American activist

Sharon Maeda is an American activist and feminist. She was executive director of Pacifica Radio from 1980–1986, and held a White House post in 1994 assisting Doris Matsui as a liaison to the Asian-American community.

== Early life and education ==
Maeda was born in Milwaukee, Wisconsin. Her parents and grandparents, Japanese Americans, were interned in Minidoka internment camp during World War II. She grew up in Portland, Oregon. The family moved to Seattle in 1956.

She attended the University of Washington.

== Career ==
In 1980 Maeda became the executive director of Pacifica Radio, a position she held until 1986. She founded a management consulting company, Spectra Communications, dedicated to helping clients reflect a more multicultural society, in 1987. In 1993 she was appointed by Housing and Urban Development secretary Henry Cisneros to work as a community outreach officer for lead-based paint. In 1995 she began work with Doris Matsui as a liaison with Asian groups around the country.

In 2000, as Director of Communications for the United Methodist Church in New York, she became involved in the Elian Gonzales international custody fight and worked to reunite Elian with his father in Cuba.
