= The Urbanist =

Seattle blog about city design and transit

The Urbanist is a web publication that focuses on new urbanism, rapid transit, bicycling, and city planning in the Pacific Northwest region with a focus on Seattle. The blog is operated as a non-profit 501(c) organization, was founded in 2014, and has operated a podcast since 2022. The podcast sometimes airs on KVRU-LP 105.7FM. Groups who have written opinion pieces include Habitat for Humanity and Seattle YIMBY. Guest writers who have written opinion pieces include Seattle Mayor Katie Wilson, Toshiko Hasegawa, and Mark Mullet.

== Views ==
The Urbanist approaches urban design from a progressive perspective and makes regular endorsements for elections from local to federal. The blog regularly encourages North America to learn from countries with more developed public transit, public squares, cycling, and third places.
