= Dan Strauss =

American politician (born 1986)

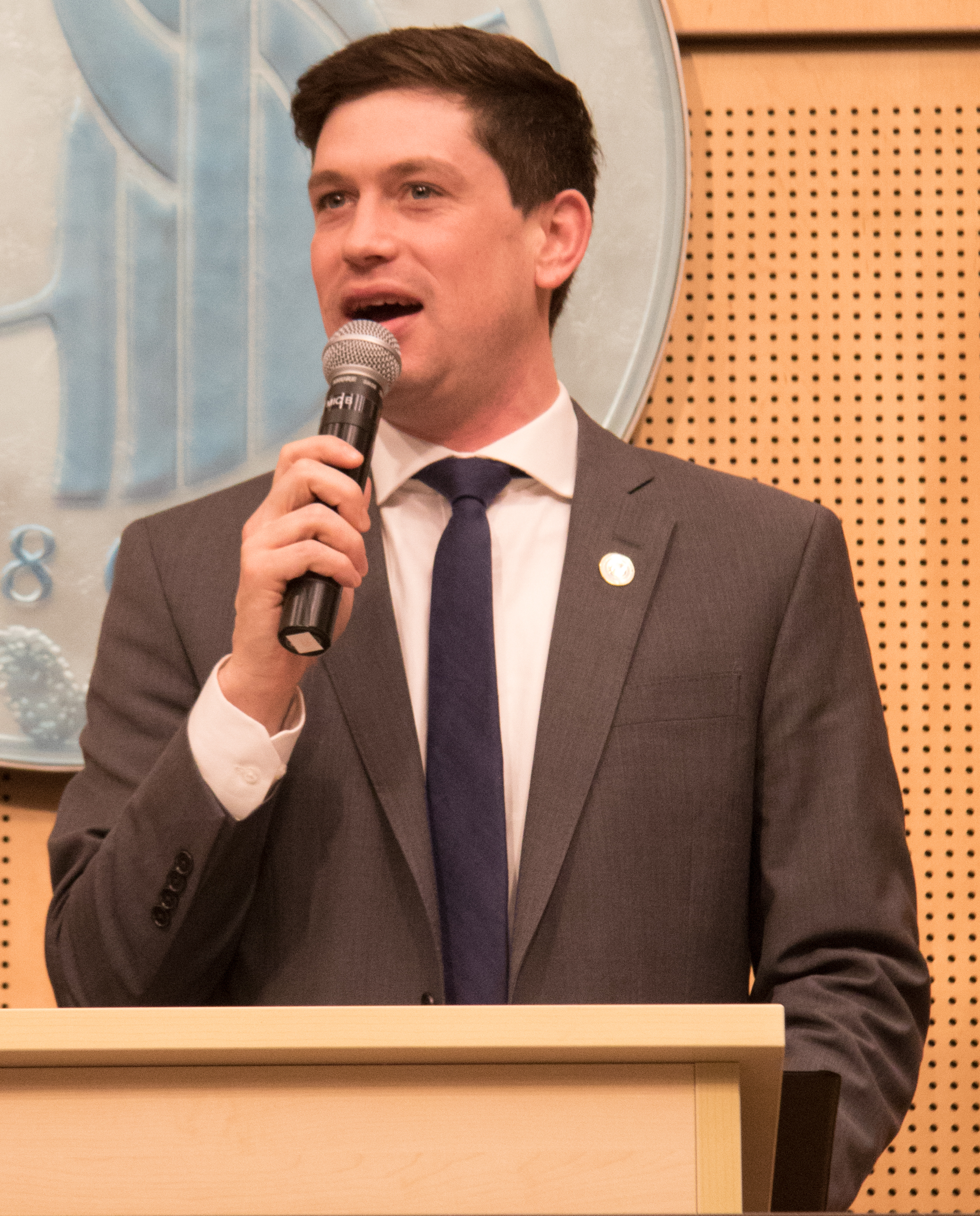

Member of the Seattle City Council from District 6
- Incumbent
- Assumed office January 6, 2020
- Preceded by: Mike O'Brien

Personal details
- Born: Daniel Aaron Strauss; April 12, 1986 (age 40) Seattle, Washington, U.S.
- Party: Democratic
- Education: Whittier College (BA); University of Oregon (MPA)

Daniel Aaron Strauss (born April 12, 1986) is an American politician who serves on the Seattle City Council from District 6. A native of Seattle's Ballard neighborhood, he previously worked as an aide to local politicians, including Seattle councilmember Sally Bagshaw.

== Early life and career ==
Strauss was born in the Ballard neighborhood of Seattle to a Jewish family of social workers and graduated from Nathan Hale High School. After high school, he joined the National Civilian Community Corps. Strauss graduated with a degree in political science from Whittier College, where he was elected student body president. He then attended the University of Oregon, where he also worked as a policy intern for Oregon state representative Nancy Nathanson, graduating in 2012 with a Master of Public Administration.

After graduating from college, Strauss returned to Seattle and worked as an aide to several local politicians. He was part of the campaign team for Snohomish County councilman Dave Somers during his 2013 reelection. He then worked as a legislative assistant for State Senator David Frockt before working for the Alliance for Gun Responsibility. From 2017 to 2019, he served as a legislative assistant to Seattle councilmember Sally Bagshaw.

== Seattle City Council ==
=== 2019 election ===
Strauss announced his candidacy for the District 6 seat in February 2019, shortly before incumbent councilmember Mike O'Brien announced that he would not seek re-election. He finished first out of 13 candidates in the primary election, with 34 percent of the vote, and advanced to the general election alongside former city councilmember Heidi Wills. Strauss ran as a progressive in the race and was endorsed by the King County Labor Council and The Stranger. The election gained national attention after Amazon spent nearly $1.5 million on campaign contributions to Seattle Metropolitan Chamber of Commerce Political Action Committee, which spent more than $400,000 supporting Willis.

Strauss won with 55.65% of the vote and was sworn in on December 22, 2019, at a Ballard Centennial Bell Tower ceremony.

=== 2023 election ===
In February 2023, Strauss announced he would seek a second term in office. In the August primary, he face five challengers and came in first with 51.76% of the vote and Pete Hanning, executive director for the Fremont Chamber of Commerce, came in second with 29.34%. In the general election, Strauss and Hanning disagreed on most issues, with Hanning running as more of a moderate compared to Strauss. Hanning criticized Strauss' for his support of defunding the Seattle Police Department budget by 50%, and for "flip-flopping" to then supporting SPD. Strauss distanced himself from defund rhetoric, and called his support "a mistake."

In the general election, Strauss defeated Hanning, 52.31% to 47.19%.

=== Tenure ===
Strauss is the chair of the Land Use and Neighborhoods Committee in his first term on the council. At the beginning of his term, he supported policies that reduced government regulations to help small businesses during the COVID-19 pandemic, including expanding street cafes and suspending regulations on at-home businesses. During the George Floyd protests, Strauss supported cutting the Seattle Police budget by 50%, which he would later reverse, calling his support "a mistake."

During his second term, Strauss was the budget committee chair and had to oversee a severe budget shortfall. He would propose a "balanced package," which passed, sparring cuts to popular programs, like the Seattle Channel, but relied on pulling funds from the city's Jumpstart tax.

== Electoral history ==
=== 2019 election ===
City of Seattle, City Council, District 6, 2019 Primary Election
Party	Candidate	Votes	%
Nonpartisan	Dan Strauss	11,328	34.15%
Nonpartisan	Heidi Wills	7,048	21.25%
Nonpartisan	Sergio García	4,730	14.26%
Nonpartisan	Jay Fathi	4,367	13.16%
Nonpartisan	Kate Martin	1,137	3.43%
Nonpartisan	Jon Lisbin	1,063	3.20%
Nonpartisan	Jeremy Cook	829	2.50%
Nonpartisan	Melissa Hall	820	2.47%
Nonpartisan	Ed Pottharst	599	1.81%
Nonpartisan	John Peeples	452	1.36%
Nonpartisan	Joey Massa	299	0.90%
Nonpartisan	Terry Rice	287	0.87%
Nonpartisan	Kara Ceriello	146	0.44%
Nonpartisan	Write-in	67	0.20%
Turnout		34,207	

Seattle City Council District 6, 2019 General Election
Party	Candidate	Votes	%
Nonpartisan	Dan Strauss	23,868	55.68%
Nonpartisan	Heidi Wills	18,799	43.83%
Nonpartisan	Write-in	221	0.52%
Turnout		44,399	59.37%
Registered electors		74,785	

=== 2023 election ===
City of Seattle, City Council, District 6, 2023 Primary Election
Party	Candidate	Votes	%
Nonpartisan	Dan Strauss	15,869	51.76%
Nonpartisan	Pete Hanning	8,996	29.34%
Nonpartisan	Shea Wilson	1,900	6.20%
Nonpartisan	Dale Kutzera	1,383	4.51%
Nonpartisan	Victoria Palmer	1,355	4.42%
Nonpartisan	Jon Lisbin	1,016	3.31%
Nonpartisan	Write-in	140	0.46%
Turnout		31,372	40.57%
Registered electors		77,322	

Seattle City Council District 6, General Election 2023
Party	Candidate	Votes	%
Nonpartisan	Dan Strauss	20,601	52.31%
Nonpartisan	Pete Hanning	18,586	47.19%
Nonpartisan	Write-in	199	0.51%
Turnout		40,537	52.35%
Registered electors		77,438	
