= King County Labor Council =

Union decision-making body in King County, Washington

The Martin Luther King Jr. County Labor Council (MLKCLC) is the central body of labor organizations in King County, Washington. The MLKCLC is affiliated with the national AFL–CIO, the central labor organization in the United States, which represents more than 13 million working people. Over 125 organizations are affiliated with the MLKCLC, and more than 75,000 workers belong to Council-affiliated organizations. In addition to supporting labor organizations, it acts as a voice for the interests and needs of the working people in King County, WA.

== Mission statement ==
The core responsibilities of the MLKCLC are to assist workers and their unions in the struggle for social and economic justice; support efforts to organize and bargain fair contracts; lobby, endorse and involve working people in the political process; advocate and support laws that protect working people; support community services outreach work; and unite with community allies who are also struggling for justice.

== Early years, 1888–1903 ==
In 1888, the West Central Labor Union (WCLU) was organized by its first president, O.F. Wegener, in Seattle, Washington. The WCLU is the first of many names the council has adopted over the years. Despite being a union itself, the WCLU represented almost every trade and labor union in the area including the Knights of Labor Assembly and the Miners Unions of Newcastle, Cedar Mountain and Renton.

One of the many ways the WCLU promoted their cause of workers' rights was through Labor Day Parades held on Labor Day. The parades represented every trade union of Seattle with AFL and Knights of Labor leaders' pictures displayed throughout the parade. [Central] Along with Labor Day Parades, the WCLU advocated for workers by obtaining direct control over its newspaper the Union Record in 1903 by buying it from its publisher. The Union Record was the "official organ" of the WCLU and it strived to exclude politics, emphasizing that it was "not a socialist paper."

In 1891 Oregon Improvement Co. brought in hundreds of black laborers from the South into various mining towns in King County to break labor disputes. The Miners Unions responded by appealing to the WLCU for moral and financial support. In spite of strong support the mine owners prevailed in large part due to the economic depression at the time. [Central] As a result of this defeat, the Knights of Labor and trade unions in the WLCU went into a period of decline.

Although the WCLU aimed at promoting fair labor by operating its own employment referral "hiring hall," in 1893 public criticism of this effort arose centered around complaints of excessive fees and fictitious jobs. This criticism prompted the WCLU to collaborate with the unorganized workers which, along with W.G. Armstrong of the Typographers Union, worked to pass an ordinance by the city council which established the free employment bureau. [Central] The bureau was solidified by the charter provision and consolidated with the Civil Service Department in 1895. During this time, the charter reelected 15 freeholders from organized labor and addressed eight-hour work days and safety inspection of boilers in the work place.

The late 1800s and early 1900s saw a growth in the organization and an increase in union memberships. In 1900 several new unions – Cooks and Waitresses Union, Barbers Union, Leather Workers Union and Telephone Operators Union – were organized and joined the WCLU. Due to the growth, $14,000 was raised to build a new Labor Temple in Seattle, Washington. [Central] Mainstay unions of the WCLU at this time were the Sailors, Brewery Workers, Cigarmakers, Tailors, Stonecutters, Typographers, Iron Molders, Stage Employees, Musicians, Bricklayers, Printing Pressmen and Newsboys unions.

== SCLC 1905–1919 ==
In 1905 the WCLU changed its name to the Central Labor Council of Seattle and Vicinity, which was often called the Seattle Central Labor Council (SCLC) or simply the Central Labor Council. The council was a key supporter of the Populist movement, as represented by the organizing of the People's Party during the rise and fall of the progressive coalition from 1909 to 1917.

In 1914 there labor shortages prompted unions to organize much of Seattle's workforce. The SCLC went through a radical phase which manifested itself as strong support for the progressive coalition. This momentum was lost with the ending of World War I in 1918 and the resulting layoff and economic depression. [AFL–CIO] The layoffs and regressive bargaining by employers post war led the SCLC to call the Seattle General Strike of 1919. The strike had over 65,000 Seattle workers walk out, and was heavily supported by the American Federation of Labor (AFL) and the Industrial Workers of the World (IWW). Fears that the strike was a radical effort to destabilize and overthrow the government doomed the strike, causing the AFL to pressure leaders to end the strike. A lack of common vision in terms of the goals of the strike is typically credited as the reason the strike failed to achieve the progressive reforms envisioned by the organizers.

After the end of the Strike, employers organized an open-shop drive that de-unionized most of King County. The rise of more centrist labor elements post-strike led to power struggles within the SCLC that culminated in a vote to expel several of the more radical IWW activists. The Council became more conservative and eventually began to "tread the line of Craft Unionism". This resulted in a decline of membership.

=== Conservative influence, 1920–1955 ===
From 1920 to 1955 only AFL-affiliated unions were represented by the SCLC. During this phase there was a considerable conservative influence from Dave Beck, a prominent Teamster on the West Coast and eventual President of the International Brotherhood of Teamsters (IBT). Although he was instrumental in rebuilding the strength of organized labor in Seattle, his conservative business unionism approach was very different from the council's previous radical ideologies.

During the Great Depression, many workers favored Beck's conservative style over the more progressive politics of the Congress of Industrial Organizations (CIO). As a result, Seattle was an anti-radical, closed shop, AFL town. Throughout Beck's influence, the SCLC stayed away from politics and only endorsed "moderate pro-labor Democrats," rejecting leftist coalitions.

== Reentry into local politics, 1955–1960s ==
In 1955 the AFL and CIO merged, which greatly expanded the SCLC bringing the CIO's more politically active approach to the council. During this time, the council combated statewide "Right-to-Work" open shop efforts enabled by passage of the national Taft-Hartley Act of 1947. The SCLC was a leading player in the defeat of these measures. [AFL–CIO]

In response to Right to Work attacks the SCLC started a "pro-labor public relations campaign" in 1959. The campaign was a way for labor leaders to get their voice heard by using radio and television medians. It also donated to many charities and became involved in other civic activities. [AFL–CIO]

By 1968, the Seattle Central Labor Council changed its name to King County Labor Council (KCLC).

In 1961, Chet Ramage, Executive Secretary-Treasurer of the King County Labor Council led an effort to allow Sunday liquor sales by banning the Washington 1909 "blue law", which outlaws the sale of liquor on Sundays. In spite of a robust campaign, the legislature took no action based on opposing letters and telegrams. The proposal raised awareness about race, collective bargaining and politics.

Although the KCLC had reentered more progressive local politics, there was still some remnants of business unionism facilitating a no-strike agreement for the construction and operation of the facilities for 1962 World's Fair. [AFL–CIO] There were threats to strike the Fair, dubbed the Century 21 Exposition, because the concessionaires, exhibitors and departments resisted protected labor activism among their employees.

In 1964 the KCLC's political arm, the "Committee on Political Education", was very effective in local elections. The growth of the public sector unions and the addition of progressive CIO unions saw it back expanded social services and public housing proposals. Seattle civil rights groups were eventually supported by the Council in the 1960s, as well. [AFL-CIO]

The Scanner, a biweekly labor newspaper, was born on August 30, 1968. The KCLC published the newspaper and distributed it to its 138 AFL-CIO affiliated unions and reached about 75,000 people on average. Its purpose was to keep members informed on union actions and it was known for advertising union businesses. A special feature of the newspaper included the KCLC's regular list of businesses to boycott. The Scanner was heavily involved in politics and often endorsed candidates from the Democratic Party. With the emergence of the electronic communication age, publication of The Scanner ended in 1992.

== 1970s ==
During the 1970s the KCLC grew more and more pro-active on progressive labor rights. They urged and sanctioned many strikes throughout the King County area. In 1971 a radical resolution was passed by the delegate body empowering the KCLC to call for a national one-day strike against President Richard Nixon because of what it believed to be his unfair and unworkable labor policies. Although that proposal did not result in a national work stoppage, the KCLC moved to address a festering local issue by sanctioning the first teachers strike in Washington, led by American Federation of Teachers (AFT) members at Seattle Community College in 1972.

In 1974 the Arab Oil Embargo and subsequent worldwide oil shortage spurred then Executive Secretary Treasurer James K. Bender to threaten a citywide strike because unregulated gasoline distribution could lead to shortages that would prevent workers from getting to work.

In 1975 the James K. Bender created a food bank and giving program for union members.

The KCLC continued to be involved in various strikes for workers' rights such as the Custodians strike of 1975, and the sanctioning of the second Seattle Community College strike of 1976.

=== 1980s ===
The KCLC strengthened their stance on pro-labor rights when they actively supported the Hotel and Restaurant Employees strike of 1981. Twenty-one restaurants and hotels were affected around the greater Seattle area. The Council urged all of its members to honor picket lines, while offering strike benefits, as well. An estimated 2000–3000 restaurant employees and 5000 hotel employees walked out in a demand for higher wages.

In 1984, the council's 50,000 union members were asked to oppose levies proposed by the Seattle School District to show support for school custodians and other union workers who had been working for two years without a contract. The proposed levies included a $69.5 million two-year operating levy and a $64 million, six-year levy for capital improvements.

The KCLC supported the players strike against the National Football League in 1987. Then Executive Secretary Treasurer Dan Bickford urged a protest against NFL Seattle Seahawks games that used strike replacement players. Bickford affirmed that the same issues other unions face: "worker rights, fair treatment, fair share of revenues and the right to bargain and speak without reprisal" were issues that every working person faced.

In July 1989 the media highlighted KCLC's refusal to make a political candidate endorsement based on the pro-choice abortion issue. Women's rights advocates urged organized labor's support for the upcoming elections. However, the KCLC took a more conservative position that pro-choice issues were not labor issues.

That same month, the KCLC asked its members to not cross picket lines of nurses belonging to Washington's largest health care provider, Group Health. The strike centered on pay and proper staffing levels. It was reported that 95% of the hospital's nurses went on strike.

== 1990s ==
In 1991 the KCLC, and its 85,000 members, opposed a project by the Seattle School Board called Step Forward. The project's purpose was designed to promote school leadership and public education which was established by CEOs from Safeco, Boeing and other large corporations. However, KCLC President Dale Daugherty deemed Step Forward as "the attempt of business to seize control of the School Board and turn it into a board that functions like boards of directors of corporations." The KCLC stated that many of those same corporations, like Boeing, have been against tax laws that would benefit public education. A coalition in opposition to this effort was formed by the KCLC, called "Public in Public Education". Its focus emphasized funding for schools and education reform.

Two months later, the KCLC threatened a boycott of Nordstrom, a popular local clothing store seeking to expand out of its Seattle base, after an internal battle between the company and United Food and Commercial Workers Union Local 1001. The union instituted a negative publicity campaign against Nordstrom based on unfair worker treatment that included a class-action lawsuit claiming that workers were forced to work "off the clock" – uncompensated hours. However, the union was decertified in an election when Nordstrom employees voted against union representation.

In 1993, during the KCLC's Labor Day picnic, a yearly institution that had replaced the annual Labor Day Parade, Washington Governor Mike Lowry expressed his support for the North American Free Trade Agreement (NAFTA). NAFTA was widely opposed by the U.S. labor movement and Lowry's announcement was not well received. The agreement proposed to allow the free movement of goods, services and investments between the United States, Canada and Mexico without restrictions. Labor's position in opposition centered on concerns relating to a wage "race to the bottom" if the higher wage U.S. economy was forced to compete directly with the relatively low wages of Mexico.

In 1997, the KCLC sponsored a rally by the Washington apple workers with a demand for higher wages and better working conditions. The Teamsters and the United Farm Workers unions were heavily involved in the rally. Other sponsors included Jobs With Justice, the Washington Association of Churches and the Washington Alliance for Immigrants and Refugee Justice.

In 1997, the King County Labor Agency, AFL-CIO Community Service Division was created as the 501(c)(03) for charity efforts for the KCLC.

In the summer of 1998, the KCLC, along with help from its affiliates created a Seattle Organizing Center (SOC) that aimed at recruiting and training workers looking to organize. The teachers of First Hill Day Care center hoped to use the SOC as a way to finally unionize. While this effort was ultimately unsuccessful, it signaled a growing emphasis by the central labor council in grass roots organizing.

The KCLC developed a Right to Organize Plan in 1999 for the Seattle Unions Now (SUN) program. SUN was a KCLC sponsored organization dedicated to capacity-building, multi-union efforts, ambitious unions and labor campaigns. The Right to Organize Plan focused on mobilizing, community and religious outreach, political accountability and organizing contingent workers.

On November 30, 1999, the KCLC was a key player in a nationwide historical event, the protests of the World Trade Organization Ministerial Conference (WTO). The protests set for the Washington Trade and Convention Center in Seattle sought to emphasize 21st century free trade as promoted by the supporters of economic globalization, the World Bank and the International Monetary Fund (IMF). A broad coalition of progressive activists protested the larger effects of globalization in terms of issues like environmental protection and animal rights issues. The KCLC, along with many other pro-labor groups, voiced its concerns on "forced labor and substandard working conditions in developing countries, where increasing numbers of U.S. corporations were relocating to take advantage of cheap labor." The environmentalists and pro-labor activists protested side by side facing very aggressive law enforcement tactics that included the used tear gas and curfews. Then KCLC Executive Secretary Treasurer Ron Judd, established a "Hate Free Zone" at the Seattle Labor Temple in the downtown Belltown neighborhood as a place where protesters would not be harassed by law enforcement.

== 2000–2020 ==
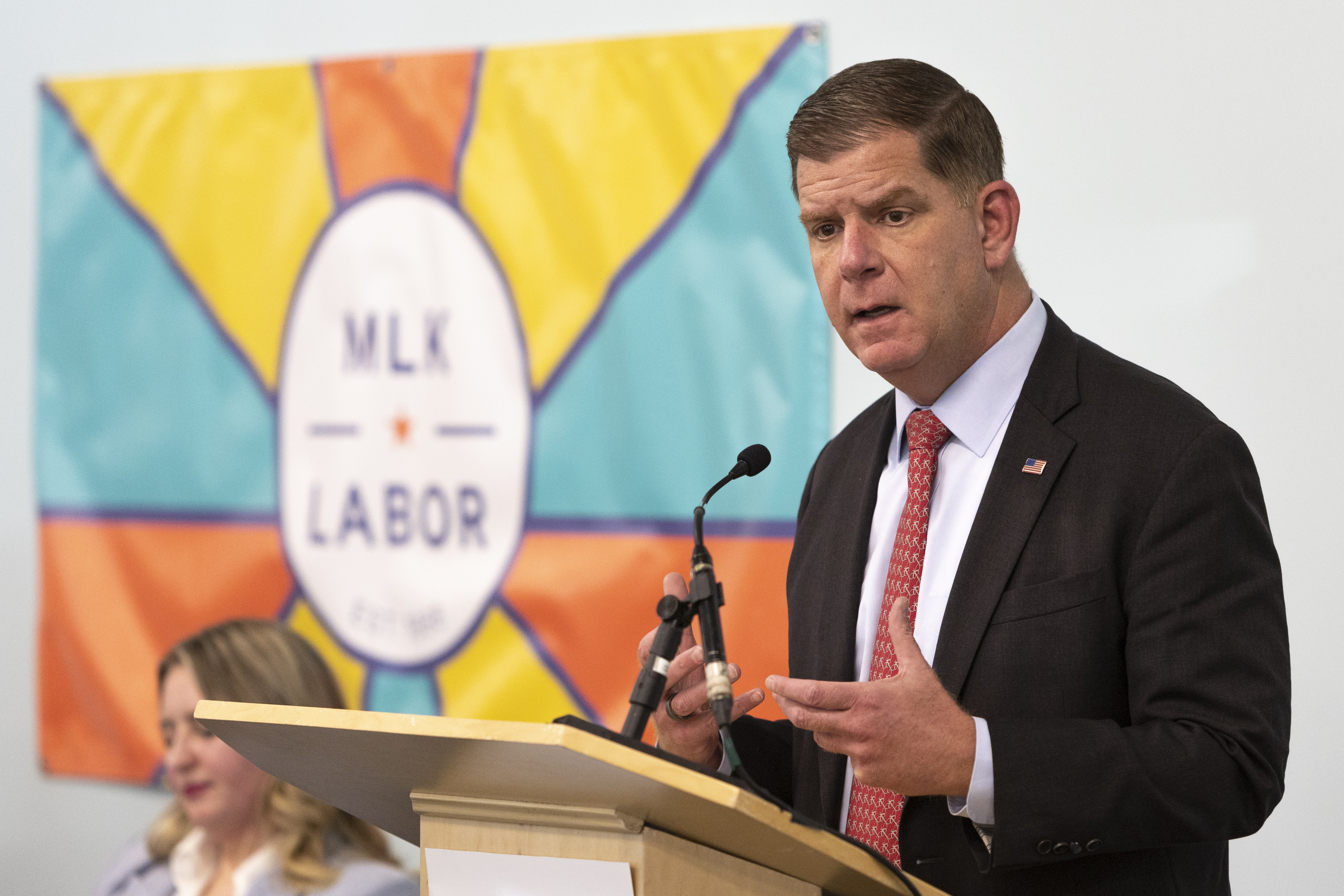
Marty Walsh, United States secretary of labor, speaks at a council event in 2022

The first major labor action in the new century occurred in 2000 when the KCLC actively supported aerospace giant Boeing's striking engineers and technicians as represented by the then unaffiliated Society of Professional Engineering Employees in Aerospace (SPEEA). The KCLC's affiliated AFL–CIO unions joined with SPEEA during a 31-day strike against Boeing. As a result of the success of the strike SPEEA affiliated with the International Professional and Technical Employees Union and the KCLC.

By 2003 the issue of immigrant rights came to the fore with then KCLC Executive Secretary Steve Williamson, voicing his support of the "Immigrant Workers Freedom Ride"' – a bus trip of immigration activists from all over the U.S. to Washington, D.C. The KCLC by then had helped establish the nonprofit "Hate Free Zone Campaign of Washington" leveraging the success associated with the Hate Free Zone WTO effort into a new organization devoted to advocating for immigrant rights.

In 2005 the KCLC joined a Seattle protest against the War in Iraq. This 5,000-strong protest mirrored a much larger protest in Washington, D.C., on September 24, 2005. The nation's capitol protest included tens of thousands of anti-war activists.

In 2005 the KCLC changed its name to the "Martin Luther King Jr. County Labor Council" (MLKCLC).

In 2005 the KCLC charity division changed the name "King County Labor Agency (Community Service Division)" to the "Puget Sound Labor Agency AFL-CIO" (PSLA). The KCLC, food bank was known as one of Seattle's first food banks dating back to 1975.

In 2006 the MLKCLC elected the current Executive Secretary, David Freiboth, who formerly served as the national president of the Inlandboatmen's Union of the Pacific for 12 years and had served as the Maritime Trades representative to the MLKCLC Executive Board. Prior executive secretary, Steve Williamson left the council to join United Food and Commercial Workers Local 21.

The MLKCLC's 2006 Labor Day picnic was covered by Seattle P-I reporter who interviewed labor leaders on the declining membership of unions, not only nationwide, but statewide, as well. Although 19% of Washington's workforce is unionized, across the nation only 12.5% of workers belong to a union. Labor leaders expressed a need for the renewal of organized labor tactics.

In 2009 the MLKCLC supported the Metropolitan King County Council's decision to enact a "don’t ask" immigration law that prevents illegal immigrants from being forced to tell their immigration status when seeking public-health services or when dealing with sheriff's deputies. The King County Council said it was to discourage racial profiling and decrease the fear of seeking health care.

On June 17, 2020, MLKCLC delegates voted to expel the Seattle Police Officers Guild from the organization.

== Archives ==
- King County Labor Council of Washington Records. 1889–2012. 38.26 cubic ft. (58 boxes).
  - AFL-CIO King County Labor Council of Washington Provisional Trades Section minutes. 1935–1971. .42 cubic feet(1 box) (58 boxes).
- The World Trade Organization 1999 Seattle Ministerial Conference Protest Collection 1993–2000. 43.63 cubic feet.
- Jonathan Rosenblum Papers. 1993–2006. 1 cubic foot (1 box). Contains records about the Union Cities Campaign, King County Labor Council, AFL-CIO from 1996 to 1997.
