= Tammy Morales =

American politician (born 1968)

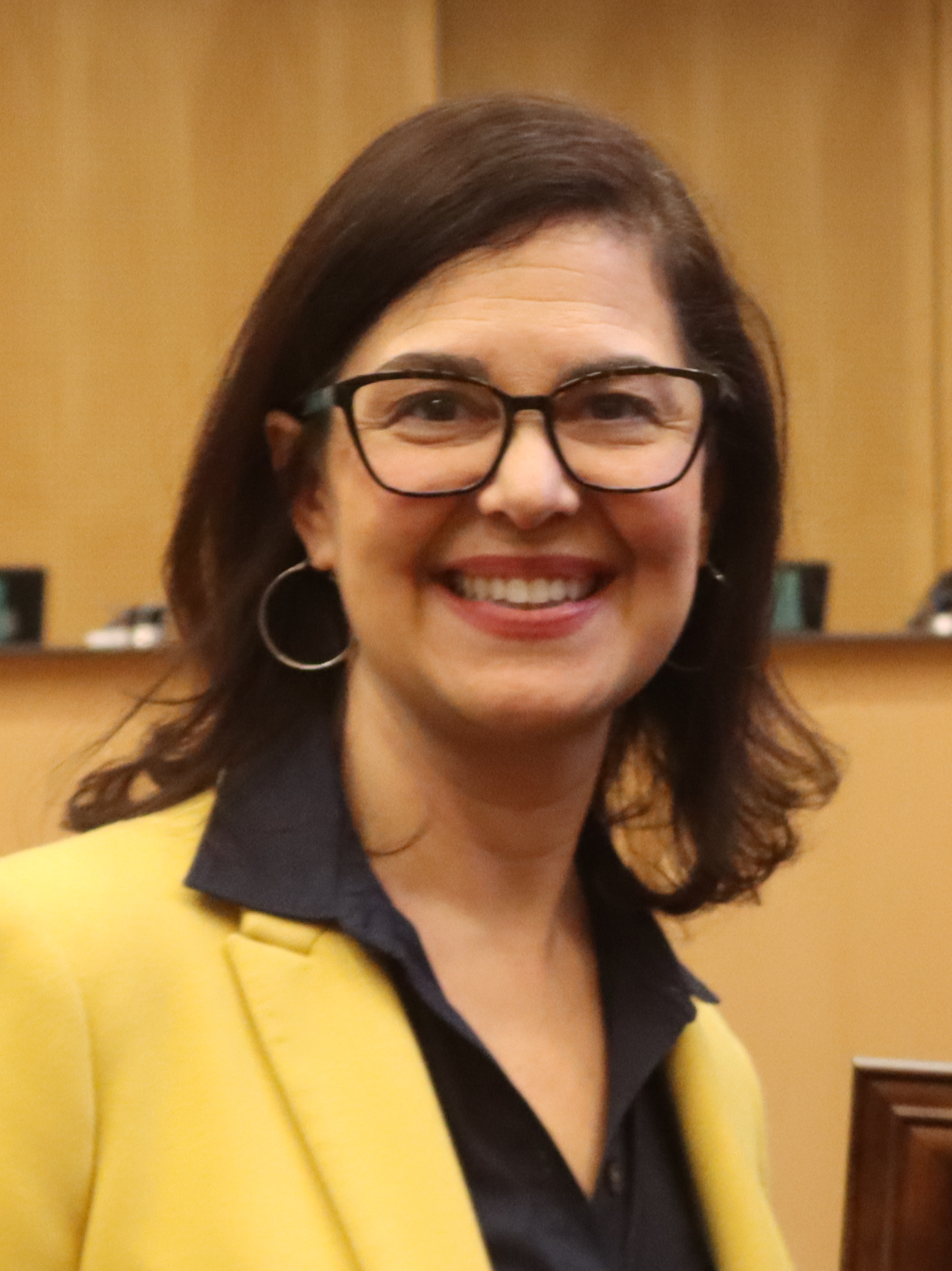
- Morales in 2024

Member of the Seattle City Council from District 2
- In office January 6, 2020 – January 6, 2025
- Preceded by: Bruce Harrell
- Succeeded by: Mark Solomon

Personal details
- Born: October 23, 1968 (age 57)
- Party: Democratic
- Other political affiliations: Democratic Socialists of America (former)
- Spouse: Harry Teicher
- Education: University of Texas at San Antonio (BA); University of Texas at Austin (MS)

Tammy Janine Morales (born October 23, 1968) is an American politician from Seattle, Washington. She was elected to represent District 2 on the Seattle City Council in November 2019.

In December 2024, Morales announced she would be stepping down from the Seattle City Council on January 6, citing a hostile work environment from the rest of the council.

== Early life and education ==
Morales was raised in San Antonio, Texas by a single mother who worked two jobs. Morales attended the University of Texas at San Antonio, where she earned a Bachelor of Arts in Anthropology and later earned a Master of Science in Community and Regional Planning from the University of Texas at Austin.

== Career ==
Morales served as Legislative Director for a state legislator in the Texas House of Representatives, where she worked with state agencies and advocates to develop legislation on TANF initiatives, childcare funding, and low-income housing. Morales then worked as a budget and policy analyst for the New York City Independent Budget Office, where she focused on children's service agencies.

Morales moved to Seattle in 2000 and worked for nonprofits focused on community development. Morales later started a consulting firm providing public policy research and advocacy, especially in food access with clients such as the City of Seattle Office of Sustainability and Environment and Seattle-King County Public Health.

Morales completed a two-year term as a Human Rights Commissioner for the City of Seattle in July 2019 and also served on the board of the Rainier Beach Action Coalition.

== Seattle City Council ==
=== 2015 election ===
In 2015, Morales ran for Seattle city council in District 2 against two-term incumbent Bruce Harrell. In the August primary, Morales came in a distant second of three candidates with 24.66%, and Harrell coming in first with 61.72%. In the general election, Morales lost to Harrell by 344 votes.

=== 2019 election ===
In January 2019, Morales declared her candidacy for Seattle City Council District 2 and received an endorsement from U.S. Rep. Pramila Jayapal of Seattle, who co-chairs the Congressional Progressive Caucus. The next day, Harrell announced he would not run for re-election. During the primary, Mayor Jenny Durkan, in an email to supporters, called Morales a "socialist" — Morales's political affiliation is Democrat — and endorsed Mark Solomon, a crime prevention specialist. In the August primary, Morales came in first among seven challengers with 50.07%, with Solomon coming in second with 23.19%.

Morales focused her campaign on social justice issues, like expanding affordable housing and childcare. She also supported a head tax for Seattle corporations, legislation opposed by Amazon, and that in 2018 Seattle City Council approved then quickly rescinded. Morales, along with incumbents Lisa Herbold and Kshama Sawant, received national attention when Amazon donated $1.45 million to support opposing candidates via the Seattle Metropolitan Chamber of Commerce's political action committee, the Civic Alliance for a Sound Economy (CASE).

Morales won the 2019 general election with 60.47% of the vote to Solomon's 39.08%.

=== 2023 election ===
In February 2023, Morales announced that she would run for reelection, focusing her campaign on her progressive accomplishments, such as creating the Jumpstart tax. She faced two challengers, community activist Tanya Woo and Green Party member and disabled veteran Margaret Elisabeth. In the August primary election, Morales and Woo advanced to the general election, with 52% and 42%, respectively.

After the primary, Woo held a press conference with councilmember Sara Nelson and community leaders who all criticized the city's and Morales' response to address the drug use and illegal market that had negatively impacted the Little Saigon neighborhood. Morales responded saying, "...if the chief can reallocate where we what we have right now so that the areas that are needing more attention are getting it that would be great." At a debate, Woo accused Morales of voting to defund the police when she voted on a non-binding resolution, which Morales denied despite her past statements showing support. Morales was critical of Woo's activism around stopping the SoDo shelter expansion due to the lack of shelter beds for homeless individuals.

In the November general election, Morales won 50.65% of the vote to Woo's 49.1%, with a narrow margin of 403 votes.

=== Tenure ===
Morales assumed the office of District 2 Councilmember in January 2020, representing Rainier Beach, Beacon Hill, Chinatown/International District, SODO, and Georgetown. While in office, Morales supported progressive taxes, such as the Jumpstart Tax. She shepherded legislation that would close the just-cause eviction loophole, and secured funding for street sinks, improving sidewalks and a local abortion fund. Morales would vote in favor of a nonbinding resolution that, in part, supported defunding the police and defended her position, saying, "This is about allocating resources in a way that starts to actually serve the community better."

Morales had been criticized by some constituents in the Chinatown International District for a lack of city response to increased crime and homelessness in the neighborhood. In response to the criticism, she pointed to monthly meetings with community leaders and touring the neighborhood, and stated, "I would say absolutely, all levels of government need to be more authentic in their engagement with the CID in particular." In 2024, Morales would be the lone vote against legislation that would create Stay Out of Drug Areas, including one located in the Little Saigon neighborhood, stating it would be ineffective.

In 2024, Morales introduced legislation to the Housing and Human Services Committee to reduce red tape for affordable housing developers, which was voted down in a committee vote. After the vote, Morales said "Despite the fact that everybody’s talking about the need for more affordable housing, when it comes down to it, there’s either no understanding of how we actually get there, or no willingness to really take action." At the next full council meeting, councilmember Cathy Moore accused Morales of calling other councilmembers "evil, corporate shills" and of "The vilification of your fellow council members in the media—it is uncalled for, it is unprofessional." There is no record of Morales calling other councilmembers "evil, corporate shills."

On December 4, 2024, Morales announced she will be resigning from the Seattle City Council effective January 6, 2025, citing and criticizing how the council has been operating. Morales described a "venomous" work culture by her colleagues who she accused of undermining her as a policymaker. She stated, “For all the talk of civility and respecting one another's differences, every time I have expressed a difference of opinion, I've been attacked from the dias. My colleagues have called me lazy, they’ve called me a poor leader, they’ve called me performative. I've been accused of misinforming the public, I’ve been accused of impugning the motives of my colleagues just because I raised a question.”

== Personal life ==
Morales has been a Seattle resident for over 20 years. She has three kids - two in the Seattle Public School system and one at Portland State University. Morales and her family live in Lakewood, near Seward Park.

She is Jewish.

== Electoral history ==
=== 2015 election ===
Seattle City Council District 2, Primary Election 2015
Party	Candidate	Votes	%
Nonpartisan	Bruce Harrell	8,066	61.72%
Nonpartisan	Tammy Morales	3,223	24.66%
Nonpartisan	Josh Farris	1,725	13.20%
Nonpartisan	Write-in	55	0.42%
Turnout		13,258	26.81%
Registered electors		49,450	

Seattle City Council District 2, General Election 2015
Party	Candidate	Votes	%
Nonpartisan	Bruce Harrell	9,532	50.79%
Nonpartisan	Tammy Morales	9,188	48.96%
Nonpartisan	Write-in	46	0.25%
Turnout		19,866	39.74%
Registered electors		49,987	

=== 2019 election ===
Seattle City Council District 2, Primary Election 2019
Party	Candidate	Votes	%
Nonpartisan	Tammy Morales	10,630	50.07%
Nonpartisan	Mark Solomon	4,923	23.19%
Nonpartisan	Ari Hoffman	2,451	11.54%
Nonpartisan	Phyllis Porter	1,254	5.91%
Nonpartisan	Chris Peguero	1,000	4.71%
Nonpartisan	Omari Tahir-Garrett	607	2.86%
Nonpartisan	Henry Dennison	304	1.43%
Nonpartisan	Write-in	61	0.29%
Turnout		22,172	37.80%
Registered electors		58,655	

Seattle City Council District 2, General Election 2019
Party	Candidate	Votes	%
Nonpartisan	Tammy Morales	16,379	60.47%
Nonpartisan	Mark Solomon	10,586	39.08%
Nonpartisan	Write-in	121	0.45%
Turnout		28,400	47.82%
Registered electors		59,389	

=== 2023 election ===
Seattle City Council District 2, Primary Election 2023
Party	Candidate	Votes	%
Nonpartisan	Tammy Morales	10,326	52.28%
Nonpartisan	Tanya Woo	8,406	42.56%
Nonpartisan	Margaret Elisabeth	937	4.74%
Nonpartisan	Write-in	81	0.41%
Turnout		20,156	30.65%
Registered electors		65,763	

Seattle City Council District 2, General Election 2023
Party	Candidate	Votes	%
Nonpartisan	Tammy Morales	13,123	50.65%
Nonpartisan	Tanya Woo	12,270	49.10%
Nonpartisan	Write-in	64	0.25%
Turnout		26,479	40.13%
Registered electors		65,990	
