= Northwest Progressive Institute =

American liberal think tank

- Founder: Andrew Villeneuve
- Established: August 22, 2003
- Mission: To raise America's quality of life through innovative research and imaginative advocacy.
- Focus: Public policy and politics in the Pacific Northwest
- President: Gael Tarleton
- Key people: Martin Chaney; Rob Dolin; Kathleen Reynolds; Steve Zemke; Ralph Gorin; Robert Cruickshank; Rick Hegdahl; Patrick Stickney; Mario Brown; Dominic Barrera; Rennie Sawade; Essie Hicks
- Slogan: "revolutionizing grassroots politics"
- Address: 8201 164th Avenue NE; Redmond, WA 98073-7615; United States
- Location: Redmond, WA, United States
- Website: www.nwprogressive.org

The Northwest Progressive Institute (NPI) is a left-wing think tank based in Redmond, Washington, founded in 2003 and incorporated in 2005. It uses technology, public policy research, and political advocacy to advance progressive causes in the Pacific Northwest region (the states of Washington, Oregon, and Idaho) as well as across the United States. It describes itself as "a netroots powered strategy center working to raise America's quality of life through innovative research and imaginative advocacy."

== History ==
NPI was founded on August 22, 2003, by activist Andrew Villeneuve, who had previously created a site called Permanent Defense in February 2002 to oppose initiatives sponsored by Tim Eyman and other conservatives. Eyman's political action committee at the time was known as Permanent Offense, which was the inspiration for the name Permanent Defense.

Villeneuve's experience working against Tim Eyman's Initiative 776 convinced him that a larger umbrella organization was needed to foster meaningful public dialogue about the long-term well-being of the Pacific Northwest. This realization led Villeneuve to sketch out a plan for an organization with a broader focus.

Since its founding, the organization has launched several online publications, advocated for and against numerous ballot measures, sponsored events to organize activists, and researched the cost and consequences of cutting funding for public services. NPI formally incorporated as a nonprofit in March 2005.

The organization maintains a list of major milestones at its website.

== Projects ==
NPI maintains several major projects and publications which are accessible to the public. They are:

- The Cascadia Advocate. Begun in March 2004, The Cascadia Advocate is NPI's blog, providing daily news and analysis from the organization's team of writers, including frequent liveblogging of events such as town halls, political party conventions, or even bus tours. The blog frequently covers campaigns for public office (though the organization does not endorse candidates for office), legislative activity in state capitals, and reporting of regional political developments. Posts often incorporate photos and illustrations, and occasionally cartoons. The National Journal's Hotline relied on The Cascadia Advocate throughout 2006 for perspective on Washington's U.S. Senate race. The blog is also featured as part of local television station KING5's Citizen Rain project, which chronicles what local blogs are talking about.
- Pacific NW Portal. Launched January 31, 2005, Pacific NW Portal is a news aggregator and media gateway, similar in some respects to the Huffington Post. It generally covers three American states - Washington, Oregon, and Idaho. The site emphasizes political news (local and national) but also provides business and labor news, weather forecasts, and links to traffic reports. Hundreds of different blogs, newspapers, radio stations, and television networks are indexed. The site's Regional Blogs Directory provides a blogroll of progressive blogs based in Washington, Oregon, and Idaho. (The organization likens the directory to the online equivalent of a white pages for the progressive community online). Pacific NW Portal has undergone several transformations, most notably the release of new versions 3.0/"Cannon Beach" (in July 2005), 3.5/"Gearhart" (in October 2005) 4.0/"Seaside" (May 2006) and 5.0/"Newport" (December 2011). Releases of Pacific NW Portal are named after Oregon coastal towns. In August 2005, Seattle Weekly readers gave Pacific NW Portal the honor of Best Local Website in the paper's annual "Best of Seattle" poll. The paper's editors wrote:

When Seattleites are feeling, well, blue, they visit PACIFIC NW PORTAL for regional news for progressives. You can also find links to political blogs and newsgroups and drinking buddies for whenever Dubya next chooses to open his mouth.

- Podcast. The Northwest Progressive Institute also distributes a podcast which regularly includes monologue commentary from the organization's staff or interviews with candidates and elected officials. A notable episode from April 2006 was a discussion between NPI's founder and bloggers Markos Moulitsas of DailyKos and Jerome Armstrong of MyDD.
- In Brief. Begun in March 2009, In Brief is NPI's microblog. Published using Tumblr, it is a compendium of asides, quotations, recommended links, photographs, audio recordings, and video clips collected by NPI's staff and contributors. In Brief is embedded on the sidebar of the NPI Advocate and is also published to Pacific NW Portal's front page.
- Check the Attacks. Begun in July 2012, Check the Attacks (a play on the phrase "Check the facts") is a gallery of attack mailers sent by U.S. Mail to voters in the Pacific Northwest and collected by the organization. The intent of the site is to shine a spotlight on negative campaigning, allowing citizens, activists, and journalists to see what candidates or independent groups are telling voters.

== Events and influence ==
NPI's work is followed by opinion-makers and elected leaders throughout the region. Seattle Post-Intelligencer columnist Joel Connelly has called NPI "the state's best grassroots research outfit" while Washington's State Senate Majority Leader, Lisa Brown, has told the Spokesman-Review that NPI's network is one of her favorite online destinations:

When I've had too much of mainstream politics, I keep up with my activist roots by listening to Air America, or I go to Pacific NW Portal. I could spend hours there - if I had hours to spare!

Brown has also urged constituents to visit the NPI Advocate on the official website of the Senate Democratic caucus.

Each year, NPI holds a spring fundraising gala which brings together the organization's supporters. The speaking program usually consists of elected officials, candidates for office, and well known community leaders. The speaking program for the first event (held in 2008) included Major General Paul Eaton (Ret)., congressional candidate Darcy Burner, and hydroplane legend Chip Hanauer. Speakers at the second event, held in 2010, included VoteVets.org founder Jon Soltz, former Microsoft vice president and congressional candidate Suzan DelBene, State Representative Hans Dunshee and documentary filmmaker John de Graaf. Speakers at the third event, held in 2011, included well-known Seattle attorney Timothy Ford, King County Councilmember Bob Ferguson, former Seattle City Councilmember Peter Steinbrueck, the University of Washington's Scott Macklin, former U.S. Representative Jay Inslee and State Representative Reuven Carlyle. Speakers at the fourth event, held in 2012, included U.S. Senator Maria Cantwell, U.S. Representative Adam Smith, and former King County Executive Ron Sims.

In August 2012, NPI was accredited to cover the 2012 Democratic National Convention in Charlotte, North Carolina.

Since late 2002, the organization's perspective has frequently been sought by the regional press, including The Associated Press The Seattle Times, Seattle Post-Intelligencer, The Spokesman-Review, The Stranger, KIRO-TV and KIRO (AM), KOMO, The Olympian, Washington Law & Politics, and others.

NPI's founder Andrew Villeneuve has written a column for Reporter Newspapers since December 2008, as well as guest op-eds for newspapers like the Seattle Post-Intelligencer and Everett Herald.

== Work on ballot measures ==
Permanent Defense, which became a project of NPI following NPI's formation in August 2003, has continued to oppose initiatives and referendums sponsored by conservative groups and activists, especially Tim Eyman. Though Permanent Defense's first campaign (NO on I-776) ended in a loss, it has since put together a string of victories, working alongside businesses, unions, and civic groups in coalitions organized to defeat Eyman's proposals.

Permanent Defense has actively opposed the following ballot measures:

- Initiative 776 (2002): Repealed motor vehicle excise taxes levied by King, Pierce, Snohomish, and Douglas counties which paid for road maintenance and transit operations. The measure also sought to repeal a motor vehicle excise tax collected by Sound Transit, a municipal transit authority based in Seattle, which Sound Transit was counting on to help fund its Central Link light rail project. Eyman had advertised I-776 as a way for the public to pull the plug on the light rail line (by cutting off some of Sound Transit's funding). Although I-776 was narrowly passed by voters, Washington courts ruled that because the taxes had been pledged to pay off bonds, they could not be repealed. The tax continued to be collected, construction on the line began in 2003, and opened to the public in July 2009. NPI chronicled the progress of the project during its construction phase; it also liveblogged the opening weekend.
- Initiative 267 (2002): Would have required vehicle sales and use taxes to be used exclusively for road construction and maintenance, and opened high occupancy vehicle lanes to solo drivers during more hours of the day. I-267 did not qualify for the ballot.
- Initiative 807 (2003): Would have required two-thirds votes for tax increases. I-807 did not qualify for the ballot.
- Initiative 864 (2004): Would have drastically cut property taxes. I-864 did not qualify for the ballot. During the campaign against I-864, Permanent Defense participated in a grassroots coalition that included firefighters, librarians, and other public servants. These efforts paid off in July 2004 when Tim Eyman failed to collect the required number of signatures.
- Initiative 892 (2004): Would have legalized electronic slot machines (or video lottery terminals) in neighborhood restaurants, bars, bowling alleys, and casinos; revenue from taxes on the machines would have been used to offset property taxes. The gambling industry supplied the money to pay for signature gathering, and the measure qualified for the ballot in July 2004. Permanent Defense worked with many other civic groups to launch the NO on I-892 campaign. Initiative 892 was rejected by voters 61.55% to 38.45% on November 2, 2004.
- Initiative 912 and Initiative 900 (2005): In 2005, NPI's Permanent Defense concentrated energy and resources on opposing Initiative 912, an attempt to roll back a nine cent gas tax increase passed by the Legislature. I-912 was not sponsored by Tim Eyman, though it enjoyed his support. After a long campaign that began in the late spring and ended in November with the election, NPI and its allies won. The final days of the campaign featured an event on the Seattle waterfront covered by local radio, newspapers, and TV which the organized dubbed the "Viaduct Hazard Demonstration", intended to show that passage of the initiative would cripple the state's ability to replace decaying structures such as the Alaskan Way Viaduct. NPI's Permanent Defense also opposed Tim Eyman's Initiative 900, which gave the state auditor the power to conduct performance audits of state and local agencies. I-900 was approved by voters 56.4% to 43.6% in spite of the concerns raised by NPI and echoed by The Stranger and the Municipal League of King County.
- Initiative 917 and Referendum 65 (2006): In 2006, Permanent Defense opposed Tim Eyman's Referendum 65 (an attempt to force a public vote on a law that outlawed discrimination on the basis of sexual orientation) and Initiative 917 (another attempt to set vehicle fees at $30 per year by repealing vehicle and weight fees used to fund transportation infrastructure). Neither measure qualified for the ballot, although I-917 came close. In the autumn of 2006, NPI worked within two coalitions to successfully stop Initiative 933 (loosening land use regulations) and Initiative 920 (repealing the state estate tax) while ensuring passage of Initiative 937 (clean energy).
- Initiative 960 (2007): Required two-thirds votes to raise revenue. NPI and its allies argued the measure was "unconstitutional, unfair, and unsound", predicting it would lead to increased legislative gridlock and underfunded public services. Voters narrowly approved I-960 in November 2007. I-960 was subjected to a court challenge filed by then-Senate Majority Leader Lisa Brown of Spokane, but the state Supreme Court threw the suit out on a technicality. I-960 was later suspended by the state Legislature during the 2010 legislative session so that legislators could democratically vote on a proposal to balance the state budget through a mix of cuts and increases in revenue.
- Initiative 985 (2008): Would have opened up high occupancy vehicle lanes to solo drivers during most hours of the day and appropriated money from the state general fund to widen highways. I-985 also sought to place restrictions on the use of tolls and red light cameras. NPI dubbed I-985 the "More Traffic Measure" and urged its rejection; it was overwhelmingly defeated by voters in November 2008 - coincidentally at the same time voters in central Puget Sound approved an increase in sales taxes to expand light rail to Redmond, Lynnwood, and Federal Way.
- Initiative 1033 (2009): Would have imposed expenditure limits on state, city, and county governments, as had been done in Colorado many years earlier. At the time I-1033 was before voters, NPI described it as Eyman's most dangerous proposal yet. Washingtonians rejected I-1033 55.38% to 44.32% in November 2009.
- Initiative 1053 (2010): Restated I-960's requirement that bills to increase revenue must receive a two-thirds vote. For much of 2010, NPI was largely alone in speaking out against I-1053 because many of its past allies were focused on other priorities, like passing I-1098 (a measure to impose an income tax on high earners). Thanks to a lack of organized opposition early on, I-1053 passed by a very lopsided margin. However, the following year, it was challenged in court by a group of parents, teachers, and lawmakers. King County Superior Court Judge Bruce Heller struck down I-1053 in its entirety in May 2012, agreeing with NPI that the measure was unconstitutional.
- Initiative 1125 (2011): Would have restricted how the state government imposed and collected tolls. The measure, bankrolled by longtime Eyman donor Kemper Freeman Jr., also sought to interfere with Sound Transit's East Link project by prohibiting the state from transferring part of the Homer M. Hadley Memorial Bridge to Sound Transit. (The bridge is one of two spans that carries Interstate 90 across Lake Washington; Sound Transit intends to convert the current express lanes to a fixed guideway so that light rail can cross the lake and reach the Eastside cities of Mercer Island, Bellevue, and Redmond). I-1125 was defeated by voters in November 2011. Microsoft (which, like NPI, is based in Redmond) provided much of the opposition campaign's war chest.

In 2004, Permanent Defense, Taxpayers for Washington's Future, and TaxSanity.org filed a complaint against Eyman with the state Public Disclosure Commission (PDC), accusing Eyman of violating the public disclosure law and secretly moving funds from one political committee to another without properly reporting the transfers. The PDC took enforcement action in January 2005 as a result of the complaint, ordering Eyman's committees to pay a fine of several hundred dollars.

Permanent Defense celebrated its tenth anniversary on February 13, 2012.
