= 2021 Seattle mayoral election =

- November 2, 2021
- Turnout: 54.57%
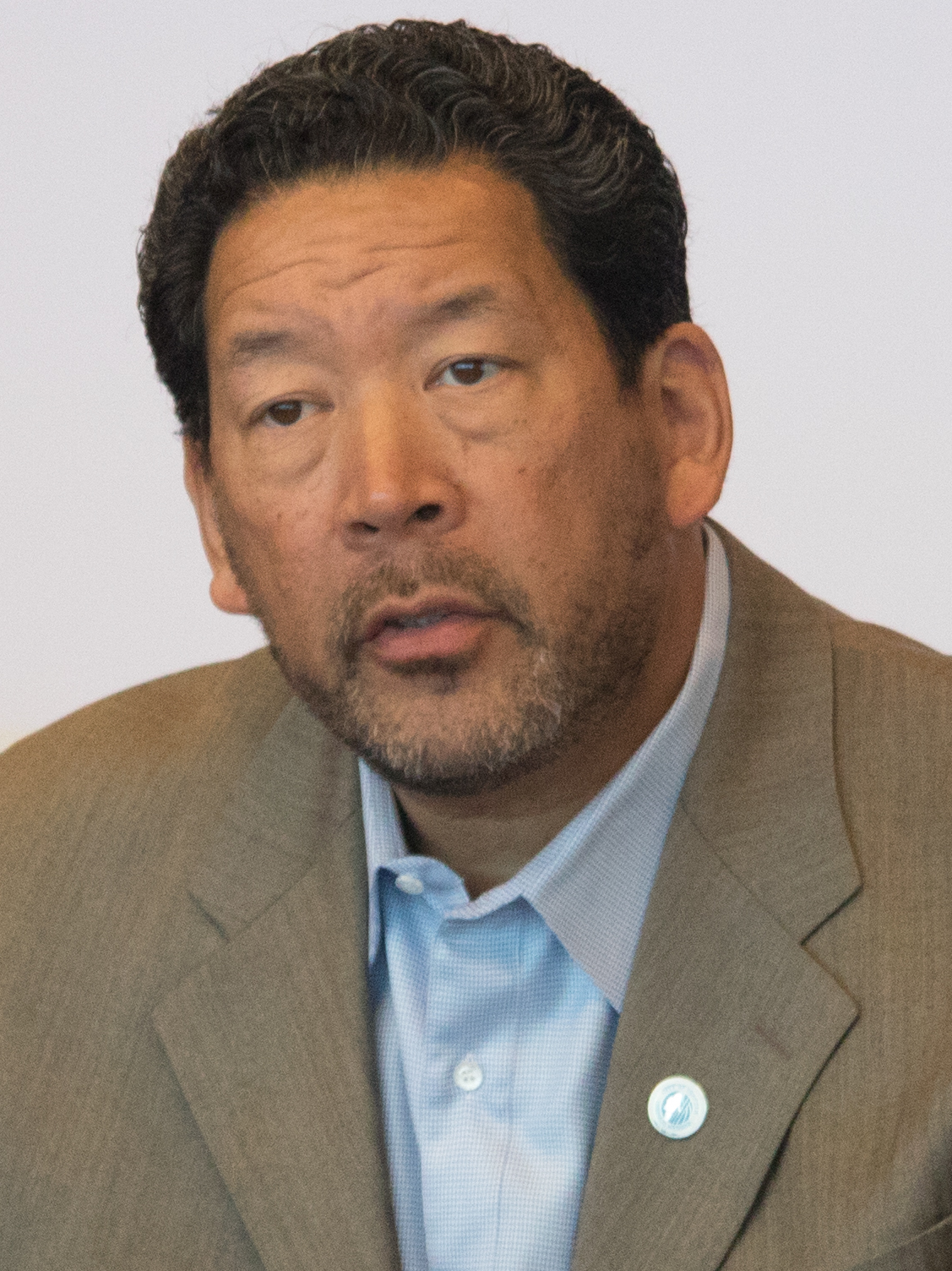

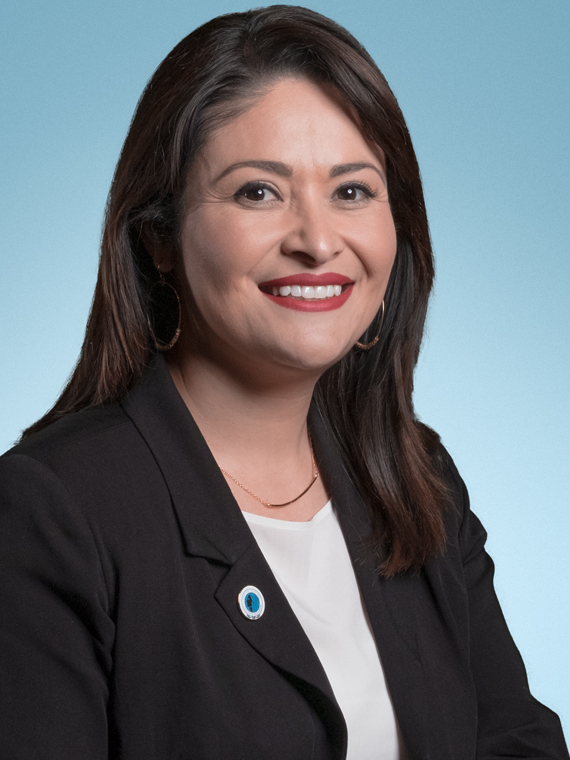
Candidate	Bruce Harrell	Lorena González
Popular vote	155,294	109,132
Percentage	58.56%	41.15%
- Harrell: 40–50% 50–60% 60–70% 70–80% 80–90% >90% González: 40–50% 50–60% 60–70% 70–80% 80–90% Tie: 40–50% 50%
Mayor before election
Jenny Durkan
Democratic
Elected mayor
Bruce Harrell
Democratic

The 2021 Seattle mayoral election was held on November 2, 2021, to elect the Mayor of Seattle. It was won by former Seattle City Council President Bruce Harrell, who defeated Lorena González. The nonpartisan primary election was August 3.

Incumbent mayor Jenny Durkan initially sought reelection but withdrew that December due to backlash from her handling of the economic fallout from the COVID-19 pandemic in Seattle as well as the Capitol Hill Occupied Protest during the George Floyd protests.

González conceded to Harrell on November 4. The 17-point margin of victory was the largest of a non-incumbent candidate in a Seattle mayoral race since the 1969 election of Wesley C. Uhlman. Harrell assumed office on January 1, 2022, having previously held the position as acting mayor for five days in September 2017 upon the resignation of Ed Murray. Due to COVID-19, he was sworn in privately the prior week and held a small inauguration ceremony on January 4.

The 2021 election was the first in which mayoral candidates were eligible to use Seattle's democracy vouchers program, which has captured the interest of other cities.

== Primary election ==
=== Candidates ===
==== Declared ====
- Clinton Bliss, medical doctor and small business owner
- Henry Dennison, rail worker and candidate for governor in 2020
- James Donaldson, activist, former Seattle SuperSonics player, and candidate for mayor in 2009
- Colleen Echohawk, executive director of the Chief Seattle Club
- Jessyn Farrell, state representative for the 46th district (2013–2017), candidate for mayor in 2017
- Lorena González, president of the Seattle City Council (2020–present), at-large city council-member (2015–present)
- Bruce Harrell, former acting mayor (2017), former president of the Seattle City Council (2016–2020), former city council-member (2008–2016; 2016–2020), candidate for mayor in 2013
- Andrew Grant Houston, renter, small business owner, and activist
- Arthur K. Langlie, businessman and grandson of former mayor of Seattle and governor of Washington Arthur B. Langlie
- Stan Lippman, disbarred attorney and perennial candidate
- Lance Randall, executive director of Southeast Effective Development Seattle
- Don L. Rivers, King County Metro worker
- Casey Sixkiller, deputy mayor of Seattle
- Omari Tahir-Garrett, activist and candidate for Seattle City Council District 2 in 2019
- Bobby Tucker, author

==== Withdrew ====
- Jenny Durkan, incumbent mayor

==== Declined ====
- Gordon McHenry Jr., president and CEO of the United Way of King County
- Cary Moon, activist, urban planner, and runner-up for mayor in 2017
- Teresa Mosqueda, city councillor (endorsed Lorena Gonzalez)
- Joe Nguyen, state senator (running for King County Executive)
- Nikkita Oliver, attorney, community activist and candidate for mayor in 2017 (running for Seattle City Council)
- Rebecca Saldaña, state senator (endorsed Lorena Gonzalez)
- Girmay Zahilay, member of the King County Council

=== Endorsements ===
Colleen Echohawk

Mayors

- Mike McGinn, former mayor of Seattle

Seattle city councilmembers

- Sally Bagshaw, former Seattle city councilmember
- Sally Clark, former Seattle city councilmember
- Dan Strauss (co-endorsement with Jessyn Farrell)
Andrew Grant Houston

Organizations

- Washington Stonewall Democrats
- Young Democrats at the University of Washington
Jessyn Farrell

Statewide officeholders

- Hilary Franz, commissioner of Public Lands

State legislators

- David Hackney, state representative (District 11)
- Strom Peterson, state representative (District 21)
- Gerry Pollet, state representative (District 46)
- June Robinson, state senator (District 38)
- Cindy Ryu, state representative (District 32)
- Brady Pinero Walkinshaw, CEO of Grist, former state representative, and general election-advanced candidate for Washington's 7th congressional district in 2016

Seattle city councilmembers

- Dan Strauss (co-endorsement with Colleen Echohawk)
Lorena Gonzalez

Federal officeholders

- Julian Castro, former U.S. Secretary of Housing and Urban Development, former mayor of San Antonio, Texas, and candidate for president of the United States in 2020
- Pramila Jayapal, U.S. representative from Washington's 7th congressional district
- Bernie Sanders, U.S. senator from Vermont, former candidate for President of the United States in 2020
- Elizabeth Warren, U.S. senator from Massachusetts, former candidate for president of the United States in 2020

State senators

- Rebecca Saldaña, State senator (District 37)

State representatives

- Liz Berry, state representative (District 36)
- Kirsten Harris-Talley, state representative (District 37)
- Nicole Macri, state representative (District 43)

Seattle city councilmembers

- Lisa Herbold, Seattle City Council member (District 1)
- Andrew Lewis, Seattle City Council member (District 7)
- Tammy Morales, Seattle City Council member (District 2)
- Teresa Mosqueda, Seattle City Council member (District 8)
- Mike O'Brien, former Seattle City Council member (District 6)
- Jim Street, former Seattle City Council member (District 6)

Individuals

- Jorge Barón, executive director of the Northwest Immigrant Rights Project

Organizations

- Latino Victory Fund
- UFCW21
- Working Families Party

Media

- The Stranger
Bruce Harrell

Federal officeholders

- Gary Locke, former United States Secretary of Commerce, former governor of Washington
- Marilyn Strickland, U.S. representative from Washington's 10th congressional district
- Adam Smith, U.S. representative from Washington's 9th congressional district

State legislators

- Steve Bergquist, state representative (District 11)
- Reuven Carlyle, state senator (District 36)
- Jamie Pedersen, state senator (District 43)
- Jesse Salomon, state senator (District 32)
- Sharon Tomiko Santos, state representative (District 37)

Seattle city councilmembers

- David Della, former Seattle City Council member (District 7)
- Jan Drago, former Seattle City Council and King County Councilmember (District 4)
- Abel Pacheco, former Seattle City Council member (District 4)
- Tom Rasmussen, former Seattle City Council member (District 6)

Mayors

- Norm Rice, former mayor of Seattle
- Wes Uhlman, former mayor of Seattle

Organizations

- Washington Technology Industry Association

Media

- The Seattle Times
Casey Sixkiller

Federal officeholders

- Derek Kilmer, U.S. representative from Washington's 6th congressional district

Groups

- Neighborhoods for Smart Streets
Declined to endorse
- Seattle Chamber of Commerce

=== Polling ===
Graphical summary

Poll source	Date(s) administered	Sample size (Note: Key: A – all adults RV – registered voters LV – likely voters V – unclear)	Margin of error	Colleen Echohawk	Jessyn Farrell	Lorena González	Bruce Harrell	Andrew Grant Houston	Casey Sixkiller	Other	Undecided
Change Research (D) (Note: This poll was sponsored by the Northwest Progressive Institute.)	July 12–15, 2021	617 (LV)	± 4.3%	10%	6%	12%	20%	6%	4%	9% (Note: Art Langlie with 4%; Lance Randall with 3%; James Donaldson and Bobby Tucker with 1%; Omari Tahir-Garrett, Clinton Bliss, Henry C. Dennison, Stan Lippmann, and Don L. Rivers with 0%)	32%
Washington Research Group (D) (Note: This poll was conducted by Seattle-based Democratic political consultants John Wyble and Bill Broadhead, who support Colleen Echohawk for mayor)	July 13–14, 2021	524 (LV)	± 4.3%	5%	4%	8%	17%	4%	3%	5% (Note: Art Langlie with 3%; Lance Randall with 2%)	55%
ALG Research (D) (Note: This poll was sponsored by Farrell's campaign.)	May 10–16, 2021	500 (LV)	± 4.4%	7%	7%	11%	23%	3%	5%	3%	41%
GQR Research (D) (Note: This poll was sponsored by González's campaign.)	March 23–28, 2021	400 (LV)	± 4.9%	9%	6%	19%	20%	–	–	8%	38%

=== Forum ===
2021 Seattle mayoral candidate forum
No.	Date	Host	Moderator	Link	Nonpartisan	Nonpartisan	Nonpartisan	Nonpartisan	Nonpartisan	Nonpartisan
Key: P Participant A Absent N Not invited I Invited W Withdrawn										
Key: P Participant A Absent N Not invited I Invited W Withdrawn					Colleen Echohawk	Lorena González	Bruce Harrell	Arthur Langlie	Lance Randall	Casey Sixkiller
1	Jun. 29, 2021	Downtown Seattle; Association	Chris Daniels; Essex Porter	YouTube	P	P	P	P	P	P

=== Results ===
By August 6, Echohawk, Farrell, and Houston had all conceded, and Harrell and González were viewed as the winners of the primary.

Harrell: 30–40%
González: 30–40%

Harrell: 30–40%
González: 30–40%

Harrell: 30–40%
González: 30–40%

Harrell: 20–30% 30–40% 40–50% 50–60% 60–70% >90%
González: 20–30% 30–40% 40–50% 50–60% 60–70%
Echohawk: 40–50%
Tie: 20–30% 30–40% 40–50% 50% No votes

Nonpartisan primary results
Candidate	Votes	%
Bruce Harrell	69,612	34.00
Lorena González	65,750	32.11
Colleen Echohawk	21,042	10.28
Jessyn Farrell	14,931	7.29
Arthur Langlie	11,372	5.55
Casey Sixkiller	6,918	3.38
Andrew Grant Houston	5,485	2.68
James Donaldson	3,219	1.57
Lance Randall	2,804	1.37
Clinton Bliss	1,618	0.79
Omari Tahir-Garrett	391	0.19
Bobby Tucker	377	0.18
Henry Dennison	347	0.17
Stan Lippmann	323	0.16
Don Rivers	189	0.09
Write-in	386	0.19
Total votes	206,814	100.00

== General election ==
=== Candidates ===
- Lorena González, city council president
- Bruce Harrell, former city council president

=== Endorsements ===
Endorsements in bold were made after the primary election.

Lorena Gonzalez

Federal officeholders

- Julian Castro, former U.S. Secretary of Housing and Urban Development, former mayor of San Antonio, Texas, and candidate for president of the United States in 2020
- Pramila Jayapal, U.S. representative from Washington's 7th congressional district
- Bernie Sanders, U.S. senator from Vermont, candidate for president of the United States in 2016 and 2020
- **Elizabeth Warren**, U.S. senator from Massachusetts, candidate for president of the United States in 2020

State senators

- Rebecca Saldaña, State senator (District 37)

State Representatives

- Liz Berry, state representative (District 36)
- Kirsten Harris-Talley, state representative (District 37)
- Nicole Macri, state representative (District 43)

Mayors

- **Mike McGinn**, former mayor of Seattle

Seattle city councilmembers

- Lisa Herbold, Seattle City Council member (District 1)
- Andrew Lewis, Seattle City Council member (District 7)
- Tammy Morales, Seattle City Council member (District 2)
- Teresa Mosqueda, Seattle City Council member (District 8)
- Mike O'Brien, former Seattle City Council member (District 6)
- **Dan Strauss**, Seattle City Council member (District 6)
- Jim Street, former Seattle City Council member (District 6)

Individuals

- Jorge Barón, executive director of the Northwest Immigrant Rights Project

Organizations

- Latino Victory Fund
- UFCW 21

Media

- The Stranger
Bruce Harrell

Federal officeholders

- Gary Locke, former United States Secretary of Commerce, former governor of Washington
- Marilyn Strickland, U.S. representative from Washington's 10th congressional district
- Adam Smith, U.S. representative from Washington's 6th congressional district

State legislators

- Steve Bergquist, state representative (District 11)
- Reuven Carlyle, state senator (District 36)
- **Jessyn Farrell**, former state representative and candidate for mayor of Seattle in 2017 and 2021
- Jamie Pedersen, state senator (District 43)
- Jesse Salomon, state senator (District 32)
- Sharon Tomiko Santos, state representative (District 37)
- Cindy Ryu, state representative (District 32)

Seattle city councilmembers

- David Della, former Seattle City Council member (District 7)
- Jan Drago, former Seattle City Council and King County Councilmember (District 4)
- Abel Pacheco, former Seattle City Council member (District 4)
- Tom Rasmussen, former Seattle City Council member (District 6)

Mayors

- Norm Rice, former mayor of Seattle
- Charles Royer, former mayor of Seattle
- Wes Uhlman, former mayor of Seattle

Organizations

- IAFF Local 27 (Firefighters Union)
- **Washington State Council of County and City Employees**
- Washington Technology Industry Association

Media

- The Seattle Times

=== Polling ===
Graphical summary

Poll source	Date(s) administered	Sample size	Margin of error	Lorena González	Bruce Harrell	Other	Undecided
Change Research (D)	October 12–15, 2021	617 (LV)	± 4.1%	32%	**48%**	2% (Note: "Would not vote" with 2%)	18%
Strategies 360 (D)	September 13–16, 2021	450 (RV)	± 4.6%	33%	**40%**	–	27%
Strategies 360 (D)	September 13–16, 2021	287 (LV)	± 5.8%	37%	**48%**	–	15%
GQR Research (D)	September 11–14, 2021	400 (LV)	± 4.9%	**45%**	**45%**	–	10%
Elway Research	September 7–9, 2021	400 (LV)	± 5.0%	27%	**42%**	7%	24%

=== Debates ===
2021 Seattle mayoral debates
No.	Date	Host	Moderator	Link	Nonpartisan	Nonpartisan
Key: P Participant A Absent N Not invited I Invited W Withdrawn						
Key: P Participant A Absent N Not invited I Invited W Withdrawn					Lorena González	Bruce Harrell
1	Oct. 14, 2021	KCTS9; TVW; Washington State; Debate Coalition	Mary Nam		**P**	**P**
2	Oct. 28, 2021	KCTS9; TVW; Washington State; Debate Coalition	Essex Porter	YouTube	**P**	**P**

=== Results ===
General election results
Candidate	Votes	%
Bruce Harrell	**155,294**	**58.56**
Lorena González	109,132	41.15
Write-in	777	0.29
Total votes	**265,203**	**100.00**

== See also ==
- 2021 Seattle City Attorney election
- 2021 Seattle City Council election

== Notes ==
Partisan clients
