= Bruce Harrell =

American politician (born 1958)

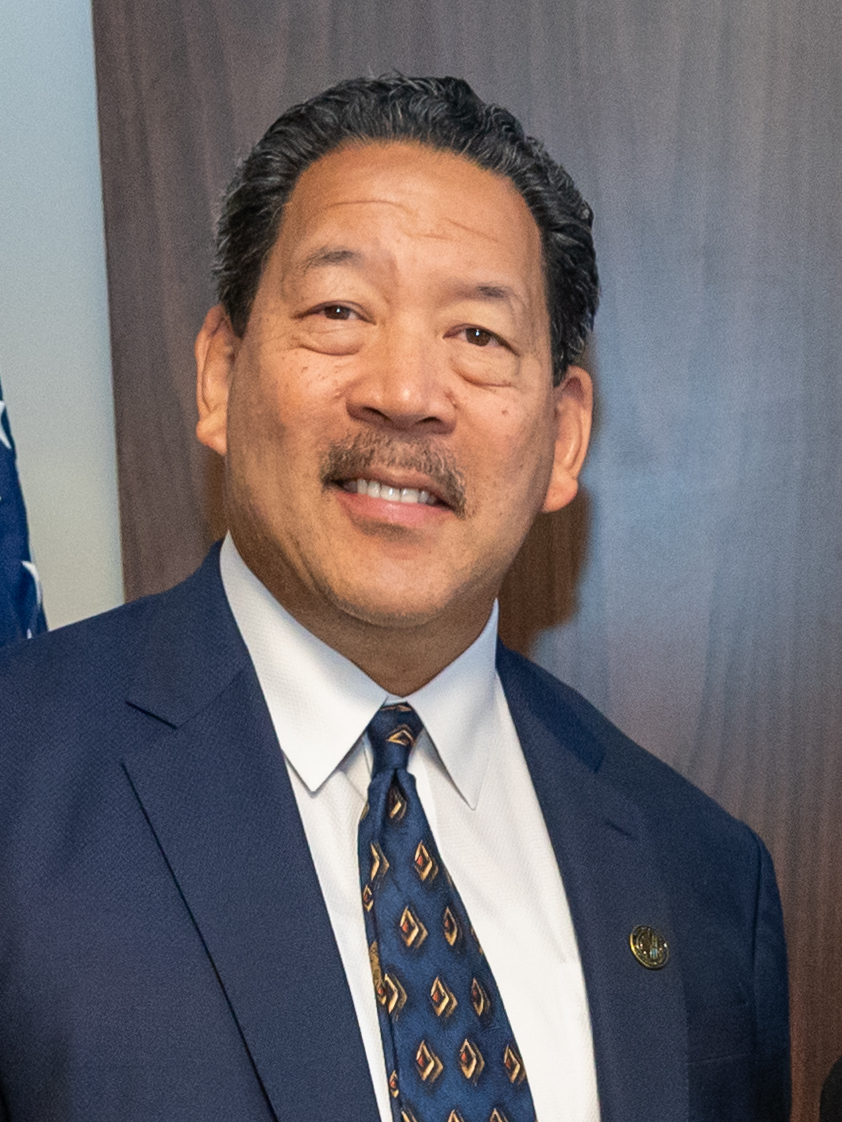
- Harrell in 2022

54th and 57th Mayor of Seattle
- In office January 1, 2022 – January 1, 2026
- Preceded by: Jenny Durkan
- Succeeded by: Katie Wilson
- Acting; September 13, 2017 – September 18, 2017
- Preceded by: Ed Murray
- Succeeded by: Tim Burgess

President of the Seattle City Council
- In office January 5, 2016 – January 5, 2020
- Preceded by: Tim Burgess
- Succeeded by: Lorena González

Member of the Seattle City Council
- In office January 3, 2008 – January 6, 2020
- Preceded by: Peter Steinbrueck
- Succeeded by: Tammy Morales
- Constituency: District 2 (2016–2020); Position 3 (2008–2016)

Personal details
- Born: Bruce Allen Harrell; October 10, 1958 (age 68) Seattle, Washington, U.S.
- Party: Democratic
- Spouse: Joanne Harrell (m. 1992)
- Education: University of Washington (BA, JD); City University of Seattle (MS)

Bruce Allen Harrell (born October 10, 1958) is an American politician and attorney who was the 54th and 57th mayor of Seattle. He was a member of the Seattle City Council from 2008 to 2020. From 2016 to 2020, he was president of the city council. He was acting mayor of Seattle from September 13 to 18, 2017 following the resignation of Ed Murray. He was elected mayor in his own right in 2021, becoming the city's second African-American mayor and its first Asian-American mayor. In the 2025 Seattle mayoral election, he was defeated by progressive challenger Katie Wilson in his bid for reelection to a second term.

== Early life ==
Harrell was born in 1958 in Seattle, to an African American father who worked for Seattle City Light and a Japanese-American mother who worked for the Seattle Public Library. As a child during World War II, Harrell's mother was incarcerated with her family at Minidoka internment camp in Idaho. Growing up, Harrell and his family lived in the Central District in Seattle in a minority neighborhood. He attended Garfield High School and played football there as a linebacker, being named to the all-Metro team. He captained the football team during his senior season, during which the team played in the 1975 Metro League championship. He was also named the most valuable player of his high school baseball and wrestling teams, and received nine varsity letters. He graduated from Garfield in 1976 as class valedictorian. Keith Harrell, fellow Garfield alumnus and Seattle college sports star, was his cousin.

== College football career and post-secondary education ==
After high school, Harrell attended the University of Washington on a football scholarship, rejecting an offer to attend Harvard University. He played for the Washington Huskies football team from 1976 to 1979 and was named to the 1979 All-Pacific-10 Conference football team. He received the National Football Foundation Scholar-Athlete Award, made the national Academic All-American First Team in football, and was named the Husky defensive player of the year. In 2013, he was inducted into the NW Football Hall of Fame. Harrell was a starting linebacker, and was named both a First-team Academic All-American. During his senior season in 1979, he led the team in tackles and the Huskies won the Sun Bowl.

Harrell graduated in 1980 with a Bachelor of Arts in political science. He continued his education at the university and earned a Juris Doctor from the UW Law School in 1984. In 1994, he earned a master's degree in organizational design and improvement from City University of Seattle. Harrell received the University of Washington Distinguished Alumni Award in 2007 and its Timeless Award in 2012.

== Early career ==
After attending law school, Harrell joined US West, now Lumen Technologies, in 1987. Harrell was chief legal advisor to the Rainier Valley Community Development Fund, chief legal advisor to the First A.M.E. Church and First A.M.E. Housing Corporation, chief counsel to US West, and the Alpha Phi Alpha fraternity, Zeta Pi Lambda chapter.

Harrell was nominated to the public housing board in Omaha in 1996. Harrell claimed to have received threats after his nomination by individuals preferring the appointment of someone who lived in public housing to the board seat. On the evening of September 27, 1996, Harrell allegedly pointed a gun at a man, his mother, and his pregnant wife, in a Council Bluffs casino in response to a parking dispute, which resulted in his arrest. At the time, Harrell told reporters he had only "displayed" his gun and had been carrying the weapon for protection due to death threats he had received following his housing board nomination. He did not have permit for gun in Iowa at the time of his arrest. Charges against Harrell were dismissed six months later in what County Prosecutor Rick Crowl described as an “unofficial deferred prosecution.” Crowl cited Harrell's claim of having felt threatened by "a Hispanic group" during the exchange as among his reasons for dropping the charges. According to Crowl, Harrell was required to apologize to the arresting officers. A letter written by Crowl in 2024 described Harrell's display of the weapon as “non-threatening” and the incident as “minor.”

== Seattle City Council (2008–2020) ==
From 2008 to 2020, Harrell served as a member of the Seattle City Council, first in the city-wide Position 3 seat (2008–2016) and then in the south-end District 2 seat (2016–2020).

=== Elections ===
==== 2007 election ====
In 2007, councilmember Peter Steinbrueck chose not to run for re-election, which drew five challengers for the open seat, which included Harrell, former city councilmember John Manning, and former mayoral candidate Al Runte. Prior to the primary election, Harrell and Venus Velázquez, a private public-affairs consultant, were the only candidates in the race to raise more than $100,000 and were considered front-runners. In the August primary, Velázquez came in first, earning 43.72% of the vote, and advanced to the general election with Harrell, who earned 28.43%.

Harrell focused his campaign on public safety, pushing for increased funding for the police and fire departments, with education being another top priority. Velázquez, who Steinbrueck endorsed, emphasised city growth without displacing low and middle-income individuals, and increasing affordability. Velázquez was seen as a frontrunner in the election until weeks before the election, when she was arrested on suspicion of DUI. Although she was later found not guilty in a jury trial, she stated her prosecution was politically motivated since the city attorney, Tom Carr, endorsed Harrell.

In the November general election, Harrell defeated Velázquez, 59.88% to 39.66%.

==== 2011 election ====
Harrell ran for reelection in 2011 and faced one challenger, Brad Meacham, a former financial journalist and chair of the Municipal League of King County.

Harrell ran on his work on the council overseeing Seattle City Light, pushing the utility to sell surplus property, build a $100 million savings account, and raise rates. Meacham criticized Harrell's oversight of the utility and accused Harrell of raising rates without a strategic plan in place. Harrell stated that the rate increase “was absolutely necessary” and that his work has brought stability to City Light. The candidates differed on public safety, with Harrell endorsing the use of police body cams, which he said would improve trust, while Meacham called them "cynical," saying they avoided firing bad officers. Meacham was supported by the People's Waterfront Coalition and the Sierra Club, due to his opposition to the Alaskan Way Viaduct replacement tunnel, while Harrell was supported by business and labor groups.

In the November general election, Harrell defeated Meacham, 61% to 38%.

==== 2015 election ====
Following years of at-large city council elections, Seattle switched to district-based city council elections, and Harrell ran in the newly created District 2 seat, which covers the International District and South Seattle. Harrell faced two challengers, food advocate and community organizer Tammy Morales and Occupy Wall Street and Housing advocate Josh Farris. In the August primary, Harrell came in first, with 61.72% of the vote, and advanced to the general election with Morales, who earned 24.66%.

Harrell focused his campaign on public safety and his experience in office, while Morales ran as a progressive, emphasizing the need to address inequality in land use and city growth management. In the November general election, Harrell narrowly defeated Morales, 50.79% to 48.96%, a margin of 344 votes.

=== Tenure ===
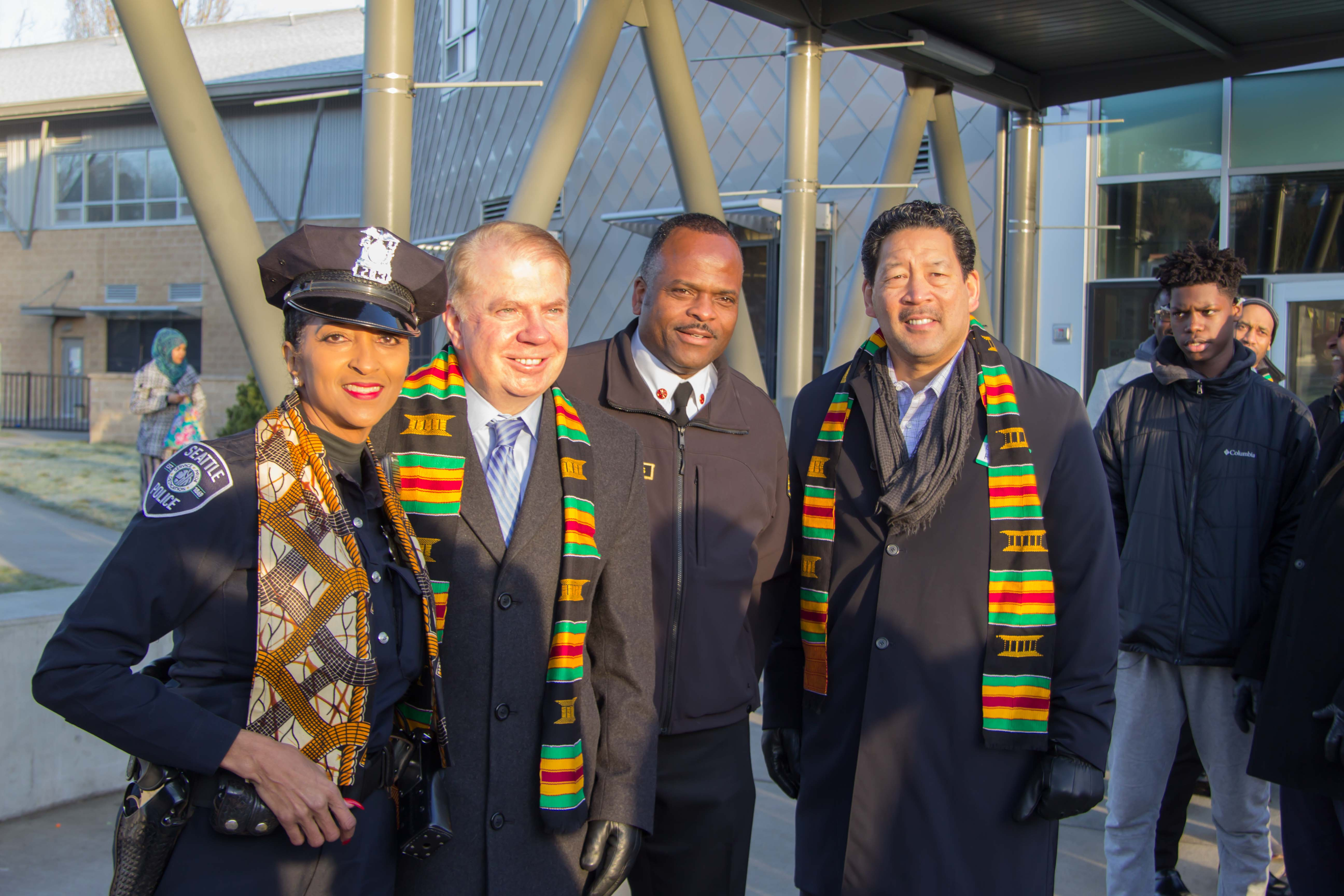
Councilman Harrell with mayor Ed Murray meeting with local African American leaders in 2017

While on the council, Harrell served as chair of the Governance, Equity and Technology Committee; vice chair of the Human Service, Equitable Development, and Renter Rights Committee; and a member of the Finance and Neighborhoods Committee.

Harrell participated in launching the Beacon Hill Broadband Pilot project, which expanded the city's fiber-optic cable network into underserved South End neighborhoods.

In 2013, the city adopted and enacted the Job Assistance Ordinance, a so-called "ban the box" ordinance introduced and sponsored by Harrell, which restricts private employers from asking job applicants to answer on their applications whether they have a criminal record. Its passage had been led by Harrell and leaders from the Sojourner Place Transitional Housing organization. It took three years of local debate and compromise for the ordinance to be adopted which involved Harrell's engagement with local businesses, legal advocates, and members of the city's Human Rights Commission. The council unanimously adopted the final version of the ordinance in June 2013.

In 2011, Harrell wrote a letter to then-US Attorney Jenny Durkan asking that the federal government mandate body cameras in Seattle. In December 2014, he announced a pilot program to equip 12 officers with body cameras in the East Precinct, with a department wide program by 2016. In 2017, Mayor Ed Murray has signed an executive order to require officers and sergeants to wear body cameras while on duty, which Harrell supported.

In 2014, Harrell was the only dissenting vote when the City Council's land use committee voted to rezone the area around the Mount Baker Light Rail Station to permit dense housing construction. Harrell unsuccessfully introduced amendments that would have delayed the upzoning indefinitely for further study and reduced the amount of housing that could be constructed near the public transit station. When the upzoning was put up to a vote in the City Council, Harrell was the only member to vote against it.

On January 4, 2016, he was sworn in to the District 2 office and elected council president by fellow councilmembers. Later that year, Harrell supported a measure to attempt to bring back the Seattle SuperSonics, but the measure was defeated in a 5–4 vote.

In 2018, Harrell supported a scaled-back version of the proposed Head Tax, a per-employee tax on large businesses to raise money for housing and homeless services, to $250 per employee. After the legislation passed, he voted to repeal the Head Tax, citing a risk of a referendum supported by Amazon and other businesses.

In 2019, Harrell chose not to run for reelection, stating, "Today I am announcing my intent not to seek re-election to the Seattle City Council for a fourth term because of my belief that three terms is sufficient in this role at this time." He stated his significant accomplishments included: police body cameras, legislation barring employers from automatically excluding job candidates with criminal records, and pushing internet companies to provide low-income students with high-speed access.

==== Acting mayor of Seattle ====
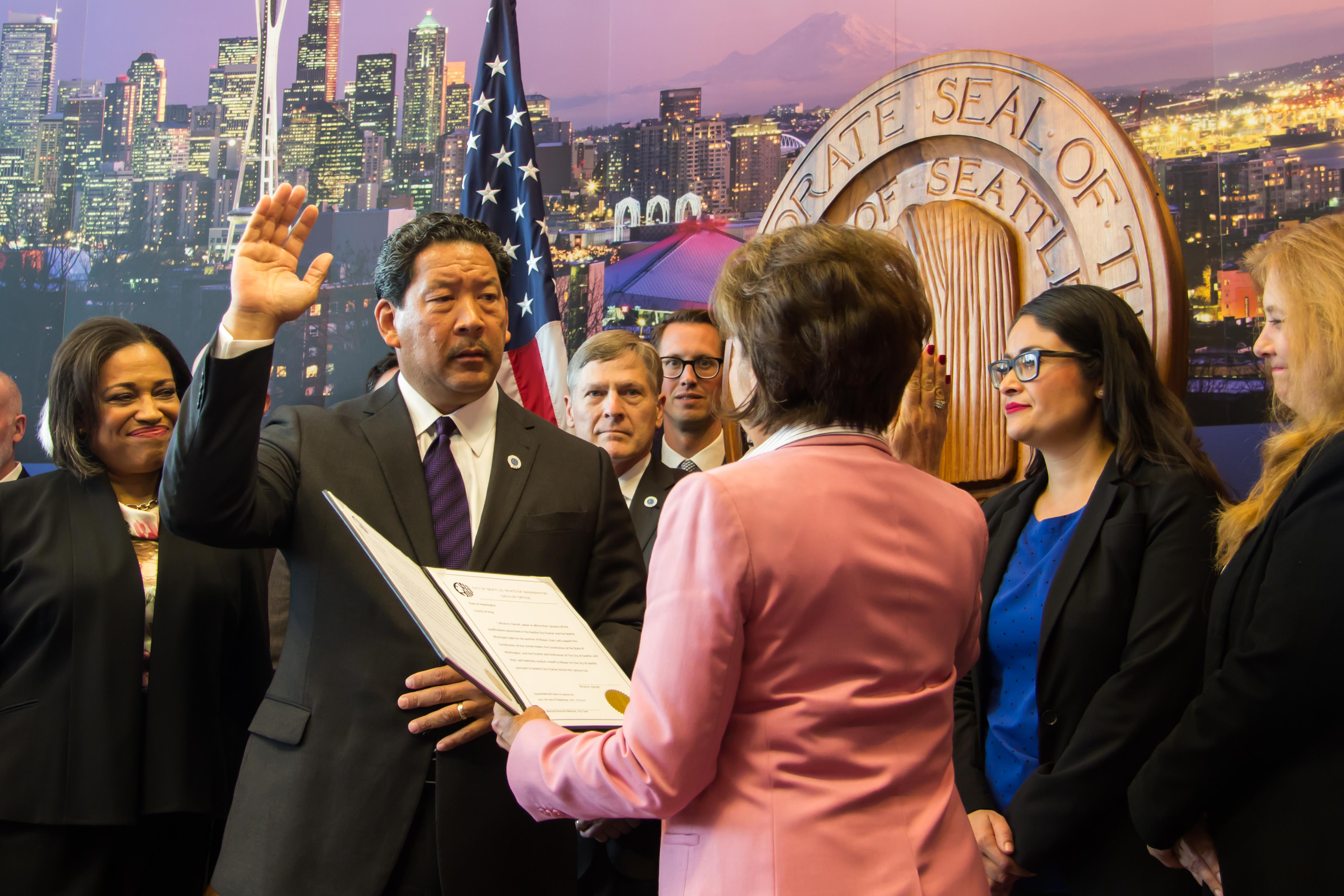
Harrell being sworn in as acting mayor

On September 12, 2017, Mayor Ed Murray resigned due to multiple allegations of child abuse, rape, and sexual molestation. Harrell initially stood by Murray after four accusers came forward, but after a fifth accuser came forward, Harrell called on Murray to resign, calling the allegations "unspeakable."

As council president, Harrell was sworn in as acting mayor of Seattle on September 13, 2017. Harrell served as acting mayor for a five-day period, after which the city council elected Tim Burgess to fill the position until the November election. Harrell declined to continue as acting mayor until November, which would have required him to lose his city council seat. During his short tenure as mayor, Harrell directed the city government to respond to Amazon's request for proposals from cities where it could potentially locate a second headquarters. He also ordered the city to increase public-space trash removal.

== Mayor of Seattle ==
=== Elections ===
==== 2013 election ====
In January 2013, Harrell announced his candidacy for Seattle mayor against incumbent Michael McGinn. Harrell called McGinn's leadership style as ineffective, and criticized the mayor over his handling of the federal probe into the Seattle Police Department over use of force and biased policing. During a primary debate, Harrell stated that McGinn's successes as mayor were legislation passed by the council, like the passage of paid sick leave.

In the August primary, Harrell came in fourth with 15.22% of the vote. He endorsed then-state senator Ed Murray in the general election.

==== 2021 election ====
After Mayor Jenny Durkan announced in 2021 that she would not seek reelection, Harrell announced his candidacy. In his announcement, he said "Look at what Seattle has become," referring to the ongoing homelessness crisis, business closures, property destruction, and racial violence. Harrell joined a crowded primary field of 15 candidates, which included Council President Lorena González, Chief Seattle Club Executive Director Colleen Echohawk, former state representative Jessyn Farrell, and architect Andrew Grant Houston. In the August primary, Harrell came in first, with 34% of the vote, and advanced to the general election with González, who earned 32.11%.

Harrell ran as a moderate, focusing on expanding the police force and addressing visible homelessness, and was endorsed by former governor Gary Locke, and former Seattle Mayors Norm Rice and Wesley C. Uhlman. González ran as a progressive, focusing on increasing corporate taxes and ending forced sweeps of homeless people, and was endorsed by Senators Bernie Sanders and Elizabeth Warren along with a majority of the city council.

On October 8, Harrell attended a dinner event at China Harbor restaurant. This event generated criticism, including Gonzalez, after photographs emerged of Harrell and other attendees without face masks, despite restrictions for events of its size at the time requiring attendees to be masked while not eating, drinking or sitting at their table. In the final week of the campaign, an ethics complaint was filed accusing accused Harrell of influencing a wage-theft investigation at a men's-only club that he was a member of while he was council president. Harrell released a statement in response which accused González of trying to distract voters from issues like homelessness and public safety. In the waning days of the campaign, González released an advertisement criticizing Harrell's initial support of Mayor Murray during the early stages of the abuse scandal, but pulled the ad due backlash with alleged racialized undertones of her advertisement.

In the November 2021 election, Harrell defeated González, 58% to 41%, and was sworn in as the 57th mayor of Seattle on January 1, 2022.

==== 2025 reelection ====
In December 2024, Harrell announced his intention to run for reelection in the 2025 Seattle mayoral election. This announcement included numerous high-profile endorsements, including from Governor-elect Bob Ferguson and then-King County Executive Dow Constantine. If reelected, Harrell would become the first Seattle mayor to win a second term since Greg Nickels in 2005. Harrell drew seven challengers for the August primary election, including activist Katie Wilson, actor Ry Armstrong, and 2009 Seattle mayoral election runner-up Joe Mallahan.

In the August primary, Harrell came in second, with 41.2% of the vote, and advanced to the general election with Wilson, who earned 50.8%.

During his re-election campaign, Harrell talked about public safety, transportation, and housing affordability, while criticizing Wilson's previous support for the "Defund the Police" movement. Wilson, running as a progressive, focused her campaign on homelessness and affordability, while criticizing Harrell as the "status quo" for doing little to address homelessness and the rising cost of living.

=== Tenure ===
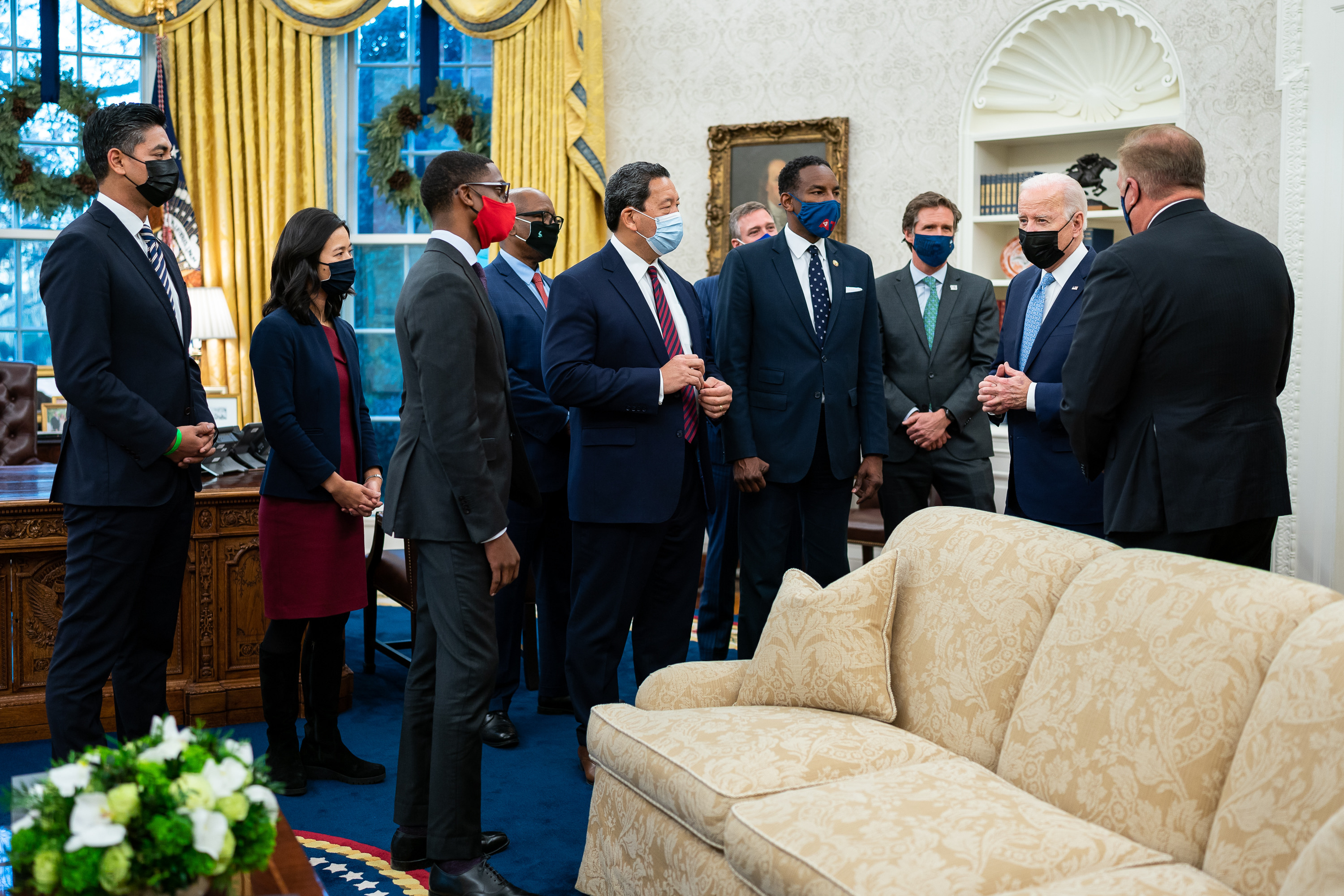
Harrell joins other individuals that had recently won mayoral elections in meeting President Joe Biden in the Oval Office of the White House.

==== Appointments and staff ====
Deputy Mayor Kendee Yamaguchi resigned in July 2022. Harrell informed his cabinet that Greg Wong, the Director of the Department of Neighborhoods, would be promoted to deputy mayor. Harrell appointed Gino Bettis, the former assistant state's attorney for Cook County, Illinois, as director of the Office of Police Accountability on August 1, 2022.

Harrell appointed Adrian Diaz, the interim chief of the Seattle Police Department, to become permanent in September 2022. In May 2024, Harrell announced Diaz' demotion from police chief to a new role in "special projects" and appointed former King County Sheriff Sue Rahr as interim chief. The demotion occurred amid lawsuits and allegations involving sexual harassment, gender discrimination, and creating a misogynistic culture in the police department, but Harrell praised Diaz in the press conference. In October 2024, Diaz was placed on paid leave during watchdog investigations into 51 allegations against him and the department. In December 2024, Harrell fired Diaz after an internal investigation found that Diaz had hired and directly supervised a romantic partner and attempted to cover it up. In May 2025, Diaz filed a lawsuit against the city over wrongful termination and discrimination, after he came out as gay.

Harrell named his niece and former campaign manager Monisha Harrell as senior deputy mayor in 2021, becoming the first black, openly gay deputy mayor in Seattle history. She resigned the position in 2023, stating her departure was amicable and over disagreements on public safety issues. In 2025, Monisha Harrell stated her departure was due to a toxic workplace against her and other women in the office. In 2025 Monisha Harrell spoke to KUOW to allege that Harrell had created a toxic work environment where he repeatedly undermined the authority of the women staffers, including herself. Six other anonymous women with ties to the Mayor's office were interviewed by KUOW, supporting Monisha Harrell's characterizations of the work environment.

==== Public Safety ====
Throughout his term, Harrell focused on increasing staffing within the Seattle Police Department (SPD) by 500 officers through higher pay and recruitment bonuses. In the first quarter of 2025, SPD saw a 500% increase in applications compared to the same period in 2024. In July 2025, the city announced that 100 new officers were hired in the first half of the year.

In the first month of his term, Harrell launched "Operation New Day," starting by expanding police presence in the Little Saigon neighborhood, which had experienced increased crime and public drug use since the start of the COVID-19 pandemic. In his February State of the City speech, Harrell vowed to clean-up crime in Little Saigon and touted that early success of the program in the neighborhood, stating "...police officers in the first 21 days of January made 23 felony arrests, 14 misdemeanor arrests." By March 2022, the drug market and illegal goods market were cleared due to daily police patrols, and the program was expanded to other "hotspots" in the city, including Downtown, due to it "successfully" working in Little Saigon.

By fall 2023, arrests for public drug use and dealing, along with daily patrols, tapered off, leading to a renewed surge in crime in Little Saigon. In November 2024, in response to a mass stabbing event in Little Saigon, Harrell announced increased police patrols, plans to install CCTV cameras, and signed an executive order aimed at discouraging "illegal vending."

In May 2025, Harrell and Seattle Police put online the Real Time Crime Center (RTCC), which monitor video and data streams to assist in addressing public safety. The RTCC would use information collected from a pilot program of CCTV cameras in high crime neighborhoods, including the Chinatown Internation District, Downtown, and Aurora Avenue. Although some citizens expressed privacy concerns, Harrell pushed for an expansion of the program in nightlife areas, the stadium district, and Garfield High School.

==== Housing ====
In August 2022, as Harrell was implementing and pushing his "One Seattle'' plan to fight homelessness, excerpts from a meeting with the Seattle Police Department were leaked to the radio station 770 KTTH. In the leaks, he said that "no one has a right to sleep on the streets" and that the "authority" was "working against" his efforts to address homelessness, criticized the King County Regional Homelessness Authority, and vowed to work against "inexperienced" City Council members. After the leak, he acknowledged his previous comments, and did not disavow them, but used what the Seattle Times characterized as more diplomatic language. Harrell asserted that he had a right to "criticize what he sees" but that he would speak with individuals who might be offended by his leaked remarks. Lisa Daugaard, the director of the Public Defender Association and overseer of the Law Enforcement Assisted Diversion (a program to provide care for those who break the law due to extreme poverty), said that the program's relationship with Harrell was still "in good shape".

In July 2022, the Pacific Northwest experienced a historic heat wave that brought dangerously high temperatures to Seattle. Harrell's administration faced harsh criticism for continuing to remove homeless encampments during the heat wave. Harell's administration removed over 8,000 tents in 2023 and 2024, breaking records for number of houseless sweeps performed while shelter capacity was reduced over the same period, exacerbating community concern around housing access and public safety.

In 2023, Harrell sought to limit the applicability of a new Washington state law that permitted the construction of fourplexes and sixplexes in zones previously zoned exclusively for single-family housing. The state law was intended to increase housing construction amid a housing shortage. In explaining Harrell's attempt to limit density and new housing construction, his spokesperson cited concerns over gentrification and displacement.

In 2024, the Harrell administration released a comprehensive 20-year housing plan that proposed to slow housing construction in Seattle.

In February 2025, Seattle held a special election to determine funding for a social housing project that voters had approved in an earlier election. Harrell, alongside business leaders, endorsed Proposition 1B, a proposal to use existing tax revenue to fund this housing, while progressive leaders endorsed Proposition 1A, a proposal to create a new business tax dedicated to funding social housing. Proposition 1A was victorious, a particularly significant loss for Harrell since it came after he had launched his reelection campaign.

==== Budget ====
In September 2024, Harrell released an $8 billion bi-annual budget proposal for 2025–2026. The proposal included a 14% increased to public safety programs, 9% increase to arts and culture, and .8% increase to affordable housing projects. To address a $250 million budget deficit, Harrell proposed using additional Jumpstart Payroll Expense Tax fund, while cutting 159 city jobs. In November 2024, Harrell signed the budget passed by the city council.

In June 2025, Harrell and councilmember Alexis Mercedes Rinck announced a reworking of the city's Business and Operations tax to raise revenues by taxing large corporations while eliminating the tax on small businesses. In August 2025, the city council unanimously passed the proposal which voters will vote to approve in the November general election.

==== Transportation ====
In July 2022, Harrell's administration reversed a decision made by former mayor Jenny Durkan to allow the Department of Transportation to issue parking violation tickets instead of the Seattle Police Department. The move resulted in the cancellation of 200,000 parking tickets issued by the Department of Transportation, with Seattle vowing to refund nearly $5 million to those who had paid the fines.

In May 2024, Harrell proposed a $1.45 billion transportation levy, the largest in the city's history, focusing on sidewalk construction and repairs, enhanced pedestrian and bicyclist connectivity to light rail stations, transit access and reliability, bridge maintenance and planning, and the maintenance and modernization of Seattle's streets. In the November general election, voters approved the levy, which was increased to $1.55 billion by the city council.

==== Climate change ====
In September 2022, Harrell signed Green New Deal legislation in Seattle, allocating $6.5 million for climate projects in the city, including funding towards efforts to get city-owned buildings off fossil fuels by 2035. In April 2025, Harrell signed an Earth Day executive order focusing on updating Seattle's climate action plan and accelerating emissions reductions, the first update to the climate action plan was released in 2013.

==== Immigration ====
In December 2024 Harrell commented on President-elect Donald Trump's planned mass deportation of illegal immigrants, stating the importance of "protecting certain communities", but also indicated that he would support mass deportation efforts of "criminals", citing "certain activities coming out of the White House that we want to embrace."

== Personal life ==
Harrell and his wife Joanne married in 1992; they have three children and live in Seward Park.

Harrell has a fourth child, and a third biological child, from a previous relationship. He estranged himself from this son throughout much of his childhood.

In 2022, Harrell was honored by Gold House (which honors those of Asian Pacific descent). The organization honored him and fellow mayors Aftab Pureval and Michelle Wu as having made the "most impact" in the field of advocacy and policy.

== Electoral history ==
=== 2007 election ===
Seattle City Council Position 3, Primary Election 2007
Candidate	Votes	%
Venus Velazquez	31,554	43.72%
Bruce Harrell	20,520	28.43%
Al Runte	9,397	13.02%
John E. Manning	5,665	7.85%
Scott Feldman	4,810	6.66%
Write-in	223	0.31%
Turnout	84,038	25.03%
Registered electors	335,746	

Seattle City Council Position 3, General Election 2007
Candidate	Votes	%
Bruce Harrell	80,839	59.88%
Venus Velazquez	53,539	39.66%
Write-in	626	0.46%
Majority	27,300	20.22%
Turnout	159,120	47.46%
Registered electors	335,276	

=== 2011 election ===
Seattle City Council Position 3, General Election 2011
Candidate	Votes	%
Bruce Harrell	96,978	61.05%
Brad Meacham	61,138	38.49%
Write-in	737	0.46%
Majority	35,840	22.56%
Turnout	197,524	52.87%
Registered electors	373,630	

=== 2013 mayoral election ===
Mayor of Seattle, Primary Election 2013
Candidate	Votes	%
Ed Murray	42,314	29.85%
Mike McGinn	40,501	28.57%
Peter Steinbrueck	22,913	16.16%
Bruce A. Harrell	21,580	15.22%
Charlie Staadecker	6,288	4.44%
Doug McQuaid	2,546	1.80%
Kate Martin, planner	2,479	1.75%
Mary Martin, factory worker	1,498	1.06%
Joey Gray	1,318	0.93%
Write-in	334	0.24%
Turnout	144,306	34.95%
Registered electors	412,847	

=== 2015 election ===
Seattle City Council District 2, Primary Election 2015
Candidate	Votes	%
Bruce Harrell	8,066	61.72%
Tammy Morales	3,223	24.66%
Josh Farris	1,725	13.20%
Write-in	55	0.42%
Turnout	13,258	26.81%
Registered electors	49,450	

Seattle City Council District 2, General Election 2015
Candidate	Votes	%
Bruce Harrell	9,532	50.79%
Tammy Morales	9,188	48.96%
Write-in	46	0.25%
Majority	344	1.83%
Turnout	19,866	39.74%
Registered electors	49,987	

=== 2021 mayoral election ===
Mayor of Seattle, Primary Election 2021
Candidate	Votes	%
Bruce Harrell	69,612	34.00%
Lorena González	65,750	32.11%
Colleen Echohawk	21,042	10.28%
Jessyn Farrell	14,931	7.29%
Arthur Langlie	11,372	5.55%
Casey Sixkiller	6,918	3.38%
Andrew Grant Houston	5,485	2.68%
James Donaldson	3,219	1.57%
Lance Randall	2,804	1.37%
Clinton Bliss	1,618	0.79%
Omari Tahir-Garrett	391	0.19%
Bobby Tucker	377	0.18%
Henry Dennison	347	0.17%
Stan Lippmann	323	0.16%
Don Rivers	189	0.09%
Write-in	386	0.19%
Total votes	206,814	100.00

Mayor of Seattle, General Election 2021
Candidate	Votes	%
Bruce Harrell	155,294	58.56%
Lorena González	109,132	41.15%
Write-in	777	0.29%
Total votes	265,203	100.00

=== 2025 mayoral election ===
Mayor of Seattle, Primary Election 2025
Candidate	Votes	%
Katie Wilson	98,562	50.75%
Bruce Harrell	80,043	41.21%
Joe Mallahan	8,538	4.40%
Ry Armstrong	2,120	1.09%
Clinton Bliss	2,046	1.05%
Isaiah Willoughby	817	0.42%
Joe Molloy	799	0.41%
Thaddeus Whelan	716	0.41%
Write-in	588	0.3%
Turnout	198,071	39.50%
Registered electors	501,438	

General election results
Candidate	Votes	%
Katie Wilson	138,931	50.20%
Bruce Harrell (incumbent)	136,920	49.47%
Write-in	911	0.33%
Total votes	280,375	100.00

== College football statistics ==
Year	Team	Def Interceptions				
Year	Team	G	Int	Yds	Avg	IntTD
1977	Washington	11	1	7	7.0	0
1978	Washington	11	1	0	0.0	0
1979	Washington	11	3	41	13.7	1
Totals		33	5	48	9.6	1

== See also ==
- Washington Huskies football statistical leaders

Political offices
Preceded by Ed Murray	Mayor of Seattle; Acting; 2017	Succeeded by Tim Burgess
Preceded by Jenny Durkan	Mayor of Seattle; 2022–2025	Succeeded by Katie Wilson
