= John E. Manning =

American politician

Member of the Seattle City Council for Position 3
- In office January 1, 1996 – December 16, 1996
- Preceded by: Sherry Harris
- Succeeded by: Richard McIver

John E. Manning is an American politician who served as a Seattle City Council member from January 1, 1996, to December 16, 1996. Manning resigned from office less than a year into his term due to two arrests for domestic violence against his then-wife.

== Biography ==
Before running for city council, Manning served as a Seattle police officer for 16 years, retiring as a sergeant. In 1996, he ran against incumbent councilmember Sherry Harris, defeating her 54% to 46%. While on council, Manning served as chair of the Transportation committee.

In October 1996, Manning was arrested for domestic violence against his wife, who claimed he slammed her into a truck. He pleaded guilty to misdemeanor domestic assault and received a deferred sentence on condition he complete a batterer's program, forfeit his right to carry a firearm, and not violate any other laws. Manning remained on the council until his subsequent arrest in December 1996 after breaking in to his estranged wife's home. He resigned from office on December 16, 1996, to focus on his defense. Manning pleaded guilty to misdemeanor trespass, served 30 days of home detention, and spent three days in jail.

After leaving the city council, Manning became a relator and volunteered with his church. In 2003, Manning ran for the Seattle City Council again, this time against incumbent Jim Compton. Manning focused his campaign on public safety and small business support, relying on his experience as a police officer and small business owner. In the September primary, Manning came in second in the four-person race, with 24.78% of the vote, and advanced to the general election with Compton, who earned 39.87%. In the general election, Compton defeated Manning, 56% to 44%.

In 2007, councilmember Peter Steinbrueck chose not to run for reelection, which drew five challengers for the open seat, which included Manning, Bruce Harrell, and former mayoral candidate Al Runte. He again focused his campaign on public safety, saying he would attach public-safety funding to every bond and levy measure that gets proposed. Manning also said he would work with state lawmakers to address what he called a regressive tax system. In the August primary, Manning came in fourth with 7.85% of the vote.

== Personal life ==
Manning is married to his second wife, with whom he has two daughters. Manning's first wife of 18 years publicly forgave him, recanting some allegations and claiming some others were exaggerated in the eye of a marital storm.
