= Al Runte =

Environmental historian and educator

Alfred Runte
- Born: April 16, 1947 (age 79); Binghamton, New York, U.S.
- Education: Binghamton University; Illinois State University; University of California, Santa Barbara
- Scientific career
- Fields: Environmental history
- Workplaces: University of Washington

Alfred "Al" Runte (April 16, 1947) is an environmental historian and former college educator from Seattle who ran for mayor of Seattle in 2005.

== Background ==
Runte was born on April 16, 1947, in Binghamton, New York, where he graduated from North High School in 1965 and the State University of New York at Binghamton in 1969. He also holds an M.A. from Illinois State University (1971) and a Ph.D. in history from the University of California, Santa Barbara (1976). Runte has taught at five institutions of higher learning, including Baylor University and the University of Washington. Runte's work focuses on parks, conservation, and public transportation. His first book, National Parks: The American Experience (1979) is a study of the national park idea. Runte has also completed a history of railroads and the environment: Allies of the Earth: Railroads and the Soul of Preservation. He advised Ken Burns on the PBS series on the U.S. national parks.

== 2005 Mayoral campaign ==
In 2005 Runte ran for Seattle mayor, achieving second place amid a field of seven candidates in the September primary election, and finally losing to incumbent Greg Nickels in the general election.

== Post-election ==
Since the election, Runte has remained a popular figure among the neighborhood parks and environmental interests in Seattle. He spoke before a crowd of diverse neighborhood groups in early 2006 which marched on Woodland Park Zoo to protest the mayor's plans to build a parking garage in the middle of a city park.

== 2007 City Council campaign ==
Runte ran for Position 3 on the Seattle City Council, formerly held by Peter Steinbrueck. Runte previously applied to fill Position 9 after it was made vacant in 2006, now held by Sally Clark.

== Books by Al Runte ==
- Burlington Northern and the Dedication of Mount St. Helens: New Legacy of a Proud Tradition. 1982.
- Public Lands, Public Heritage: The National Forest Idea. 1991. ISBN 0-911797-94-7
- Yosemite: The Embattled Wilderness. 1993. ISBN 0-8032-8941-3
- National Parks: The American Experience. 1997. ISBN 0-8032-8963-4
- Trains of Discovery: Western Railroads and the National Parks. 1998. ISBN 1-57098-231-7
- Allies of the Earth: Railroads And the Soul of Preservation. 2006. ISBN 1-931112-52-5
