= Grant Cogswell =

American screenwriter

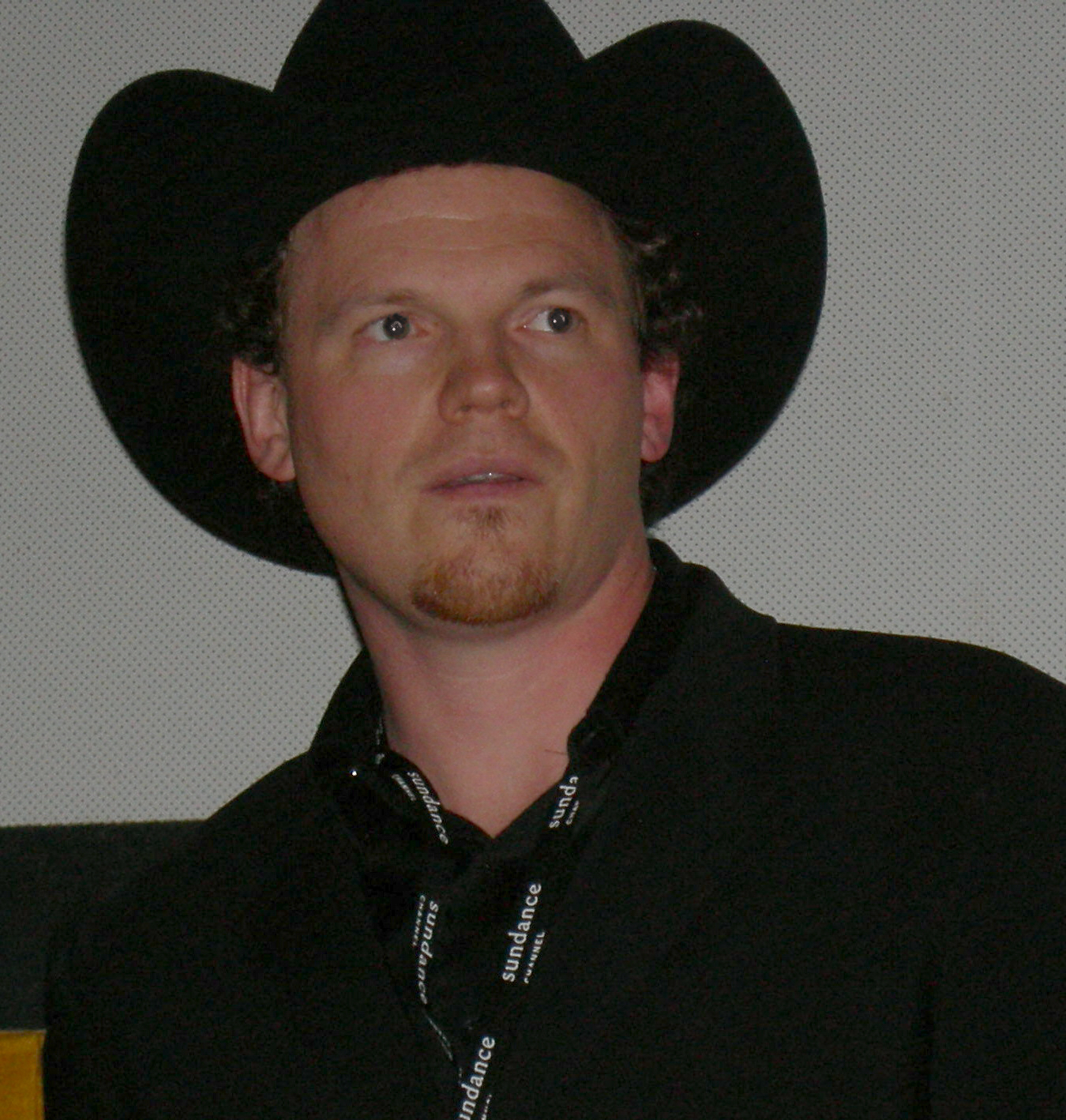
Cogswell (2007)

Grant Cogswell (born October 24, 1967) is an American screenwriter, independent film producer journalist, poet, and political activist.

== Life ==
Cogswell coauthored the Seattle Monorail Initiative, a proposal to build a citywide monorail transit system, which was voted into law in November 1997. The agency created by the law survived four challenges at the ballot; a fifth and final challenge (2005) was successful in defeating the project after questions were raised about the financing of the $1.7 billion plan.

In 2001, Cogswell campaigned for a seat on the Seattle City Council against incumbent Richard McIver. Though at the outset the chances of success were rated low by the media, Cogswell was recognized as a legitimate challenger, but his hopes were dashed by the occurrence of the primary election just seven days after the September 11 attacks.

He co-founded the People's Waterfront Coalition with architect Cary Moon in 2004, intending to fight the proposed replacement of the Alaskan Way Viaduct with a new freeway.

Cogswell entered the movie business himself in 2005 after writing a feature-length screenplay, Cthulhu, based on the works of H. P. Lovecraft. Starring Tori Spelling, the film appeared in limited theatrical release in the U.S. in 2008 and is available on DVD.

Cogswell relocated to Mexico City in 2006, where he founded Under the Volcano Books, an English-language bookstore.

== A book and a movie ==
In 2005, Cogswell's campaign manager in the race, Phil Campbell, published an account of the campaign, Zioncheck for President: A True Story of Idealism and Madness in American Politics, published by Nation Books. The book's original title came from a book-length poem Cogswell was writing at the time of the election, which was an elegy for Seattle congressman Marion Zioncheck, who committed suicide in 1936.

Film rights to the book were purchased by producer/director Stephen Gyllenhaal, and production began on his adaptation under the title Grassroots in June 2010. The film stars Joel David Moore as Cogswell, Jason Biggs as Campbell, and Cedric the Entertainer as Cogswell's opponent. The film premiered as the closing night feature at the Seattle International Film Festival on June 10, 2012.
