= Grassroots (film) =

- Directed by: Stephen Gyllenhaal
- Written by: Justin Rhodes; Stephen Gyllenhaal
- Based on: Zioncheck for President by Phil Campbell
- Produced by: Peggy Rajski; Michael Huffington; Matthew Brady; Brent Stiefel; Peggy Case
- Starring: Jason Biggs; Joel David Moore; Lauren Ambrose; Cobie Smulders; Tom Arnold; Todd Stashwick; DC Pierson; Emily Bergl; Christopher McDonald; Cedric The Entertainer
- Cinematography: Sean Porter
- Edited by: Neil Mandelberg
- Music by: Nick Urata
- Production companies: MRB Productions; Votiv Films
- Distributed by: Samuel Goldwyn Films
- Release dates: June 10, 2012 (SIFF); June 20, 2012 (United States)
- Running time: 99 minutes
- Country: United States
- Language: English
- Box office: $19,492

Grassroots is a 2012 American biographical political dark comedy film directed by Stephen Gyllenhaal, based on the book Zioncheck for President by Phil Campbell. Shot in Seattle, the film revolves around a grassroots campaign for Seattle City Council and explores what happens when a dedicated activist tries to realize a vision by seeking political office.

The film premiered on June 10, 2012, at the Seattle International Film Festival, and received a limited theatrical release in the United States on June 22. Grassroots received generally mixed reviews from critics, although Biggs' performance received praise.

== Plot ==
The film tells the story of Phil Campbell (Jason Biggs), a journalist who has just lost his job and gets roped into leading Grant Cogswell's political campaign. Grant, played by Joel David Moore, is Phil's enthusiastic and eccentric friend whose passion for the Seattle Monorail Project inspires him to run for Seattle City Council. Grant is running against the incumbent, Richard McIver, played by Cedric the Entertainer. Although McIver has more money and more supporters, Grant's blind passion paired with Phil's strategy makes Grant a contender.

== Cast ==
- Jason Biggs as Phil Campbell
- Joel David Moore as Grant Cogswell
- Lauren Ambrose as Emily Bowen
- Cobie Smulders as Clair
- Tom Arnold as Tommy
- Emily Bergl as Theresa Glendon
- Todd Stashwick as Nick Ricochet
- Cedric the Entertainer as Richard McIver
- DC Pierson as Wayne
- Christopher McDonald as Jim Tripp

== Reception ==
The review aggregator Rotten Tomatoes reported an approval rating of 50%, with an average score of 5.2/10, based on 30 reviews. Metacritic, which uses a weighted average, assigned the film a score of 41 out of 100 based on reviews from 9 critics, indicating "generally mixed or average reviews."

Francesca Steele of The Independent gave the film a positive review and specifically praised Biggs' performance, stating his "American Pie routine - geeky nice guy stepping out of his comfort zone - has stuck with him for a reason. He is great here as the reluctant idealist torn between sense and optimism." Stephanie Zacharek of NPR gave the film a negative review, calling it "a movie where bad ideas, because they're the ones championed by the "correct" side, are king. It never acknowledges that sometimes idealism is just another kind of manipulation." However, she also praised Biggs' performance, but criticized the film's writing.
