= Marion Zioncheck =

American politician (1900–1936)

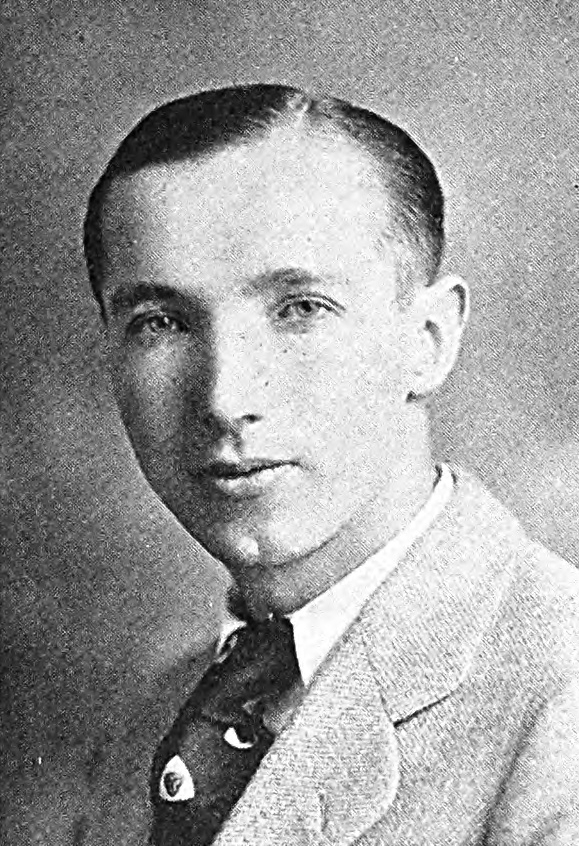
- Zioncheck c. 1927

Member of the U.S. House of Representatives from Washington's 1st district
- In office March 4, 1933 – August 7, 1936
- Preceded by: Ralph Horr
- Succeeded by: Warren Magnuson

Personal details
- Born: Marjan Antoni Zajaczek; December 5, 1900 Kęty, Austria-Hungary
- Died: August 7, 1936 (aged 35) Seattle, Washington, U.S.
- Party: Democratic
- Spouse: Rubye Louise Nix (m. 1936)
- Parents: Clemens Zajaczek (father); Frances Wlodyga (mother)
- Education: University of Washington; University of Washington School of Law
- Occupation: Lawyer; Politician

Marion Anthony Zioncheck (born Marjan Antoni Zajaczek; December 5, 1900 – August 7, 1936) was an American politician who served as a member of the United States House of Representatives from 1933 until his death. He represented Washington's 1st congressional district as a Democrat.

Having struggled with his mental health during his service in Congress, Zioncheck killed himself by autodefenestration in August 1936.

== Early life ==
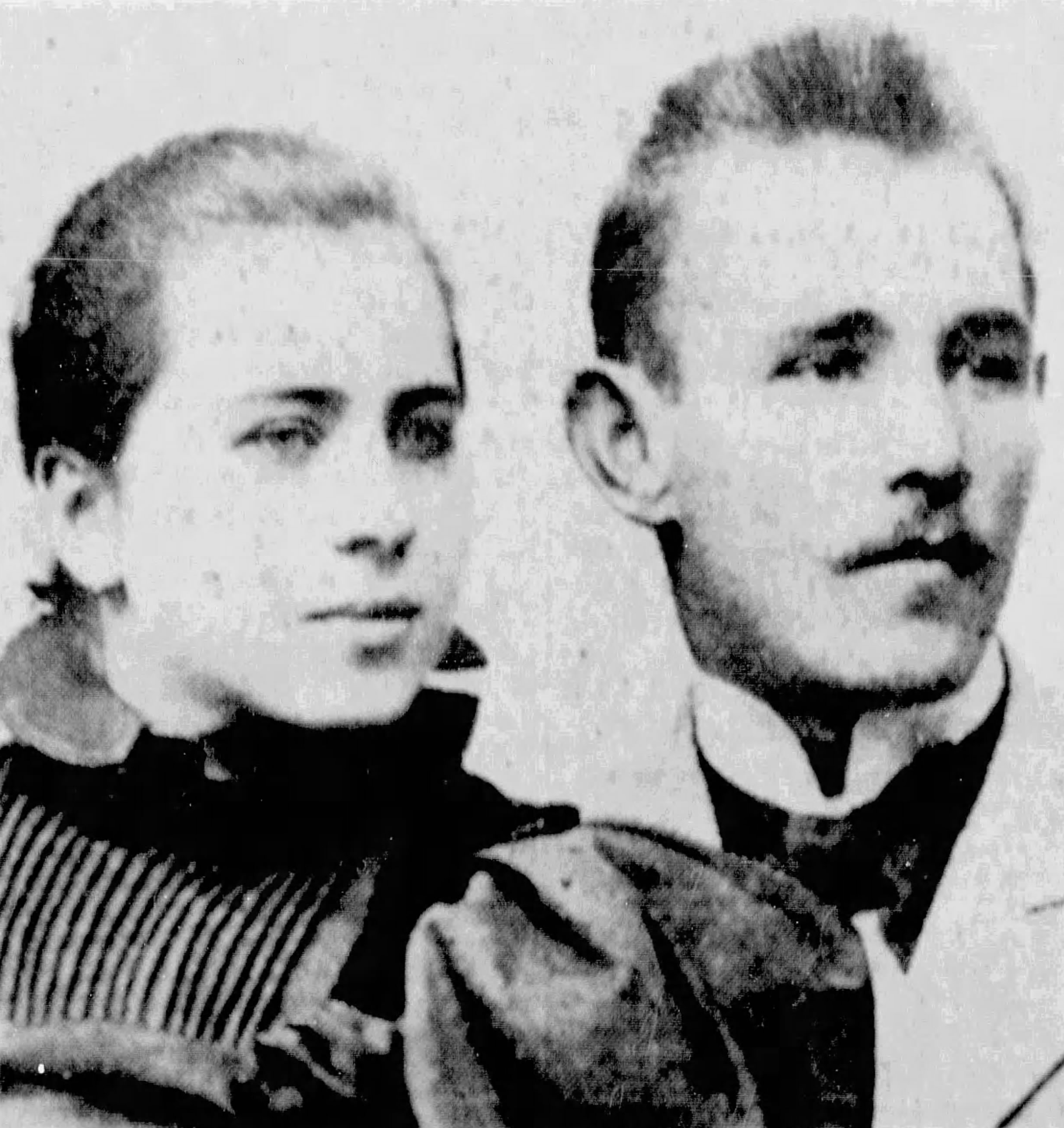
Zioncheck's parents at the time they were married

Zioncheck was born Marjan Antoni Zajaczek in Kęty, Austria-Hungary (now in Poland), the son of Clemens and Frances (née Wlodiga) Zajaccek (later Zioncheck). His family immigrated to the United States in 1904, and they settled in Seattle, Washington. He attended the University of Washington where in 1927 he became president of the student government (ASUW).

He also earned a law degree from the University of Washington while earning recognition as a left-wing leader in the Democratic Party and the Washington Commonwealth Federation. The Federation would support his election to Congress in 1932.

== Congress ==
As a U.S. Representative, Zioncheck was known mostly for ardently championing Franklin D. Roosevelt's New Deal policies. But his tireless work on behalf of the New Deal often was overshadowed by his many personal escapades, which included dancing in fountains and driving on the White House lawn. Beset by the press and by critics of Roosevelt's policies, Zioncheck became depressed and stated that he would not seek reelection to a third term in 1936.

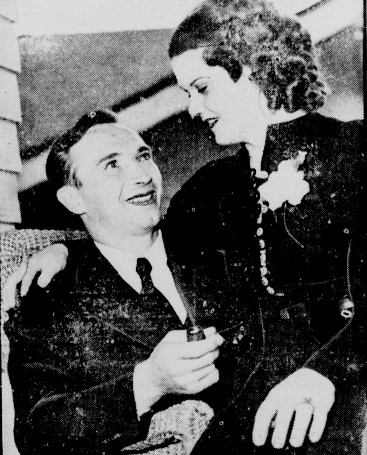
Marion and Rubye

In his diary entry for April 30, 1936, Secretary of the Interior Harold L. Ickes recounted how Zioncheck had asked him to officiate at a wedding with his fiancée, Rubye Louise Nix. Ickes demurred, saying that he had no authority to do so; he was aware of Zioncheck's reputation and simply did not want to get involved. Ultimately, Zioncheck went to Annapolis, Maryland for the wedding and San Juan, Puerto Rico for his honeymoon. On August 1, Zioncheck's friend and ally, King County Prosecutor Warren Magnuson, took him at his word regarding his retirement plans and filed to run for Zioncheck's House seat.

Zioncheck's antics attracted attention. The United Press later described him as having become a "national joke".

=== Stay at mental hospital ===
Zioncheck at Gallinger Hospital in Washington, D.C.
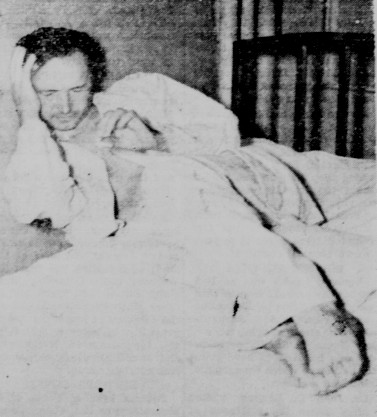
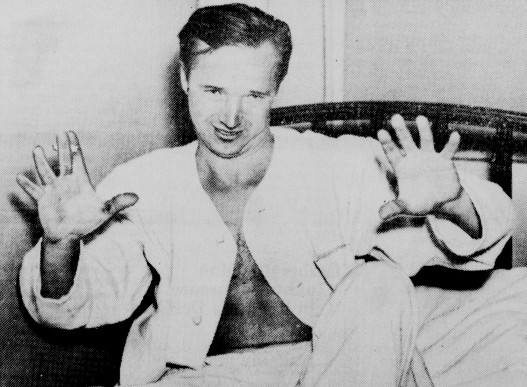
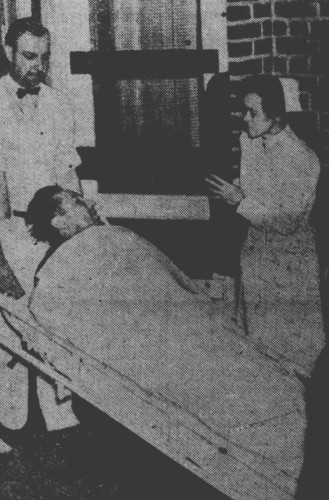
(Top) Zioncheck holding his hand to his head as photos are taken of him in his hospital bed; (middle) Zioncheck holds up his hands while talking to reporters from his hospital bed; (bottom) Zioncheck wrapped in sheets and bound to a stretcher at Gallinger Hospital.

On May 30, 1936, Zioncheck's wife left him after an argument during a party at their apartment. On June 1, he became frantic and searched Washington, D.C. for her. He was arrested later that day on a lunacy warrant. He was confined in Gallinger Municipal Hospital Psychopathic Ward, during which his wife returned to him. Doctors blamed overwork and his hectic lifestyle.

He was later transferred to a private facility in Towson, Maryland, but escaped and fled to Washington, where he received congressional immunity.

=== Suicide ===
Zioncheck died after plummeting to the sidewalk from a window of his office on the fifth floor of the Arctic Building, at 3rd Avenue and Cherry Street in downtown Seattle, on August 7, 1936. He struck the pavement directly in front of a car occupied by his wife. A note was found; it read, "My only hope in life was to improve the condition of an unfair economic system that held no promise to those that all the wealth of even a decent chance to survive let alone live."

Zioncheck was mourned at his early death; both the University of Washington and Boeing closed down for half a day in his honor. He is buried in Evergreen Washelli Memorial Park in Seattle.

His widow, as Rubye Nix Wilson, would later become a well-known artist, and was exhibited at the Museum of Modern Art and the Kennedy Center.

== Legacy ==
Zioncheck is the subject of an unpublished book-length poem by Grant Cogswell, entitled Ode to Congressman Marion Zioncheck. The story of Zioncheck, and Cogswell's obsession with him, is detailed in Phil Campbell's 2005 book Zioncheck for President: A True Story of Idealism and Madness in American Politics (Nation Books; ISBN 1-56025-750-4). The option to make Campbell's book into a feature film was purchased in 2007 by Stephen Gyllenhaal.

The Ballad of Marion Zioncheck, released by indie musician Left at London on her 2021 album T.I.A.P.F.Y.H., recounts the story of Zioncheck's life.

== See also ==
- List of members of the United States Congress who died in office (1900–1949)
- List of United States representatives from Washington

U.S. House of Representatives
Preceded by Ralph Horr	Member of the U.S. House of Representatives from Washington's 1st congressional district March 4, 1933-August 7, 1936	Succeeded by Warren Magnuson
