= Phil Campbell (writer) =

American author and documentary producer

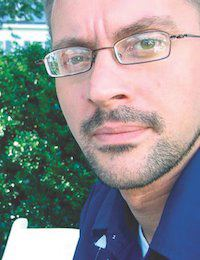
- Phil Campbell
- Born: Phillip Gerard Campbell; 21 November 1972 (age 53); Toledo, Ohio
- Education: Northwestern University
- Occupation: writer
- Spouse: Emily Hall (m. 2002)
- Children: 1 son

Phil Campbell (born 1972) is an American author and documentary producer. He is the author of the book Zioncheck for President upon which the film Grassroots is based. The book, a mix of memoir and gonzo journalism, is set around Campbell's time as campaign manager for a Seattle city council candidate. The book's title references Marion Zioncheck, a United States Congressman from the state of Washington who committed suicide in 1936.

Campbell is also the organizer of the Phil Campbell Convention, held since 1995 in Phil Campbell, Alabama. He also organized the "I'm With Phil" campaign, a relief effort to help the residents of the town after a devastating tornado.

== Selected bibliography ==
- Zioncheck for President: A True Story of Idealism and Madness in American Politics (Nation Books, 2005). Reprinted as Grassroots: Politics . . . But Not As Usual (Nation Books, 2012)
