= Lorena González (Seattle politician) =

American politician

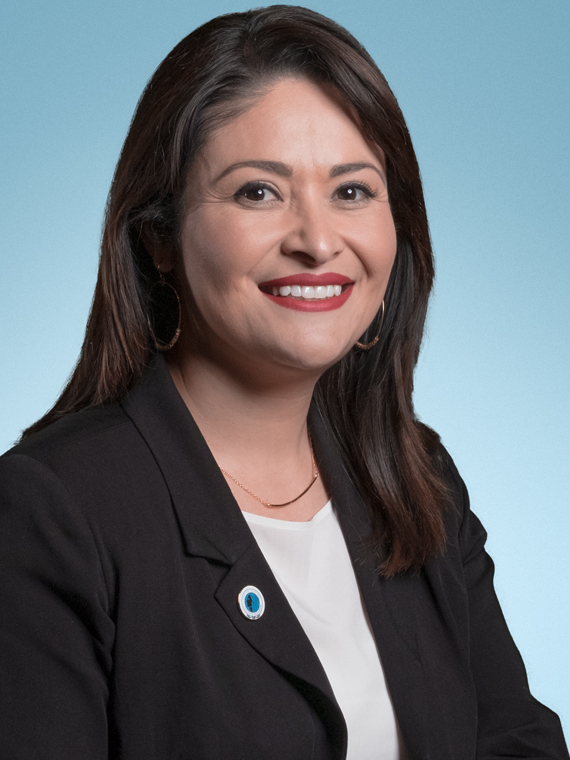

President of the Seattle City Council
- In office January 6, 2020 – January 1, 2022
- Preceded by: Bruce Harrell
- Succeeded by: Debora Juarez

Member of the Seattle City Council for Position 9
- In office November 24, 2015 – January 1, 2022
- Preceded by: John Okamoto
- Succeeded by: Sara Nelson

Personal details
- Born: Maria Lorena González; February 20, 1977 (age 49) Prosser, Washington, U.S.
- Party: Democratic
- Children: 1
- Education: Yakima Valley College; Washington State University (BA); Seattle University (JD)
- Website: Campaign website

Maria Lorena González (born February 20, 1977) is an American lawyer and former politician who was a member of the Seattle City Council from position 9. She was the first Latina elected to the council. She was a candidate for mayor of Seattle in 2021 but was defeated by Bruce Harrell 59 percent to 41 percent.

== Early life and education ==
González was born on February 20, 1977, in Prosser, Washington and raised in Grandview. She has five siblings. Her parents came to the United States as undocumented immigrants in the early-1960s and became legal permanent residents in the 1970s. Her mother became a citizen in 1996. She described her early life as a "Spanish-speaking migrant farmworker household." González was crowned Grandview Miss Junior in 1994.

González attended Yakima Valley College at the Grandview Campus and earned a degree in business from Washington State University in 1999. During this time, she says she worked three jobs and relied on assistance from scholarships to pay for her education. She moved to Seattle in 2002 and began attending the Seattle University School of Law, earning her Juris Doctor in 2005.

== Career ==
After graduating from law school, González worked for a short time as an attorney at Gordon Thomas Honeywell and then for seven years with the law firm of Schroeter, Goldmark, and Bender. In 2012, she represented a Latino man in a civil rights case against the city of Seattle for discriminatory police conduct. Her client received a $150,000 settlement, but she told The Seattle Times that the Seattle Police Department seemed incapable of admitting that the incident was an example of biased policing. In 2014, she became legal counsel to Seattle Mayor Ed Murray.

=== Seattle City Council ===
==== 2015 election ====
In 2015, González ran for the ninth position on the Seattle City Council after Sally J. Clark dropped her reelection bid for one of the two remaining at-large seats on the council. She left her job in the Murray administration to campaign full-time. In the August primary, González came in first, with 65% of the vote, and advanced to the general election with community activist Bill Bradford.

González and Bradford both ran as progressives, and both candidates criticized the city's growth and lack of affordability. Bradford accused González of being in a cabal of "unfettered capitalists," while González said Bradford focused to narrowly on city growth plans. González received a wide range of endorsements from business groups, labor unions, Mayor Murray and The Stranger, while Bradford received endorsements from some Democrat leaders.

In the November general election González defeated Bradford, 78% to 21%.

==== 2017 election ====
In 2017, González ran for reelection and faced six challengers in the primary, which included a supermarket cashier, a homeless person, a South Seattle neighborhood activist, and a quixotic blogger. The King County Labor Council, King County Democrats, the political arm of the Seattle Metropolitan Chamber of Commerce, Planned Parenthood and the Sierra Club endorsed her. In the August primary election, González came in first, with 64.17% of the vote, and advanced to the general election with president of the Mount Baker Community Club Pat Murakami, who earned 19.71%.

González focused her campaign on her record on the city council, including her work on police reform, her championing of a $1 million legal-defense fund for immigrants and refugees facing deportation, and her role in helping establish a city-paid family leave policy. Murakami criticized González in her role as chair of the public safety committee, saying the council was too slow on adopting police body cameras, and failing to negotiate a new police contract.

In the November general election, Gonzalez defeated Murakami, 70.75% to 28.87%.

==== Tenure ====
Gonzalez took office on November 24, 2015, and replaced John Okamoto, who was temporarily on the council after Clark resigned to take a job at the University of Washington. González was the first Latina to be elected to the council. She was selected as the Council President in January 2020, succeeding Bruce Harrell.

While on the council, González advanced legislation that created scheduling protections for retail and restaurant workers and legislation that backed workload restrictions for hotel workers. Other progressive legislation that she pushed for included funding legal defense for immigrants and an expanded subsidized pre-school program. She also co-wrote a gun storage law.

On policing, González passed a 2017 police oversight reform law, but in 2018, she supported a 2018 contract that undermined those reforms. As public safety chair, she approved multiple police budget increases, but in 2020, supported a 50% reduction in the police budget in response to Black Lives Matter protestors. The council passed a 20% reduction in the police budget, which González supported.

González was a supporter of the Bernie Sanders 2020 presidential campaign.

=== 2020 attorney general campaign ===
On August 8, 2019, González announced her intention to run for state attorney general in 2020, to replace Bob Ferguson, who was expected to run for governor. She also announced her intention to remain a member of the Seattle City Council during the campaign. On August 22, 2019, González suspended her campaign following Ferguson's decision to run for re-election after Jay Inslee announced he was running for a third term as governor.

=== 2021 Seattle mayoral election ===
In February 2021, after Mayor Jenny Durkan stated that she would not seek reelection, González announced her candidacy for the 2021 Seattle mayoral election. In her announcement, González said Seattle needed "bold, transformative action" and that "I believe we need everyone, especially big business to do their part." joined a crowded primary field of 15 candidates, which included former Council President Bruce Harrell, Chief Seattle Club Executive Director Colleen Echohawk, former state representative Jessyn Farrell, and architect Andrew Grant Houston. In the August primary, Harrell came in first, with 34% of the vote, and advanced to the general election with González, who earned 32.11%.

González ran as a progressive, focusing on increasing corporate taxes and ending forced sweeps of homeless people, and was endorsed by Senators Bernie Sanders and Elizabeth Warren along with a majority of the city council. Harrell ran as a moderate, focusing on expanding the police force and addressing visible homelessness, and was endorsed by former governor Gary Locke, and former Seattle Mayors Norm Rice and Wesley C. Uhlman.

In the final days of the election, Gonzalez released an ad that focused on Harrell's initial support of Ed Murray during the abuse scandal. The ad featured a white woman, who was a rape survivor but not a Murray accuser, who stated that she could not trust Harrell because he sided with Murray. González would pull the ad, and apologized saying, "I am sorry we did not work harder to center the voice of a sexual assault survivor from our community of color who was also willing to tell their story."

In the final week of the campaign, Harrell faced an ethics complaint that accused Harrell of influencing a wage-theft investigation at a men's-only club that he was a member of while he was council president. Harrell released a statement accusing González of trying to distract voters from issues like homelessness and public safety.

In the November 2021 election, Harrell defeated González, 58% to 41%, and was sworn in as the 57th mayor of Seattle on January 1, 2022.

== Personal life ==
González has lived in Seattle since 2002 and currently resides in West Seattle's Alaska Junction. Gonzalez married her husband in 2017, and they have one daughter together.

== Electoral history ==
=== 2015 election ===
Seattle City Council Position 9, Primary Election 2015
Candidate	Votes	%
M. Lorena González	77,839	65.02%
Bill Bradburd	17,895	14.95%
Alon Bassok	10,946	9.14%
Thomas A. Tobin	9,361	7.82%
Omari Tahir-Garrett	1,854	1.55%
Alex Tsimerman	1,470	1.23%
Write-in	344	0.29%
Total votes	126,012	100.00
Turnout	126,012	30.41%
Registered electors	414,340	

Seattle City Council Position 9, General Election 2015
Candidate	Votes	%
M. Lorena González	128,588	78.06%
Bill Bradburd	35,293	21.43%
Write-in	844	0.51%
Majority	93,293	56.63%
Total votes	191,267	100.00
Turnout	191,267	45.62%
Registered electors	419,292	

=== 2017 election ===
Seattle City Council Position 9, Primary Election 2017
Party	Candidate	Votes	%
Nonpartisan	M. Lorena González	108,602	64.17%
Nonpartisan	Pat Murakami	33,349	19.71%
Nonpartisan	David Preston	14,503	8.57%
Nonpartisan	Pauly Giuglianotti	3,782	2.23%
Nonpartisan	Eric W. Smiley	3,069	1.81%
Nonpartisan	Ian Affleck-Asch	2,585	1.53%
Nonpartisan	Ty Pethe	2,574	1.52%
Nonpartisan	Write-in	768	0.45%
Turnout		187,741	40.49%
Registered electors		463,660	

Seattle City Council Position 9, General Election 2017
Party	Candidate	Votes	%
Nonpartisan	M. Lorena González	143,839	70.75%
Nonpartisan	Pat Murakami	58,700	28.87%
Nonpartisan	Write-in	779	0.38%
Majority		85,139	41.88%
Turnout		224,808	49.21%
Registered electors		456,871	

=== 2021 mayoral election ===
Mayor of Seattle, Primary Election 2021
Candidate	Votes	%
Bruce Harrell	69,612	34.00%
Lorena González	65,750	32.11%
Colleen Echohawk	21,042	10.28%
Jessyn Farrell	14,931	7.29%
Arthur Langlie	11,372	5.55%
Casey Sixkiller	6,918	3.38%
Andrew Grant Houston	5,485	2.68%
James Donaldson	3,219	1.57%
Lance Randall	2,804	1.37%
Clinton Bliss	1,618	0.79%
Omari Tahir-Garrett	391	0.19%
Bobby Tucker	377	0.18%
Henry Dennison	347	0.17%
Stan Lippmann	323	0.16%
Don Rivers	189	0.09%
Write-in	386	0.19%
Total votes	206,814	100.00

Mayor of Seattle, General Election 2021
Candidate	Votes	%
Bruce Harrell	155,294	58.56%
Lorena González	109,132	41.15%
Write-in	777	0.29%
Total votes	265,203	100.00
