= Cthulhu (2007 film) =

- Theatrical release poster
- Directed by: Daniel Gildark
- Written by: Grant Cogswell; Dan Gildark
- Based on: The Shadow over Innsmouth by H. P. Lovecraft
- Produced by: Jeffrey Brown; Anne Rosellini
- Starring: Tori Spelling; Cara Buono; Jason Cottle
- Distributed by: Regent Releasing
- Release dates: June 14, 2007 (Seattle International Film Festival); August 22, 2008 (United States)
- Running time: 100 minutes
- Country: United States
- Language: English
- Box office: $15,513

Cthulhu is a 2007 American horror film directed by Dan Gildark and co-written by Grant Cogswell and Daniel Gildark. The film is loosely based on the novella The Shadow over Innsmouth (1936) by H. P. Lovecraft.

The film moves the story from New England to the Pacific Northwest. The film is notable among works adapted from Lovecraft's work for having a gay protagonist. Screenwriter Grant Cogswell explained that he and Gildark chose to exploit the metaphor for the horror faced by a gay person returning for a relative's funeral and having to face the horrors of small-town life.

The film premiered June 14, 2007, at the Seattle International Film Festival and officially opened in select theatrical venues August 22, 2008.

== Plot ==
When young history professor Russ is called upon by his sister to execute their late mother's estate, he is reunited with boyhood friend Mike, and with his father, the charismatic leader of a New Age cult. While exploring his memories, Russ wanders into a warehouse where hundreds of names are listed on the walls. As he sleeps that night, he dreams of a stone cudgel and awakens to find a cudgel (with the word Dagon written on it) in his motel room; the town drunk warns him that it is an instrument of sacrifice. A young liquor store clerk enlists him to help find her brother, whom she believes has been taken by the cult. Russ's aunt, who has been living in an asylum, tells him that his mother left a message hidden in her house.

Looking for answers in the warehouse, Russ is taken on an unbelievable journey through the small town's ancient, subterranean origins. When he escapes, he and Mike find the girl's brother murdered. Russ begins to believe preparations are underway for a mass sacrifice, and engages the attentions of a seductress in order to obtain information. He is raped and arrested for murder on the eve of the May Festival. The stakes are raised when Russ discovers that the cult intends to take over the world by raising anthropomorphic creatures from the sea.

Russ is shown his children in a bathtub. The film ends with Russ and his best friend/lover being held by the cult, as Russ' father orders him to sacrifice the man he loves. Russ moves to strike someone.

== Cast ==
- Cara Buono as Dannie
- Jason Cottle as Russ
- Richard Garfield as Zadok
- Ian Geoghegan as Ralph
- Scott Green as Mike
- Dennis Kleinsmith as Reverend Marsh
- Amy Minderhout as Julia
- Robert Padilla as Ancestor
- Tori Spelling as Susan
- Nancy Stark as Aunt Josie
- Hunter Stroud as Teen Russ
- Rob Hamm as Jake

== Critical reception ==
On the review aggregator website Rotten Tomatoes, 62% of 13 critics' reviews are positive. Metacritic, which uses a weighted average, assigned the film a score of 41 out of 100, based on 6 critics, indicating "mixed or average" reviews.

Maitland McDonagh wrote, "it's a thoughtful and sometimes very creepy film that tackles big themes on a small budget and proves that in the right hands, ideas can trump special effects." Steve Barton of Dread Central wrote, "Cthulhu is high on ambition and originality and the closest we've come to a true H. P. Lovecraft film." Conversely, Mark Olsen of the Los Angeles Times wrote, "Cthulhu isn't awful, but it isn't particularly compelling either," while John Anderson of Variety wrote, "the acting is so emotionally unhinged and erratic it borders on camp."
