= Sherry Harris =

American politician (born 1957)

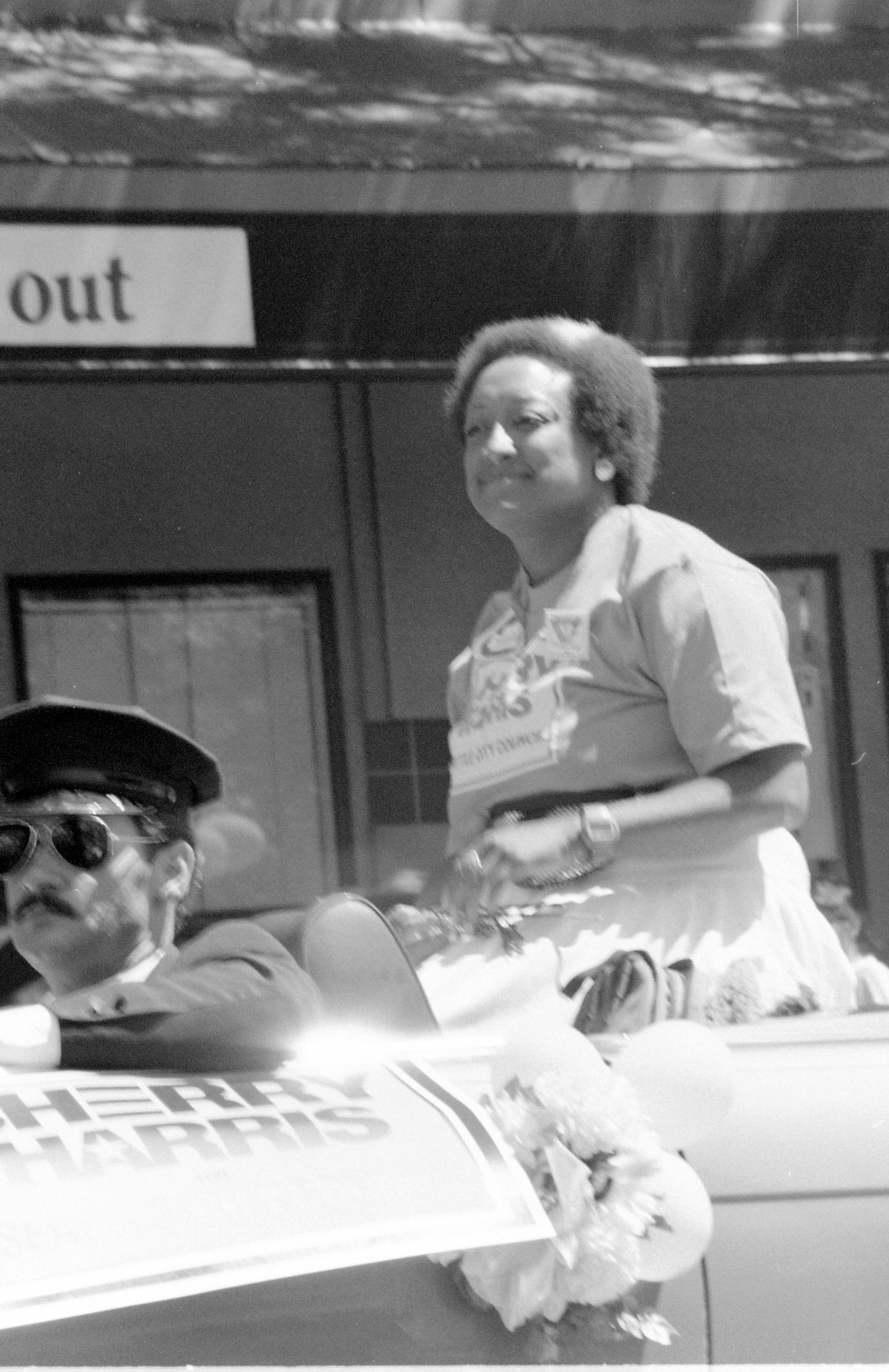
- Sherry Harris, Seattle Pride 1995

Member of the Seattle City Council for Position 3
- In office January 1, 1992 – January 1, 1996
- Preceded by: Sam Smith
- Succeeded by: John E. Manning

Personal details
- Born: February 27, 1957 (age 69) Newark, New Jersey
- Education: New Jersey Institute of Technology (BS, MBA)

Sherry D. Harris (born February 27, 1957) is an American activist and politician who served as a member of the Seattle City Council from 1992 to 1996. She was the first out black lesbian elected to public office in the United States.

== Early life and education ==
Harris was born on February 27, 1957, in Newark, New Jersey, to a single mom. She grew up in Newark's ghetto as an only child and experienced poverty and other hardships, including the 1967 Newark riots.

In 1978, Harris graduated from New Jersey Institute of Technology with a degree in Human Factors Engineering (Ergonomic Engineering) and later earned her Master of Business Administration. After college she would move to Seattle, working at Pacific Northwest Bell Telephone Company and Boeing as an engineer. She was active in community activism around Seattle focusing on city improvements, women's rights, and LGBT rights.

== Seattle City Council ==
=== 1991 election ===
Harris ran in the 1991 Seattle City Council against longtime councilmember Sam Smith, who was the first Black person to be elected to the Seattle City Council. Due to health complications related to diabetes, and long hospitalizations, Smith was unable to run an effective campaign against Harris.

In the November general election, Harris won in a landslide with 65% of the vote compared to Smith's 35%. Harris would be the first elected black lesbian to elected office.

=== Tenure ===
While in office, Harris chaired the council's Housing, Health, Human Services and Education Committee and served on the Transportation and Utilities Committees. She co-sponsored and supported several pro-LGBT legislation and would help raise over $1 million to fight anti-gay ordinances in the state of Washington. Harris was also instrumental in adding 50 additional low-income housing units at Sand Point.

Although her historic status as a triple minority, being a black woman who was a lesbian, was an asset during her election and could be considered a hindrance while in office. Harris would state, "My triple minority status proved to be controversial while I was in office, but it gave me a unique perspective on civil rights," and "I had greater expectations put on me, yet who I am as a minority has nothing to do as to why I want to be on the council."

=== 1995 and 1997 elections ===
In 1995, Harris ran for reelection and her major opponent was John E. Manning, a Seattle Police Department sergeant. In the general election, Manning would defeat Harris, 54% to 46%.

In 1997, Harris ran again for city council against a YMCA director Richard Conlin. Harris would have some missteps in the election, like not mentioning she was a lesbian when attempting to get the endorsement of the Harvey Muggy Democrats, a gay political organization. Harris would lose in a landslide to Conlin, 66% to 34%.

=== Sexual harassment complaint ===
In 1994, an intern turned paid staffer of Harris accused the councilmember of sexual harassment and creating a toxic work environment. At the time, Harris denied the allegations stating, "Anyone who knows me or has dealt with me...knows that any rumor, innuendo, claim or suggestion of harassment or discrimination on my part is absurd..." and would claim that the complaint was blackmail. According to the former staffer, Rev. Dorinda Henry, Harris threatened her if she chose to file a complaint by saying, "I'll destroy you. You won't be able to do anything in this city," Henry would be fired from her position after filing the sexual harassment complaint with the city. In a 2018 interview, Harris would continue to deny the sexual harassment allegations stating, "I've never sexually harassed anyone, and certainly not my interns".

== Personal life ==
During her first election and tenure in office, Harris was in a domestic partnership with Judith Scalise, but it ended after her 1995 election loss.

Harris published her book, Changing the World from the Inside Out: Politics for the New Millennium, in 2010. She started her own business, Seattle: Spirit Mind Body Educational Resources, focusing on teaching core skills for living consciously and manifesting intended results.
