= Richard McIver =

American politician

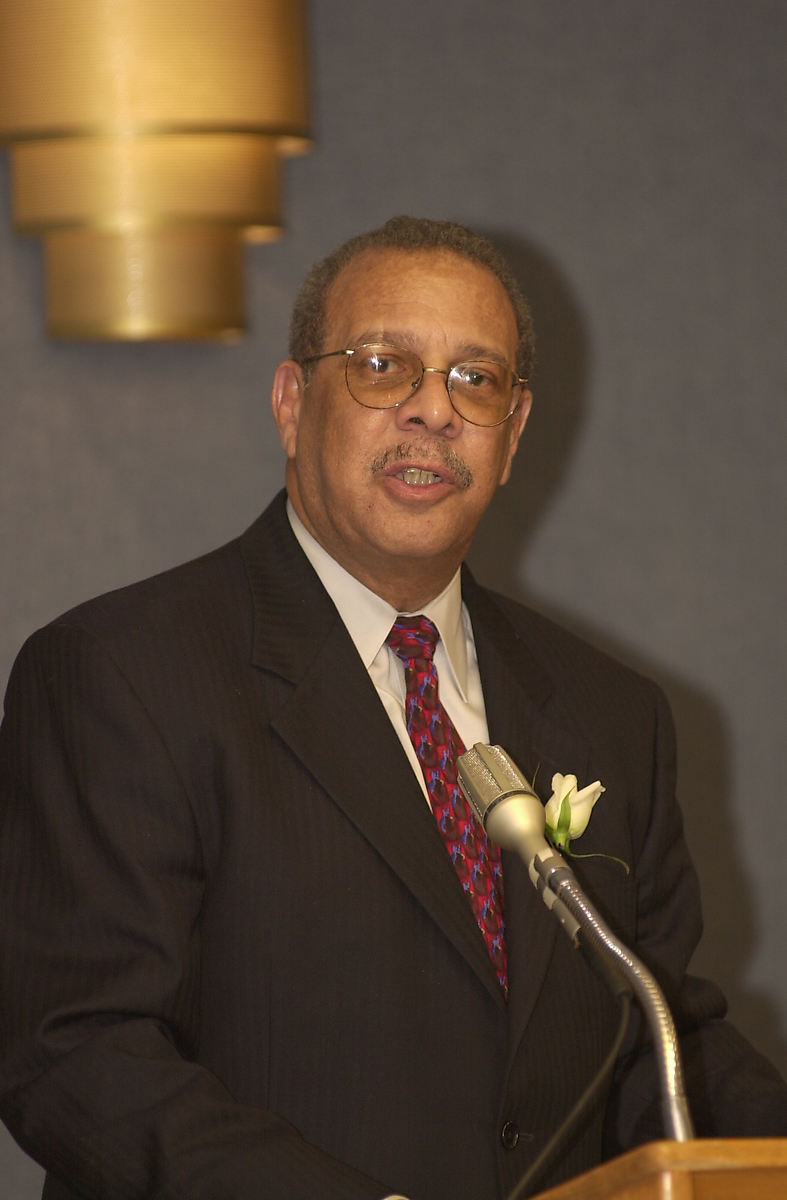

Member of the Seattle City Council, Position 8
- In office November 1997 – January 2010
- Preceded by: Cheryl Chow
- Succeeded by: Mike O'Brien

Member of the Seattle City Council, Position 3
- In office January 1997 – November 1997
- Preceded by: John E. Manning
- Succeeded by: Peter Steinbrueck

Personal details
- Born: Richard Jeffrey McIver; June 14, 1941 Seattle, Washington
- Died: March 9, 2013 (aged 71) Seattle, Washington
- Website: http://www.seattle.gov/council/mciver/

Richard McIver (June 14, 1941 – March 9, 2013) was a member of the Seattle City Council. He was selected from 114 applicants to fill a vacancy on the Council in January 1997 after John E. Manning resigned due to a domestic violence arrest. McIver then ran for the seat vacated by Cheryl Chow, who ran for mayor, and was elected in November 1997 and was reelected in 2001 and 2005.

== Biography ==
McIver was born June 14, 1941, to Mildred Artis-McIver and William McIver II in Seattle, Washington. At six, his family moved to Kodiak, Alaska where his father worked as a civilian heavy-equipment mechanic for the U.S. Navy. He graduated from Garfield High School in 1959, and received a bachelor's degree in Community Development from Western Washington University.

After college, McIver served 16 years with the City of Seattle in the Office of Urban Renewal and the Department of Community Development. After working for the city of Seattle, he worked at a consulting firm administering HUD grants and the Tacoma Housing Authority. Before running for city council, McIver was the Executive Director of the Washington Association for Community Economic Development.

== Seattle City Council ==
=== Appointment and elections ===
In December 1996, Seattle City Councilmember John Manning resigned after pleading guilty to domestic violence. In January 1997, McIver was selected out of 114 candidates to fill the remaining two years of Manning's term. In June 1997, he announced he would run for a full term to the council in Position 8 after Cheryl Chow announced she would run for mayor. In the November general election, McIver defeated land surveyor Kerman Kermoade in a landslide, 78% to 22%.

McIver ran for reelection in 2001, and in the September primary, he came in first with 49% of the vote. He advanced to the general election with Grant Cogswell, a music critic and Seattle Center Monorail booster, who earned 26% of the vote. Both candidates ran a polite campaign, but Cogswell focused his campaign criticizing McIver on his lack of support of the monorail. In the general election, McIver defeated Cogswell, 54% to 46%. On election day, McIver drove Cogswell and his girlfriend to the polls because they did to have a car, and had a drink after the election. In a film about that campaign, Grassroots, McIver was played by Cedric the Entertainer.

McIver faced two challengers in his 2005 reelection bid, King County Councilman Dwight Pelz and real estate broker Robert Rosencrantz. In the September primary, McIver came in first with 39% of the vote and advanced to the general election with Pelz who earned 33%. In the general election, Pelz accused McIver of ducking tough issues, neglecting schools and bowing to Mayor Greg Nickels while McIver accused Pelz of being ineffective, hypocritical and too combative to work with the council. In the November general election, McIver defeated Pelz, 53% to 47%.

=== Tenure ===
McIver chaired the City Council's Housing & Economic Development Committee. He was vice-chair of the Environment, Emergency Management and Utilities Committee and was a member of the Transportation Committee. He was an alternate member of the Energy & Technology Committee. (From 2004 through 2007, he was the chair of the Council's Budget & Finance Committee.)

McIver was strongly identified with Rainier Valley, one of Seattle's poorer neighborhoods. According to at least one obituary, his greatest achievement in office was the creation of a $50 million Rainier Valley Community Development Fund, and he was "deeply worried" about Link light rail impacting "immigrant- and minority-owned businesses along Rainier Avenue."

During the protests surrounding the Seattle World Trade Organization Ministerial Conference of 1999, McIver, on his way to an official dinner, was, according to fellow councilmember Jean Godden, "stopped by a Seattle policeman who did not recognize him as a council member, refused to believe he was a public official, and insisted on making him stand spreadeagled up against his car." "He never forgot that, not so much because of the indignity to him, but that others did not believe an African American might be a city councilmember."

In February 2009, McIver announced his decision not to seek reelection.

=== Domestic violence charges and ethics violation ===
On October 10, 2007, McIver was arrested at his South Seattle home on domestic violence charges following an altercation that occurred with his wife early that morning. Charges were subsequently dropped as his wife refused to testify.

In May 2008, Seattle's Ethics office accused McIver of violating the city's conflict-of-interest law by awarding a $37,000 no-bid contract to a company affiliated with a longtime friend who has hosted the council member's annual vacations to a Virgin Islands condominium. McIver stated that he had "declined to pay a settlement penalty presented by the Ethics and Elections Commission executive director, and [he] intend[ed] to vigorously challenge these baseless charges." McIver paid the $1,000 fine using tax dollars.

== Post-council ==
McIver died on March 9, 2013, at the age of 71 in Seattle.
