= Washington Technology Industry Association =

The Washington Technology Industry Association (WTIA) (formerly Washington Software Alliance) is a prominent technology business association with approximately 1,000 member companies in Washington State, United States.

WTIA hosts educational and training events, CEO roundtables, executive seminars, and special interest Affinity Groups. It also engages in advocacy for technology interests in Olympia, WA, and Washington, DC.

The Washington Software Alliance (WSA) was renamed the Washington Technology Industry Association in 2008.
