= 2005 Seattle mayoral election =

- November 8, 2005
- Turnout: 51.36%
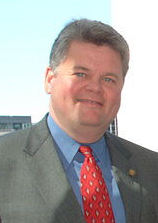

Candidate	Greg Nickels	Al Runte
Party	Nonpartisan	Nonpartisan
Popular vote	115,257	62,591
Percentage	64.15%	34.84%
Mayor before election
Greg Nickels
Elected mayor
Greg Nickels

The 2005 Seattle mayoral election took place November 8, 2005. Incumbent Mayor Greg Nickels was elected to a second term. As of 2025, this is the most recent Seattle mayoral election in which the incumbent was elected to a second term.

== Primary ==
The primary was held September 20, 2005.

Primary
Party	Candidate	Votes	%
Nonpartisan	Greg Nickels (incumbent)	54,449	57.17
Nonpartisan	Al Runte	20,949	21.99
Nonpartisan	Christal Olivia Wood	5,865	6.16
Nonpartisan	Jeanne E. Dixon	4,534	4.76
Nonpartisan	Richard Lee	3,788	3.98
Nonpartisan	Luke Williams	3,035	3.19
Nonpartisan	Chris Hoeppner	1,638	1.72
Write-in	Others	989	1.04
Turnout		95,27	27.31

== General election ==
The general election was held November 8.

General election
Party	Candidate	Votes	%
Nonpartisan	Greg Nickels (incumbent)	115,257	64.15
Nonpartisan	Al Runte	62,591	34.84
Write-in	Others	1,824	1.02
Turnout		179,672	51.36
