= Mike O'Brien (Seattle politician) =

American politician

Member of the Seattle City Council
- In office January 3, 2016 – January 3, 2020
- Preceded by: Nick Licata
- Succeeded by: Dan Strauss
- Constituency: District 6
- In office January 3, 2010 – January 3, 2016
- Preceded by: Richard McIver
- Succeeded by: Tim Burgess
- Constituency: Position 8

Personal details
- Born: March 2, 1968 (age 58) Seattle, Washington, U.S.
- Spouse: Julie O'Brien
- Children: 2
- Education: Duke University (BS); University of Washington (MBA)

Michael J. O'Brien (born March 2, 1968) is an American politician and former member of the Seattle City Council who represented District 6 in northwest Seattle. He was first elected in 2009 to a different, city-wide council seat. He was the leading proponent of the opt-out list for the Yellow Pages. He was the only opponent of the proposed deep bore tunnel under downtown Seattle on the city council. He was chair of the local chapter of the Sierra Club before running for office. In this capacity, he was one of the leading opponents of the 2007 Roads and Transit ballot measure.

== Early life and career ==
Mike O'Brien was born in Seattle and raised in the Eastside suburb of Clyde Hill. He holds a bachelor's degree in economics from Duke University and a M.B.A. in finance from the University of Washington, where he also earned a certificate in environmental management. O'Brien joined Seattle-based corporate law firm Stokes Lawrence as chief financial officer in 1998, where he met lawyer and neighborhood activist Mike McGinn, who would become O'Brien's friend and mentor.

== Political activism ==
O'Brien was invited by McGinn to the Seattle chapter of the Sierra Club as a volunteer treasurer, despite his previous lack of interest in politics. O'Brien became politically involved with the group and was elected as political chair of the Seattle chapter and chair of the Washington state chapter. During the 2007 election, O'Brien served as the group's spokesperson in the debate over the Roads and Transit proposition, which would have bundled Sound Transit projects with road expansion and was opposed by the Sierra Club. The ballot measure was defeated and a transit-only version, Sound Transit 2, was proposed for the following year with the support of the Sierra Club. Mike O'Brien was a representative of the Sierra Club on the Alaskan Way Viaduct Replacement Project Stakeholder Advisory Committee in 2008. During the 2008 campaign, O'Brien left Stokes Lawrence to be a full-time volunteer for the Sierra Club and was encouraged to run for office by McGinn and others in the environmental community. O'Brien is currently on the board of directors and is the treasurer of the Sierra Club.

== Political career ==
=== Position 8 ===
In February 2009, O'Brien announced his candidacy for a city council seat that incumbent councilmember Richard McIver planned to not run for. During the August primary for Position 8, O'Brien advanced with 35 percent of votes and was set to run against second-place finisher Robert Rosencrantz. O'Brien won the general election with 58 percent of votes and was sworn in on January 1, 2010, alongside newly elected mayor Mike McGinn.

=== District 6 ===
O'Brien ran for the newly created District 6 position for the Seattle City Council, primarily covering Ballard, Fremont and Green Lake. He won the primary and defeated Catherine Weatbrook in the November general election.

During his term as the District 6 councilmember, O'Brien attracted criticism for his positions on transportation, housing, homelessness, policing, and taxes.

At an after-party event following a gala for the Nordic Museum on May 5, 2018, O'Brien was reportedly asked to leave and subsequently forcibly removed by members of the Pacific Fishermen Shipyard (where the event was being held). O'Brien has attracted criticism from the group for his position on the extension of the Burke-Gilman Trail in Ballard.

Facing unfavorable polling results and opposition from groups like the Metropolitan Chamber of Commerce, in February 2019 O'Brien announced he would not seek reelection to the Seattle City Council.

== Other ventures ==
After his retirement from the city council, O'Brien and a former legislative aide founded their own HVAC company that focuses on installation of heat pumps to replace heating and cooling systems that use fossil fuels.

== Electoral history ==
=== 2009 election ===
Seattle City Council Position 8, Primary Election 2009
Party	Candidate	Votes	%
Nonpartisan	Mike O'Brien	42,619	34.48%
Nonpartisan	Robert Rosencrantz	25,602	20.71%
Nonpartisan	Jordan Royer	19,207	15.54%
Nonpartisan	Bobby Forch	15,444	12.49%
Nonpartisan	David Miller	14,644	11.85%
Nonpartisan	Rusty Williams	5,602	4.53%
Nonpartisan	Write-in	488	0.39%
Turnout		146,568	38.60%
Registered electors		379,721	

Seattle City Council Position 8, General Election 2009
Party	Candidate	Votes	%
Nonpartisan	Mike O'Brien	103,435	57.76%
Nonpartisan	Robert Rosencrantz	75,157	41.97%
Nonpartisan	Write-in	484	0.27%
Majority		28,278	15.79%
Turnout		216,573	57.73%
Registered electors		375,164	

=== 2013 election ===
Seattle City Council Position 8, Primary Election 2013
Party	Candidate	Votes	%
Nonpartisan	Mike O'Brien	74,372	58.88%
Nonpartisan	Albert Shen	43,053	34.08%
Nonpartisan	David Ishii	8,137	6.44%
Nonpartisan	Write-in	753	0.60%
Turnout		144,306	34.95%
Registered electors		412,847	

Seattle City Council Position 8, General Election 2013
Party	Candidate	Votes	%
Nonpartisan	Mike O'Brien	117,011	66.84%
Nonpartisan	Albert Shen	57,434	32.81%
Nonpartisan	Write-in	607	0.35%
Majority		59,577	34.03%
Turnout		215,550	52.50%
Registered electors		410,572	

=== 2015 election ===
Seattle City Council District 6, Primary Election 2015
Party	Candidate	Votes	%
Nonpartisan	Mike O'Brien	12,403	59.08%
Nonpartisan	Catherine Weatbrook	4,680	22.29%
Nonpartisan	Jon Lisbin	2,751	13.10%
Nonpartisan	Stan Shaufler	1,107	5.27%
Nonpartisan	Write-in	53	0.25%
Turnout		21,451	31.74%
Registered electors		67,591	

Seattle City Council District 6, General Election 2015
Party	Candidate	Votes	%
Nonpartisan	Mike O'Brien	18,830	61.29%
Nonpartisan	Catherine Weatbrook	11,802	38.41%
Nonpartisan	Write-in	91	0.30%
Majority		7,028	22.88%
Turnout		33,741	49.42%
Registered electors		68,273	
