= Peter Steinbrueck =

American politician (born 1957)

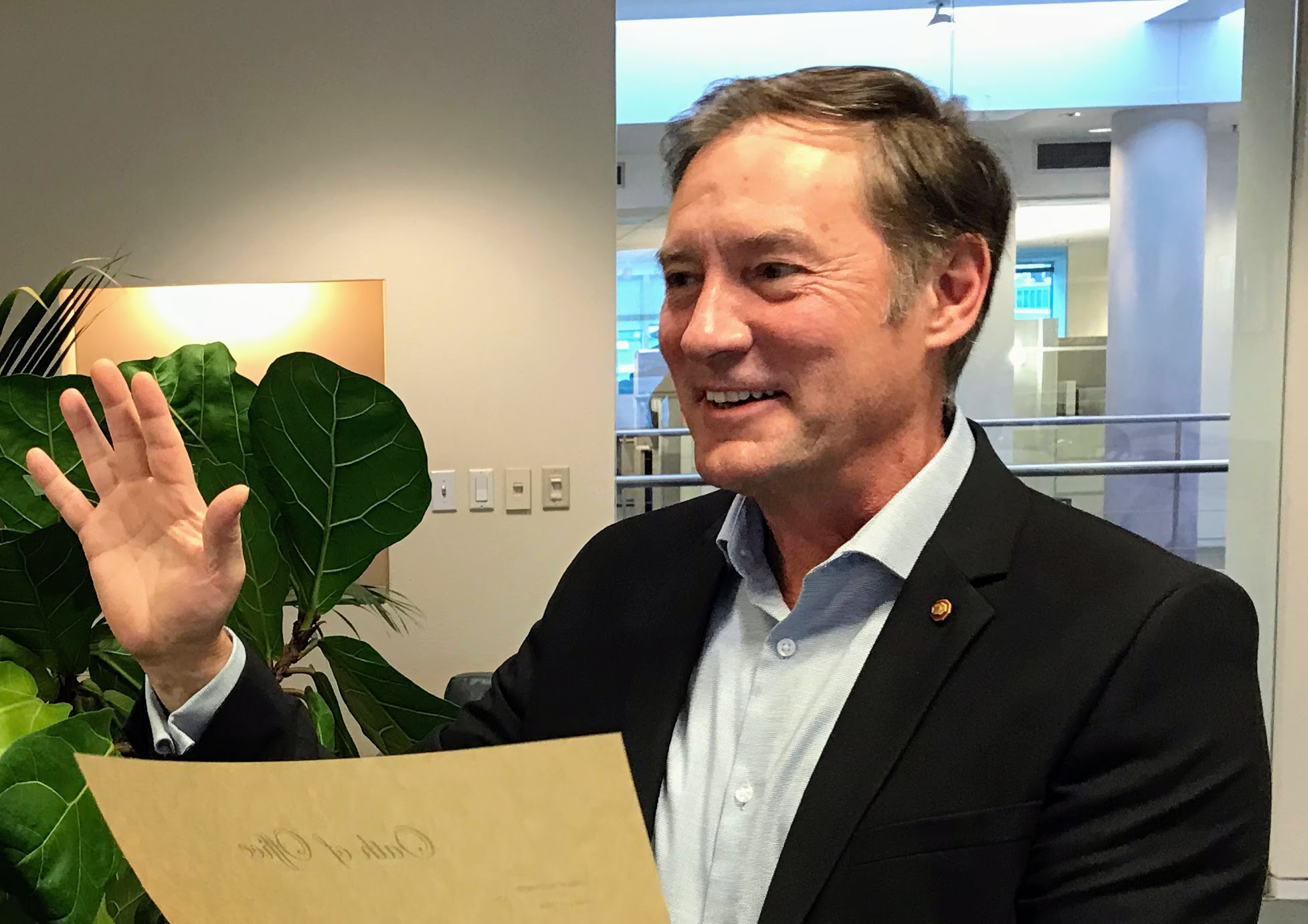
- Peter Steinbrueck, 2017

Member of the Seattle Port Commission Position 4
- In office January 1, 2018 – January 1, 2022
- Preceded by: Tom Albro
- Succeeded by: Toshiko Grace Hasegawa

President of the Seattle City Council
- In office January 3, 2002 – January 3, 2004
- Preceded by: Margaret Pageler
- Succeeded by: Jan Drago

Member of the Seattle City Council, Position 3
- In office November 4, 1997 – January 1, 2008
- Preceded by: Richard McIver
- Succeeded by: Bruce Harrell

Personal details
- Born: October 14, 1957 (age 68) Seattle, Washington, U.S.
- Party: Democratic Party formerly affiliated with the Green Party
- Relations: Victor Steinbrueck (father)
- Children: 2
- Education: Lakeside School
- Alma mater: Bowdoin College (BA); University of Washington (MArch)
- Occupation: Architect, politician

Peter Steinbrueck (born October 14, 1957) is an American architect and politician from Seattle, Washington. He is the principal and founder of Steinbrueck Urban Strategies and was a member of the Seattle City Council from 1997 to 2008. He also was a Seattle Port Commissioner from 2018 to 2022.

== Early life and education ==
Steinbrueck was born and raised in Seattle and is the son of noted architect Victor Steinbrueck (1911–1985) and artist Elaine Pearl Worden. His parents divorced when he was young and he would live with his mother but spend time with his dad at protests to save Pike Place Market. He graduated from Lakeside School, received his bachelor of arts degree in government from Bowdoin College, and a master of architecture degree from the University of Washington College of Built Environments.

In the 1980s and '90s, Steinbrueck was a civil activist as a leading advocate and author of the Citizens Alternative Plan, focusing on limiting downtown building heights. The CAP campaign was partially fueled by the failure to preserve Westlake Park as open space, which was supported by his father Victor before he died in 1984.The CAP initiative came to the city for a vote and passed with 62% support, but the council put some restrictions on the initiative to protect it from court challenges.

== Political career ==
=== Seattle city council ===
Steinbrueck was a Seattle City Council member, first elected to the council on November 4, 1997, and immediately sworn in to fill the unfinished term of John Manning. He ran for re-election in 1999 and 2003 winning both elections with 80% of the vote. He served as chair of the Housing and Human Services Committee in his first four years on the council, later the Parks, Education, and Libraries Committee, and in his final four years, he chaired the Urban Development and Planning Committee, served as council president from 2002 to 2003.

Over his tenure, Steinbrueck led legislation that focused on early education, the environment, homeless services, housing, and historic preservation. On the environment, he developed legislation creating the nation's first law requiring a LEED Silver rating for public buildings and separate legislation protecting the Cedar River watershed. He also used his experience as an architect in the design and development of public buildings, such as Seattle City Hall and the Seattle Central Library. He also passed legislation that restored funding for homelessness services, funded creation of low-income housing, and double fees on downtown developers for an affordable housing fund.

In 2007, Steinbrueck announced that he would not seek reelection.

=== Mayoral election ===
In late 2012, Steinbrueck announced his candidacy for Mayor of Seattle in the 2013 election. He focused his campaign on public safety, with more police in parks with high crime and other police reform, and on infrastructure and urban planning. In the August primary election, Steinbrueck came in third with 16% of the vote and did not advance to the general election.

=== Port of Seattle commissioner ===
On November 7, 2017, Steinbrueck was elected as Seattle Port Commissioner, Position 4.

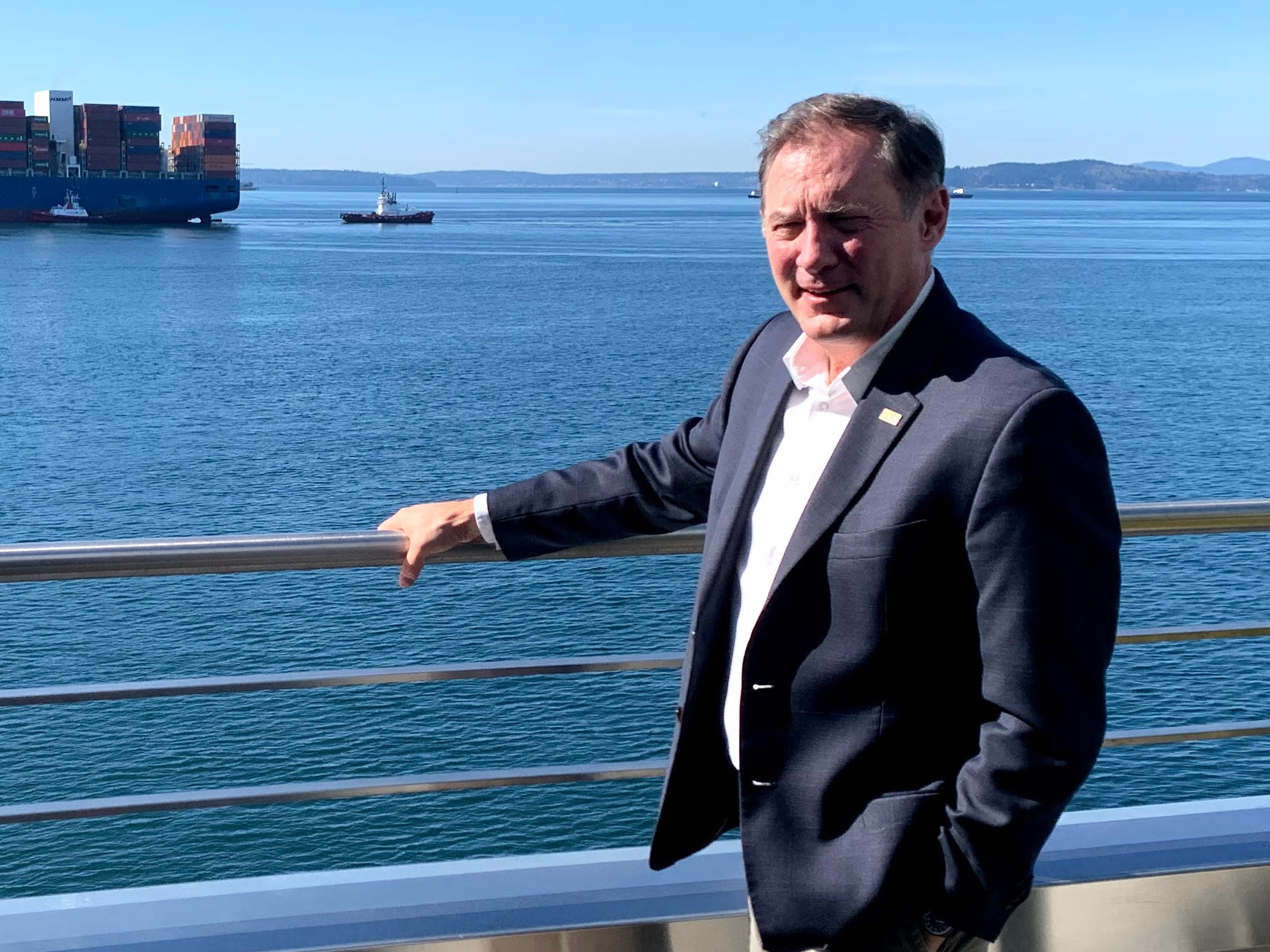
Peter Steinbrueck Port of Seattle Commission Pier 69

Steinbrueck served one term on the Port of Seattle Commission beginning in 2018, where he is credited with creating the Port's $20 million South King County Community Fund. Steinbrueck authored a motion passed by the full Commission developing a task force on Policing and Civil Rights that examined Port Police hiring, training, promotions, and the use of force. Steinbrueck was President of the Commission during the Port's response to the COVID-19 pandemic and successfully lead the organization to financial stability without staff layoffs as Port revenues reduced dramatically with flight cancelations and the cancelation of the cruise season.

In 2021, Steinbrueck ran for reelection and lost to Toshiko Grace Hasegawa, the executive director of the Washington State Commission on Asian-Pacific American Affairs, 45% to 54%.

== Urbanist activities ==
In 2007, after leaving his City Council position, Steinbrueck founded his firm, Steinbrueck Urban Strategies, an urban planning, urban sustainability, and urban design consulting practice. He has been a visiting instructor at the University of Washington’s College of the Built Environments and is a frequent speaker, commentator, and writer on the emerging framework for advancing the environmental sustainability of cities and regions. In 2009, Steinbrueck was named a Loeb Fellow in the Graduate School of Design at Harvard University, where he completed the academic year 2009-10 of independent research focused on the environment, climate change, and urban sustainability in the United States. Steinbrueck is a Harvard Center for the Environment's Working Group for Sustainable Cities member.

== Awards and recognition ==
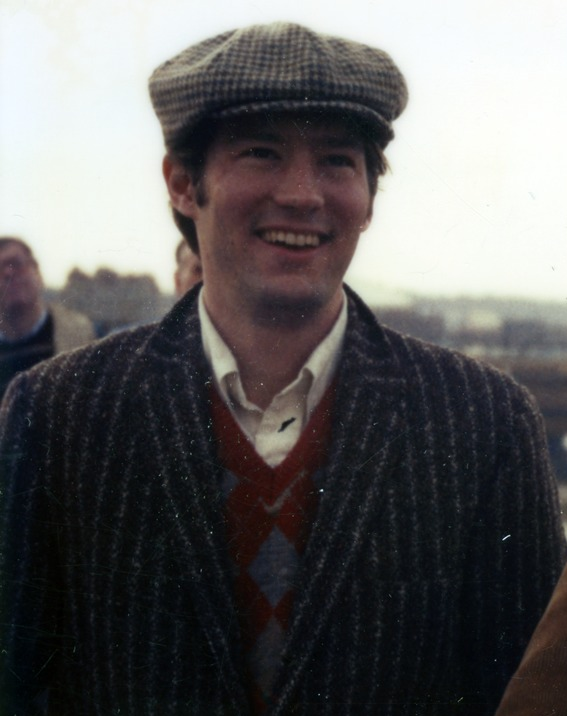
Steinbrueck at Seattle's Market Park in 1984

The American Institute of Architects (AIA) recognized Steinbrueck with its Young Architects Award in 1999 for his public and civic contributions affecting affordable housing, homelessness, civic design, historic preservation, and the environment. In 2006, the AIA elevated him to membership in its College of Fellows for his achievements in public office and contributions to the profession and society. In 2002, Steinbrueck received the Public Sector Achievement Award from the National Alliance to End Homelessness for his commitment to reducing and preventing homelessness through systematic change. In 2012, Steinbrueck received the U.S. Federal Executives Board's Outstanding Public Service Award.

Other local, state, and national organizations that have honored him include th Seattle Human Services Coalition (Stewardship Award, 2006), Seattle magazine's Most Influential People (2006), and the Washington State Office of Archaeology and Historic Preservation (Outstanding Career Achievement in Historic Preservation, 2008).
