= Samis (disambiguation) =

Samis are the traditionally Sámi-speaking indigenous people inhabiting the region of Sápmi.

Samis may also refer to:

== Businesses and organisations ==
- Samis Foundation, founded by American real estate investor and landlord Sam Israel
- Samis Land Company, founded by American real estate investor and landlord Sam Israel

== People with the surname ==
- George Samis (born 1943), Canadian politician
- Phil Samis (1927–2022), Canadian ice hockey player
- Rich Samis, American drummer

== See also ==
- Šamiš, the Mandaic name for the Sun
- Sami (disambiguation)
