= Charles L. Smith =

Charles L. Smith may refer to:

- Charles L. Smith (Canadian politician) (1853–?), Canadian politician in New Brunswick
- Charles L. Smith (Seattle politician) (1892–1982), mayor of Seattle, Washington
- Charles Lynwood Smith Jr. (born 1943), U.S. federal judge
- Charles Lee Smith (1887–1964), American atheist activist
- Charles Loraine Smith (1751–1835), sportsman, artist and politician
