= Thomas Humes =

Thomas Humes may refer to:

- Thomas J. Humes (1849–1904), mayor of Seattle
- Thomas William Humes (1815–1892), American clergyman and educator
