= James Scavotto =

American politician

38th Mayor of Seattle
- In office April 13, 1938 – April 27, 1938
- Preceded by: John F. Dore
- Succeeded by: Arthur B. Langlie

Personal details
- Born: James Scavotto; 1891 (Date Uncertain) St. Louis, Missouri
- Died: February 24, 1950 (aged 59) Seattle, Washington

James Scavotto (1891 – February 24, 1950) was an American politician who served six terms on the Seattle City Council and one very brief term as Mayor of Seattle, replacing John F. Dore who resigned due to rapidly failing health.

== On Council ==
First elected to council under the banner of reform, Scavotto backed several initiatives as a councilmember, including a $3 minimum wage, mandatory meat inspections, an end to "secret" Council meetings, and expansion of streetcar lines.

His first term in particular also included being involved in a fistfight at City Hall, as well as an incident wherein an unidentified "youth" fired eight pistol rounds into his automobile.

== As Mayor ==
During his brief term as mayor, he was convinced by Association of Washington Cities representative and later first head of the Seattle Housing Authority Jesse Epstein to establish a "civic committee to make plans for a federal-aid housing program."

== Personal life ==
Orphaned at age seven, Scavotto spent his next four years in an orphanage, attending school only through the eighth grade. His relocation to Seattle was prompted by a visit to see his brother-in law; his first place of employment in the city was at the Pike Place Market.

Upon his death, the Seattle City Council passed a resolution declaring his loss "a loss to the entire city" and praising his years of service.

James Scavotto was survived by his wife Rose, their two sons, and their grandchildren.
