= Collins Building (Seattle) =

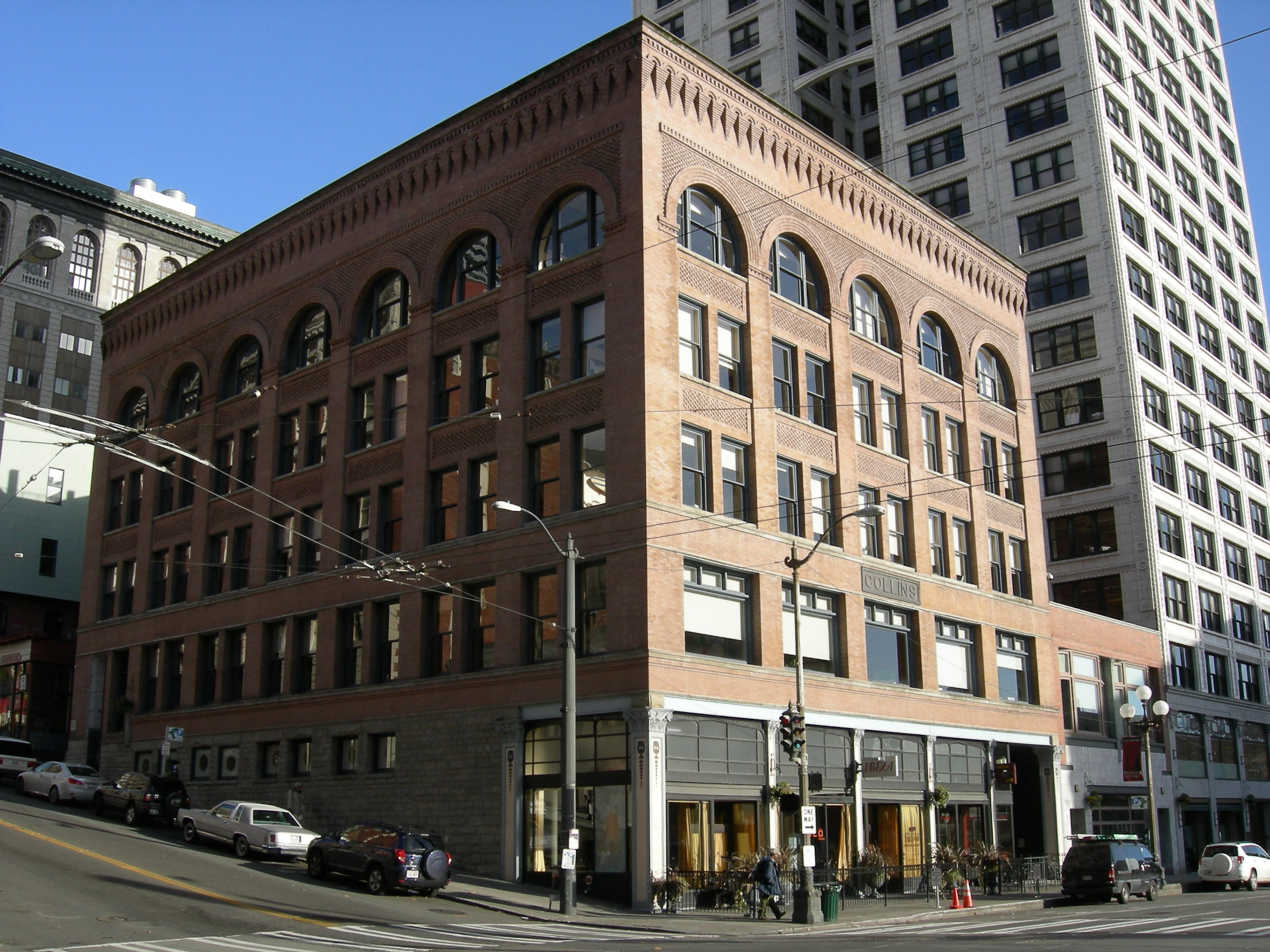
- Collins Block, 2007

- Location within Downtown Seattle

General information
- Architectural style: Richardsonian Romanesque
- Coordinates: 47.6023°N 122.3321°W
- Named for: John Collins
- Owner: Samis Foundation

The Collins Building or Collins Block is a brick building in Seattle, Washington, USA, constructed between 1893 and 1894 by John Collins.

Designed in the Richardsonian Romanesque style by Arthur Bishop Chamberlin, the five-story Collins Building is built on a hilly slope at the corner of Second Avenue and James Street. It is sited on land once occupied by John Collins' personal residence, which was destroyed in the Great Seattle Fire.

As of 2016, the building was owned by the Samis Foundation.
