= John F. Dore =

American politician (1881–1938)

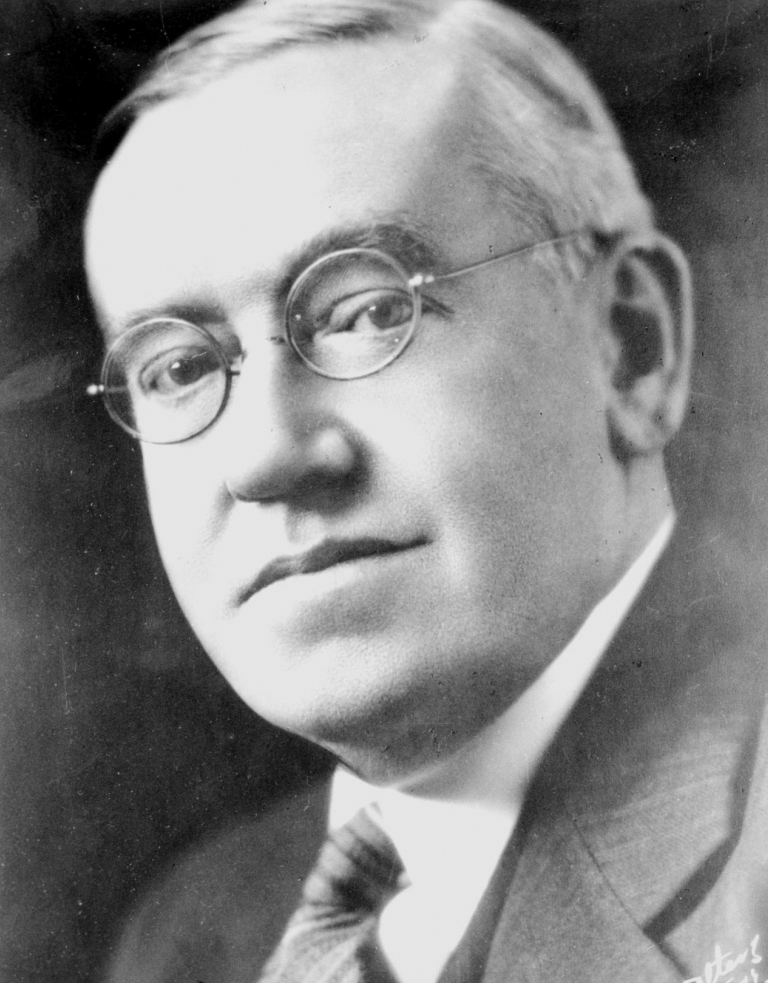

37th Mayor of Seattle
- In office June 1, 1936 – April 13, 1938
- Preceded by: Charles L. Smith
- Succeeded by: James Scavotto
- In office June 4, 1932 – June 4, 1934
- Preceded by: Robert H. Harlin
- Succeeded by: Charles L. Smith

Personal details
- Born: John Francis Dore; December 11, 1881 Boston, Massachusetts, U.S.
- Died: April 18, 1938 (aged 56) Seattle, Washington, U.S.
- Party: Democratic

John Francis Dore (December 11, 1881 – April 18, 1938) was an American politician who served as the Mayor of Seattle from 1932 to 1934 and again from 1936 to 1938.

== First term ==
Dore ran for his first term on a platform of relief for the unemployed and balancing the city budget through budget cuts. While his first term began with strong support from labour, he fell out of favour after his attempts to work with other Puget Sound mayors to demand help from the state and Governor Roland Hartley with relief efforts failed. He also angered labour by opposing the Unemployed Citizens' League's march on the state capital of Olympia through Seattle.

== Limited role in the 1934 Waterfront Strike ==
The 1934 West Coast waterfront strike began on May 9, 1934, late in Mayor Dore's first term. Longshoremen in all ports of the West Coast walked out, and in Seattle, the Masters, Mates, and Pilots Union refused to handle cargoes as the shipping companies began recruiting University of Washington students as strikebreakers. On May 13, two thousand strikers from Everett and Tacoma arrived to shore up the Seattle picket lines. This, combined with Mayor Dore's refusal to ask Governor Clarence D. Martin to call in the National Guard, effectively ended this strikebreaking effort. By May 15, off-shore unions also joined the strike, and the Teamsters ceased crossing the picket lines.

== Second Term ==
Returning to office after Mayor Charles L. Smith's only term, Dore became a stronger proponent of organized labor. In contrast to Mayor Smith, he kept police away from picket lines, particularly those of the American Newspaper Guild when they struck first the Seattle Post-Intelligencer, then the Seattle Times and the Seattle Star.

Dore was an active member of the Washington Commonwealth Federation, speaking at its 1936 convention.

During inter-labour conflict between the American Federation of Labor and the Congress of Industrial Organizations, Dore sided with Dave Beck and the AFL over the rival CIO.

Mayor Beck's other notable effort was defeating a proposition to refinance and rebuild Seattle's streetcar system in line with the wishes of the Transit Worker's Union. Opposing a "trackless trolley" (overhead-wire electric) network, Dore favoured gasoline-powered busses as a replacement.
