= Byron Phelps =

American politician (1842–1934)

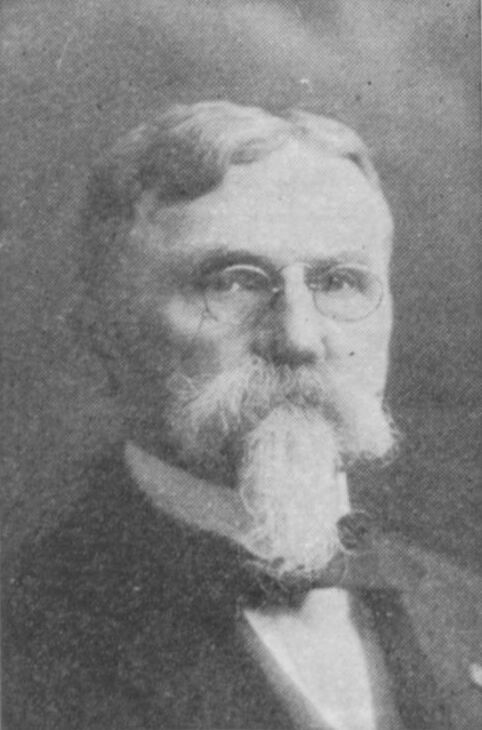

20th Mayor of Seattle
- In office March 19, 1894 – March 16, 1896
- Preceded by: James T. Ronald
- Succeeded by: Frank D. Black

Personal details
- Born: March 4, 1842; Forrest, Illinois
- Died: March 3, 1934 (aged 91); Seattle, Washington
- Political party: Republican

Byron Phelps (March 4, 1842 – March 3, 1934) was an American politician who served as the Mayor of Seattle from 1894 to 1896.

He served in the 3rd Illinois Cavalry during the Civil War, becoming regimental adjutant. In Seattle was served as County Treasurer from 1890 until he became Mayor. After his term as Mayor he served two terms as County Auditor, starting in 1912. He was an inventor and held more than fifty patents.

He was made commander of the Grand Army of the Republic for Washington State and Alaska in 1927.

== Sources ==
- "Ex-Mayor Phelps of Seattle Dies, 92". The New York Times. March 4, 1934. p. 30.
