= Gordon S. Clinton =

American politician (1920–2011)

Gordon Stanley Clinton
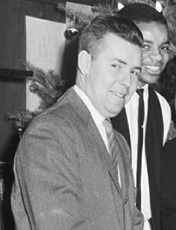
- Gordon Clinton, c. 1961

44th Mayor of Seattle
- In office June 4, 1956 – April 6, 1964
- Preceded by: Allan Pomeroy
- Succeeded by: James d'Orma Braman

35th President of the National League of Cities
- In office January 1962 – August 1962
- Preceded by: Richardson Dilworth
- Succeeded by: Lewis Wesley Cutrer

Personal details
- Born: April 13, 1920 Medicine Hat, Alberta, Canada
- Died: November 19, 2011 (aged 91)
- Party: Republican

Documentary clip featuring Gordon

Gordon Stanley Clinton (April 13, 1920 – November 19, 2011) was the 44th mayor of Seattle. After defeating incumbent Mayor Allen Pomeroy in a close election in 1956, Clinton served two terms, from 1956 to 1964. Upon taking office, Clinton established the Metropolitan Problems Advisory Committee, headed by local community leader John Ellis, to suggest approaches to dealing with chronic local and regional problems. During his administration, Clinton tackled issues as divergent as regional governance, international trade, and discrimination in housing. He was a Republican.

Clinton actively supported development of enabling legislation used by the Washington State Legislature to allow creation of regional governments, leading to the formation of the Municipality of Metropolitan Seattle (Metro) in 1958. Clinton also established Seattle's first sister city relationship (with Kobe, Japan) in 1956, supported the development of the current Seattle Center site for the World's Fair in 1962, and attempted to fight illegal gambling in Seattle. In 1963, Clinton created the 12-member Seattle Human Rights Commission to promote equality and understanding among Seattle residents.

Preceded by Allan Pomeroy	Mayor of Seattle; 1956–1964	Succeeded by James d'Orma Braman
