= John T. Jordan =

American politician

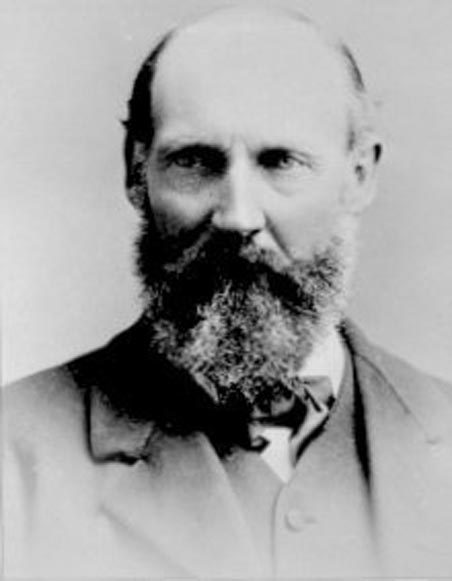

2nd Mayor of Seattle
- In office April 5, 1873 – June 5, 1873
- Preceded by: Corliss P. Stone
- Succeeded by: Moses R. Maddocks
- In office July 31, 1871 – July 29, 1872
- Preceded by: Henry A. Atkins
- Succeeded by: Corliss P. Stone

Personal details
- Born: January 1, 1832 Raymond, Maine, U.S.
- Died: March 3, 1886 (aged 54) Seattle, Washington, U.S.
- Party: Independent
- Spouse: Amanda Livingston Jordan

John Tenny Jordan (January 1, 1832 – March 3, 1886) was an American politician who served as the Mayor of Seattle from 1871 to 1872 and again in 1873. Jordan arrived in Seattle around 1860 to work as a stonemason and plasterer, playing a key role in building the first campus of the University of Washington in modern Downtown Seattle. He was elected as the city's first police marshal in 1869 and served on the common council in 1870.

After his two stints as mayor, Jordan served as the grand chancellor of the Washington Territory grand lodge of the Knights of Pythias. He was also a grand master of the Seattle Freemasons lodge and a regent of the University of Washington. Jordan died of a heart attack on March 3, 1886.
