= Moses R. Maddocks =

American politician

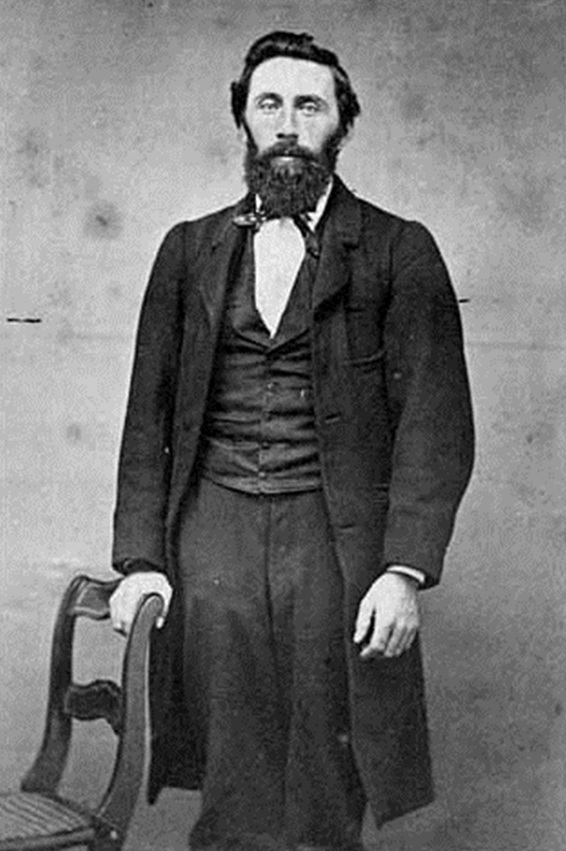

4th Mayor of Seattle
- In office June 5, 1873 – August 3, 1873
- Preceded by: John T. Jordan
- Succeeded by: John Collins

Personal details
- Born: November 13, 1833 Bucksport, Maine, U.S.
- Died: February 25, 1919 (aged 85) Seattle, Washington, U.S.
- Party: Republican

Moses R. Maddocks (November 13, 1833 – February 25, 1919) was an American politician who served as the Mayor of Seattle in 1873.
