= Bertrand Collins =

Edward Bertrand Collins
- Born: March 15, 1893; Seattle, Washington, U.S.
- Died: December 16, 1964 (aged 71)
- Education: Harvard University
- Occupation: author
- Parents: John Collins (father); Angela Burdett-Coutts Jackling (mother)

Edward Bertrand Collins (March 15, 1893 – December 16, 1964), commonly known as Bertrand Collins, was an American writer from Seattle, Washington.

Collins was born in Seattle to John Collins and his much younger wife, Angela Burdett-Coutts. Jackling, whose family founded the lumber mills at Utsalady on Camano Island, WA in 1859. As a child, he was playmates with the lumber heiress Dorothy Stimson Bullitt, who grew up near to the Collins' home. His father died in 1903 and, ten years later, the young Collins received a disbursement of $834,000 from his father's estate. (Note: An amount equivalent to about $20 million in 2015.)

Collins graduated from Harvard University in 1914 and, in 1917 was commissioned an ensign in the United States Navy, serving at the navy's European headquarters in London before taking a shipboard posting on USS Housatonic. In the 1920s he traveled extensively in Europe. A profile of Collins published in a 1930 issue of the Brooklyn Daily Eagle described him as "swarthy" and "good-looking" with "Celtic blue eyes and a ... slight British accent".

Collins often played on his privileged upbringing to engage in witty commentary that was "extremely audacious in a well bred manner". In 1934, after driving back to Seattle from New York City, he declared in a newspaper interview that the United States was "too big", remarking that "New England is about right ... and the Pacific Coast would make a nice, other Italy" but that he didn't see any use for the rest of the country, implying the Midwest.

Collins' 1928 novel Rome Express is based on the life of his contemporary, and fellow wealthy Seattle cosmopolitan, Guendolen Plestcheeff.

== Bibliography ==
- Rome Express (1928)
- The Silver Swan (1930)
- Moon in the West (1933)
