= Mayor of Seattle =

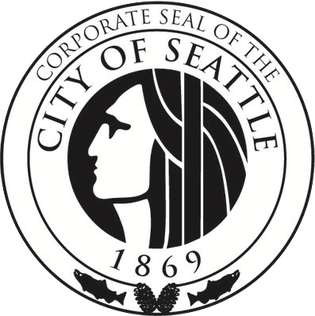

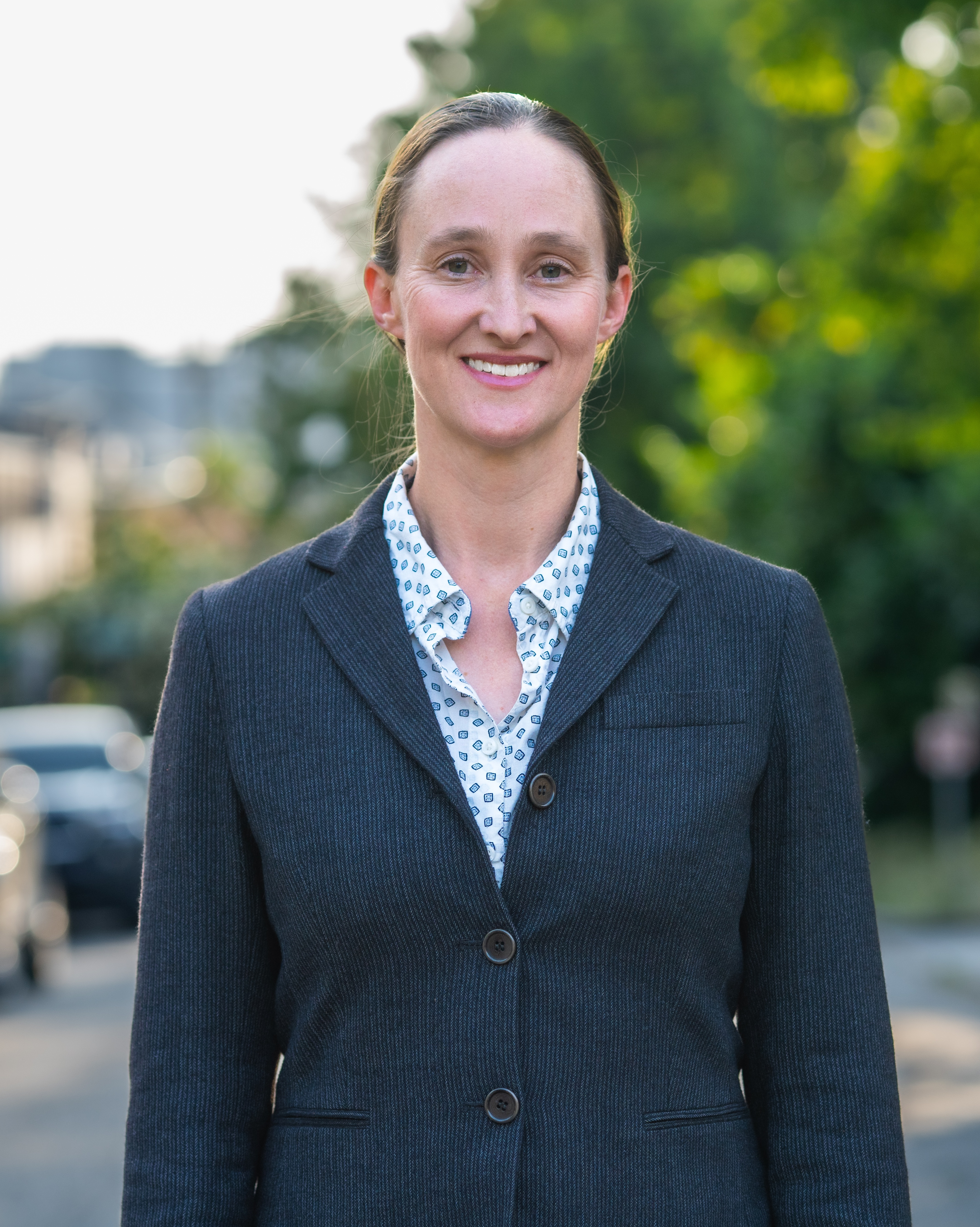
- Incumbent; Katie Wilson since January 1, 2026
- Government of Seattle
- Style: The Honorable
- Term length: 4 years
- Inaugural holder: Henry A. Atkins
- Formation: December 2, 1869
- Salary: $230,000
- Website: Official website

The mayor of Seattle is the head of the executive branch of the city government of Seattle, Washington. The mayor is authorized by the city charter to enforce laws enacted by the Seattle City Council, as well as direct subordinate officers in city departments. (The Seattle City Council, the legislative branch of city government, is led by the council president.)

The mayor serves a four-year term, without term limits, and is chosen in citywide, two-round elections between nonpartisan candidates.

Since the appointment of Henry A. Atkins in 1869, 56 individuals have held the office of mayor. The city elected Bertha Knight Landes, the first female mayor of a major U.S. city, in 1926. Several mayors have served non-consecutive terms, while others have resigned or faced recall elections. Charles Royer holds the record for longest mayoral tenure in the city's history, serving three full terms from 1978 to 1990.

Incumbent mayor Katie Wilson took office on January 1, 2026, after defeating incumbent Bruce Harrell in the 2025 Seattle mayoral election. She was ceremonially sworn in on January 2.

== History ==
Seattle was initially incorporated as a town on January 14, 1865, by the Washington Territorial Legislature, governed by a board of trustees. Charles C. Terry served as president of the board of trustees, which remained unchanged until the town's disincorporation on January 28, 1867. The town of Seattle was incorporated a second time on December 2, 1869, with a new city charter that established the position of mayor. Henry A. Atkins was appointed the first mayor of Seattle by the Territorial Legislature, and was elected to the office on July 11, 1870.

A new city charter, the Freeholders Charter, was adopted in 1890 and extended the mayor's term in office from one year to two years, but barred consecutive terms. The charter also moved elections to the first Monday in March and required the mayor to be at least 30 years of age and live within the city for two years.

A new city charter that was approved by the city's voters in 1946 lengthened the term of office for mayors from two years to four years, starting with the 1948 elections. In 1969 the age and residence requirements were removed from the charter.

== Duties and powers ==
The mayor is the head of the executive branch of Seattle's municipal government, charged with the appointment and management of 25 department and commission heads that work directly for the mayor. In the event of an absence of the mayor, the president of the Seattle City Council assumes the duties of the position as mayor pro tem until their return, but a notification is not necessary under the city charter.

== Elections and succession ==
The mayor is elected in a citywide election held every four years, composed of two stages: a primary election in August and a general election between the top two candidates in November. Elections are officially non-partisan.

If the office of mayor becomes vacant, the president of the city council becomes mayor for a five-day period to immediately fill the position. If the president of the city council declines to remain mayor, the city council is authorized to vote to appoint a councilmember to the role of mayor. The councilmember appointed to the position under both scenarios will forfeit their position on the city council until the next election. A mayor-elect can also take office earlier than the official inauguration date (January 1), upon certification of the election results and a decision by the city council to replace the appointed mayor.

A two-thirds majority vote of the city council can remove the mayor from office for a willful violation of duty or an offense involving moral turpitude.

== List of mayors ==
#	Photo	Mayor	Took office	Left office	Election results and notes
1		Henry A. Atkins	December 2, 1869	July 31, 1871	Appointed on December 2, 1869. Elected July 11, 1870.
2		John T. Jordan	July 31, 1871	July 29, 1872	Elected July 10, 1871.
3		Corliss P. Stone	July 29, 1872	February 23, 1873	Elected July 8, 1872. Left office on February 23, 1873, due to alleged embezzlement of funds.
		John T. Jordan	April 5, 1873	June 5, 1873	Appointed to fill position until special election.
4		Moses R. Maddocks	June 5, 1873	August 3, 1873	Won special election on June 5, 1873, to serve the rest of Stone's regular term.
5		John Collins	August 3, 1873	August 2, 1874	Elected on July 14, 1873.
6		Henry Yesler	August 2, 1874	August 2, 1875	Elected July 13, 1874.
7		Bailey Gatzert	August 2, 1875	July 31, 1876	Elected August 2, 1875.
8		Gideon A. Weed	July 31, 1876	July 29, 1878	Elected July 10, 1876, and re-elected July 9, 1877.
9		Beriah Brown	July 29, 1878	August 3, 1879	Elected July 8, 1878.
10		Orange Jacobs	August 3, 1879	August 2, 1880	Elected July 14, 1879.
11		Leonard P. Smith	August 2, 1880	July 31, 1882	Elected July 12, 1880.
12		Henry G. Struve	July 31, 1882	August 3, 1884	Elected July 10, 1882, and re-elected on July 9, 1883.
13		John Leary	August 3, 1884	August 3, 1885	Elected July 14, 1884.
		Henry Yesler	August 3, 1885	August 2, 1886	Elected July 13, 1885, to a non-consecutive second term.
14		William H. Shoudy	August 2, 1886	August 1, 1887	Elected July 12, 1886.
15		Thomas T. Minor	August 1, 1887	July 30, 1888	Elected July 11, 1887.
16		Robert Moran	July 30, 1888	August 3, 1890	Elected July 9, 1888, and re-elected July 8, 1889.
17		Harry White	August 3, 1890	December 9, 1891	Elected July 14, 1890, to an abbreviated term under 1890 charter. Resigned on November 30, 1891.
18		George W. Hall	December 9, 1891	March 31, 1892	Appointed.
19		James T. Ronald	March 31, 1892	March 19, 1894	Elected March 8, 1892.
20		Byron Phelps	March 19, 1894	March 16, 1896	Elected March 12, 1894.
21		Frank D. Black	March 16, 1896	April 6, 1896	Elected March 9, 1896. Resigned after three weeks in office.
22		W. D. Wood	April 6, 1896	October 18, 1897	Appointed to fill unexpired term. Resigned in July 1897 to participate in the Klondike Gold Rush. Officially forfeited his seat on October 18,1897.
23		Thomas J. Humes	November 19, 1897	March 21, 1904	Elected by City Council to fill unexpired term.
24		Richard A. Ballinger	March 21, 1904	March 19, 1906	Elected March 8, 1904.
25		William Hickman Moore	March 19, 1906	March 16, 1908	Elected March 6, 1906.
26		John Miller	March 16, 1908	March 21, 1910	Elected March 3, 1908.
27		Hiram C. Gill	March 21, 1910	February 11, 1911	Elected March 8, 1910. Recalled in special election held February 9, 1911.
28		George W. Dilling	February 11, 1911	March 18, 1912	Elected February 7, 1911.
29		George F. Cotterill	March 18, 1912	March 16, 1914	Elected March 5, 1912.
		Hiram C. Gill	March 16, 1914	March 18, 1918	Elected March 3, 1914.
30		Ole Hanson	March 18, 1918	August 28, 1919	Elected March 5, 1918. Resigned August 28, 1919, to move to California.
31		C. B. Fitzgerald	August 28, 1919	March 14, 1920	Appointed to fill unexpired term.
32		Hugh M. Caldwell	March 14, 1920	June 5, 1922	Elected March 2, 1920.
33		Edwin J. Brown	June 5, 1922	June 7, 1926	Elected May 2, 1922, and re-elected March 4, 1924.
34		Bertha Knight Landes	June 7, 1926	June 4, 1928	Elected March 9, 1926. First female mayor.
35		Frank E. Edwards	June 4, 1928	July 14, 1931	Elected March 6, 1928, and re-elected March 4, 1930. Recalled in special election held July 13, 1931.
36		Robert H. Harlin	July 14, 1931	June 4, 1932	Appointed to finish unexpired term.
37		John F. Dore	June 4, 1932	June 4, 1934	Elected March 8, 1932.
38		Charles L. Smith	June 4, 1934	June 1, 1936	Elected March 6, 1934.
		John F. Dore	June 1, 1936	April 13, 1938	Elected March 3, 1936. Relieved of office on April 13, 1938, due to sickness. Died on April 18, 1938.
		James Scavotto	April 13, 1938	April 27, 1938	Appointed to fill position until city council decision.
39		Arthur B. Langlie	April 27, 1938	January 11, 1941	Elected March 8, 1938. Appointed as mayor-elect due to relieving (and death) of Mayor Dore. Re-elected May 5, 1940. Resigned January 11, 1941, to become Governor of Washington.
40		John E. Carroll	January 27, 1941	March 27, 1941	Appointed until special election.
41		Earl Millikin	March 27, 1941	June 1, 1942	Elected March 4, 1941, to finish unexpired term.
42		William F. Devin	June 1, 1942	June 1, 1952	Elected March 3, 1942. Re-elected on March 7, 1944, March 5, 1946, and March 2, 1948.
43		Allan Pomeroy	June 1, 1952	June 4, 1956	Elected March 4, 1952.
44		Gordon Clinton	June 4, 1956	April 6, 1964	Elected March 6, 1956, and re-elected March 8, 1960.
45		James d'Orma Braman	April 6, 1964	March 23, 1969	Elected March 10, 1964. Resigned to accept appointment as Assistant Secretary of Urban Systems and Environment in the U.S. Department of Transportation.
46		Floyd C. Miller	March 23, 1969	December 1, 1969	
47		Wesley C. Uhlman	December 1, 1969	January 1, 1978	Elected November 4, 1969, and re-elected November 6, 1973. Survived recall attempt on July 1, 1975.
48		Charles Royer	January 1, 1978	January 1, 1990	Elected November 8, 1977. Re-elected on November 3, 1981, and November 5, 1985.
49		Norm Rice	January 1, 1990	January 1, 1998	Elected November 7, 1989, and re-elected November 2, 1993. First African-American mayor.
50		Paul Schell	January 1, 1998	January 1, 2002	Elected November 4, 1997.
51		Greg Nickels	January 1, 2002	January 1, 2010	Elected November 6, 2001, and re-elected November 8, 2005.
52		Michael McGinn	January 1, 2010	January 1, 2014	Elected November 3, 2009.
53		Ed Murray	January 1, 2014	September 13, 2017	Elected November 5, 2013. Resigned due to sexual abuse allegations. First gay mayor.
54		Bruce Harrell	September 13, 2017	September 18, 2017	Appointed through position as City Council President to finish unexpired term, declined to accept appointment and therefore a replacement was selected by City Council. First Asian-American mayor and second African-American mayor.
55		Tim Burgess	September 18, 2017	November 28, 2017	Appointed by Seattle City Council to finish unexpired term.
56		Jenny Durkan	November 28, 2017	January 1, 2022	Elected November 7, 2017.
57		Bruce Harrell	January 1, 2022	January 1, 2026	Elected November 2, 2021.
58		Katie Wilson	January 1, 2026	Incumbent	Elected November 4, 2025.
