= Osceola Mudflow =

Volcanic mudflow in Washington, USA

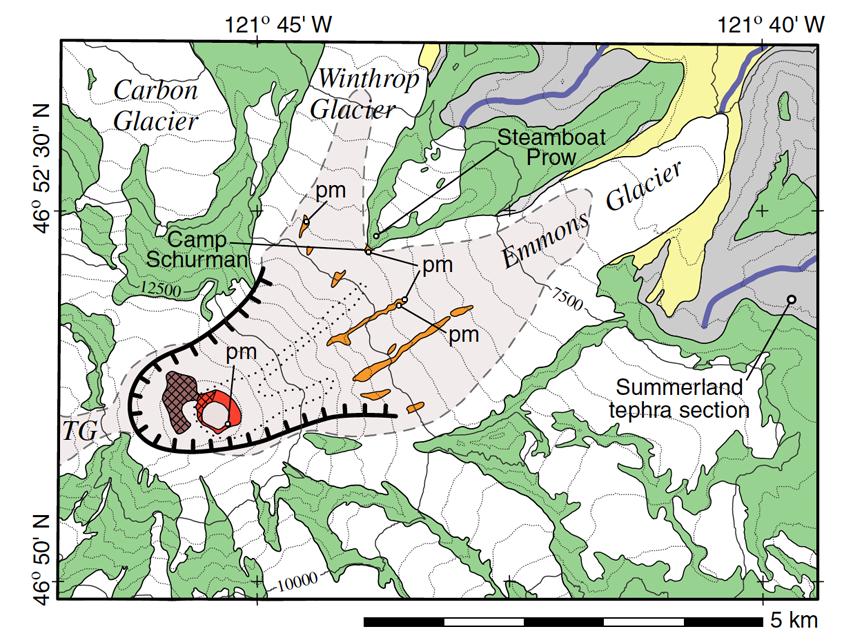
Detailed map of Mount Rainier's summit and northeast slope showing upper perimeter of Osceola collapse amphitheater (hachured line)

The Osceola Mudflow, also known as the Osceola Lahar, was a debris flow and lahar in the U.S. state of Washington that descended from the summit and northeast slope of Mount Rainier, a volcano in the Cascade Range during a period of eruptions about 5,600 years ago. It traveled down the west and main forks of the White River, passed the location of present-day Enumclaw then reached Puget Sound in several areas, including near the present day sites of Tacoma and Auburn.

The Osceola flow began either as an avalanche or series of avalanches near the summit of Mount Rainier but had transformed to a lahar within 2 km (1.2 mi) of where it was initiated as it incorporated significant amounts of water from within the volcano's hydrothermal system. The sector collapse formed a 1.8 km (1.1 mi) wide horseshoe-shaped crater, open to the northeast, almost the same size as the crater produced by the 1980 eruption of Mount St. Helens. Most of the Osceola crater has been filled in by subsequent lava eruptions, most recently about 2,200 years ago.

With a volume of 3.8 km^{3} (0.91 cu mi) and an areal extent of about 550 km^{2} (210 sq mi), the Osceola Mudflow buried a large portion of the Puget Sound lowland with hydrothermally altered volcanic material that is estimated to have been traveling at 70 km/h (43 mph) up to 50 km (31 mi) downstream from the source region. Many communities in King and Pierce counties, notably Kent, Enumclaw, Orting, Buckley, Sumner, Puyallup and Auburn, are wholly or partly located on top of Osceola Mudflow deposits which reach a depth of up to 100 m (330 ft). The flow may have buried embayments of Puget Sound.

The Osceola Mudflow was Mount Rainier's signature event during the Holocene epoch. It was named after the unincorporated community of Osceola.

== Age and source ==
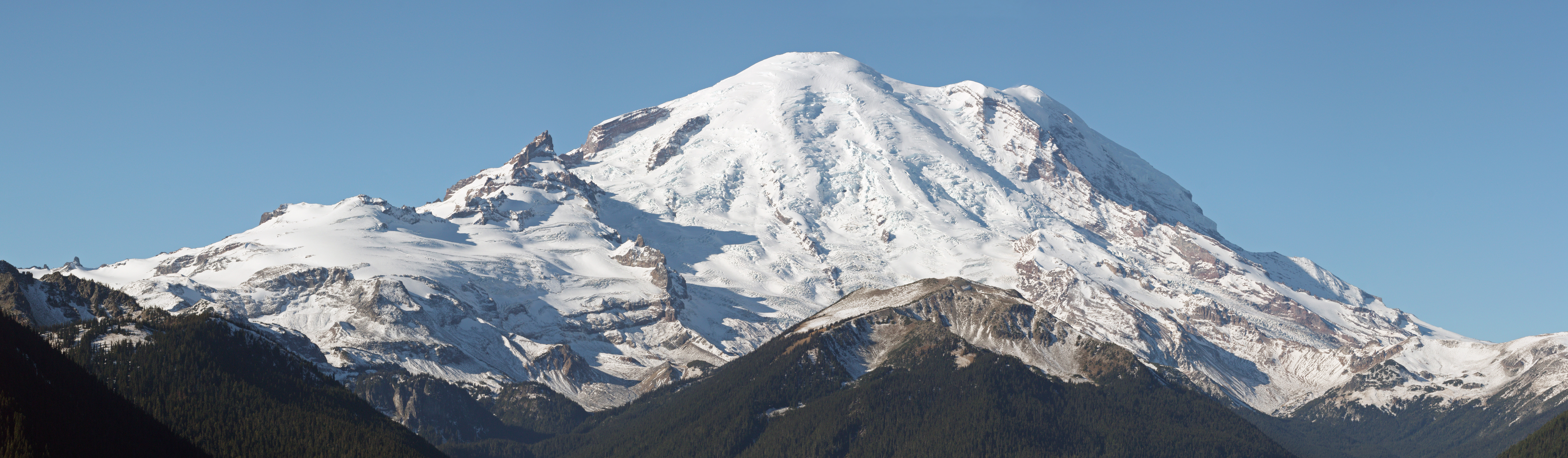
Mount Rainier with its main summit, Columbia Crest (14410 feet) at the center. Emmons Glacier covers most of the visible flank of the mountain with Disappointment Cleaver visible below Gibraltar Rock, right of the sharp pointed Little Tahoma (11138 feet). Liberty Cap (14112 feet) is visible on the right center skyline behind Russell Cliff.

The age of the mudflow has been determined by the radiocarbon dating of wood found within the debris. Eight samples range in age from 4425 ± 310 to 5040 ± 150 yr B.P. The average of the eight ages is 4832 ± 43 yr B.P. Corrected for changes in atmospheric Carbon 14 (14C), is between 5603 and 5491 yr B.P. From these samples the mudflow is thus dated to about 5600 yr B.P.

Since 1898, geologists recognized that Mount Rainier was historically higher. In 1963, D.R. Crandell inferred that the "missing summit" had collapsed down the northeast side, becoming the Osceola Mudflow. A semicircular amphitheater would have opened to the northeast. The depression then filled over time with ice (Emmons Glacier) and lava flows from a central vent. Russell Cliff, Liberty Cap, Point Success, and Disappointment Cleaver surround this feature.

Extrapolating the dipping lava beds upward, it has been estimated the height of Mount Rainier was about 4,900 metres (16,100 ft). This is similar to the depression in Mount St. Helens from the eruption of May 18, 1980. Using information from the Mount St. Helens crater the volume of Mount Rainier collapsed has been calculated to be 2.0 to 2.5 cubic kilometres (0.48 to 0.60 cu mi). An analysis of the clay and altered minerals like smectite, kaolinite, halloysite, mica, cristobalite, opal, and hematite in Osceola deposits with the same minerals in outcrops on Mount Rainier show that the mudflow began as a huge avalanche from this area.

== Volume ==
The volume of the mudflow is estimated at 3.8 cubic kilometres (0.91 cu mi) from an examination of outcrops and well logs plus an estimation of the volume parcels from across the identified flow. The mudflow centers about 80 kilometres (50 mi) from Mount Rainier. The Osceola volume of 3.8 cubic kilometres (0.91 cu mi) plus the Paradise lahar of 0.05 to 0.1 cubic kilometres (0.012 to 0.024 cu mi) is more than the 2 to 2.5 cubic kilometres (0.48 to 0.60 cu mi) of the "missing summit". The material would have expanded during the avalanche, and it would have added materials from along the route, accounting for the difference.

The Osceola debris underlies the Puyallup River valley and the Puyallup and Duwamish embayments of Puget Sound. Osceola mud has a depth of about 80 metres (260 ft) (two-thirds below sea level) north of Auburn. Near Orting the flow is 6 to 8 metres (20 to 26 ft) deep. Down valley, near Sumner on the Auburn and Puyallup deltas, of the prehistoric Puget Sound, the mudflow is 20 to 30 metres (66 to 98 ft) deep. Research shows that 1.26 cubic kilometres (0.30 cu mi) of Osceola debris spread underwater and covers 157 square kilometres (61 sq mi) in prehistoric Puget Sound. The Osceola debris increased sedimentation after the Osceola Mudflow filled the Duwamish and Puyallup arms of Puget Sound.
