= Hugh M. Caldwell =

American politician

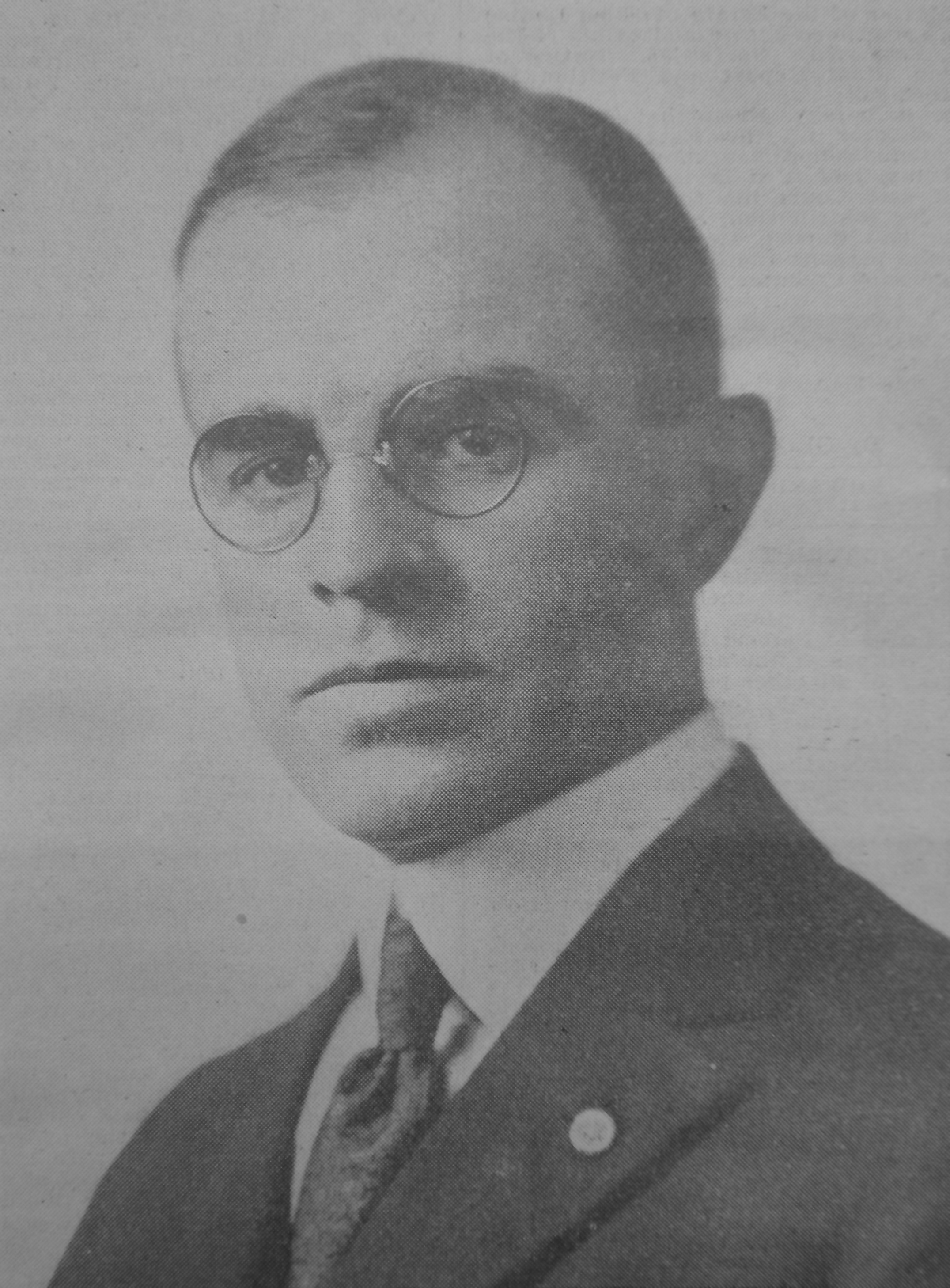

32nd Mayor of Seattle
- In office March 14, 1920 – June 5, 1922
- Preceded by: C. B. Fitzgerald
- Succeeded by: Edwin J. Brown

Personal details
- Born: June 7, 1881; Knoxville, Tennessee
- Died: January 29, 1955 (aged 73); Seattle, Washington
- Political party: Republican

Hugh M. Caldwell (June 7, 1881 – January 29, 1955) was an American politician who served as the Mayor of Seattle from 1920 to 1922.
