= C. B. Fitzgerald =

American politician

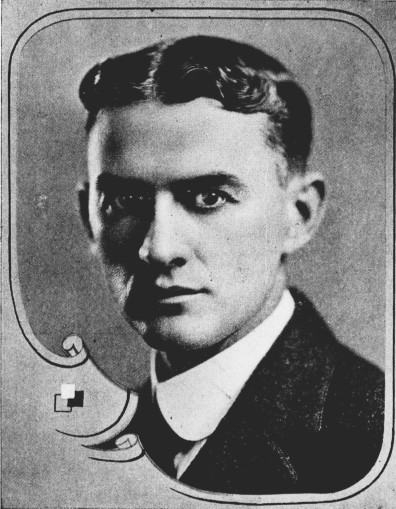

31st Mayor of Seattle
- In office August 28, 1919 – March 15, 1920
- Preceded by: Ole Hanson
- Succeeded by: Hugh M. Caldwell

Personal details
- Born: Cecil Bernard Fitzgerald; September 16, 1881; Oshkosh, Wisconsin
- Died: July 20, 1971 (aged 89); Seattle, Washington
- Political party: Republican

C. B. Fitzgerald (September 16, 1881 – July 20, 1971) was an American politician who served on the Seattle City Council from 1914 to 1919 and from 1921 to 1924 and as the Mayor of Seattle from 1919 to 1920.
