= Charles L. Smith (Seattle politician) =

American politician (1892–1982)

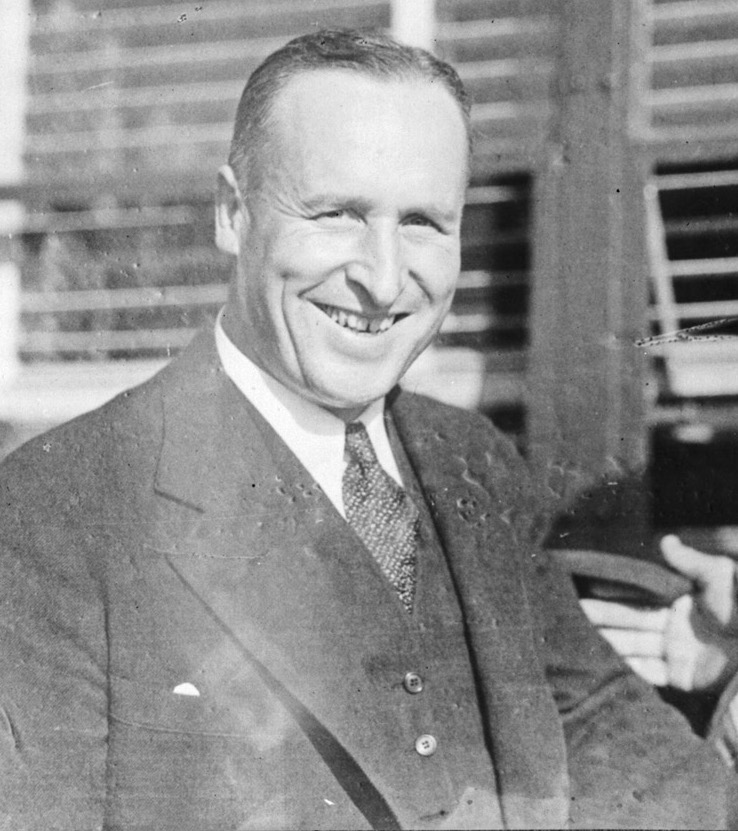

38th Mayor of Seattle
- In office June 4, 1934 – June 1, 1936
- Preceded by: John F. Dore
- Succeeded by: John F. Dore

Personal details
- Born: October 24, 1892 Osceola, Washington, US
- Died: November 7, 1982 (aged 90) Carson City, Nevada, US
- Resting place: Queen Anne, Seattle
- Party: Republican
- Spouse: Gladys F. Loer
- Education: University of Washington
- Profession: Attorney, politician

Charles L. Smith (October 24, 1892 – November 7, 1982) was the Mayor of Seattle, Washington from March 6, 1934 to 1936.

== Personal life ==
Smith was born in Osceola, Washington, on October 24, 1892, to Louis and Mary Smith. He married Gladys Loer June 2, 1922, who was a buyer for Frederick and Nelson Stores, and also a Certified Pilot.

== Background ==
He attended the University of Washington, in Seattle. He was a three-time "All Time Letter Winner", for the Huskies football team as a quarterback, in 1913, 1914, and 1923.

Charles L. Smith was first elected as City Attorney for the City of Auburn, Washington, on December 5, 1916.

He was elected into the office of Mayor of Seattle on March 6, 1934.

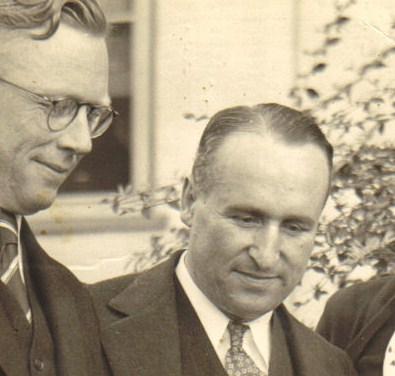
Smith being sworn into Office of Mayor of Seattle

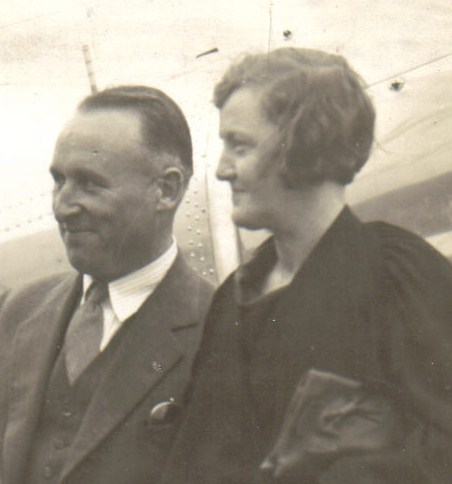
Smith and Gladys at Renton Airfield

== Waterfront Strike of 1934 ==
During his term of office as mayor, Smith had to contend with a violent Waterfront Labor dispute.

The strike began on May 9, 1934, late in the term of previous mayor John F. Dore. Longshoremen in all ports of the West Coast walked out, and in Seattle, the Masters, Mates, and Pilots Union refused to handle cargoes as the shipping companies began recruiting University of Washington students as strikebreakers. On May 13, 2000 strikers from Everett and Tacoma arrived to shore up the Seattle picket lines. This, combined with Mayor Dore's refusal to ask Governor Martin to call in the National Guard, effectively ended this effort. By May 15, off-shore unions also joined the strike, and the Teamsters ceased crossing the picket lines.

On June 4, Smith officially took office as mayor, shortly before employers offered a tentative agreement. As the proposal was debated, the new mayor declared a "State of Emergency" on June 14 and forced the police to mobilize to open the ports, which led to a standoff with the protestors. June 16 all Union Locals except Los Angeles rejected the tentative offer. After the tentative agreement was rejected by the Longshoremen, the tensions and violence started escalating.

Mayor Smith vowed to intervene on June 20 as The Seattle Post Intelligencer headlined "POLICE WILL OPEN PORTS TODAY!". The city and county amassed 300 police, 200 special deputies and 60 State Troopers. Strikers were outraged by Mayor Smith's betrayal of a promise to remain neutral and reinstated the embargo on Alaska Cargo. On July 3 in San Francisco the violence escalated, sparking a riot.

Two days later, "Bloody Thursday" occurred when police started shooting tear gas at the strikers. Seven strikers died on the Coast that summer, including a Seattle longshoreman shot by guards in Everett. A Seattle "special deputy" also died during a clash with strikers near the Smith Tower. Seattle Police armed themselves with Tommy Guns and gas grenades to defend Piers 90 and 91, while strikers lay down on train tracks to idle the docks. Mayor Charles Smith prodded Chief of Police George Howard to be more forceful, and Howard finally resigned rather than trigger a blood bath. The mayor took over and began arresting scores of suspected "Communists," but not enough to secure his re-election that fall.

The 1934 waterfront strike ended with a union victory and spurred passage of federal laws ensuring workers' right to organize and bargain collectively. Further reforms and the production demands of World War II helped to pacify labor-management relations in most industries.

Due in part to his participation in the labor dispute, Mayor Smith was defeated for re-election in the 1936 primary.

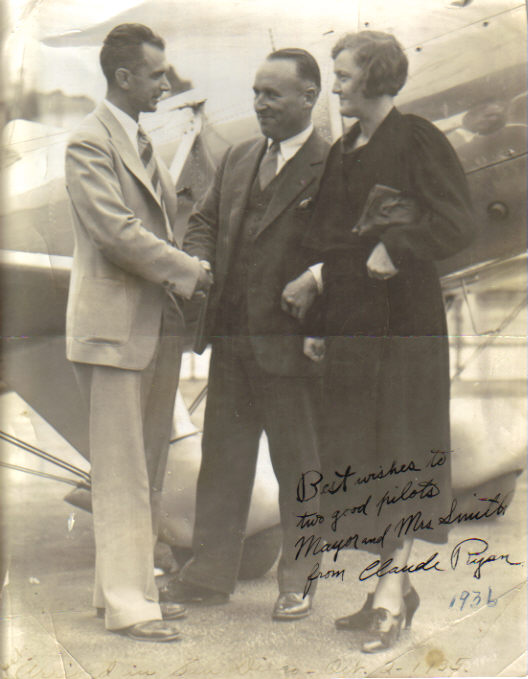
Mayor Smith and Gladys Smith with Claude Ryan, at Renton Airfield, Renton Washington

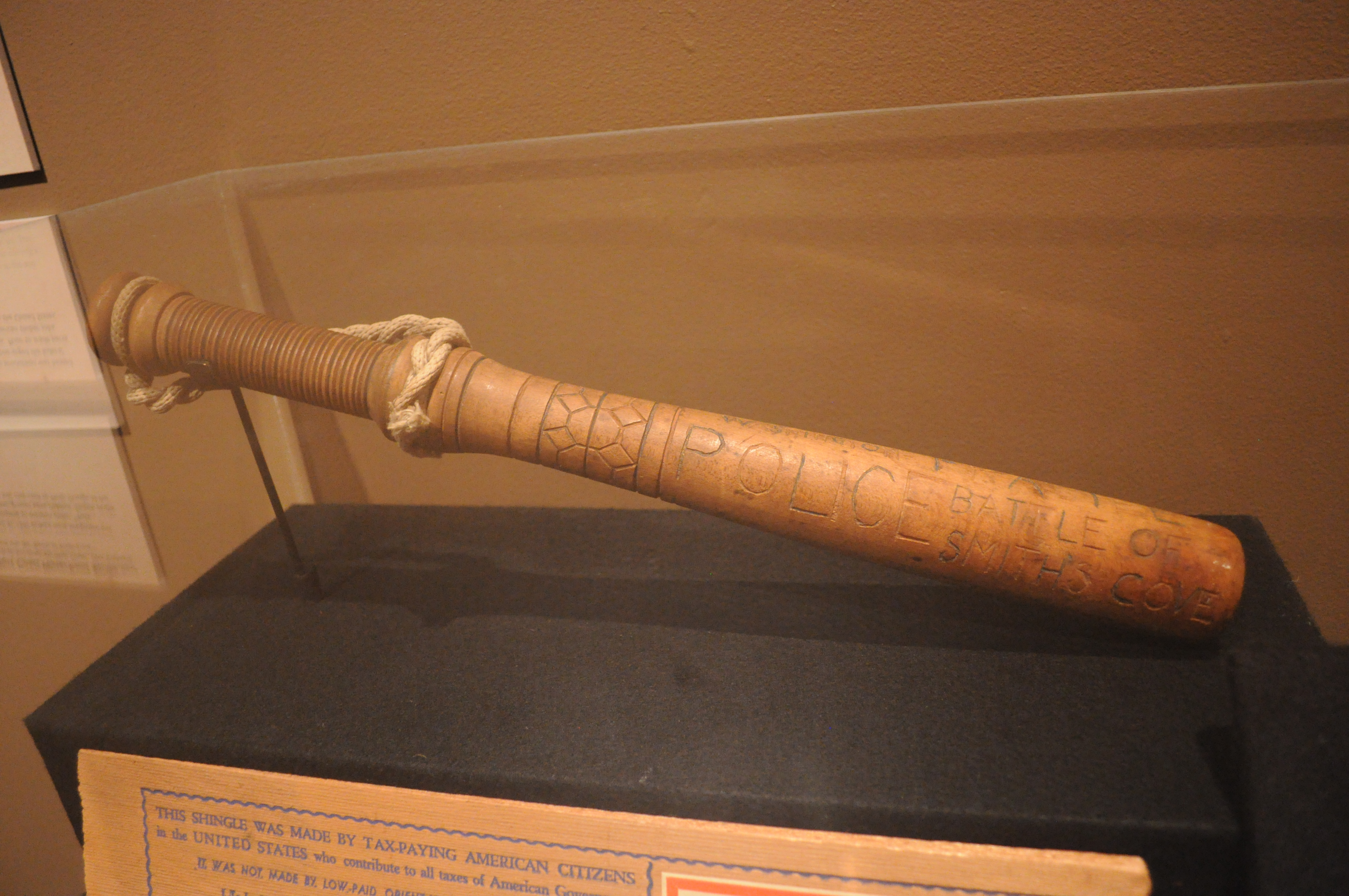
An engraved billy club commemorates police activity in the Battle of Smith Cove in Seattle

== Later years ==
Smith continued to practice law until 1960, when he and his wife Gladys traveled extensively.

The couple were both injured in a serious boat explosion while aboard the El Philern II in Bull Harbor, British Columbia, on July 22, 1960. The explosion set off a fire which then destroyed the boat. Mr and Mrs Smith were taken to a hospital in Alert Bay, British Columbia, for minor injuries. Mr. Smith suffered, bruises cuts, and burns when he was struck by a flying hatch cover, which was thrown from the explosion.

They decided to settle into a warmer climate in the winters and chose Mesa, Arizona. In the spring and summer they would drive back from Arizona and spend their time with family at Pine Lake, Issaquah, Washington.

Smith died in Carson City, Nevada on November 7, 1982. He was 90.
