= William F. Devin =

American politician (1898–1982)

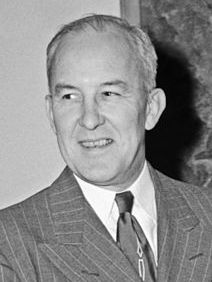

42nd Mayor of Seattle
- In office June 1, 1942 – June 1, 1952
- Preceded by: Earl Millikin
- Succeeded by: Allan Pomeroy

23rd President of the National League of Cities
- In office 1951
- Preceded by: J. Quigg Newton
- Succeeded by: Albert Cobo

Personal details
- Born: March 28, 1898 Toledo, Ohio
- Died: February 2, 1982 (aged 83) Seattle, Washington
- Party: Republican

William F. Devin (March 28, 1898 – February 2, 1982) was an American politician who served as the Mayor of Seattle from 1942 to 1952.

In 1951, Devin served as president of the National League of Cities.

He died in Seattle on February 2, 1982 at the age of 84.
