= John E. Carroll =

American lawyer and politician

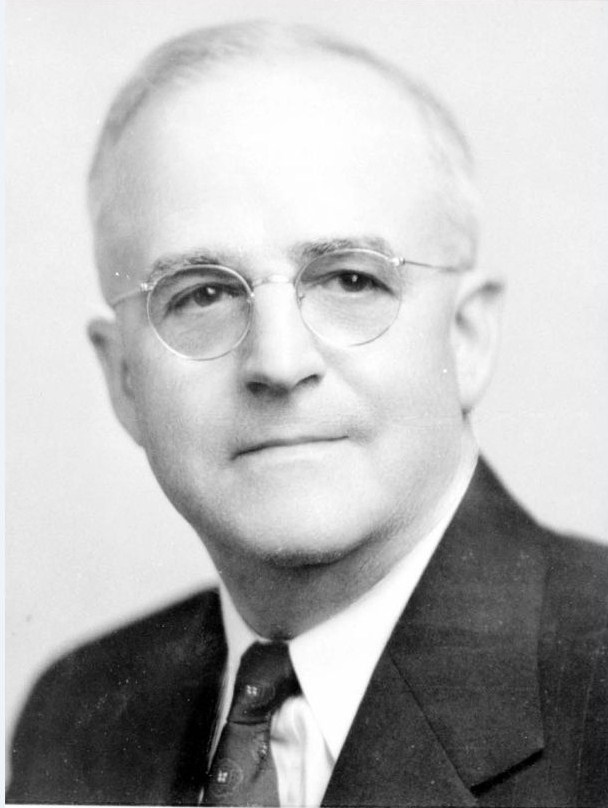
Carroll in 1941. Seattle Municipal Archives.

John Edward Carroll (October 15, 1877 – February 22, 1955) was an American lawyer and politician. He served as the Mayor of Seattle from January 27, 1941, to March 27, 1941, after being appointed to finish the term of Arthur B. Langlie, who resigned to become Governor of Washington. He was succeeded by Earl Millikin, who was elected in March 1941.

Carroll was born in New Orleans, Louisiana, and served in the United States Army during World War I. He was a member of the Seattle City Council from 1919 to 1936 and from 1938 to 1945.

Caroll died on February 22, 1955, in Shelton, at the age of 77.
