= Allan Pomeroy =

American lawyer

M. Allan Pomeroy
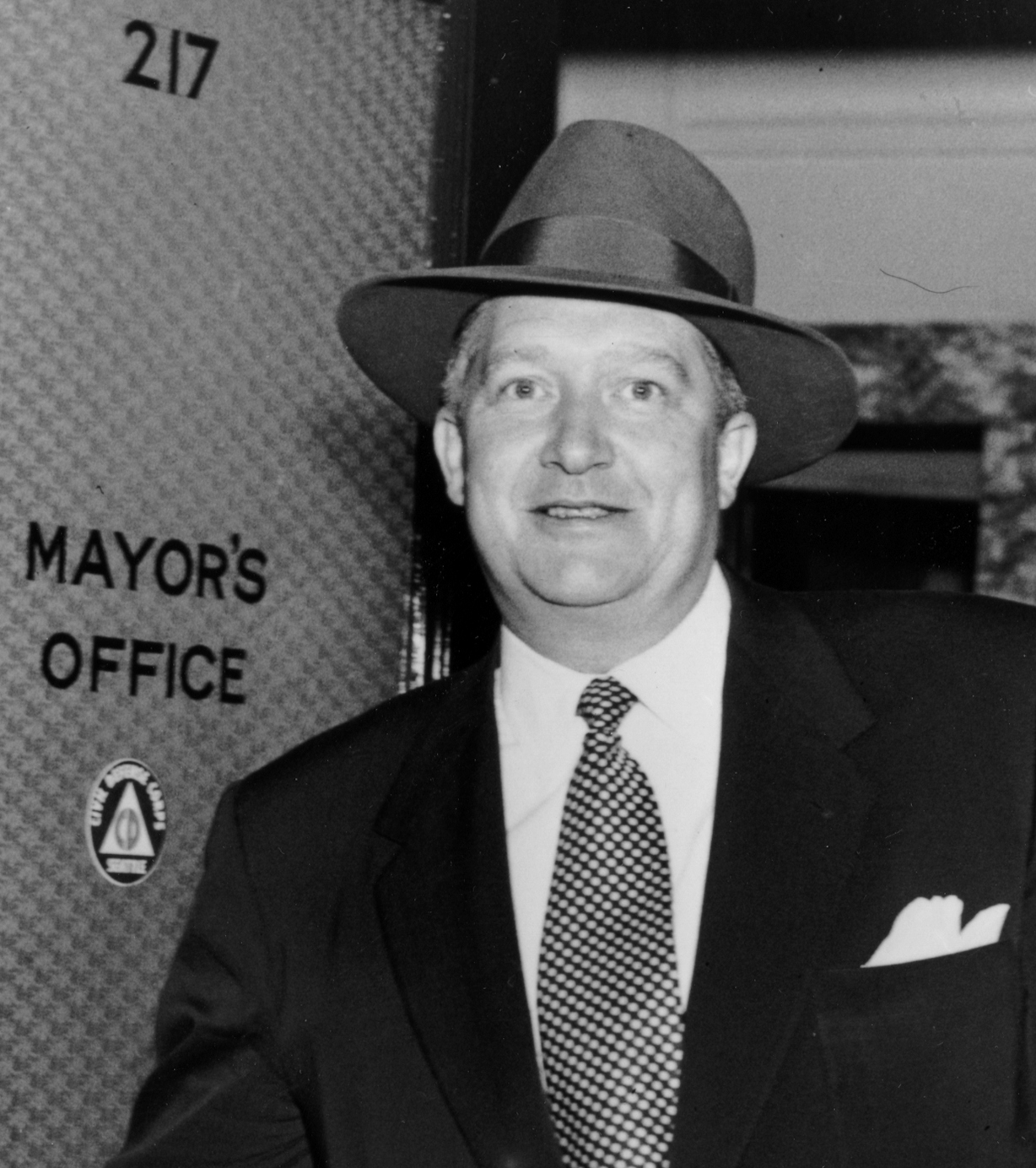
- Seattle, Washington mayor Allan Pomeroy, circa 1954, stepping out of his office in Room 217 of the City-County Building (now King County Courthouse).

43rd Mayor of Seattle
- In office June 1, 1952 – June 4, 1956
- Preceded by: William F. Devin
- Succeeded by: Gordon S. Clinton

Personal details
- Born: 1907 Astoria, Oregon, U.S.
- Died: July 7, 1966 (aged 59) Seattle, Washington
- Spouse: Loretta Tyler
- Children: Paula; Allan
- Education: University of Washington (BS 1927); University of Washington School of Law (JD 1931)
- Profession: Attorney, judge, politician

Merritt "Allan" Pomeroy (1907 – July 7, 1966) was the forty-third mayor of Seattle, Washington serving from June 1, 1952, to June 4, 1956.

== Early life ==
Pomeroy was born in Astoria, Oregon, and later moved with his parents to the state of Washington. He received his Bachelor of Science degree from the University of Washington in 1927 where he was a founding member of the Sigma Pi fraternity chapter. He earned his law degree from the University of Washington School of Law in 1931. He married Loretta Tyler and they had a daughter, Paula Pomeroy LeFavor, and a son, Allan Merritt Pomeroy.

After graduating from law school, Pomeroy became a practicing lawyer. He eventually became a judge and public servant, serving as Justice of the Peace in Kitsap County (1934-1936), acting Seattle municipal judge (1942), assistant United States Attorney for Western Washington (1942-1948), and King County Superior Court judge (1948).

== Mayor ==
In 1948, Pomeroy was defeated by a slim margin in his first bid for the mayor's office by incumbent Mayor William F. Devin. The defining issue of the election had been Devin's Tolerance Policy where small time gambling was tolerated. Devin (and Police Chief Eastman) said this was the best deterrent to major vice and police corruption. Pomeroy said this was an official acceptance of illegality. He promised to end the practice and get rid of Eastman. This promise led to enough voters switching sides for Pomeroy to win the 1952 election by a small margin. He named H.J. Lawrence as Police Chief and said that card rooms would no longer be permitted.

Pomeroy was credited with making Seattle a well known city by bringing the World's Fair to the city in 1962. Pomeroy had to bring in community and business leaders, as well as a petition campaign, to convince the city council to approve an $8.5 million bond issue to build the opera house and sports center needed to attract the fair. Eventually the council approved a $7.5 million bond issue with the state matching that amount.

In 1952, Pomeroy cut the ribbon opening the Alaskan Way Viaduct.

In April 1954, during the Seattle windshield pitting epidemic police in the Seattle area were swamped with calls of car windshields being pitted. Close to 3,000 windshields had been reported as being pitted, and no one knew what to do. Under pressure, Pomeroy first wired Washington Governor Arthur B. Langlie, then President Dwight D. Eisenhower asking for assistance. Many theories were put forth for the cause of the damage but an investigation by the Seattle Police Department determined that most of the damage was to the windshields of older cars. In cases were auto lots were involved, brand new cars were unpitted; used cars were. The damage had been there all along, it had just gone unnoticed. Sergeant Max Allison of the Seattle Police crime laboratory declared that all the damage reports were "5 percent hoodlum-ism, and 95 percent public hysteria." Area residents had become participants in a collective delusion. Within a couple of days reports of damage had ceased.

In 1955, Pomeroy appointed the Mayor's Advisory Committee on Police Practices to investigate charges of police brutality. The committee condemned police practices in the predominantly black Central District neighborhood. As a result, a program was started to improve police relations with the black community. Several police officers participated in intercultural workshops sponsored by the Seattle Public Schools and others were enrolled in race relations classes at Seattle University. The effectiveness of the program was questioned by many.

In 1956 Pomeroy lost his re-election bid to Gordon S. Clinton. Pomeroy and Police Chief Lawrence's inability to close down the card rooms were a major reason for Clinton's victory. The ousting of an incumbent mayor is rare in Seattle. It wouldn't happen again until Greg Nickels beat Paul Schell in 2001.

== After politics ==
After losing the mayor's race Pomeroy went back to practicing law. At the time of his death he was a senior partner in the law firm of Pomeroy, Zelensky, Furnia, and Munro. He was a member of several clubs and societies, including the Moose Lodge, Fraternal Order of Eagles, Kiwanis Club, the Sons of Norway and the Alaska-Yukon Pioneers. He also served as Exalted Ruler of the Seattle Elks.

He died on July 7, 1966, of a heart attack in his Seattle home, at the age of 59.
