= Henry A. Atkins =

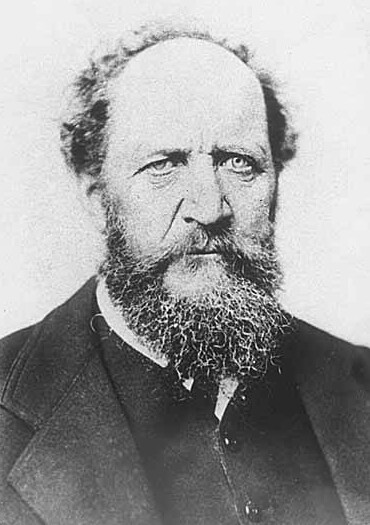

1st Mayor of Seattle
- In office December 2, 1869 – July 31, 1871
- Preceded by: Office established
- Succeeded by: John T. Jordan

Personal details
- Born: Henry Allen Atkins; 1827 Vermont, U.S.
- Died: 1885 (aged 57–58) Seattle, Washington, U.S.
- Resting place: Lake View Cemetery, Seattle, Washington
- Party: Republican
- Spouse: Mary Jane Osborne Barr
- Children: 2

Henry Allen Atkins (1827–1885) was an American businessman and the first Mayor of Seattle.

Born in Vermont, Atkins moved to California in 1850 during the gold rush to mine for gold. He arrived in Seattle in 1858, becoming a merchant and businessman. Atkins, along with two partners, owned a steam-driven pile driver that was leased for work throughout the Puget Sound region. He helped clear land for the Territorial University campus in what is now the Metropolitan Tract in Downtown Seattle.

Atkins partnered with William H. Shoudy, himself a future mayor, to operate a general store in modern-day Pioneer Square. He also was a partner in the Seattle Gas Company, the Puget Sound Wagon Road Company, and a wharf building business that worked in several ports around the region.

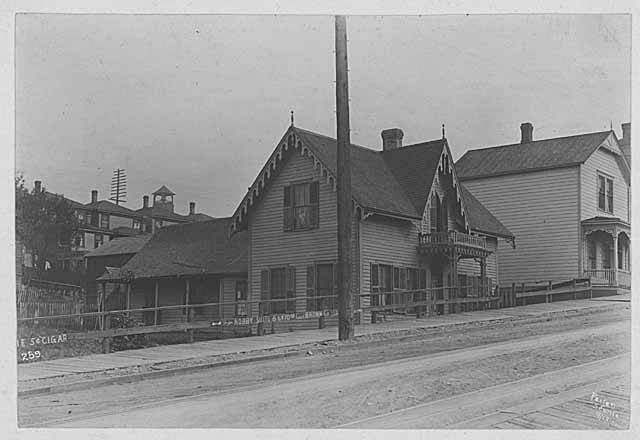
Atkins home in 1900 at 5th Avenue and James Street after it was moved

Seattle was incorporated by the Washington Territorial Legislature on December 2, 1869, and Atkins was appointed its first mayor. He was elected to the position outright on July 11, 1870, defeating Henry Yesler by sixteen votes, and served until July 1871. He remained involved in civic affairs after his mayoral tenure, later serving as sheriff of King County and as a regent of the Territorial University. He died in 1885 and was buried at Lake View Cemetery in Seattle.
