= W. D. Wood =

American politician (1858–1917)

William D. Wood

23rd Mayor of Seattle
- In office April 6, 1896 – October 18, 1897
- Preceded by: Frank D. Black
- Succeeded by: Thomas J. Humes

Personal details
- Born: 1858
- Died: 1917 (aged 58–59)
- Party: Republican

William D. Wood (1858–1917) was the 23rd mayor of Seattle, appointed to fill the vacancy of Frank D. Black. He first announced his resignation to participate in the Klondike Gold Rush before asking for a leave of absence, which the Seattle city council denied. He subsequently forfeited his seat on October 18, 1897.

== Biography ==
Before becoming Mayor, Wood was a lawyer and real-estate speculator who developed property around Green Lake. On April 6, 1896, Mayor Black submitted his resignation to the city council citing illness and a dislike for the job. Black recommended Wood for the seat, and Wood was appointed after a city council vote.

In July 1897, Wood traveled to San Francisco to speak at the International Christian Endeavor Convention. While he was at the convention, a steamboat returning from the Klondike showed up with "a ton of gold." Wood would state his resignation while still in California, but his resignation was not officially submitted to the council.

When Wood returned to Seattle in mid-August and submitted a leave of absence for at least ninety days, which was denied by the council the following day. He would still go on his trip to the Klondike, and the council stated he would forfeit his seat on October 18 if he did not return, which he did not. After 65 votes, the council appointed Thomas J. Humes to fill the vacancy on November 19, 1897.
