= Seattle windshield pitting epidemic =

1954 American mass delusion event

The Seattle windshield pitting epidemic is a phenomenon which affected Bellingham, Seattle, and other communities of Washington state in April 1954; it is considered an example of mass panic. It was characterized by widespread observation of previously unnoticed windshield holes, pits and dings, leading residents to believe that a common causative agent was at work. It was originally thought to be the work of vandals, but the rate of pitting was so great that residents began to attribute it to everything from sand flea eggs to nuclear bomb testing.

Originating in Bellingham in March, police initially believed the work to be vandals using BB guns. However the pitting was soon observed in the nearby cities of Sedro Woolley and Mount Vernon and Anacortes.

Within a week, the news and the so-called "pitting epidemic" had reached metropolitan Seattle. As the newspapers began to feature the story, more and more reports of pitting were called in. Motorists began stopping police cars to report damage. Car lots and parking garages reported particularly severe attacks.

Several hypotheses for the widespread damage were postulated:

- Some thought that a new million-watt radio transmitter at nearby Jim Creek Naval Radio Station was producing waves that caused physical oscillations in glass;
- Some believed it to be the work of cosmic rays;
- Some reported seeing glass bubbles form right before their eyes, believing it to be the work of sand fleas.

By April 15, close to 3,000 windshields had been reported as affected, which prompted mayor Allan Pomeroy to ask for help from Washington Governor Arthur B. Langlie and President Dwight D. Eisenhower.

Finally, Sergeant Max Allison of the Seattle police crime laboratory stated that the pitting reports consisted of "5 per cent hoodlum-ism, and 95 per cent public hysteria." By April 17, the pitting suddenly stopped. The following week, hundreds of windshield pitting incidents were also reported in British Columbia, Alberta, and Ontario.

The "Seattle Windshield Pitting Epidemic" as it is called has become a textbook case of collective delusion (not "mass hysteria" as reported). Although natural windshield pitting had been going on for some time, it was only when the media called public attention to it that people actually looked at their windshields and saw damage they had never noticed before.
