= Earl Millikin =

Mayor of seattle in 1941

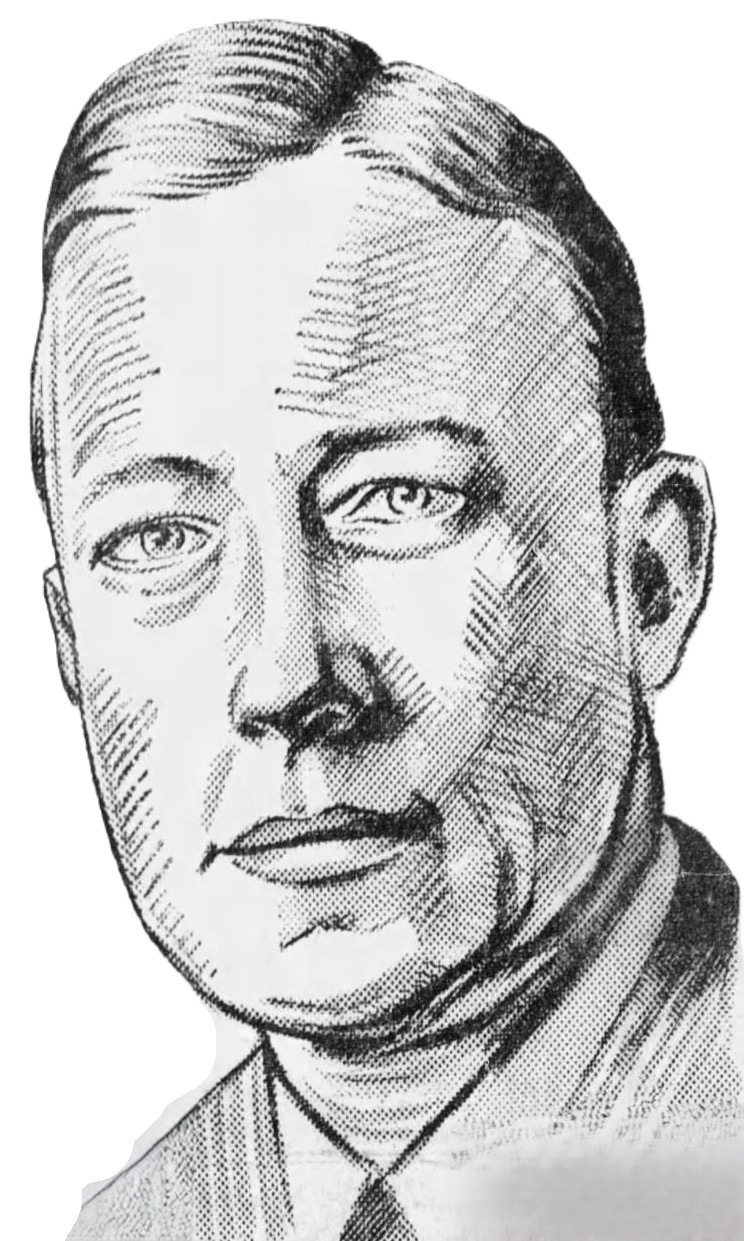
- Millikin featured in The Seattle Star, 19 February, 1942

41st Mayor of Seattle
- In office March 27, 1941 – June 1, 1942
- Preceded by: John E. Carroll
- Succeeded by: William F. Devin

Auditor of King County, Washington
- In office January 14, 1935 – March 26, 1941
- Preceded by: George A. Grant
- Succeeded by: Robert A. Morris

Personal details
- Born: September 30, 1890 Oswego, Kansas, US
- Died: March 23, 1970 (aged 79) Seattle, Washington, US
- Party: Democratic

William Earl Millikin (September 30, 1890 – March 23, 1970) was the Mayor of Seattle, Washington from 1941 to 1942.

== Early life ==
Millikin was born in Oswego, Kansas on September 30, 1890, the son of William James Millikin and Estella (Hoskins) Millikin. He attended several schools including Baker University in Baldwin City, Kansas; the University of Oregon; the University of Washington; and the University of California, Berkeley.

== Military career ==
Millikin served in the United States Army during World War I. He enlisted as a private in December 1917 and was assigned to Mechanical Repair Shop Unit 305 in El Paso, Texas. He was promoted to private first class in June 1918. In August 1918, Millikin was commissioned as a second lieutenant of Field Artillery and assigned to the Field Artillery Central Officers Training School at Camp Zachary Taylor, Kentucky. The Armistice of November 11, 1918 ended the war, and Millikin received his discharge on November 26.

Millikin continued to serve in the Organized Reserve Corps after the war, including a 1922 assignment to the 369th Field Artillery regiment, a unit of the 96th Division. By 1929, he was a captain in the 10th Field Artillery Regiment. In 1936, he was a captain in the 362nd Field Artillery, a subordinate command of the 96th Division. He was still serving as a captain in 1942, when he volunteered for active duty during World War II.

== Continued career ==
Before the 1919–1920 school year, Millikin resigned his teaching position at Lincoln High School in Portland, Oregon. He arrived at Queen Anne High School in Seattle in 1919 as a history teacher and athletic coach. He resigned from the high school eleven years later, and worked first for a book publisher and later for the state Department of Labor and Industries.

In 1937, when Millikin was King County, Washington auditor, he issued "hundreds of [marriage] licences [...] without the prospective bride and groom being compelled to appear" according to the Associated Press, who cited "white slavery" as the main opposition to Millikin's practices. He was elected to two terms as auditor.

Millikin was elected as Mayor of Seattle on March 11, 1941, defeating police chief William F. Devin in a special election to finish the term of mayor Arthur B. Langlie, who resigned to become Governor of Washington. During a strike of American Federation of Labor affiliated welders in October 1941, Seattle Mayor Millikin demanded the striking workers return to their jobs without negotiations.

Millikin was mayor at the time of the Bombing of Pearl Harbor and the United States's entry into World War II. He supported the internment of Japanese Americans, which began in early 1942, and stirred fears of Japanese traitors that would burn Seattle to the ground. On March 8, 1942, Millikin was at the launching of the USS Carmick (DD-493) when he said it would be "heard in Australia and Tokyo" in front of ten thousand shipyard workers and United States Navy men.

Millikin lost to Devin in the 1942 mayoral election.

== Later life ==
After leaving the mayor's office, Millikin was called to active duty with the United States Army and served with Artillery units in the South Pacific. He continued to serve in the Reserve after the war, and retired as a lieutenant colonel in 1950. Millikin would go on to work for the State Department of Veteran Affairs and as a distillery representative before serving on the civil staff of King County Sheriff Tim McCullough until his permanent retirement in 1960.

He died in Seattle on March 23, 1970.
