= Corliss P. Stone =

American mayor

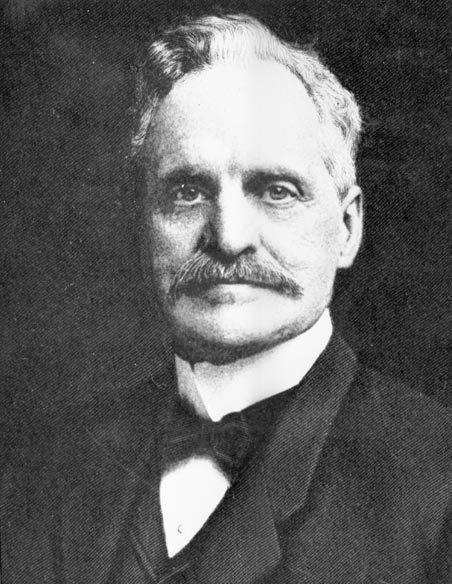

3rd Mayor of Seattle
- In office July 29, 1872 – February 23, 1873
- Preceded by: John T. Jordan
- Succeeded by: John T. Jordan

Personal details
- Born: 1838
- Died: 1906 (aged 67–68)

Corliss P. Stone (1838–1906) was elected mayor of Seattle in 1872. Prior to election as mayor, Stone had served three terms as a city council member. Stone Way North, Stone Avenue North, and Corliss Avenue North, streets in Seattle's Wallingford neighborhood, are named after him.

Stone was notorious for having allegedly embezzled money from his business partner Charles Hiram Burnett Sr. of Seattle. Stone in fact removed the cash from their safe and money from the bank leaving Burnett with the duty of settling the firm's accounts payable. The title to property owned by the firm, however, was turned over to Burnett. Burnett and Stone later negotiated a settlement which allowed Stone to return to Seattle for the purpose of engaging in business independently again.

Stone continued to be active in business and real estate before his death in 1906.

Political offices
Preceded by John T. Jordan	Mayor of Seattle; 1872–1873	Succeeded by John T. Jordan
