= John Collins (Seattle politician) =

Mayor of Seattle

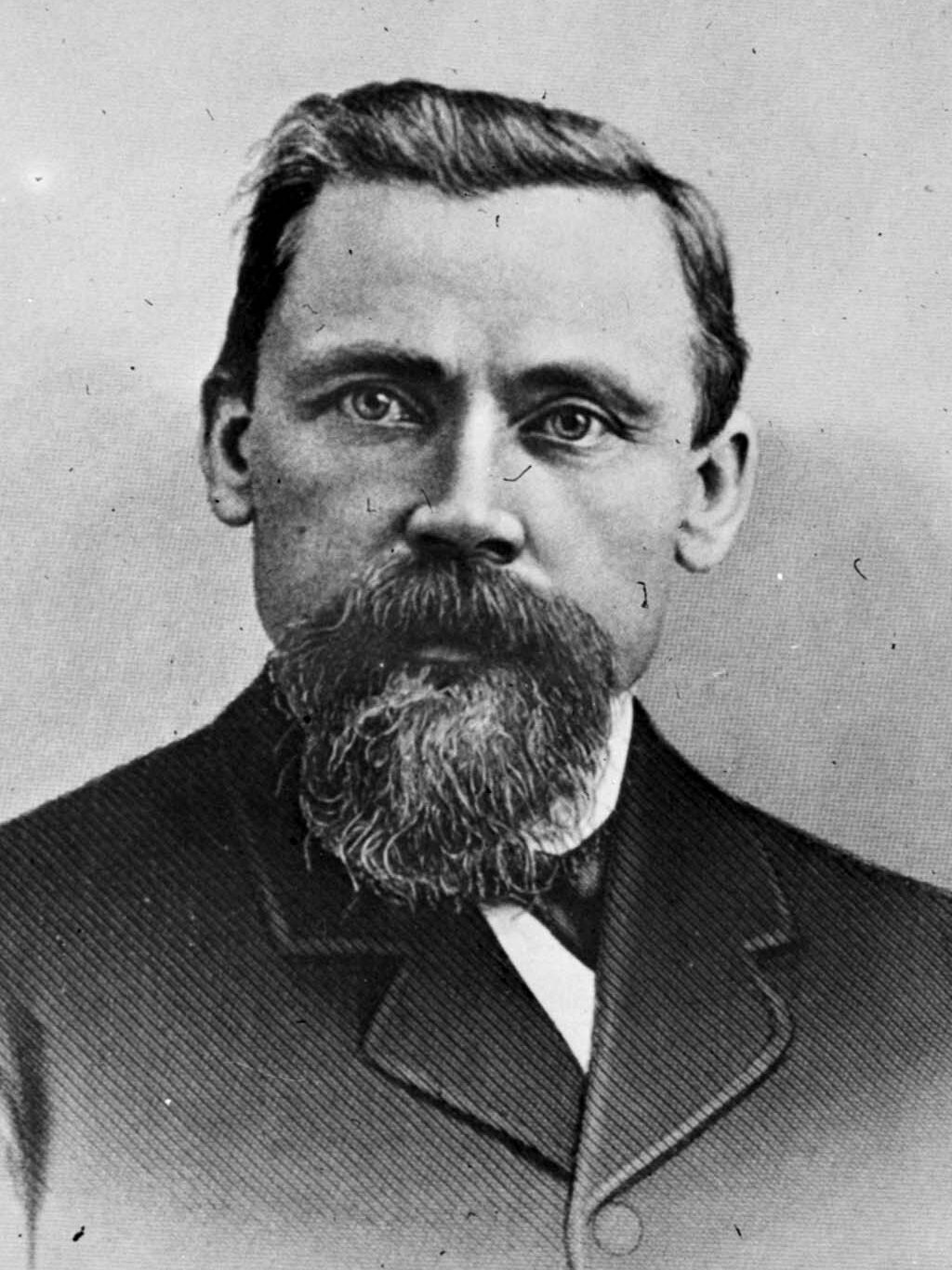

5th Mayor of Seattle
- In office August 3, 1873 – August 2, 1874
- Preceded by: Moses R. Maddocks
- Succeeded by: Henry Yesler

Personal details
- Born: 1835 County Cavan, Ireland
- Died: April 22, 1903 (aged 67–68) Seattle, Washington
- Party: Democratic
- Relations: Bertrand Collins (son)

John Collins (1835 – April 22, 1903) was an Irish-American businessman who served as the fourth elected mayor of Seattle, Washington.

Collins was born in County Cavan, Ireland and emigrated to the United States at age 10, settling in New York, before moving first to Maine, and then to Port Gamble, Washington to work at the Puget Sound Mill Company. Arriving in Seattle in the 1865, he successfully invested in a number of industrial concerns, including the Talbot coal mine, and the Seattle Gas Light Company, and purchased and ran the city's Occidental Hotel. By the 1880s, his business acumen had left him one of the city's wealthiest citizens. From 1869 to 1883, he served on the city council, including one year service as mayor of Seattle, in 1873. He was notable for being a "rare Catholic Democrat among the city's Protestant Republican ruling class".

In 1869, Collins was elected to the Seattle Common Council after the Washington Territorial Legislature granted Seattle a city charter. As a Democrat, Collins was elected the city's mayor on July 14, 1873. At the end of his one-year term as mayor, he was elected to a one-year term on the Common Council. In 1881, Collins performed the duties of "acting mayor" for a month, during which time he signed a municipal water supply-related ordinance into law.

In the 1890s Collins purchased the Press Times (predecessor to the Seattle Times), later selling it to new owners who, in turn, sold it to its long-time owners the Blethen family.

Collins was a member of a commission tasked with writing a new city charter in 1890. In 1892, he was chairman of a committee tasked with the construction of a new city hall and jail.

The Collins Building, a property commissioned by John Collins and situated on land once occupied by his personal home, is located at Second Avenue and James Street in Seattle.

He died on April 22, 1903, after a two-year stomach disease.
