= Thomas J. Humes =

American politician (1849–1904)

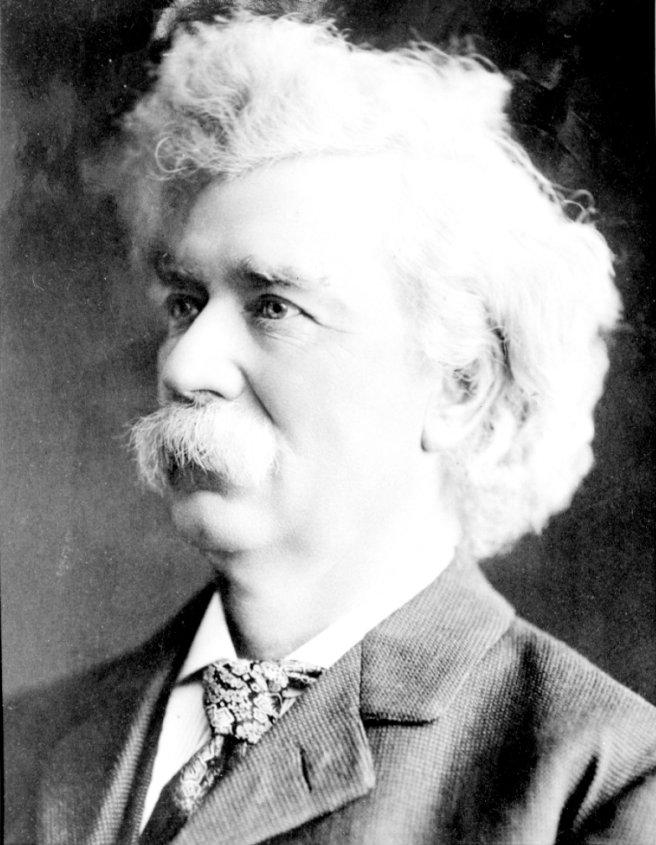
- Humes, c. 1900

23rd Mayor of Seattle
- In office November 19, 1897 – March 21, 1904
- Preceded by: W. D. Wood
- Succeeded by: Richard A. Ballinger

Member of the Washington Territorial Legislature
- In office 1887–1889
- Preceded by: Patrick Halloran

Member of the Kansas House of Representatives
- In office 1877–1881
- Constituency: 105th district

Personal details
- Born: Thomas Jefferson Humes; February 14, 1849 Clinton County, Indiana, U.S.
- Died: November 9, 1904 (aged 55) Fairbanks, Alaska, U.S.
- Party: Republican
- Spouse: Alma Roberts
- Children: 8

Thomas Jefferson Humes (February 14, 1849 – November 9, 1904) was an American politician who served as the Mayor of Seattle from 1897 to 1904, as a member of the Republican Party. Prior to his mayoralty he served in the Kansas House of Representatives and the legislature of the Washington Territory.

Born in Clinton County, Indiana, Humes was educated in Keokuk County, Iowa, and studied law in Sigourney, Iowa. He practiced law in Washington County, Kansas, before being elected as the county's prosecuting attorney. After serving two terms in the state house he unsuccessfully ran for Kansas Attorney General and worked as an Assistant United States Attorney.

Moving to Washington in 1882, Humes served in the territorial legislature for one term. He worked as a lawyer before Governor Elisha P. Ferry appointed him as a judge in 1890. The Seattle City Council appointed him to replace Mayor W. D. Wood in 1897, and he won in the 1898, 1900, and 1902 elections.

== Early life ==
Thomas Jefferson Humes was born in Clinton County, Indiana, near the Wabash River, on February 14, 1849, to James Humes and Sarah Start. His family were of Scottish descent. His family moved to Keokuk County, Iowa, in 1853, and was educated there before becoming a teacher at age 17.

Humes was a member of the Kansas state militia in 1868, and fought Native Americans. After studying law under George D. Wooden in Sigourney, Iowa, he was admitted to the Iowa Bar in February 1870. He married Alma Roberts, with whom he had eight children.

== Career ==
=== Kansas ===
Practicing law in Washington County, Kansas, Humes was elected prosecuting attorney for the county. In 1873, Humes travelled to the Pacific coast and went through Nevada, California, and Oregon before returning to Kansas in 1874.

Humes was elected to the Kansas House of Representatives from the 105th district as a Republican in 1876, and 1878. He sought the position of Kansas Attorney General in 1880, but lost the Republican nomination to William Agnew Johnston. He assumed duties as an Assistant United States Attorney in Topeka, Kansas, on December 10, 1880, and served until his resignation in 1882, in order to move to Seattle, Washington Territory.

=== Washington ===
Patrick Halloran, a member of the territorial legislature in Washington, was murdered and Humes was elected in the 1887 special election to succeed him. During his tenure in the legislature he served on the Corporations, Counties, Military Affairs, and Mining committees and chaired the Judiciary committee.

After practicing law alone in Seattle from 1882 to 1888, Humes formed a partnership with William R. Andrews in 1888, under the name Humes & Andrews. This firm continued until Governor Elisha P. Ferry appointed him as a judge on March 3, 1890. During his judicial tenure he oversaw the trial of Thomas Hamilton Blanck. He won in the 1890 and 1892 elections, but lost in 1896. The Republicans of King County attempted to have Humes nominated for Washington Supreme Court in 1894, but were unsuccessful.

=== Mayoralty ===
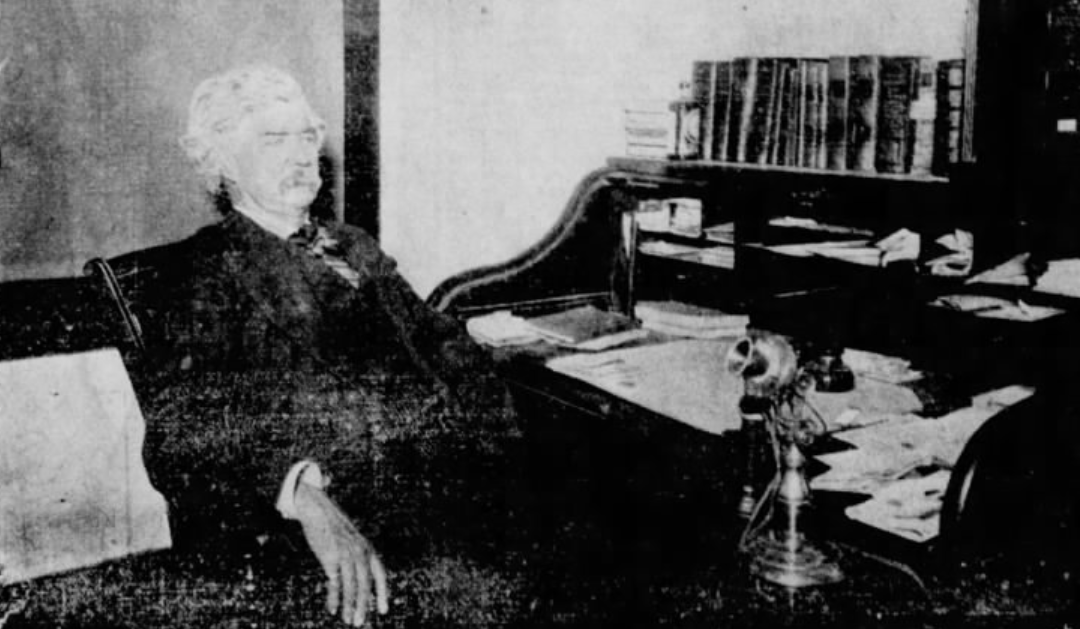
Thomas J. Humes in his office in 1900

Mayor Frank D. Black resigned three weeks into his tenure and was replaced by W. D. Wood. However, Wood resigned in order to participate in the Klondike Gold Rush. After 65 ballots, the Seattle City Council selected Humes to fill the vacant mayoral post on November 19, 1897. The Republicans nominated him for mayor and he defeated fusionist candidate Samuel J. Calderhead in the 1898 election.

Seeking to succeed John L. Wilson in the United States Senate, Humes ran in the 1899 election and was endorsed by the King County Republicans, but lost to Addison G. Foster on February 1, 1899, after 24 ballots. Humes unsuccessfully sought the Republican gubernatorial nomination for the 1900 election, but lost.

Humes was reelected in 1900, despite facing opposition from Wilson's supporters, who unsuccessfully ran Harry C. Gordon for the Republican nomination. He defeated Democratic nominee J.W. Godwin in 1902. George U. Piper, the business manager of the Seattle Post-Intelligencer, managed Humes's campaign in 1900 and 1902. On September 1, 1903, he announced that he would not seek reelection.

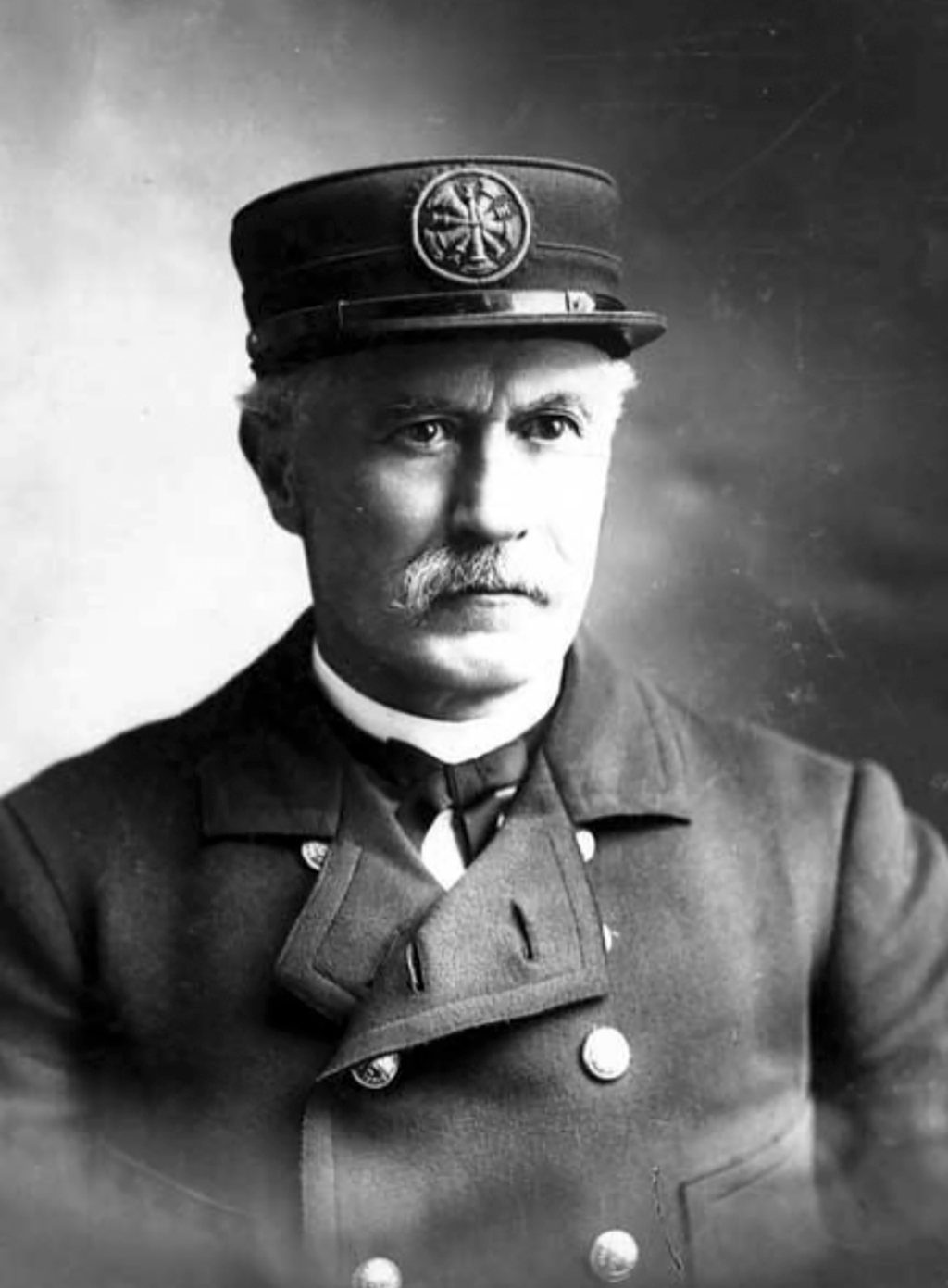
Gardner Kellogg was the chief of Seattle's fire department during Humes's tenure as mayor and was appointed Fire Marshal in 1901.

During Humes's tenure as mayor the city lighting plant was completed and the city's rail system was expanded and consolidated into a public transportation system. Gardner Kellogg, chief of the fire department, was appointed Seattle's first Fire Marshal by Humes in February 1901. William Meredith, chief of the Seattle Police Department, resigned on June 22, 1901, after it was revealed he accepted bribes and allowed illegal gambling to occur; he was later shot to death on June 25, due to a dispute with John Considine.

A story claims that people confused Mark Twain for Humes when Twain came to Seattle in the 1890s. Humes was missing for over 30 hours after he slipped and sprained his ankle on September 25, 1902, while hunting a bear, but was discovered by a search party after a storm. John Sullivan, Walter S. Fulton, and Humes were indicted on March 11, 1903, for failing to enforce gambling laws, but these were dismissed via demurrer on April 13.

== Death ==
Humes and his brother James left for the District of Alaska in September 1904, in order to prospect for gold and arrived in Fairbanks, Alaska, after stopping in Dawson City, Yukon. He suffered a heart attack in Fairbanks, on November 9, 1904. His body was shipped on December 8, using dog sleds, reached Copper Center, Alaska, on December 21, and was delivered to Seattle via ship on January 10, 1905. Samuel Humes, his son, served on the Seattle City Council in the 1930s and 1940s.

== Political positions ==
Humes was an opponent of women's suffrage and supported the Chinese Exclusion Act.

== Electoral history ==
Electoral history of Kevin Kiley
Year	Office	Party	Primary			General			Result	Ref.
Year	Office	Party	Total	%	P.	Total	%	P.	Result	Ref.
1898	Mayor of Seattle	Republican				3,263	55.79%	1st	Won	
1900	Mayor of Seattle	Republican	248.67	72.50%	1st				Won	
1902	Mayor of Seattle	Republican				7,875	64.32%	1st	Won	

== Works cited ==
=== Books ===
- Hines, H. (1893). An Illustrated History of the State of Washington. Lewis Publishing Company.
- Wilder, Daniel (1886). The Annals of Kansas. Kansas Publishing House.

=== Newspapers ===
- "1876 Election". Leavenworth Times. November 11, 1876. p. 1 – via Newspapers.com.
- "A Republican Nomination". San Francisco Chronicle. November 6, 1887. p. 15 – via Newspapers.com.
- "A Strenuous Experience". Fresno Morning Republican. September 28, 1902. p. 2 – via Newspapers.com.
- "Appointment of Superior Judge for King County". Statesman Journal. March 4, 1890. p. 1 – via Newspapers.com.
- "Assistant U.S. Attorney". The Daily Commonwealth. December 10, 1880. p. 3 – via Newspapers.com.
- "Body of Ex-Mayor Humes Arrives". Seattle Post-Intelligencer. January 11, 1905. p. 16 – via Newspapers.com.
- "Borne To Last Rest". Seattle Post-Intelligencer. January 14, 1905. p. 11 – via Newspapers.com.
- "Endorse Hume's Candidacy". The Spokesman-Review. September 16, 1894. p. 5 – via Newspapers.com.
- "Ex-Mayor Humes Dies In Alaska". Seattle Post-Intelligencer. November 10, 1904. p. 1 – via Newspapers.com.
- "Fell Dead On The Street". Washington Palladium. November 19, 1904. p. 8 – via Newspapers.com.
- "Formerly of Kansas". The Kansas Chief. December 22, 1887. p. 2 – via Newspapers.com.
- "Fusion defeat". Spokane Daily Chronicle. March 11, 1898. p. 2 – via Newspapers.com.
- "Humes' Body Is Shipped". Seattle Post-Intelligencer. December 10, 1904. p. 1 – via Newspapers.com.
- "Humes Gets The Renomination". Tacoma Daily Ledger. February 22, 1900. p. 8 – via Newspapers.com.
- "Humes Is Elected". The Oregonian. March 5, 1902. p. 1 – via Newspapers.com.
- "Humes Is Stirred Up". The Spokesman-Review. October 14, 1900. p. 9 – via Newspapers.com.
- "Humes Men Had Ticket Made Up". The Spokesman-Review. February 22, 1902. p. 1 – via Newspapers.com.
- "Humes Shies His Castor". Tacoma Daily Ledger. July 17, 1898. p. 1 – via Newspapers.com.
- "Humes To Quit". The Oregonian. September 3, 1903. p. 4 – via Newspapers.com.
- "Indictment Dismissed". Spokane Daily Chronicle. April 13, 1903. p. 1 – via Newspapers.com.
- "It Is Senator Foster". Tacoma Daily Ledger. February 2, 1899. p. 1 – via Newspapers.com.
- "Jury Votes To Indict". Seattle Post-Intelligencer. March 11, 1903. p. 1 – via Newspapers.com.
- "King County Endorses Humes". Tacoma Daily Ledger. September 17, 1898. p. 8 – via Newspapers.com.
- "Legislative Proceedings". Columbia Twice-A-Week Chronicle. December 17, 1887. p. 5 – via Newspapers.com.
- "Mark Twain's Double". The Wichita Eagle. November 21, 1901. p. 4 – via Newspapers.com.
- "Mayor-Elect Humes". Seattle Post-Intelligencer. March 9, 1898. p. 1 – via Newspapers.com.
- "Mayor Humes' Body At Copper Center". Tacoma Daily Ledger. December 25, 1904. p. 3 – via Newspapers.com.
- "Mayor Humes Lost In Woods". The Spokesman-Review. September 27, 1902. p. 1 – via Newspapers.com.
- "Personal". Seattle Post-Intelligencer. July 14, 1888. p. 3 – via Newspapers.com.
- "Republicans Elect With One Exception All Their Candidates". The Seattle Star. March 5, 1902. p. 1 – via Newspapers.com.
- "Republicans of Seattle". The Spokesman-Review. February 25, 1898. p. 1 – via Newspapers.com.
- "Republican State Convention". Topeka Weekly Times. August 27, 1880. p. 12 – via Newspapers.com.
- "Seattle Election". Spokane Falls Review. November 27, 1887. p. 1 – via Newspapers.com.
- "The Mayor For Governor". Seattle Post-Intelligencer. May 19, 1900. p. 5 – via Newspapers.com.
- "The Republican Ticket". Seattle Post-Intelligencer. September 20, 1894. p. 4 – via Newspapers.com.
- "Thomas J. Humes Mayor of Seattle". Seattle Post-Intelligencer. November 20, 1904. p. 1 – via Newspapers.com.
- "Washington County Republicans Nominations". Lawrence Daily Journal. October 5, 1876. p. 2 – via Newspapers.com.
- "Wilson Forces Defeated". The Spokesman-Review. February 18, 1900. p. 1 – via Newspapers.com.

=== News ===
- Farr, Sheila (June 17, 2022). "After 100 years at the King County Courthouse, Ella Shepard Bush's portraits of judges are now lost and/or damaged". The Seattle Times. Archived from the original on March 22, 2025.
- Banel, Feliks (March 10, 2021). "Art Langlie weighs grandfather's legacy and a run for Seattle mayor". KIRO-FM. Archived from the original on March 22, 2025.

=== Web ===
- "2011 Find of the Month Archive". Seattle. Archived from the original on March 22, 2025.
- "Mayors, 1890-1948". Seattle. Archived from the original on March 21, 2025.
- Dougherty, Phil (March 19, 2014). "Seattle's newly resigned police chief William Meredith is killed in a sensational shootout in Seattle on June 25, 1901". HistoryLink. Archived from the original on March 22, 2025.
- McClary, Daryl (September 18, 2009). "Charles W. Nordstrom is hanged on August 23, 1901, for the murder of William Mason near Cedar Mountain (King County)". HistoryLink. Archived from the original on March 21, 2025.
- McClary, Daryl (September 23, 2020). "Fire at the West Street Hotel in Seattle kills 16 lodgers on October 27, 1894". HistoryLink. Archived from the original on March 21, 2025.
- McClary, Daryl (March 23, 2010). "Outlaw Thomas Blanck shoots and kills Charles H. Bridwell during a robbery in Seattle on October 3, 1894". HistoryLink. Archived from the original on March 21, 2025.
- Wilma, David (November 16, 2000). "City Council appoints Thomas J. Humes as Mayor of Seattle on November 19, 1897". HistoryLink. Archived from the original on March 21, 2025.
