= Frank D. Black =

American politician (1854–1919)

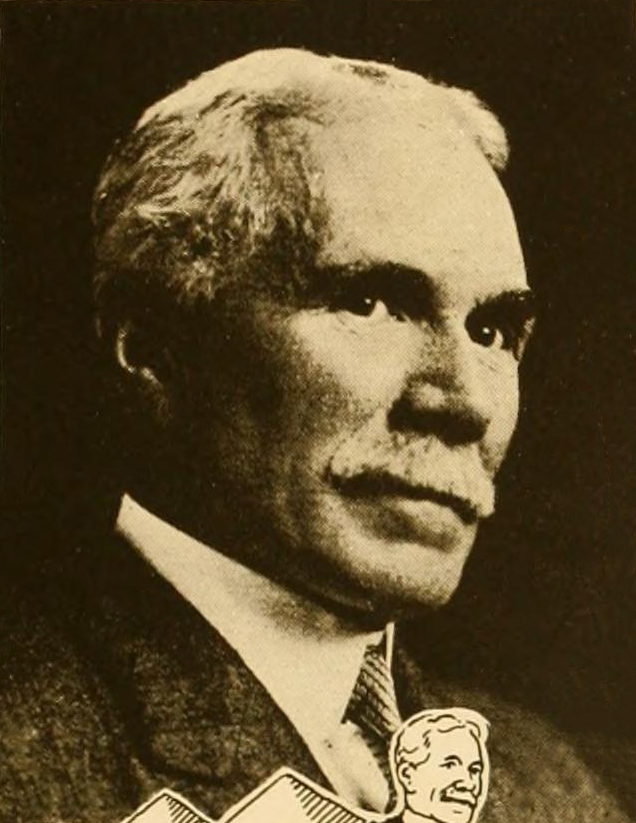

22nd Mayor of Seattle
- In office March 16, 1896 – April 6, 1896
- Preceded by: Byron Phelps
- Succeeded by: W. D. Wood

Personal details
- Born: 1854
- Died: 1919 (aged 64–65); Seattle, Washington
- Political party: Republican

Frank D. Black (1854–1919) was an American businessman who served as the 22nd Mayor of Seattle for three weeks, the shortest amount of time of any elected mayor in Seattle's history.

== Seattle mayor ==
In the 1896 election, two populists were running for mayor which worried mainstream Republicans. With the Freeholders' Charter of 1890, the term of office was changed to two years and incumbents were ineligible to run again until a further two years had passed. Consequently, Byron Phelps was ineligible for re-election.

Republicans nominated Black, owner of Seattle Hardware Co., who reluctantly accepted. Black won the election with 51% of the vote, while his nearest challenger, J. Eugene Jordan, garnered 35%.

After his election, Black was inundated with political favors, which made him "disgusted" with politics and not excited for his new job as mayor. At his swearing-in, Black stated, "I am afraid you will have to be seeking a new mayor before long." As mayor, Black was overwhelmed by people asking for political favors in his office and at his Beacon Hill home. In early April, Black would say he was ill and unable to continue as mayor and submitted his resignation to the city council on April 6, 1894. W.D. Wood was then appointed mayor but resigned a year later to take part in the Klondike Gold Rush.

Black is the shortest-serving elected mayor in Seattle's history and had the shortest tenure for a Seattle mayor until Bruce Harrell served for five days after being appointed mayor.

== Post-mayor ==
After his resignation, Black worked in real estate. Black's former home was located in the Beacon Hill neighborhood, but the majority was torn down due to a housing shortage. The city council designated the cobblestone structures on the property as a Seattle landmark.
