= Osceola, Washington =

Ghost town in Washington (state)

- Ghost town
- Location within Washington (state) Location within the United States
- Coordinates: 47°11′42″N 122°02′14″W
- Country: United States
- State: Washington
- County: King
- Time zone: UTC-8 (Pacific (PST))
  - Summer (DST): UTC-7 (PDT)

Osceola was an unincorporated community that existed in King County, Washington, around the turn of the 20th century, about two miles southeast of Enumclaw. Today not much remains except the last surviving one-room schoolhouse on the Enumclaw plateau; it is now the Osceola Community Club, a women's social club. The Osceola Mudflow that spread from nearby Mount Rainier approximately 5,000 years ago forms much of the Enumclaw plateau, and was named after the community.

== See also ==
- List of ghost towns in Washington
