= Sam Israel =

American businessman

- Born: March 4, 1899; Rhodes, Greece
- Died: June 11, 1994 (aged 95); Seattle, Washington, United States
- Occupation: Real estate investor
- Known for: Founder of Samis Land Company

Sam Israel (March 4, 1899 – June 11, 1994) was an American real estate investor and landlord.

== Biography ==
Israel was born to a Greek Jewish family in Rhodes, then part of the Ottoman Empire, now part of Greece. He immigrated to the United States in 1919 and became a shoemaker in Seattle, Washington. After World War II, during which he had a military contract to repair combat boots at Fort Lewis near Tacoma, he began to invest in real estate. His holdings, many of them in the Pioneer Square historic district, were largely dilapidated and undesirable to the majority of investors. Through what Paul Dorpat in Pacific Northwest Magazine called Israel's "benign neglect," many of these buildings survived to be renovated after his death in 1994. It was well known among Seattle artists that renting in an Israel building was good for art. He never raised the rent.

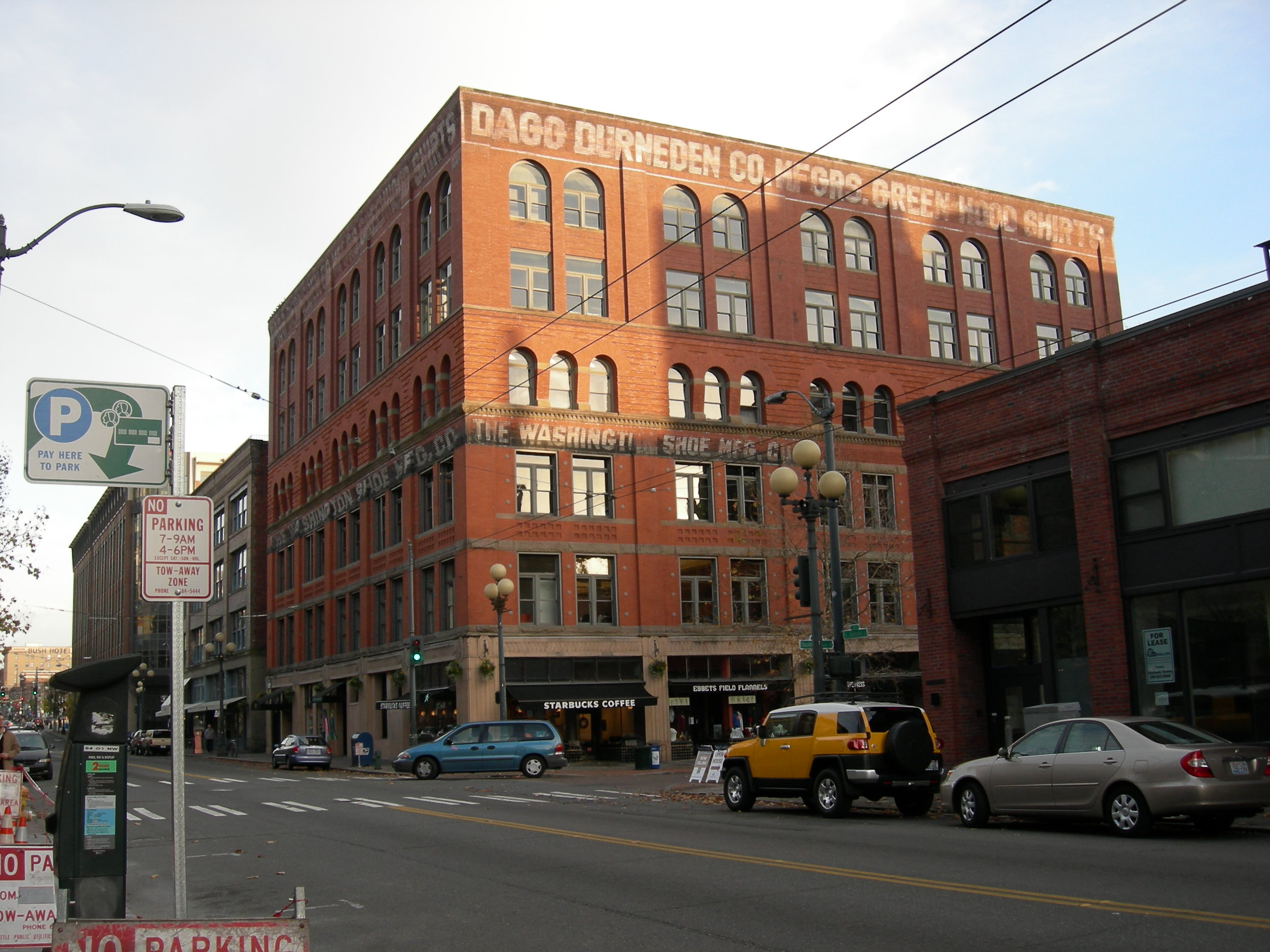
The Washington Shoe Building, a Samis-owned building in Seattle's Pioneer Square neighborhood.

Israel established the Samis Land Company (now simply Samis) to manage his holdings. The name is based on his first and last names. In 1979, he established the Samis Foundation.

Israel spent much of his later years in Soap Lake, Washington, which was said to remind him of the land of Israel. He never married. He died in Seattle at age 95.

== Legacy ==
The Samis Foundation is supported by Samis and has granted over $100 million toward "enhanc[ing] the quality and continuity of Jewish life in Washington State and the State of Israel." The foundation states that over 80% of its annual grants support Jewish education in Washington.

Samis currently owns over 500 parcels in Washington, including 16,000 acres (65 km^{2}) of land outside Seattle. Within Seattle, Samis owns two blocks in Downtown and 11 historic buildings in Pioneer Square. The Smith Tower was part of its portfolio from 1996 to 2006, and it currently owns the Collins Building, among other properties.
