= John Leary (politician) =

American politician (1837–1905)

John J. Leary
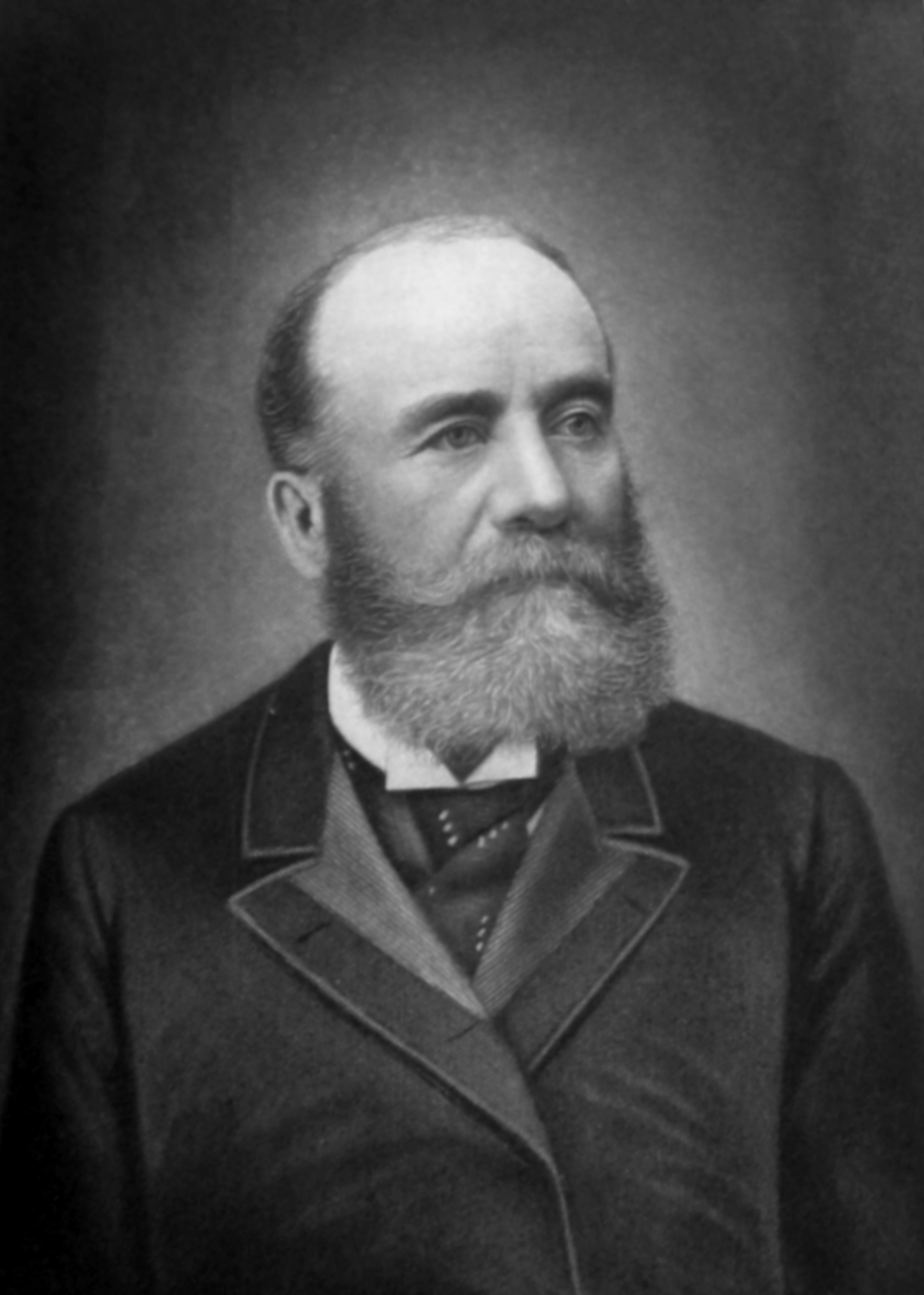
- Born: November 1, 1837; Saint John, New Brunswick, Canada
- Died: February 8, 1905 (aged 67); Riverside, California, US (Note: The majority of sources state that Leary died on February 8. However, several state his date of death as February 9 or February 10.)
- Burial place: Lake View Cemetery
- Occupations: Mayor of Seattle; President of Seattle Metropolitan Chamber of Commerce; President of West Coast Improvement Company; President of Seattle Land & Improvement Company; President of Seattle Warehouse & Elevator Company; President of the Rainier Club
- Years active: 1869–1893
- Known for: Pioneer and civic leader of Seattle, one of Seattle's early mayors, a successful entrepreneur
- Political party: Republican
- Spouses: Mary B. (died 1890); Eliza P. Ferry (married 1892)
- Family: son Mario

Mayor of Seattle
- In office August 3, 1884 – August 3, 1885
- Preceded by: Henry G. Struve
- Succeeded by: Henry Yesler

Signature
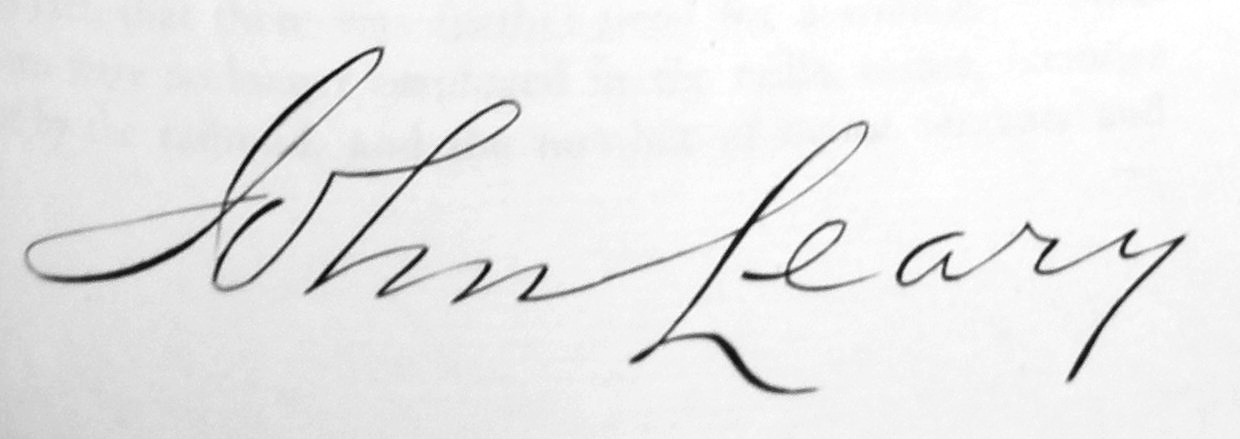

John Leary (November 1, 1837 – February 8, 1905) was an American businessman and politician who was a key civic leader in Seattle, Washington. He made contributions to virtually all civic and business activities during the city's early years.

Leary started as a lumber merchant in New Brunswick, Canada, at 17. A successful entrepreneur, he accumulated "a modest fortune" and traveled to Seattle in 1869 in search of greater opportunities. Leary died one of the richest people in Seattle, with a net worth of $2 million, most of which was acquired through real estate deals in Seattle and vicinity. He participated in many other Seattle projects, including railroads, mining, banking, water and gas works, steamship operations, law, and others. Many of his activities were unprofitable, but served an important public purpose. He was also known for his extensive charitable contributions.

Leary served multiple terms as Seattle councilman and one as Seattle mayor, in 1885. He co-founded the Seattle Chamber of Commerce, Rainier Club, and First National Bank of Seattle, Seattle's first bank. From 1878 to 1890, Leary played one of the most prominent roles in Seattle's battle with the Northern Pacific Railroad for an independent railroad connection—a key element of Seattle's subsequent commercial success and leadership in Washington State.

Leary financed the construction of the steamwheeler Bailey Gatzert, the finest ship in Puget Sound at the time. His mining operation led to the founding of Ravensdale, Washington (initially named for him). Leary's home, the most expensive residence in the city of the time, was listed on the National Register of Historic Places. Two Seattle streets, Leary Way and Leary Avenue, bear his name.

== East Coast career ==
Leary was born on November 1, 1837, to a family of Irish descent, in Saint John, New Brunswick, on the Eastern coast of Canada. He soon demonstrated an "unusual aptitude for business," and at 17, started a successful lumber trading business in the city. This business soon expanded into the town of Woodstock in Carleton County. By the age of 30, he had accumulated a "modest fortune" and ran his own lumber camp on the banks of the Meduxnekeag River.

The Meduxnekeag riverbed spans from the confluence of its North and South Branches near Houlton, Maine in the United States to Woodstock in Canada. The 1866 expiration of the Canadian–American Reciprocity Treaty resulted in substantial losses to Leary's business. Initially, he moved to Houlton in an attempt to run his business from Maine, but soon decided to take his chances on the Western frontier. Leary worked in lumbering until 1867.

== West Coast career ==
In 1869, Leary arrived in Seattle, then a village with unpaved streets supporting a population of less than 1,000 people. Unlike the typical Washington Territory entrepreneur of the time, Leary didn't limit himself to a particular area of business, but engaged in a panoply of activities. In the words of Samuel L. Crawford, a Washingtonian journalist of the time, "Mr. Leary had an unusually active mind and was a great promoter. His great 'stunt' was to start some big enterprise and, after it was well under way, drop out of it himself. In this manner, he fathered many of the big schemes of the day."

As a result, over the next 20 years, Leary was involved in multiple operations simultaneously. He "touched every line of public progress" of Seattle, often at personal loss. Nevertheless, by the beginning of the 20th century, Leary had accumulated a fortune estimated at $2 million ($53,000,000 (Note: The approximate value converted to 2020 dollars, based on a standard adjustment of the 1913 dollar value using the Consumer Price Index as calculated by United States Department of Labor.)), mostly from his investments in Seattle real estate. He died one of the richest people in Seattle.

=== Law practice ===
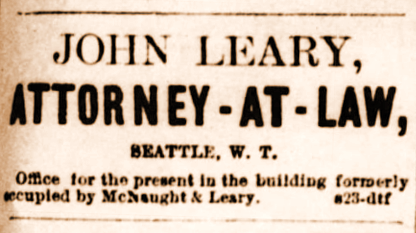
Advertisement for Leary's law practice in The Seattle Post-Intelligencer, 1878.

Leary was admitted to the bar in 1871, becoming a "pioneer lawyer" in Washington Territory. That same year, he became a junior partner in McNaught & Leary law firm. In 1872, McNaught & Leary was one of five law firms in Seattle and one of the six most active law firms in Washington Territory. One of Leary's most consistent occupations in Seattle was law; he was active in this area for eleven years.

In 1878, James F. McNaught became an attorney for the Northern Pacific Railroad Company, and the law firm dissolved. Leary initially started his own law practice, but then formed another firm with Henry G. Struve. The Struve & Leary Company was organized in 1878, and in 1880, when J.C. Haines joined the firm, it was renamed Struve, Haines & Leary. Leary stayed with the firm until 1882, when he left to devote himself to business and civic activities.

=== Mining ===
In 1872, Leary opened the Talbot coal mine (located in present-day Renton) with partners John Collins, James F. McNaught and Michael Padden. Later, Leary was elected one of the venture's directors.

This operation was the first to deliver coal to Seattle. To expose a vein of coal, the company constructed a tunnel 450 feet (140 m) long, 16 feet (4.9 m) wide, and 11 feet (3.4 m) high. To ship the coal to Yesler's Wharf in Seattle, they laid one mile (1,600 m) of railroad track towards the Black River. However, as the bed proved to be badly faulted, the mine closed after a few years.

Between 1878 and 1880, Leary financed several geological expeditions in Washington, which normally would have been financed by local governments, to develop the region. The parties explored the West Coast towards Cape Flattery, the Skagit and Similkameen rivers, and parts of Eastern Washington. The expeditions confirmed the presence of rich coal and iron deposits, and the reports were made available to the public.

In 1884, together with J.M. Colman, Leary took part in the opening of the Cedar River mines. He was also an early stockholder in other mines around Renton.

Leary's most substantial mining effort was the creation of the Leary Coal Company, which developed coal mines in Ravensdale. This mining town was founded by Leary, and initially bore his name. Its original output of 48,000 tons in 1900 increased to 185,000 tons by 1905. The large coal shipments were made possible by a dedicated railroad line financed by other railroad projects with Leary's involvement, and connected the mines to the Northern Pacific Railway. After Leary's death, the mine was sold to Northern Pacific, which maintained a yearly output of 120,000+ tons of coal through 1915, when an accident killed 31 miners and prompted the company to abandon the mines.

=== Utilities ===
Leary organized various ventures that helped build Seattle's infrastructure, often without regard for their potential profitability.

In November 1881, Spring Hill Water Company (earlier purchased by Leary with Jacob Furth and Bailey Gatzert because of its insolvency) was the first to lay water pipes along Seattle streets, pumping water from Lake Washington. This created Seattle's first water system, and by 1886, its capacity reached 200,000 U.S. gallons (760,000 liters). At some point, Leary served as the president of the company. In 1890, he and his partners sold the company to the city for $352,000 ($9,000,000).

Leary also helped organize the city's first gas company, and served as its president until 1878.

=== Banking ===
In September 1882, Leary participated in the founding of Seattle's first bank, the First National Bank of Seattle. (Before 1882, only a loan business founded by Dexter Horton operated in town.) Among Leary's partners in this enterprise were William S. Ladd, a famous banker from Oregon; Henry Yesler, Seattle's richest citizen, C.L. Dingley, G.W. Harris, and J.R. Lewis. The bank opened on November 15, 1882, with $150,000 ($4,000,000) in capital.

The bank's solvency and stability helped the city withstand the Panic of 1893. Leary served as the president of the bank, but later "was obliged to resign … owing to the pressure of his other business interests." First National later merged into Seafirst Bank, which was eventually acquired by the Bank of America.

In 1889, Leary was a member of the board of trustees of the People's Savings Bank in Seattle.

=== Media ===
In 1878, Leary founded the Seattle Post journal. He was the principal owner of the journal from 1880 until 1882 when he engineered a merge with the Seattle Intelligencer. He built the Post building, a new modern office building for the Seattle Post-Intelligencer at a prime location. (Note: Most sources agreed that the merge of the Seattle Post and the Seattle Intelligencer happened in 1882; two later sources recorded 1881 as the year of the merge.) By 1884, Leary had sold all interest in the combined paper.

In 1890, together with several partners, Leary purchased the Seattle Trade Journal, which was established in 1888 by Edmond S. Meany and Alexander Begg. A year later, he sold it to The Seattle Telegraph.

In 1890, Leary was one of the leading stockholders of the Morning Journal Publishing company. That year, the company made an unsuccessful attempt to publish a Democratic Morning Journal, which was absorbed by the Telegraph the following year.

=== Real estate ===
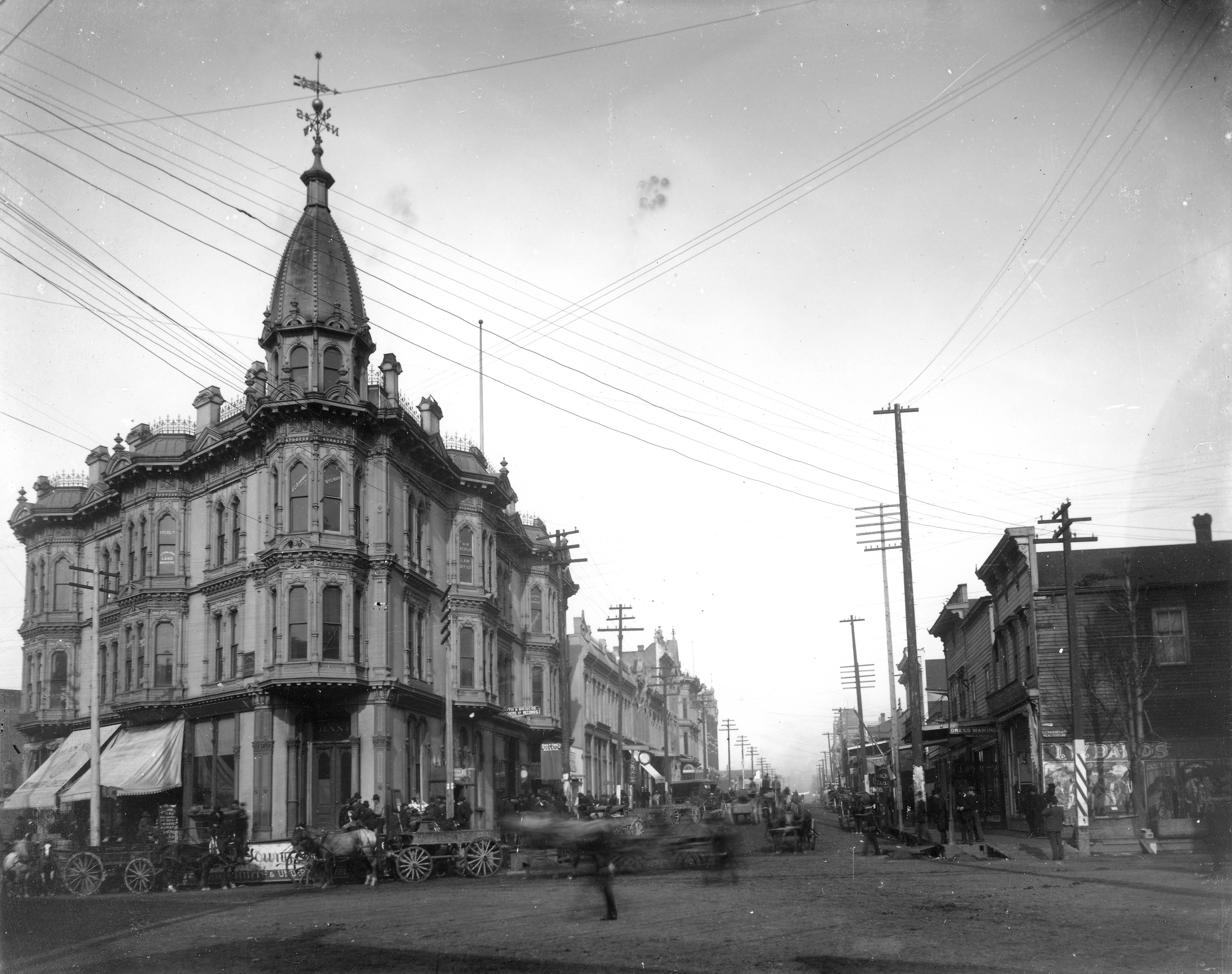
Yesler-Leary Building, 1888

Leary's multiple investments in real estate were based on his firm belief in the future of Washington Territory, and in Seattle in particular. These convictions proved accurate, and his real estate investments became the main source of his accumulated fortune.

For example, in 1883, together with Judge Thomas Burke and William R. Ballard, Leary purchased 700 acres (280 ha) of land on Salmon Bay. Around 1890, it was divided into individual plots and sold to new settlers, forming the city of Ballard (now a suburb of Seattle).

Among Leary's other notable investments were the Cosmopolitan Hotel, the Seattle Post building, and the Yesler-Leary Block. The latter was built in 1883. It was considered the most prestigious piece of commercial real estate and the biggest office building in Seattle at the time. The Yesler-Leary Block had a 108-foot (33 m) long facade facing 1st Avenue and a 73-foot (22 m) facade facing Yesler Way. Constructed in a joint venture with Henry Yesler in 1883 at a cost of over $100,000 ($3,000,000), this office building was destroyed in the Great Seattle Fire on June 6, 1889.

=== Politics and civic activism ===
Like the majority of Washington Territory settlers of the time, Leary was a Republican. His contemporaries described him as an "outstanding civic leader," a "natural leader," and "a pioneer among pioneers."

Leary served three terms as Seattle councilman, in 1873, 1875, and 1876. (Note: One source erroneously stated that Leary served two terms as city councilman.)

In 1884, receiving 1311 votes, he was elected to serve as mayor of Seattle in 1884–1885. Seattle citizens cheered for him during one of the biggest political meetings ever held in Occidental Square. Leary was elected mayor on a ticket created by businessmen in opposition to the Law and Order League. At the time, the League was led by the "moralistic elements," including recently enfranchised women activists who lobbied for liquor and gambling regulations. Later, Leary damaged the relationship with his conservative supporters by allowing raids on saloons and houses of prostitution in attempt to "placate women's and reform groups."

At the time, the position of mayor wasn't salaried, but was regarded as a civic duty. Leary was the first mayor to hold regular office hours. He worked on improving downtown streets, and pleasantly surprised Seattleites by investing his own money to plank 1st Avenue—Seattle's first street-paving project. Leary ran for re-election, but lost.

In late 1885–early 1886, "anti-Chinese agitation" (a result of race antagonism, business depression, and poor enforcement of the Chinese Exclusion Act of 1882) occurred in many Western cities. Many white Americans blamed the business depression of 1882–1885 on cheap Chinese labor, which was considered strong competition to white Americans. The racism turned violent in September, when white laborers attacked Chinese workers causing the Rock Springs massacre followed by an attack in Squak Valley (now Issaquah, Washington). As the agitation reached Seattle, Leary attempted to convince the Chinese to leave the city before any violence had occurred, but he was unsuccessful. Intense anti-Chinese riots rocked Seattle (as many other places on the West Coast), and eventually an "anti-Chinese congress" held in Seattle issued a decree to expel all Chinese people from Western Washington.

In 1890, Leary was an incorporating member of the board of trustees of the Seattle Chamber of Commerce. He served as the Chamber's president for two separate terms, the first being in 1890–1891.

In 1892, during an economic downturn, Leary ran for mayor again on a Republican ticket, but lost to Democrat Judge James T. Ronald.

=== Transportation ===
==== Seattle's first railroads ====
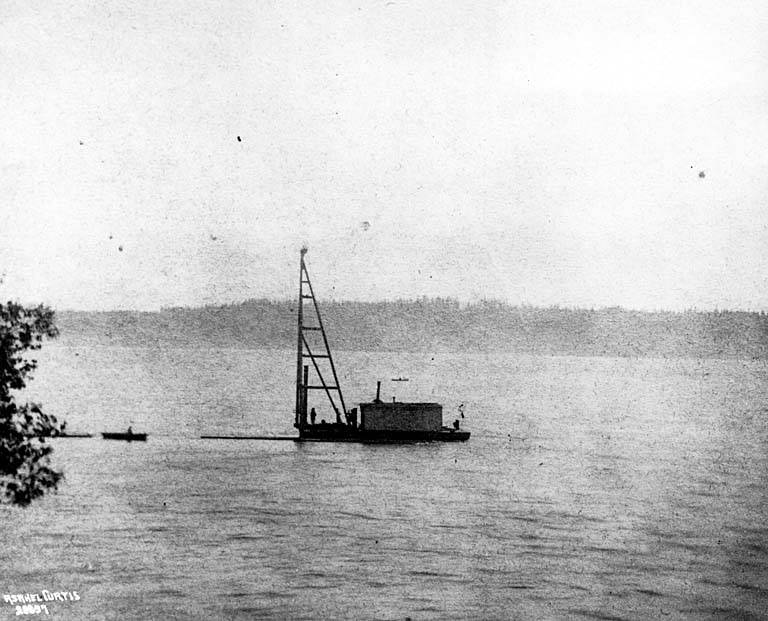
Driving the first pile for Seattle and Walla Walla Railroad, 1874.

The Northern Pacific Railroad was the first transcontinental railroad to reach Puget Sound. After a few years of surveying, in 1873 the railroad unexpectedly decided that Tacoma, not Seattle, would be its western terminus. That decision would direct most commercial traffic to the Port of Tacoma, condemning Seattle to a subservient position in the region. Dependent on commerce, the Seattle population panicked and started planning to relocate their businesses and families to Tacoma.

Leary managed to curtail the panic with a characteristic stunt. He sold one of his hotels for $600 ($16,000) and used the proceedings to purchase a large quantity of piles, sinking them in straight lines along a potential railroad bed leading into Seattle. The resulting illusion of someone building a railroad into Seattle led to multiple rumors that stopped the initial panic, and thus the exodus of people from Seattle.

To resolve the problem in the long term, however, Seattle desperately needed a railroad connection. The situation was exacerbated by the fact that Northern Pacific Railroad had invested massively in Tacoma real estate and was actively luring Seattleites to relocate there.

Leary's stunt led to the establishment of the Seattle and Walla Walla Railroad, which planned to connect Settle to Walla Walla via Snoqualmie Pass and direct at least some commercial traffic into the Port of Seattle. Several prominent citizens backed the project financially, including Arthur Denny, John Collins, Franklin Mathias, Angus Mackintosh, Henry Yesler, James McNaught, J. J. McGilvra, J. M. Colman, and Dexter Horton, but Leary wasn't among the investors. It soon became apparent that Walla Walla had little interest in the project, and Seattleites' resources alone were insufficient (the construction was estimated to cost $4 million ($106,000,000). The construction of the railroad began in 1874, but never went beyond King County.

In 1881, a temporarily leadership change at Northern Pacific led the company to build a connection to Seattle and Walla Walla Railroad at Black River. Service to Seattle began in 1884; however, Northern Pacific continued using its monopoly power in favor of its Tacoma business interests and discriminated against Seattle merchants.

The problem wasn't resolved until Seattle commenced another railroad—Seattle, Lake Shore and Eastern Railway (SLS&E)—which would connect Seattle via Snohomish, Sedro-Woolley, and Sumas to the Canadian Pacific Railway, thus circumventing Northern Pacific entirely. Leary was one of the organizers, incorporators, directors, and investors of SLS&E, but the bulk of the investment came from New York bankers.

Leary played a part in the final battle for Seattle's independent railroad connection. As the construction of SLS&E proceeded in 1885 towards Snohomish, a Tacoma judge issued a writ on behalf of Northern Pacific, ordering Snohomish authorities to stop the construction of the essential Snohomish bridge. An ensuing legal battle would have resulted in a delay, leading to the violation of the financial agreement with New York bankers and thus endangering the entire operation. Along with Judge Thomas Burke, another principal investor in SLS&E, Leary commandeered a SLS&E railroad engine and rushed it to Snohomish. They arrived before the writ did, and convinced the local sheriff and deputies to "disappear for a couple of days" so no one could enforce the writ until the matter could be resolved in court. Putting all available personnel to work, SLS&E completed the bridge on time.

In 1882, Leary was also one of the founders of the Baker City Railway.

==== Maritime transportation ====
In 1877, Leary co-owned the Zephyr with George Harris and Captain William Ballard. In 1879, Leary and Harris sold their shares and Ballard became the sole owner.

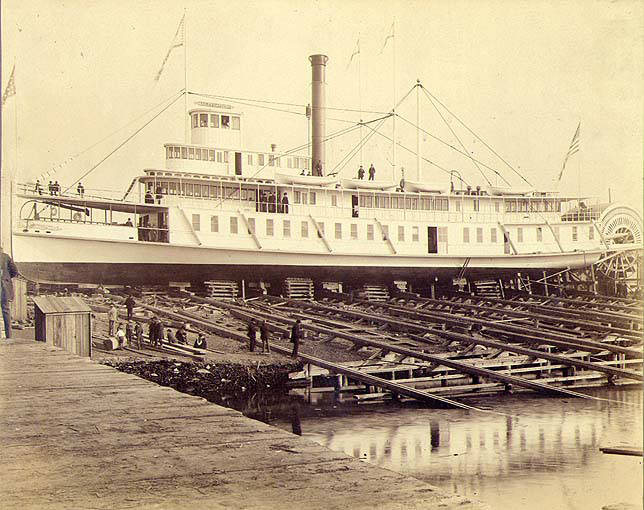
Construction of The Bailey Gatzert, 1890.

With Seattle railroad connections secured, the Port of Seattle experienced a boom of maritime transportation; about $1 million ($26,000,000) worth of new steamers were added to the fleet of companies operating from Seattle in 1890. Leary contributed by organizing the Seattle Steam Navigation & Transportation Company, incorporated with $500,000 ($13,000,000) of capital stock. Leary served as the company's first president alongside other principal investors: Jacob Furth, Edward Neufelder, W.R. Ballard, and H.G. Struve.

Leary built the steamer Bailey Gatzert for SSN&T. One of the finest steamers of her time, it was named after Leary's friend and close business associate Bailey Gatzert, and cost between $100,000 ($2,600,000) and $125,000 ($3,300,000).

In 1891, steamboat operators consolidated into the Columbia River & Puget Sound Navigation Company. The president of the new company was Captain Uriah Bonsor Scott, and Leary became the vice-president. The company owned various steamers, including Telephone, Fleetwood, Flyer and Leary's Bailey Gatzert. They operated between Puget Sound and Victoria, British Columbia.

Leary also played a significant role in organizing the first mail route from Seattle to Alaska.

=== Other activities ===
Leary organized and served as president of the West Coast Improvement Company, Seattle Land & Improvement Company, and the Seattle Warehouse & Elevator Company. He was one of the directors and promoters of the James Street & Broadway Cable & Electric line and of the West Street & North End Electric Railway Company.

Leary was an Irish National League of America governing council member and a member of the University of Washington Board of Regents, lobbying for free education and textbooks for all students.

== Personal life ==
=== Family ===
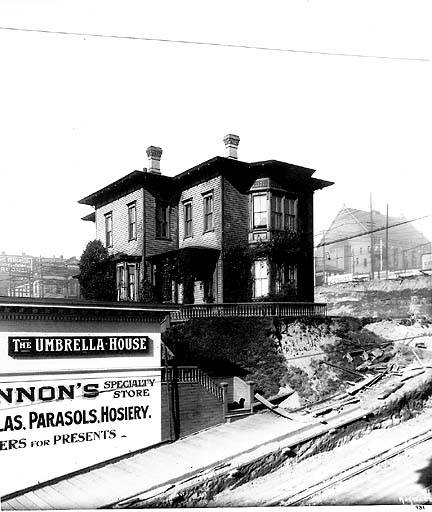
The old Leary family house, 208 Madison Street, Seattle.

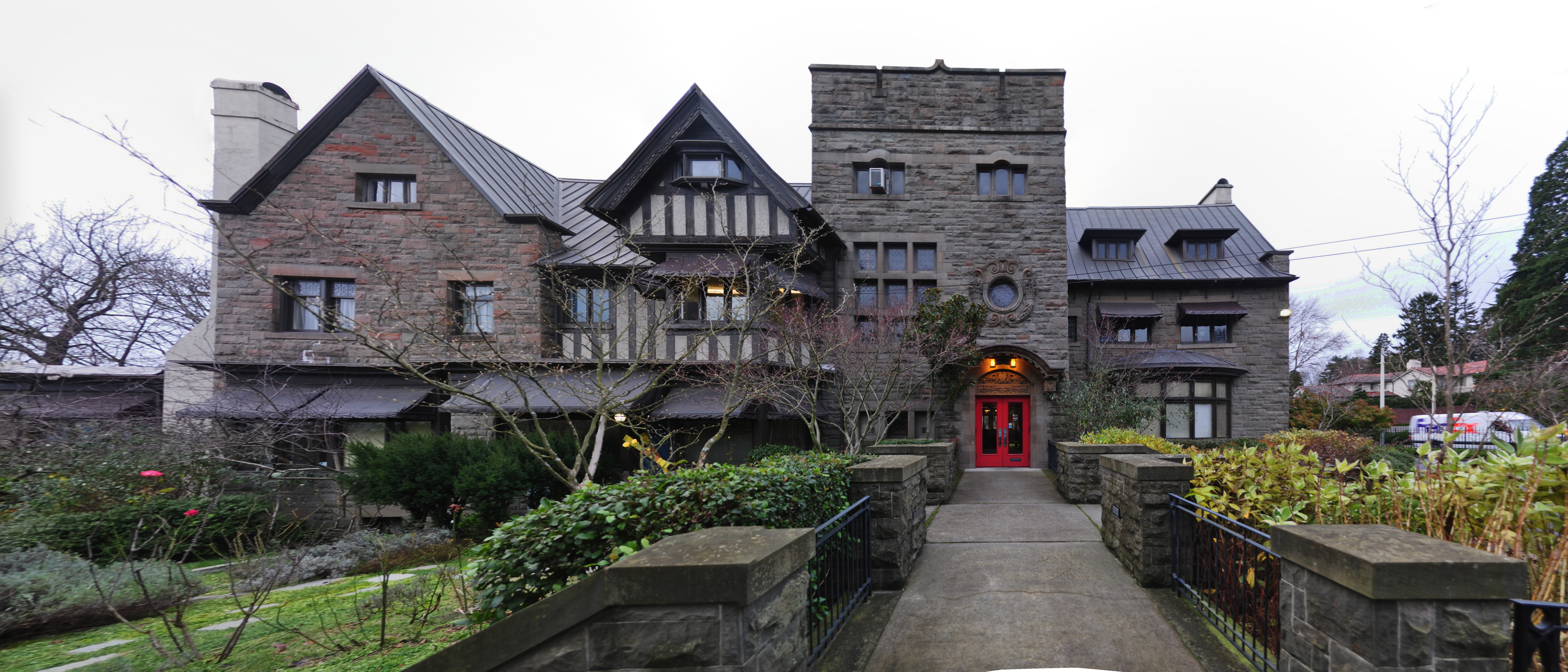
The Leary new family house on Capitol Hill, 1551 10th Avenue East, Seattle.

John Leary was married twice, but had 1 child from his first marriage. He married his first wife, Mary Blanchard, on November 26, 1858, in Littleton, Maine they had a son named Mario born in 1878 and died in 1965. She died on July 17, 1890, in San Francisco, "after a short illness."

On April 21, 1892, Leary married Governor Elisha P. Ferry's daughter, Eliza P. Ferry.

The family resided on the corner of 2nd Avenue and Madison Street. In 1903, Leary started the construction of a new family home at a prime location in Capitol Hill, overlooking Lake Washington. It was estimated to be the most expensive private residence in Seattle at the time. The architects were John Graham (the founder of John Graham & Company, later credited for many historic Seattle landmarks, including the Space Needle) and Arthur Bodley.

The new house wasn't fully completed before Leary's death, but remained the residence of his widow and a famous place for social and charitable gatherings until Eliza Leary's death in 1935. In 1948, the Episcopal Diocese of Olympia purchased the house which remains its headquarters in 2020. The house was added to the National Register of Historic Places in 1972.

At the time of his death, two of Leary's relatives were known to be still living: his sister Margaret (or Maggie) Leary Baker of Philadelphia, and Jane Leary of Fredericton, New Brunswick.

=== Charitable activities ===
Leary was known for a broad spectrum of charitable activities. His associate, Alfred Battle, described Leary as "...the most charitable man I ever knew. He gave money to everybody he thought needed it."

Both of Leary's wives engaged in charitable activities and donated to notable causes. Mary B. Leary was the founder and president of the Ladies Relief Society of Seattle, organized in 1884 to help unfortunate families and individuals. Eliza P. Leary was an active member of Seattle's Sunset Club and a member of the local chapter of the Daughters of the American Revolution.

=== Organizations ===
Leary was among the original founders of the Rainier Club, one of Seattle's most prestigious organizations. He became its president in 1890 and served at least through 1891.

In addition, Leary was an officer in Seattle's chapter of the Royal Arch Masons and a member of a local chapter of Odd Fellows.

=== Death and legacy ===
Leary suffered from liver disease in the last three years of his life. He withdrew from most business activities and spent substantial time in Southern California. He also made two trips to Carlsbad, Germany.

Leary died of heart failure in Riverside, California, on February 8, 1905. His body was transported to Seattle, and his funeral took place on February 15. He was buried at Lake View Cemetery on Capitol Hill.

Leary died one of the wealthiest people in Seattle, leaving a fortune valued at $2 million ($53,000,000). It was left almost entirely to his wife, Eliza. A Seattle street, Leary Way, was named after him.

== Literature cited ==
- "CPI Inflation Calculator", Bureau of Labor Statistics, Washington: United States Department of Labor
- "Police Court", Saint John Morning Freeman, vol. XVIII, no. 5, Saint John, p. 3, February 13, 1868, ISSN 1186-4524, OCLC 1007188516
- "The last rally", Seattle Post-Intelligencer, Seattle: Leigh S. J. Hunt, p. 3, July 13, 1884, ISSN 2379-7304, LCCN sn83045604, OCLC 9563195
- "The vote canvassed", Seattle Post-Intelligencer, Seattle: Leigh S. J. Hunt, p. 2, July 25, 1884, ISSN 2379-7304, LCCN sn83045604, OCLC 9563195
- "Died", San Francisco Call, San Francisco: John D. Spreckles, p. 8, July 19, 1890, ISSN 1946-6145, LCCN sn94052989, OCLC 32040317
- "Brief locals", Victoria Daily Times, Victoria, p. 7, July 19, 1890, ISSN 0839-430X, LCCN cn88031658, OCLC 911754661
- "To Beat The Steamer Combine", Seattle Post-Intelligencer, Seattle: Leigh S. J. Hunt, p. 16, August 24, 1890, ISSN 2379-7304, LCCN sn83045604, OCLC 9563195
- "New railway franchise", Seattle Post-Intelligencer, Seattle: Leigh S. J. Hunt, p. 6, May 8, 1900, ISSN 2379-7304, LCCN sn83045604, OCLC 9563195
- "Seattle pioneer passes away", Spokane Chronicle, Spokane: Cowles Company, p. 5, February 8, 1905, LCCN sn86072020, OCLC 14374699
- "John Leary passes away", The Seattle Star, vol. 6, no. 302, Seattle: E. W. Scripps, p. 1, February 8, 1905, ISSN 2159-5577, LCCN sn87093407, OCLC 17285351
- "Dies far from home", Seattle Post-Intelligencer, Seattle: Leigh S. J. Hunt, pp. 1, 9, February 9, 1905, ISSN 2379-7304, LCCN sn83045604, OCLC 9563195
- Blethen, Alden J., ed. (February 10, 1905), "Home that represented the last great ambition of John Leary", Seattle Daily Times, Seattle: The Seattle Times Company, p. 4, ISSN 2639-4898, LCCN sn86072007, OCLC 1765328
- Blethen, Alden J., ed. (February 13, 1905), "Body Will Arrive Tonight: Chamber of Commerce Prepares Program for Memorial to John Leary", Seattle Daily Times, Seattle: The Seattle Times Company, p. 3, ISSN 2639-4898, LCCN sn86072007, OCLC 1765328
- Blethen, Alden J., ed. (February 14, 1905), "Fortune left to Mrs. John Leary", Seattle Daily Times, Seattle: The Seattle Times Company, pp. 1, 15, ISSN 2639-4898, LCCN sn86072007, OCLC 1765328
- Blethen, Alden J., ed. (February 15, 1905), "Editorial notes", Seattle Daily Times, Seattle: The Seattle Times Company, p. 4, ISSN 2639-4898, LCCN sn86072007, OCLC 1765328
- Revels Cayton, Susie, ed. (February 17, 1905), "John Leary's demise", Seattle Republican, Seattle: Republican Pub. Co., p. 4, ISSN 2157-3271, LCCN sn84025811, OCLC 10328970
- Blethen, Alden J., ed. (February 25, 1905), "John Leary Will Probated", Seattle Daily Times, Seattle: The Seattle Times Company, p. 7, ISSN 2639-4898, LCCN sn86072007, OCLC 1765328
- White, James Terry, ed. (1936), "John Leary", The National cyclopædia of American biography, vol. XXV, New York: James T. White & Company, pp. 277–278, LCCN 86643436, OCLC 2510562
- Bagley, Clarence B. (1916), History of Seattle: From the Earliest Settlement to the Present Time, Chicago: S. J. Clarke Publishing Company, LCCN 16011408, OCLC 7372062
- Benton, Homer G. (April 1, 1964), "Seattle Terminal Railway", The Railway and Locomotive Historical Society Bulletin (110), Boston: Railway & Locomotive Historical Society: 66–71, ISSN 0033-8842, JSTOR 43518102, LCCN a22001212, OCLC 1763394
- Brazier, Dorothy Brant (April 28, 1963), "Rainier club brought sophistication to frontier Seattle", Seattle Daily Times, Seattle: The Seattle Times Company, p. 128, ISSN 2639-4898, LCCN sn86072007, OCLC 1765328
- Brown, Larry (May 27, 1984), "The Leary legacy", Seattle Daily Times, Seattle: The Seattle Times Company, pp. 228, 229, ISSN 2639-4898, LCCN sn86072007, OCLC 1765328
- Conover, C. T. (September 10, 1949), "The Irish are important in Seattle's history", Seattle Daily Times, Seattle: The Seattle Times Company, p. 4, ISSN 2639-4898, LCCN sn86072007, OCLC 1765328
- Conover, C. T. (October 12, 1958), "Just cogitating: Seattle's First Bank was established in 1882", Seattle Daily Times, Seattle: The Seattle Times Company, p. 150, ISSN 2639-4898, LCCN sn86072007, OCLC 1765328
- Conover, C. T. (February 8, 1960), "J. T. Ronald served as mayor during economic panic of 1893", Seattle Daily Times, Seattle: The Seattle Times Company, p. 39, ISSN 2639-4898, LCCN sn86072007, OCLC 1765328
- Duncon, Don (March 1, 1980), "Lake View: a place of history, a place of beauty", Seattle Daily Times, Seattle: The Seattle Times Company, p. 14, ISSN 2639-4898, LCCN sn86072007, OCLC 1765328
- Evans, George Watkin (1912), The Coal Fields of King County (PDF), Bulletin, vol. 3, Olympia: Washington Geological Survey, LCCN gs12000641, OCLC 150445739
- Grant, Frederic James (1891), History of Seattle, Washington with Illustration and Biographical Sketches of Some of Its Prominent Men and Pioneers, Western Americana, New York: American Publishing and Engraving Co, LCCN 05016865, OCLC 2617374
- Haigh, John (November 15, 1964), "Joshua Green's first hill home", Seattle Daily Times, Seattle: The Seattle Times Company, pp. 193, 194, ISSN 2639-4898, LCCN sn86072007, OCLC 1765328
- Hanford, Cornelius (1924), Seattle and Environs 1852-1924, vol. 1, Chicago: Pioneer Historical Publishing Company, OCLC 3494902
- Hines, Harvey Kimball (1893), An Illustrated History of the State of Washington, Chicago: The Lewis Publishing Company, LCCN rc01000322, OCLC 1104881358
- Hunt, Herbert; Kaylor, Floyd C. (1917), Washington, west of the Cascades; historical and descriptive; the explorers, the Indians, the pioneers, the modern, Chicago: S. J. Clarke Publishing Company, LCCN 18015511, OCLC 10086413
- Jones, Nard (1972), Seattle, Garden City: Doubleday, ISBN 0385018754, LCCN 72079397, OCLC 988183419
- LeWarne, Charles P. (1999), "John Leary", in Garraty, John A.; Carnes, Mark C. (eds.), American National Biography, vol. 13, Oxford: Oxford University Press, pp. 333–334, ISBN 0195206355, LCCN 98020826, OCLC 468280018
- McDonald, Norbert (January 1, 1959), Gates, Charles M. (ed.), "The Business Leaders of Seattle, 1880–1910", Pacific Northwest Quarterly, 50 (1), Seattle: University of Washington: 1–13, ISSN 0030-8803, JSTOR 40487337, LCCN 08030966, OCLC 2392232
- Schwantes, Carlos Arnaldo (1999), Long day's journey: the steamboat & stagecoach era in the northern West, Seattle: University of Washington Press, ISBN 0295976918, LCCN 99029316, OCLC 466655517
- Snowden, Clinton A. (1909), Hanford, Cornelius; Moore, Miles Conway; Tyler, William D.; Chadwick, Stephen J. (eds.), History of Washington: The Rise and Progress of an American State, New York: The Century History Company, LCCN 09028416, OCLC 2827985
- Stein, Alan J. (January 1, 2000), Rousso, Nick (ed.), "Spring Hill Water Company is incorporated in Seattle on August 20, 1881", historylink.org, Seattle: HistoryLink, OCLC 124224498
- Tate, Cassandra (September 2, 2004), Rousso, Nick (ed.), "Voters elect businessman John Leary as mayor of the City of Seattle on July 14, 1884", historylink.org, Seattle: HistoryLink, OCLC 124224498
- Tate, Cassandra (March 5, 2009), Rousso, Nick (ed.), "Weekly Intelligencer, a precursor of the Seattle Post-Intelligencer, publishes its first edition on August 5, 1867", historylink.org, Seattle: HistoryLink, OCLC 124224498
- Wright, Don (February 2, 1967), "Times Troubleshooter", Seattle Daily Times, Seattle: The Seattle Times Company, p. 52, ISSN 2639-4898, LCCN sn86072007, OCLC 1765328
