= Jacob Furth =

American banker and businessman

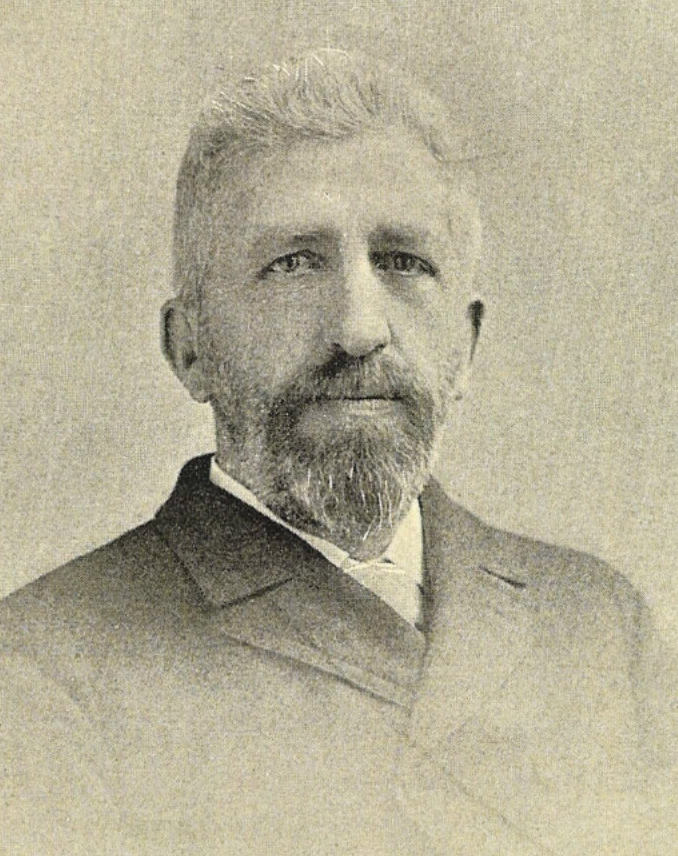
Jacob Furth (circa 1900)

Jacob Furth (November 15, 1840 – June 2, 1914) was an Austrian Empire-born American entrepreneur and prominent Seattle banker. He played a key role in consolidating Seattle's electric power and public transportation infrastructure, and was a member of Ohaveth Sholum Congregation, Seattle's first synagogue. Bill Speidel called him "the city's leading citizen for thirty years," adding that Furth "may even have been the most important citizen Seattle ever had."

Clarence Bagley wrote shortly after Furth's death:

... while Jacob Furth was masterful, commanding and dynamic in his business affairs, he regarded business as but one phase of existence, and he was not less the public-spirited citizen and the philanthropist than he was the successful financier. Indeed, there was no period in all of his career when business so occupied his attention that he would not turn to listen to some plan for the city's betterment or some tale whereby his personal aid was sought for an individual or an organization.

== Early life ==
Furth was born in Schwihau, Bohemia (now Švihov, Czech Republic) November 15, 1840, the son of Lazar and Anna (Popper) Furth, Jewish natives of Bohemia. Of their ten sons and two daughters, eight eventually came to America. He attended school to the age of thirteen years, then began a career as a confectioner in Budapest. He decided at sixteen (so says Bagley; other sources say 18) to try his fortune in America and made his way to San Francisco, arriving in 1856.

He had with him letters of introduction to the Schwabacher Brothers, a prominent Jewish pioneer merchant family firm. After his arrival, he used his last ten dollars to get to Nevada City, California, where the Schwabachers had secured him a position. He clerked mornings and evenings in a clothing store, while attending public schools for about six months to improve his English. When the Schwabachers checked on him after six months, his English was already better than theirs.

He was rapidly promoted, and at the end of three years he was receiving a salary of $US300 per month. He lived frugally, and invested some of his money in a quicksilver mine. By the time the Nevada City store burned in 1862, he had saved enough to open his own clothing and dry-goods store in Shingle Springs, California. Eight years later, in 1870, he moved Colusa, California, where he bought into a general mercantile store. The Schwabachers offered him financing, but he told them he had already saved enough to do this on his own. Shortly after his arrival in Colusa, he became Freemason and eventually became master of his lodge. (He would remain a Mason in Seattle.) In 1878, he was able to buy out the older partners in the store, which he owned and operated until 1882.

== Banking and financial positions ==
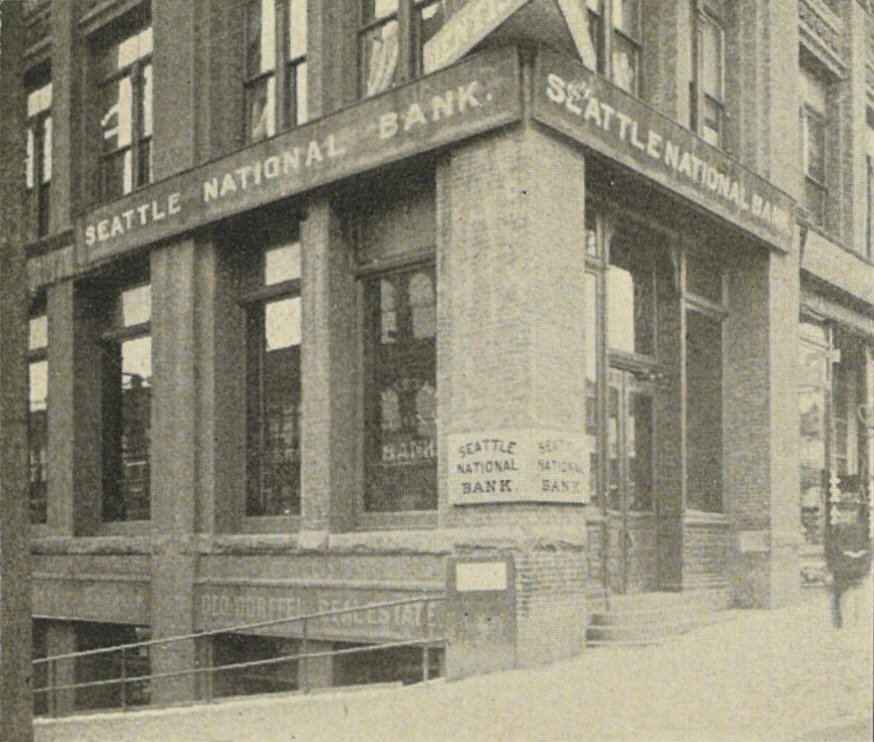
Seattle National Bank in 1900. This building stood at the northwest corner of Second Avenue and Columbia Street in Seattle, since 1959 the site of the Bauhaus-style Norton Building.

In 1882, health problems took Furth to the Puget Sound region in Washington. There, in cooperation with the Schwabachers he helped organize the Puget Sound National Bank with a capital of fifty thousand dollars, and took charge as its cashier. Former Seattle mayor Bailey Gatzert, another Schwabacher associate, was the original bank president. The bank officially opened for business in August 1883. For several months, Furth was the bank's only employee and its only officer in Seattle.

Puget Sound National Bank succeeded and prospered; at all times the earnings of the bank were sufficient to increase the capital stock as needed. In 1893 he became bank president, a role he held until his bank's consolidation with the Seattle National Bank in 1910, after which he became chairman of the board of directors of the latter. Bagley writes, "He became recognized as one of the foremost factors in banking circles in the northwest, thoroughly conversant with every phase of the business and capable of solving many intricate and complex financial problems."

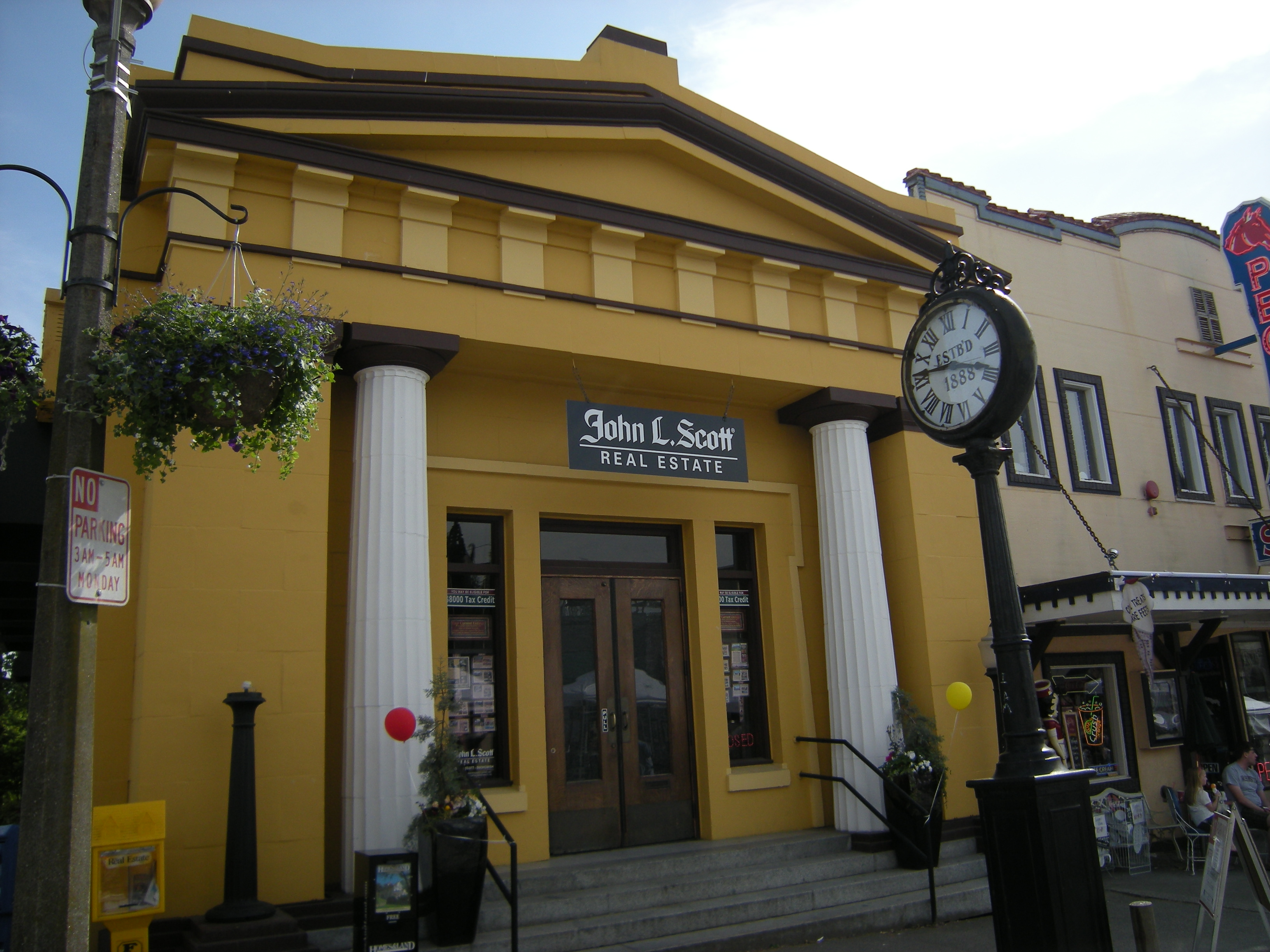
The former First National Bank of Snohomish building, built 1907.

Besides the Puget Sound National Bank, he organized the First National Bank of Snohomish in 1896 and remained one of its stockholders and directors the rest of his life. He also founded or co-founded several other Washington State banks, including the Kitsap County Bank in Port Orchard, Washington (1908), still active today as the Kitsap Bank. In 1884 he organized the California Land & Stock Company, owning a 14,000-acre (5,700 ha) farm in Lincoln County, Washington, one of the state's largest. Most of the farm was used to raise wheat; it also pastured cattle and horses. This was another company of which Furth would continue as president until his death. He also invested in property, including Seattle real estate and Pacific Northwest timber lands.

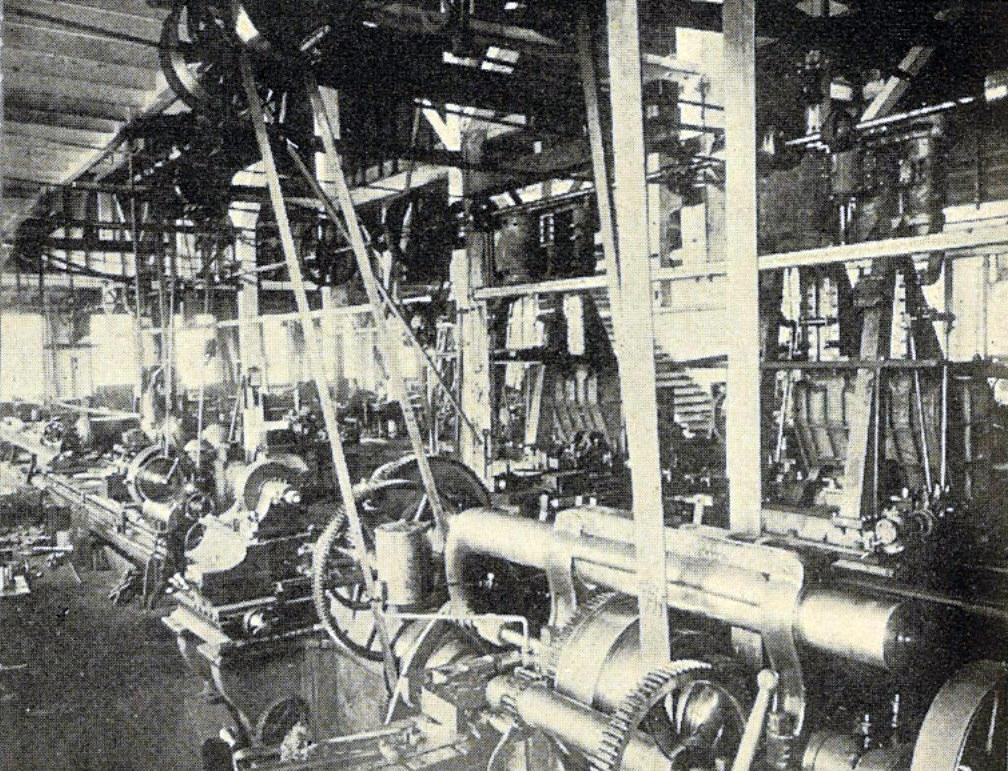
Vulcan Iron Works, 1900.

Further, Furth became increasingly involved in the building and management of urban and interurban electric railway systems. In 1900, backed by Stone & Webster he became president of the Seattle Electric Company (later Puget Power, merged in 1997 into Puget Sound Energy), which in 1916 operated more than 100 miles (160 km) of track. He aided in organizing and became the president of the Puget Sound Electric Railway in 1902, controlling the line between Seattle and Tacoma, Washington and also owning the street railways in Tacoma and most other Puget Sound cities and towns. He was also president of Seattle's Vulcan Iron Works, which he organized in 1887. One of Seattle's first major industrial operations, it covered an entire Seattle city block at Fifth Avenue and Lane Street in what is now the International District, Seattle's Chinatown.

== Public-minded dealmaker ==
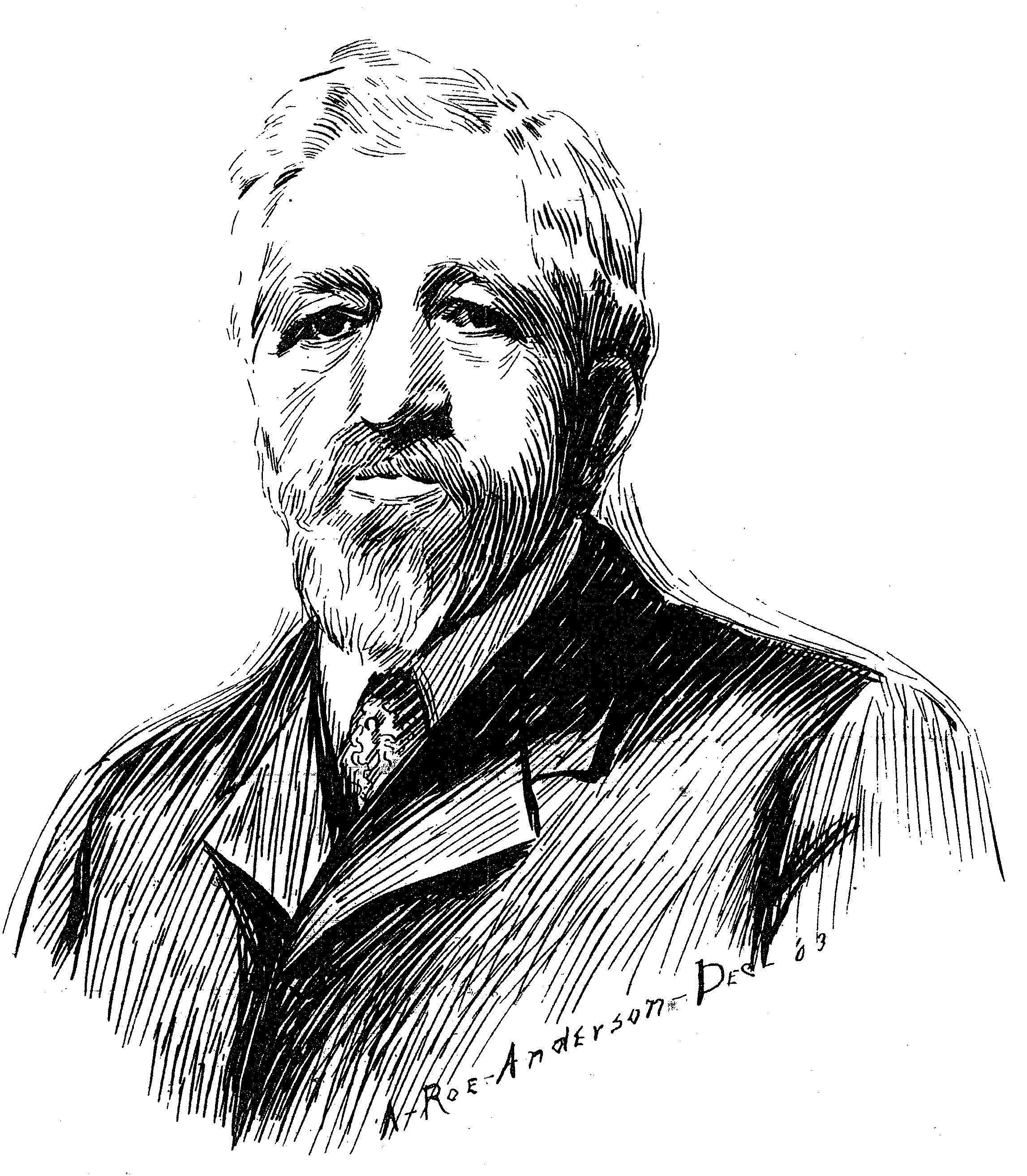
1903 portrait of Furth by A. Roe Anderson

In eulogizing Furth, Judge Thomas Burke said of him,

Jacob Furth was an unusual man. To exceptional ability he united a high order of public spirit and great kindness of heart. It would be difficult to overestimate his work in the upbuilding of Seattle. His time, his strength and his money were always at the call of the city. In his many years of residence I doubt if he were ever once called upon for help or leadership in any public matter in which he failed to respond and respond cheerfully, liberally and with genuine public spirit.

Some seventy years later, Bill Speidel was more succinct: "All Jacob Furth did was take a squalid little village named Seattle and turn it into a world class city. He made good on Doc Maynard's dream."

Shortly after his arrival in Seattle, Furth (along with Gatzert and Seattle Post-Intelligencer founder John Leary) rescued the Spring Hill Water system from bankruptcy. The privately owned firm supplied the city's water. A new pumping station on Lake Washington in what is now the Mount Baker neighborhood made the system viable, doubling its previous capacity. Although the deal was initially viewed largely as a matter of public service, Furth's financial acumen resulted in a profit. After the Great Seattle Fire of June 6, 1889, which the Spring Hill system failed to put out, Furth broke with most of the city's business interests to back city engineer R. H. Thomson's proposal for a municipally owned gravity-flow system. J.J. McGilvra was the only other member of the Seattle establishment to take this side in the fight.

Furth assembled $150 million in bank loans after the Great Seattle Fire, and promised that his bank would make no effort to profit from the fire. In the Panic of 1893, he dissuaded the directors of his Seattle National Bank from calling in all loans. "What you propose," he said, "may be good banking, but it is not human." A rapid trip to New York City secured enough capital to buy control of the bank and weather the crisis.

== Financing of shipping and railroads ==
Shortly after the Great Seattle Fire, Furth financed seaman Joshua Green in acquiring his first vessel, the Fannie Lake (or Fanny Lake); Green would eventually consolidate the Puget Sound Mosquito Fleet and center it at Seattle, a major factor in Seattle's rise to regional preeminence, and later became a banker himself. Furth arranged financing for Green's first shipping firm, the La Conner Trading and Transportation Company, as well as another successful steamboat line, the Anderson Steamboat Company.

Furth worked with both the E.H. Harriman and James J. Hill interests to bring their respective railroads to Seattle, finally bringing Seattle the transcontinental rail connection it had sought for decades.

== Stone & Webster ==
Furth's work with Stone & Webster—to consolidate the city's public transportation system and to consolidate and develop electrical power sources to power them—was more controversial. In the 1890s, Seattle had fourteen independent streetcar and cable car lines; all but J.J. McGilvra's line on Madison Street eventually failed financially, most of them in the wake of the Panic of 1893. Most of them survived only by funding operations out of what should have been maintenance capital. Working with Stone & Webster, Furth stitched together a single system, the Seattle Electric Company and—under pressure from the Seattle City Council, in order to gain the franchise—established a flat fare, initially 5 cents including transfers (previously, a single trip could have cost as much as 40 cents). In 1902, this was expanded with Interurbans to Tacoma and Renton.

However, in contrast to the post-Fire investment that had so clearly been for the common good of the city, Seattle Electric was a for-profit, private undertaking, owned largely by East Coast interests. This put Furth in direct conflict with the advocates of local public ownership. Furthermore, the consolidation of the streetcar lines did not solve the maintenance issues, with "overcrowding, erratic service, accidents, [and] open cars even in winter" remaining common.

The City of Seattle had been involved in municipal power generation since the 1890 creation of the Department of Lighting and Water Works. The 1902 election saw strong populist support for public power, leading to the establishment of Seattle City Light and the city's involvement in hydroelectricity. For the next half-century, Seattle would be variously served by municipal electricity and by Seattle Electric and its successors, until the city bought out its private competitor in 1951.

== Lou Graham connection ==
According to Bill Speidel, brothel-owner Lou Graham was effectively Furth's silent partner from her 1888 arrival in Seattle until her death in 1903. He provided the banking, real estate, and political connections she required to establish the city's leading parlor house; when people came to him seeking a loan, and he thought their idea was good but that he'd never get it past his board of directors, he referred them to Graham for an informal, high-interest loan. She may have been instrumental in saving Puget Sound National Bank from a bank run during the Panic of 1893, by ostentatiously making a large deposit. When she died, a Puget Sound National Bank employee became administrator of her estate.

== The Schricker scandal ==
Toward the end of his life, Furth's reputation was somewhat tarnished by a scandal related to a bank in La Conner, Washington, although Furth was posthumously acquitted of all culpability.

W.E. Schricker's private bank in La Conner failed in 1912 with $378,766.91 in debts and less than $200,000 in assets. Schricker blamed Furth and other officers of Furth's bank; Furth was arrested, lampooned in the press, and convicted by a jury on April 18, 1913, and fined $10,000. Schricker accused Furth of recommending that he continue to take deposits even after he knew his bank was in trouble. The prosecutor amplified this with a charge that Furth had done so to keep Schricker's bank going just long enough to pay notes due to Furth's bank, thereby harming other depositors. However, Furth was unaware that Schricker had made $348,554.83 in self-dealing loans to the Fidalgo Lumber Company of Anacortes, Washington, of which Schricker was a partner. In other words, most of the bank's debts could be accounted for by Schricker's failure to collect from himself.

The conviction was completely overturned on appeal, December 18, 1914, but by that time Furth was not alive to see his reputation cleared.

== Civic associations and public office ==
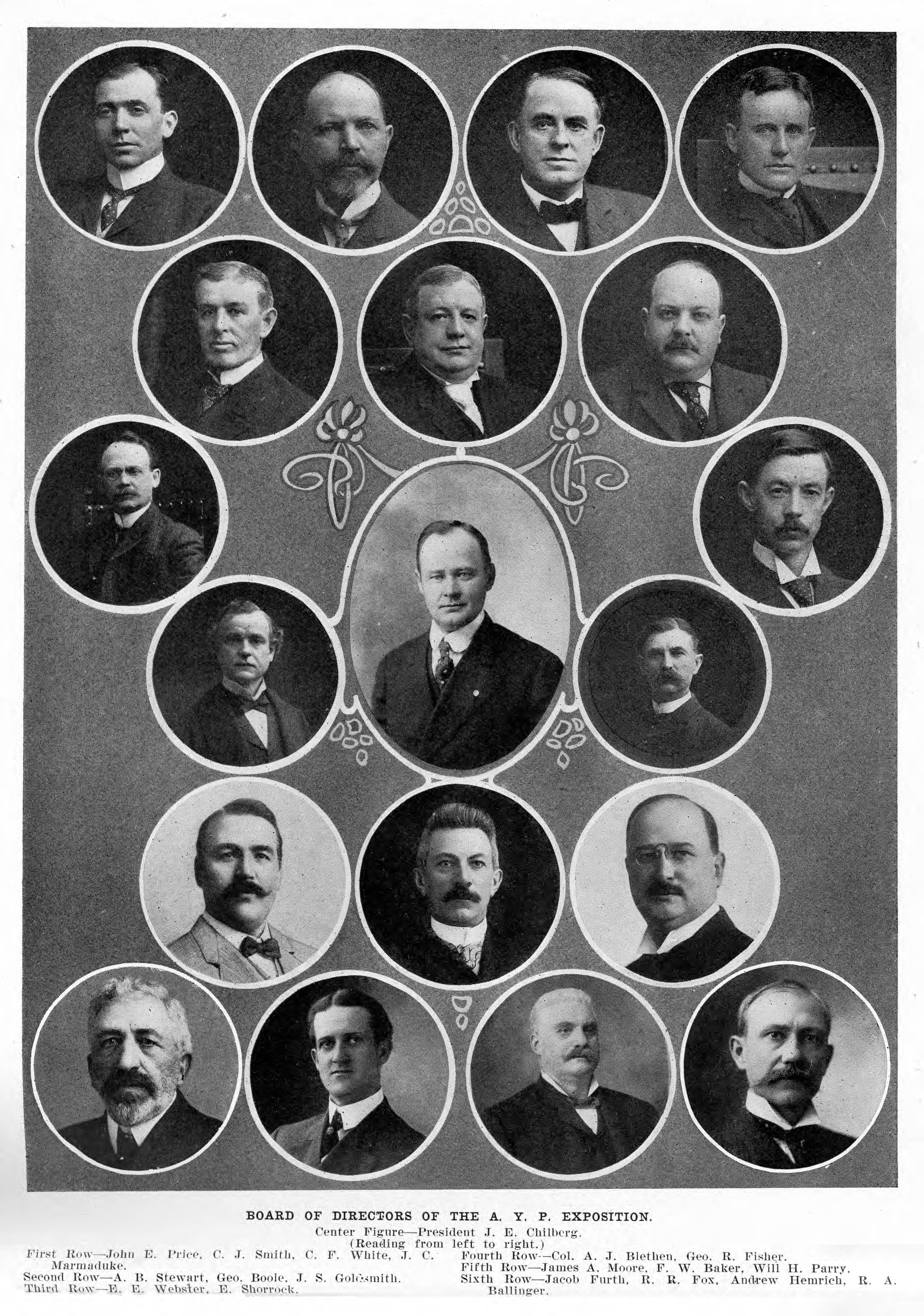
Furth, lower left, as a member of the board of directors of the Alaska-Yukon-Pacific Exposition.

Among other associations, Furth was a member of Seattle's prestigious Rainier Club and the Seattle Chamber of Commerce. He was a two-term president of the Chamber. He served as a Republican on the Seattle City Council from 1885 until 1891. In 1901 he was the key organizer of Seattle's anti-union Citizens' Alliance. He also played a key role in fundraising for the Alaska-Yukon-Pacific Exposition.

== Marriage and family ==
In California, in 1865, Furth married Lucy (or Lucia) A. Dunton, a native of Indiana from what Lee Micklin characterizes as "an early American family"; they eventually had three daughters: Jane E., Anna F., and Sidonia. In 1884, Lucy Furth, along with Babette Gatzert (wife of Bailey Gatzert, and herself born a member of the Schwabacher family) founded the Ladies Relief Society (now Seattle Children's Home). It was Seattle's first charity.

Although he married a Gentile, Furth remained a practicing Jew. He belonged to the "quasi-reform" Ohaveth Sholum Congregation, Seattle's first synagogue, and later to the Reform Temple de Hirsch, one of the congregations that merged into the present-day Temple de Hirsch-Sinai.

Furth's daughter Jane married E.L. Terry. Anna married Frederick K. Struve, a Seattle financier and son of Seattle mayor Henry G. Struve. His daughter Sidonia married a U.S. Army colonel named Wetherill; the Wetherills inherited the Furth family summer estate at Yarrow Point on the east shore of Lake Washington. The bulk of this estate, 16 acres (6.5 ha) was deeded to the towns of Yarrow Point and Hunts Point as the Wetherill Nature Preserve on July 4, 1988.
