= Edward Carlson =

American hotel and airline executive

Edward Elmer Carlson
- Born: June 4, 1911; Tacoma, Washington
- Died: April 3, 1990 (aged 78); Seattle, Washington, United States
- Education: Lincoln High School (Seattle, Washington); University of Washington 1928-30
- Board member of: president, Western International 1961-1969; president, UAL 1971-79; Chairman, United Airlines 1979-90 president, Pacific Science Center Foundation president, American Hotel and Motel Association director, Seattle-First National Bank trustee, Virginia Mason Hospital trustee, Seattle Symphony Orchestra; Seattle Chamber of Commerce; Seattle First National Bank; General American Insurance Corporation; Virginia Mason Association; Seattle Central Association; Trust Houses Group in London; University of Washington Board of Regents and others
- Spouse: Nell Hinckley Cox (June 26, 1936)
- Children: Edward Eugene Carlson (b. 1940); Jane Leslie Wiliams (b. 1942)
- Parent(s): Elmer E. and Lula (Powers) Carlson
- Relatives: Margaret Carlson, ex daughter-in-law
- Awards: Horatio Alger Award, 1975; U. Washington's Alumnus Summa Laude Dignatus, 1970; Seattle-King County Municipal League Outstanding Citizen, 1970; Seattle-King County Association of Realtors First Citizen of 1965

Edward Carlson (June 4, 1911 – April 3, 1990), was an American hotel and airline executive, and Seattle, Washington civic leader.

Carlson was born in Tacoma, Washington. As a youth, he helped his single mother make ends meet by working as a gas station attendant, as well as other odd jobs. Carlson entered the University of Washington in 1928 and, while a student, began his hotel career as a pageboy, then an elevator operator, then a bellhop. He dropped out of college in 1930, lacking funds. He worked half a year as a seaman, then worked a summer job at Mount Baker Lodge, and beginning in autumn 1931 traveled the country in an unsuccessful stint as a salesman for a device that mechanically blocked (shaped) felt hats. Returning to Seattle, he resumed hotel work, first as a room clerk and then as assistant manager of Seattle's Roosevelt Hotel, next as manager of the President Hotel in Mount Vernon, Washington. On June 26, 1936, he married Nell H. Cox.

In April 1937, Carlson returned to Seattle to manage the Rainier Club, Seattle's preeminent private club." He retained the position until joining the Navy in 1942. At that time the club awarded him a military membership, which became a regular membership upon his return from World War II.

Carlson finished World War II as a Lieutenant Commander in the Navy Supply Corps, having served in Seattle and then in Mechanicsburg, Pennsylvania

Returning from the war, he took a position as assistant to S. W. Thurston, president of Western Hotels, Inc. (later Western International Hotels, then Westin Hotels). Within a year he had been named vice president, then became successively executive vice president (1953), president (1960), and finally chairman and CEO (1969). Westin merged with United Airlines in 1970, and Carlson became CEO of the newly formed company, UAL Corporation, a position he held from 1971–1979. In his first two years, he turned the nearly bankrupt airline profitable.

Carlson is credited with bringing the 1962 World's Fair—the Century 21 Exposition—to Seattle. His napkin sketch of the tower with a revolving restaurant on top, inspired by the Stuttgart Tower, was the origin of the Space Needle. Harvard Business School named Carlson one of the great business leaders of the twentieth century.

Carlson was (along with Henry Broderick) one of the two leaders of the successful 1948 initiative that re-legalized the sale of liquor by the drink in Washington State.

== Edward E. Carlson Leadership and Public Service Center ==
In 1992, a gift from the Carlson family founded the Carlson Leadership and Public Service Center at the University of Washington (U.W.). "Since its inception, the Center has worked with faculty to extend classroom learning, help students make meaningful contributions to the community and promote the development of effective citizens and leaders. Through the Carlson Center each year, hundreds of U.W. students engage in public service."

== Personal ==
The Carlsons had two children, Gene and Janie. Carlson remained close to his former daughter-in-law Margaret Carlson even after the divorce.

== Awards and honors ==
- Horatio Alger Award, 1975
- Golden Plate Award of the American Academy of Achievement, 1972
- University of Washington's Alumnus Summa Laude Dignatus Award, 1970
- Seattle-King County Municipal League Outstanding Citizen, 1970
- Seattle-King County Association of Realtors First Citizen, 1965
