= Weed identification =

Weed identification may relate to

- History of plant systematics, the classification of plants
- Botany, the study of plants
- Taxonomy, the classification of living things
- Weed plant science
- Weed (disambiguation)
