= Lou Graham (disambiguation) =

Lou Graham (1938–2026) was an American golfer.

Lou Graham may also refer to:

- Lou Graham (Seattle madame) (1857–1903), Seattle brothel owner

== See also ==
- Louis E. Graham (1880–1965), American politician
- Lou Gramm (born 1950), American singer-songwriter
