= Weed (surname) =

Weed is a surname. It may refer to:

== People ==
- Abner Weed (1842–1917), American politician and Civil War soldier, namesake of Weed, California
- Adaline Weed (1837–1910), American hydropathic medicine practitioner and women's rights activist
- Alex Weed (born 1980), American actor
- Alfred Cleveland Weed (1881–1953), American ichthyologist
- Barrett Wilbert Weed (born 1988), American actress and singer
- Bobby Weed (born 1955), American golf course designer and builder
- Charles Weed (born 1943), American politician
- Charles Leander Weed (1824–1903), American photographer
- Cindy Weed, American politician
- Clarence Weed (1885–1966), American college football and college basketball coach
- Elizabeth Weed (born 1940), American feminist scholar, editor and university administrator
- Ella Weed (1853–1894), American educator
- Ethel Weed (1906–1975), American military officer who advocated for the rights of Japanese women during the Allied occupation of Japan
- George L. Weed (1857–1916), American politician
- George S. Weed (1862–1919), American lawyer and politician
- Gideon A. Weed (1833–1905), American doctor and mayor of Seattle
- Harold Weed (born 1962), American visual and special effects artist
- Helena Hill Weed (1875–1958), American suffragist and geologist
- Henry I. Weed (1861–1945), American lawyer, military officer, and politician
- Kent Weed, American television director and producer
- Lawrence Weed (1923–2017), American physician, researcher, educator, entrepreneur and author
- LeRoy J. Weed (1878–1961), American book publisher and politician
- M. Teresa Paiva-Weed (born 1959), American attorney and politician
- Robert Law Weed (1897–1961), American architect
- Speed Weed, American television writer and producer
- Stephen H. Weed (1831–1863), U.S. Army general in the American Civil War
- Tad Weed (1933–2006), placekicker for the 1954 Ohio State Buckeyes football team
- Thurlow Weed (1797–1882), American printer, newspaper publisher and politician
- Walter Harvey Weed, geologist and husband of Alma Stencel

== Fictional characters ==
- Colonel Weed, a character in Gunga Din
- Jonathan Weed, Peter Griffin's boss in the animated TV series Family Guy
