= Beriah Brown =

American politician

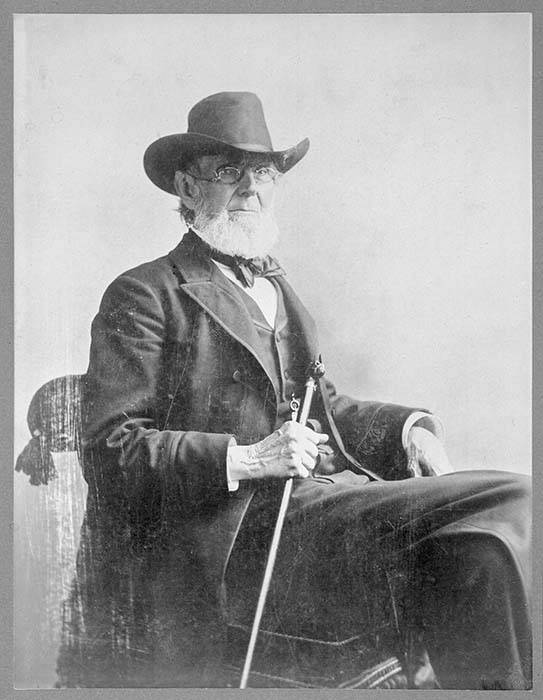
- Beriah Brown, circa 1890

9th Mayor of Seattle
- In office July 29, 1878 – August 2, 1879
- Preceded by: Gideon A. Weed
- Succeeded by: Orange Jacobs

Personal details
- Born: February 23, 1815 Canandaigua, New York, U.S.
- Died: February 8, 1900 (aged 84) Anaconda, Montana, U.S.
- Party: Democratic
- Occupation: Newspaper publisher

Beriah Brown (February 23, 1815 – February 8, 1900) was a newspaper publisher and politician who served as Mayor of Seattle, Washington, as well as a regent for both the University of Wisconsin–Madison and the University of Washington.

== Background and Wisconsin years ==
Brown was born on February 23, 1815, in Canandaigua, New York.

A newspaper publisher by trade, Brown was a Democrat who served as Clerk and Recorder of Iowa County, Wisconsin, and was a member of the first board of regents of the University of Wisconsin–Madison. He was the roommate of Horace Greeley, his political opposite who later became a noted newspaper editor in New York City.

In 1858, he was an unsuccessful candidate for the United States House of Representatives from Wisconsin.

== Move west ==
He moved to California in 1862 and became well known for his pro-Confederacy views. As the editor of the daily Democratic Press in San Francisco, he amassed a large library; when news arrived of the assassination of Abraham Lincoln, a mob ransacked Brown's office and burned 20,000 volumes. He supported the establishment of a white supremacist colony in Sonora, Mexico, and opposed the Civil War.

Brown moved to the Pacific Northwest after the burning of his office and library, working at newspapers in Portland, Oregon, and Salem, Oregon, in the 1860s. He moved to Washington Territory and co-founded the territory's first newspaper, the Puget Sound Dispatch, in 1871. Brown was later president and chairman of the board of regents of the University of Washington.

On July 8, 1878, Brown was elected mayor of Seattle as a People's Ticket candidate. He served for one year while continuing to publish the Dispatch. Shortly after leaving office, he sold the Dispatch as it underwent financial difficulties.

Brown died on February 8, 1900, in Anaconda, Montana.
