= Leonard P. Smith =

American politician

Leonard Smith
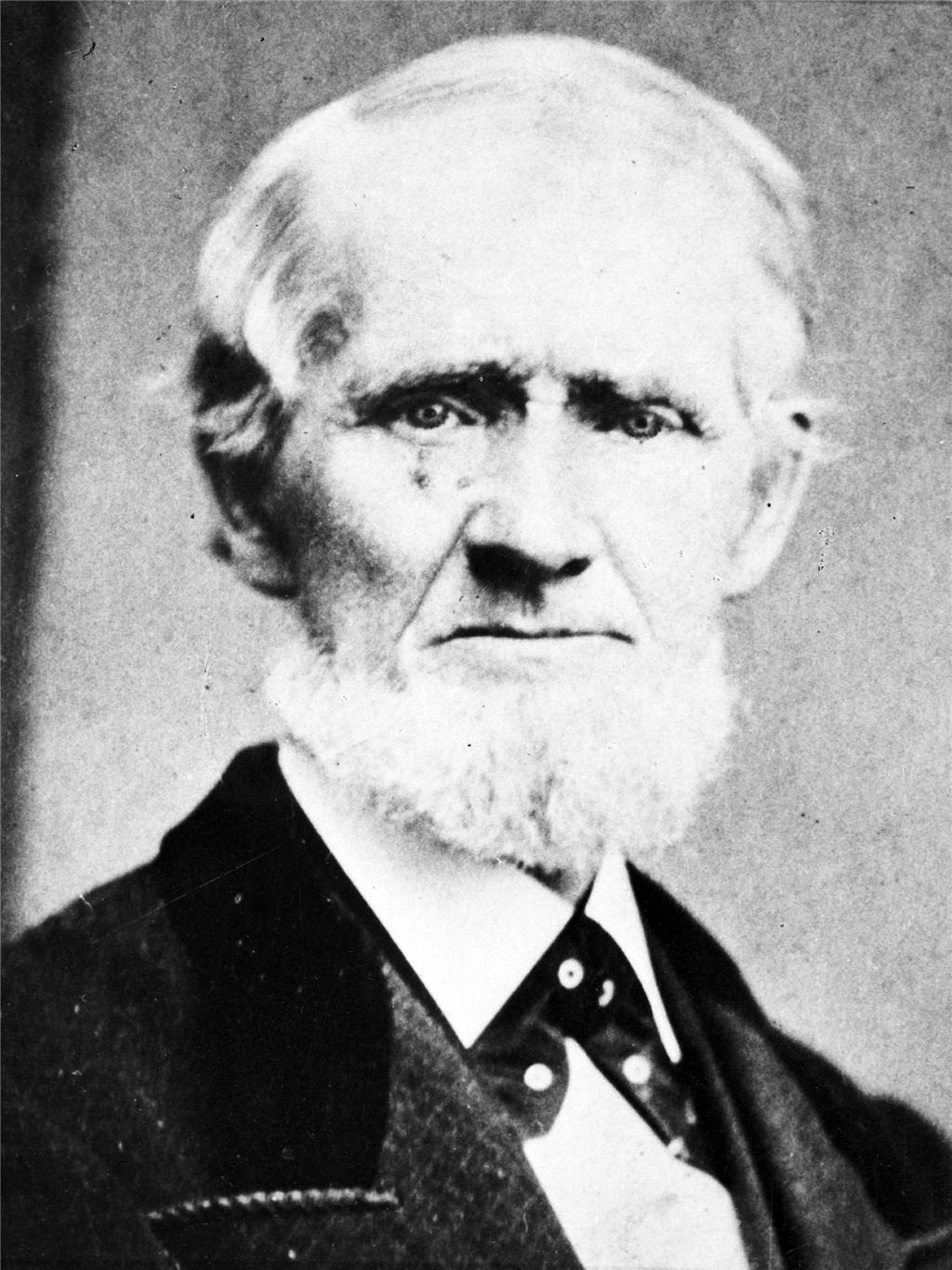
- Smith in 1886

11th Mayor of Seattle
- In office August 2, 1880 – July 31, 1882
- Preceded by: Orange Jacobs
- Succeeded by: Henry G. Struve

Personal details
- Born: October 31, 1814 Bangor, Massachusetts, United States
- Died: April 20, 1886 (aged 71) Seattle, Washington, United States
- Party: Republican

Leonard P. Smith (October 31, 1814 – April 20, 1886) was an American politician in Maine and Washington. He was born in Bangor, Maine, and trained as a silversmith and watchmaker. In 1854, he moved to California, and moved back to Maine in 1856. He was elected to the Maine Senate, serving from 1858 to 1859. After moving West, Smith was elected to the Washington Territorial House of Representatives for the 1879 and 1881 sessions. He then served as the Mayor of Seattle from 1880 to 1882. He died at his daughter's home in Seattle on April 20, 1886.
