= Bill Speidel =

American columnist and historian (1912–1988)

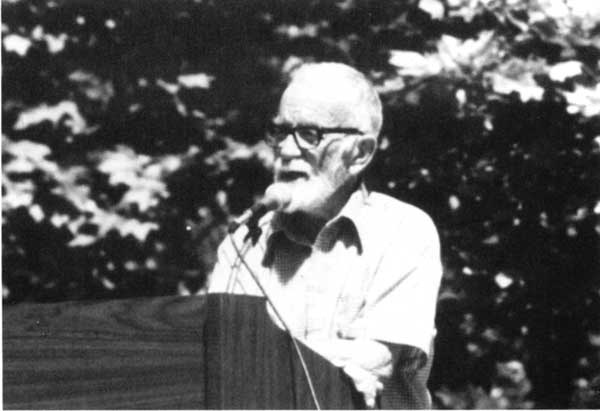
- Speidel at Klondike Gold Rush National Historical Park dedication, 1979
- Born: February 11, 1912
- Died: May 3, 1988 (aged 76); Seattle, Washington, U.S.
- Occupations: Newspaper columnist, historian
- Spouse: Shirley Ross Speidel
- Children: 4, including Julie Speidel

William C Speidel (February 11, 1912 – May 3, 1988) was a columnist for The Seattle Times and a self-made historian who wrote the books Sons of the Profits and Doc Maynard, The Man Who Invented Seattle about the people who settled and built Seattle, Washington.

Speidel is also credited with being one of the leaders of the movement to preserve and restore Pioneer Square, one of Seattle's oldest neighborhoods. By the 1960s, this area was run down and in disrepair, in danger of being demolished and rebuilt.

In 1964, Speidel received and printed a letter from a reader asking about the underground areas of Pioneer Square. He replied via the paper that he did not know much about it, but that he would research it and get back to her. Once he did the research, he printed a response telling her to meet him at 3 p.m. the next Saturday in Pioneer Square, and he would take her on a tour of the underground and what he had found.

The reader did show up, along with 500 other people. Speidel quickly took up a collection of $1 from each of the visitors and proceeded on the first tour of the Seattle Underground. Since Memorial Day weekend 1965, the Underground Tour has given several tours a day every day except holidays and is one of the city's best known tourist attractions.

As a Seattle historian, Speidel was something of a revisionist and the narration of the Underground Tour reflects that. Doc Maynard, whom Speidel called "The Man Who Invented Seattle", was given short shrift in what Speidel characterized as the "Party Line" on the city's history, in part because the longer-lived Arthur Denny was so influential on the writing of that history. Jacob Furth, whom Speidel wrote "may even have been the most important citizen Seattle ever had" was highly lauded at the time of his death in 1914, but later became, in Speidel's words, "a neglected giant", with "scant mention in our history books" and "no streets, statues, parks or public buildings to honor him." Speidel also made claims for brothel-owner Lou Graham as a key figure in the growth of the city.

== Bibliography ==
- You Can't Eat Mount Rainier!. Portland, Oregon: Binfords & Mort. 1955. LCCN 55041684.
- Be My Guest! In The Pacific Northwest. Vashon Island, WA: Nettle Creek. 1957.
- Speidel, William (1961). You Still Can't Eat Mount Rainier!. Vashon Island, WA: Nettle Creek.
- Seattle underground; a pictorial story with historical footnotes and interesting anecdotes about the forgotten city beneath modern Seattle. Seattle, WA: Seattle Guide. 1967. ASIN B0007HLBEA.
- Sons of the Profits or There's No Business Like Grow Business The Seattle Story 1851–1901. USA: Nettle Creek. 1967. ISBN 0-914890-06-9.
- The Wet Side Of The Mountains (or Prowling Western Washington). Seattle, WA: Nettle Creek. 1974. ISBN 0-914890-01-8.
- It Was a Hell of a Blast!. Universal Services. 1975. ASIN B00072GEVU.
- Doc Maynard, The Man Who Invented Seattle. USA: Nettle Creek. 1978. ISBN 0-914890-02-6.
- Luck Location & Lunacy. Seattle, WA: Seattle City Light. 1984. ASIN B00073BZSG.
- Through the Eye of the Needle. USA: Nettle Creek. 1989. ISBN 0-914890-04-2.
