= Weed (disambiguation) =

A weed is an unwanted plant of any species.

Weed or weeds may also refer to:

== Places ==
- Weed, California, a city in the United States
- Weed, Kentucky, an unincorporated community in the United States
- Weed, New Mexico, an unincorporated community and census-designated place in the United States
- Weed Lake, a wetland in Calgary County, Alberta, Canada

== Arts, entertainment, and media ==
=== Film and television ===
- Weeds (1987 film), starring Nick Nolte
- Weeds (2017 film), an animated short film featuring an anthropomorphic dandelion
- Weeds (TV series), an American dark comedy television series about a drug-dealing suburban soccer mom
- "Weeds" (Millennium), an episode of the TV series Millennium

=== Music ===
- The Weeds (band), a 1980s indie pop band
- The Lollipop Shoppe, previously The Weeds, a 1960s American garage band
- Weed (album), a 2004 Chris Whitley album
- Weeds (album), a 1969 album by Brewer & Shipley
- Weeds (Sugababes song), 2025
- Weeds (Life of Agony song), 1997
- Weed Records, a short-lived R&B label of Motown
- "Weeds", a song by Marina and the Diamonds from Froot
- "Weeds", a song by Victoria Williams from Swing the Statue!
- "Weeds", a song by Beach Bunny from Emotional Creature

=== Other uses in arts, entertainment, and media ===
- Weed (manga), a Japanese manga series
- "Weeds" (short story), a 1976 story by Stephen King
- WEED (AM), a radio station in Rocky Mount, North Carolina, United States
- The Weeds, a policy- and news-analysis podcast from Vox

== Other uses ==
- Weed (surname)
- Weed (drug), a common slang word for the drug cannabis (see also List of slang names for cannabis)
- Weed (genus), a common slang word for plants in the genus Cannabis that produces the drug
- Weeds Act 1959, an Act of the Parliament of the United Kingdom
- Canopy Growth (TSX: WEED), Canadian cannabis company
