= Rainier Club =

- U.S. National Register of Historic Places
- Seattle Landmark
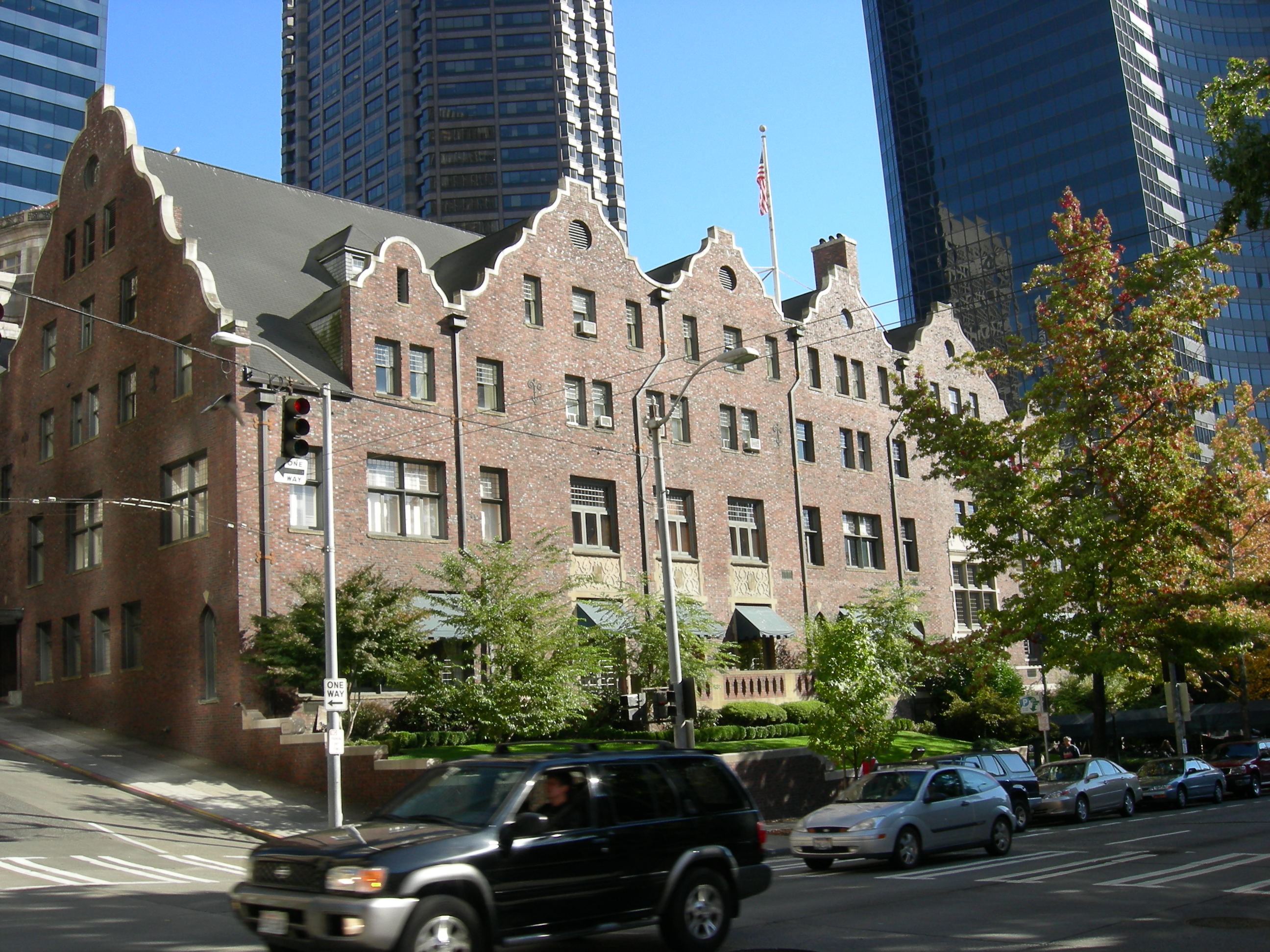

- Location within Downtown Seattle
- Location: 810 4th Ave., Seattle, Washington
- Coordinates: 47°36′22″N 122°19′51″W
- Built: 1903
- Architect: Cutter & Malmgren
- Architectural style: Tudor Revival, Jacobethan Revival
- NRHP reference No.: 76001889

Significant dates
- Added to NRHP: April 22, 1976
- Designated SEATL: June 1, 1987

The Rainier Club is a private club in Seattle, Washington; it has been referred to as "Seattle's preeminent private club." Its clubhouse building, completed in 1904, is listed on the National Register of Historic Places. It was founded in 1888 in what was then the Washington Territory (statehood came the following year). As of 2008, the club has 1,300 members.

== History ==
The Rainier Club was first proposed at a February 23, 1888 meeting of six Seattle civic leaders; it was formally incorporated July 25, 1888. The attendees of the original meeting were J. R. McDonald, president of the Seattle, Lake Shore and Eastern Railway; John Leary, real estate developer and former Seattle mayor; Norman Kelly; R. C. Washburn, editor of the Seattle Post-Intelligencer; Bailey Gatzert, former mayor associated with Schwabacher's (Seattle's and the state's most prominent Jewish-owned business of the era); A. B. Stewart; and James McNaught. Other founding members were lawyer Eugene Carr, Judge Thomas Burke, and William Allison Peters.

The club is named after British Admiral Peter Rainier. The club's logo was modeled on that of the Union Club in Victoria, British Columbia, founded 1877.

Since territorial law in 1888 did not recognize private clubs, the Rainier Club was initially incorporated as a men's boarding house and restaurant. It reincorporated January 18, 1899 as a private club under a revised 1895 state law.

== Buildings ==
The club's first home was in part of James McNaught's Fourth Avenue 22-room mansion (on the site of today's Seattle Central Library). McNaught was happy to have a tenant: he was moving to St. Paul, Minnesota to take a position as chief counsel for the Northern Pacific Railroad. The house also functioned—along with the armory at Fourth and Union—as an interim city hall after the Great Seattle Fire destroyed most of the City in 1889. This brought additional city leaders into the club.

McNaught and the club did not remain on good terms over the lease and the club relocated to the Bailey Building at Second and Cherry (now Broderick Building, after Henry Broderick). After a brief period there, from February 1893, the clubhouse was located in rooms at the then newly erected Seattle Theatre, on the site of today's Arctic Building.

The Rainier Club purchased its current property at Fourth Avenue and Columbia Street in downtown Seattle in 1903. The clubhouse, designed by Spokane, Washington architect Kirtland Cutter was completed and occupied in 1904. Seattle architect Carl F. Gould added the south wing in 1929, plus a Georgian-style entry and interior Art Deco ornamentation.

== Activities ==
In 1899, the Club was the launch point for many members of the Harriman Alaska expedition. E. H. Harriman, John Burroughs, John Muir, Edward S. Curtis and Henry Gannett set out to Seal Island and other Bering Sea islands and to the coast of Siberia and the Bering Strait from the Club, and celebrated there on their return.

Gifford Pinchot was a guest at the Rainier Club on the trip that led to the creation of the United States Forest Service and Mount Rainier National Park. A decade later, Edward S. Curtis, a club member from 1903 to 1920, accompanied Theodore Roosevelt on Roosevelt's visit to the then-new park. The Rainier Club has more than 35 photogravures and 27 original signed platinum and silver prints by Curtis from that journey.

Club members, including club president I. A. Nadeau and John C. Olmsted of the Olmsted Brothers landscaping firm, planned the Alaska–Yukon–Pacific Exposition (A–Y–P Exposition) of 1909, which has been said to have "put the City of Seattle on the map." Among the physical legacies of the exposition is the landscaping of the University of Washington campus, which served as the fairground. The Olmsted firm also played a crucial role in the design of Seattle's system of parks and boulevards.

== Prohibition and Great Depression eras ==
As a private club, the Rainier Club had been exempt from Seattle's and Washington's early experiments in Prohibitionism, but when Washington went dry on a statewide basis in 1916, the club could no longer serve liquor by the drink. Throughout the Prohibition era, the club repeatedly reasserted a policy that "no employee of the Club will be permitted under any circumstances to buy, sell, or have any liquor in their possession for sale on the Club premises." In Walter Crowley's words, "This policy was notably silent on members' possession of alcohol..."

The Rainier Club was not exempt from the Great Depression. Having built a new wing to the clubhouse in 1929, they soon faced a loss of members and difficulty in recruiting new ones who could afford the dues. In hopes of recruiting new members, the initiation fee was cut in 1932 from $500 to $200, and in October 1933 to $100. At that time, membership had declined from 851 to 615 over the course of 36 months. According to Crowley, the club benefitted greatly from the end of Prohibition: the "bureaucratic tangle" of the state's new liquor laws allowed liquor by the drink only in private clubs. Indeed, the 1948 relegalization of liquor by the drink in Washington was followed the next year by a reduction of the club's initiation fee from $650 to $400.

== Role in city events ==
Half a century after the A-Y-P Exposition, Rainier Club members played a nearly equally prominent role in the Century 21 Exposition, Seattle's 1962 world's fair. Most notably, Eddie Carlson, President of Western International Hotels (later Westin), was prime mover of the fair, and most organizing meetings were held at the clubhouse.

In 1993, U.S. president Bill Clinton held two Asian Pacific Economic Cooperation (APEC) ministerial meetings with Japan and China at the Rainier Club. These were the first APEC meetings in the U.S., and the first high-level U.S. meetings with China since the Tiananmen Square protests of 1989.

== Membership ==
Originally all-white and all-male, the Rainier Club admitted its first Japanese American member, Saburo Nishimuro, November 25, 1966; its first African American member prominent contractor Luther Carr, July 25, 1978; and its first woman member, Betty Binns Fletcher, August 22, 1978. Fletcher was a name partner at Preston, Thorgrimson, Ellis, Holman & Fletcher (later Preston Gates & Ellis and now K&L Gates) and the first female president of the Seattle-King County Bar Association (1972-1973). The Japanese consul to Seattle had been a courtesy Associate Member from 1923 until the 1941 attack on Pearl Harbor.

Other prominent members have included several members of the Blethen family (owners of The Seattle Times); and art collectors Dr. Richard Fuller (founder of the Seattle Art Museum) and H. C. Henry (founder of the Henry Art Gallery).

Besides the members, prominent visitors to the clubhouse have included John Philip Sousa, Buffalo Bill Cody, William Howard Taft, Lt. General Arthur MacArthur, General Douglas MacArthur, Babe Ruth, Rear Admiral Robert E. Peary, and the members of the early (1893–1911) Japanese trade delegations to the United States.

== See also ==
- List of American gentlemen's clubs
