= Kitsap Bank =

- Type: community bank
- Industry: financial services
- Founded: 1908
- Defunct: January 31, 2026
- Fate: Merged into Heritage Bank
- Successor: Heritage Bank
- Headquarters: Port Orchard, Washington, United States
- Number of locations: 21 (2018)
- Total assets: $1,130,689,000 (2016)
- Owner: Olympic Bancorp
- Number of employees: 260 (2015)
- Website: kitsapbank.com

Kitsap Bank was a community bank headquartered in Port Orchard, Washington in the United States. Established in 1908, it was the oldest and largest locally owned bank in Washington state. On January 31, 2026, it was merged into Heritage Bank of Olympia, Washington, which continues to use the Kitsap Bank name for the former Kitsap branches.

== History ==
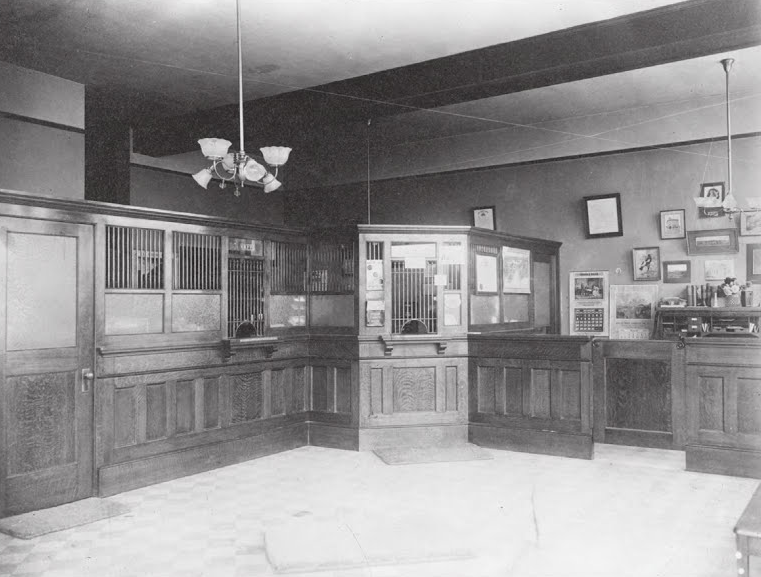
The interior of the original location of Kitsap County Bank pictured in 1909.

Founded in Port Orchard in 1908 by Jacob Furth, George Miller, Peter Nordby, and John Yakey, Kitsap Bank was originally known as Kitsap County Bank. Frank Langer purchased the bank in 1922, serving as its president until his death in 1952. After Langer's death his widow, Hannah Langer (née Norum), was solicited to sell the bank by several larger, Seattle-based institutions but ultimately spurned their offers. Hannah Langer, the daughter of a director of the First National Bank of Poulsbo, became the first female president of a bank in the western United States, heading Kitsap County Bank until 1972 as president, and continuing as chairperson of the board of directors until 1985. By 1977 the bank's assets had grown to $47 million and it owned four retail locations.

From 1985 to 2012, the bank's president was Jim Carmichael. In 1987, Kitsap County Bank changed its name to Kitsap Bank.

Between 2005 and 2015 Kitsap Bank's holding company, Olympic Bancorp, acquired three regional banks which were then folded into Kitsap Bank: Fife Commercial Bank, a single branch bank located in Fife, Washington; Westsound Bank in Bremerton, Washington; and MarinerBank in Port Townsend, Washington.

In 2014 the bank opened a new location in Bremerton, Washington that featured an integrated Starbucks with separate drive-through windows for the bank and coffeehouse. The new facility replaced a previous Kitsap Bank building at the same site; John Glomsted, the manager who opened the previous branch location in 1961, was tapped as the "honorary first customer" during the new building's opening.

In September 2025, Heritage Financial Corporation, the holding company for Heritage Bank, agreed to acquire Olympic Bancorp in an all-stock deal; at the time Kitsap Bank had 17 offices and $1.7 billion in assets. The merger closed on January 31, 2026, when Kitsap Bank was merged into Heritage Bank.

== Operations ==
According to its annual report for 2016, Kitsap Bank held more than $1 billion in deposit accounts and had assets totaling $1.1 billion. That year, it had the largest market share of banks in Jefferson County, Washington, with $113 million in deposits equaling about 23 percent of the value of all deposit accounts in the county.

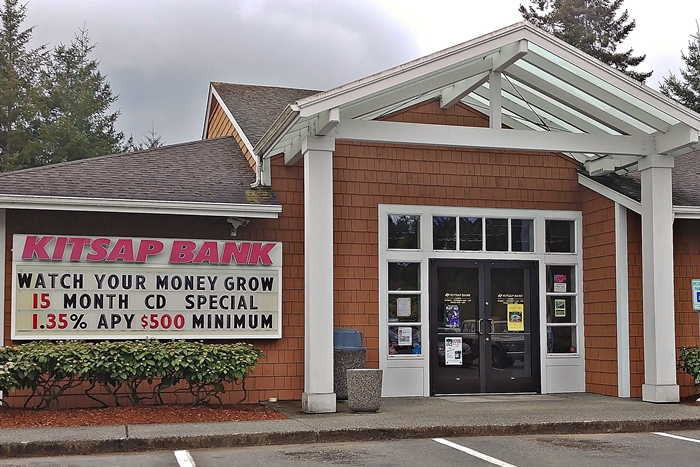
A Kitsap Bank branch pictured in Kingston, Washington in 2018.

Kitsap Bank is the only asset of its holding company, Olympic Bancorp. As of 2016 Kitsap Bank was the tenth largest bank in Washington, and the largest and oldest locally owned bank in the state. It has 21 retail locations in western Washington.

=== Management ===
The chief executive officer of Olympic Bancorp and Kitsap Bank as of 2018 was Steven Politakis, and the bank's president was Anthony M. George. The chair of Olympic Bancorp's board of directors in 2018 was Cydly Langer Smith and its vice chair was Helen Langer Smith.

== Philanthropy ==
From 2013 to 2017 Kitsap Bank was included on the annual list of the 75 "most generous Washington state corporate philanthropists" published by the Puget Sound Business Journal.

== See also ==
- Kitsap County
