= Lou Graham (Seattle madam) =

American brothel owner

- Born: Dorothea Georgine Emile Ohben; February 9, 1857; Germany
- Died: March 11, 1903 (aged 46); San Francisco, California, US
- Occupation: Brothel owner
- Years active: 1888–1905

Lou Graham (February 9, 1857 – March 11, 1903), born Dorothea Georgine Emile Ohben, was a German-born woman who became famous as the madam of a brothel in what is now the Pioneer Square district of Seattle, Washington, United States. She was referred to as the "Queen of the Lava Beds", with "lava beds" referring to the area of tide flats that were filled in with sawdust from the sawmill. She became one of the city's wealthiest citizens before dying in her forties.

== Biography ==
Graham arrived in Seattle by 1884, charged with "Keeping House of Prostitution" by King [County] Frontier Justice by 1887; the city, barely three decades old, was at the tail end of a period (from November 23, 1883, until a series of court decisions in 1887–1888) in which women's suffrage had led to a triumph of "reform" politics there. Monied interests were voted out of political office, liquor licenses revoked, brothels closed, and relevant laws strictly enforced. The result for this frontier economy was, in the words of local popular historian Bill Speidel, that "The fines and licenses on liquor, gambling, and prostitution that had been the major source of income for the operation of the city dwindled to almost nothing."

Graham approached Jacob Furth, and through him a number of the city's leading businessmen, with a proposal for the establishment of a brothel comparable in prices and quality to the city's finest hotels. Prices were to be openly posted (as against charging what the traffic would bear from night to night), staffed by women who would be, as Speidel described them, "gorgeous, . . . talented, . . . [and] who could discuss the opera, or politics, or economics, or world conditions on an intelligent level with the leaders of America."

With their forthcoming start-up capital she purchased the property at the corner of Third and Washington. Her first building was short-lived; it burned in the Great Seattle Fire of June 6, 1889, but she had already profited sufficiently to rebuild in stone afterwards. In less than 18 months she had done well enough to expand significantly. Her initial parcel of land had cost $3,000; The larger parcel she bought after the fire cost $25,000.

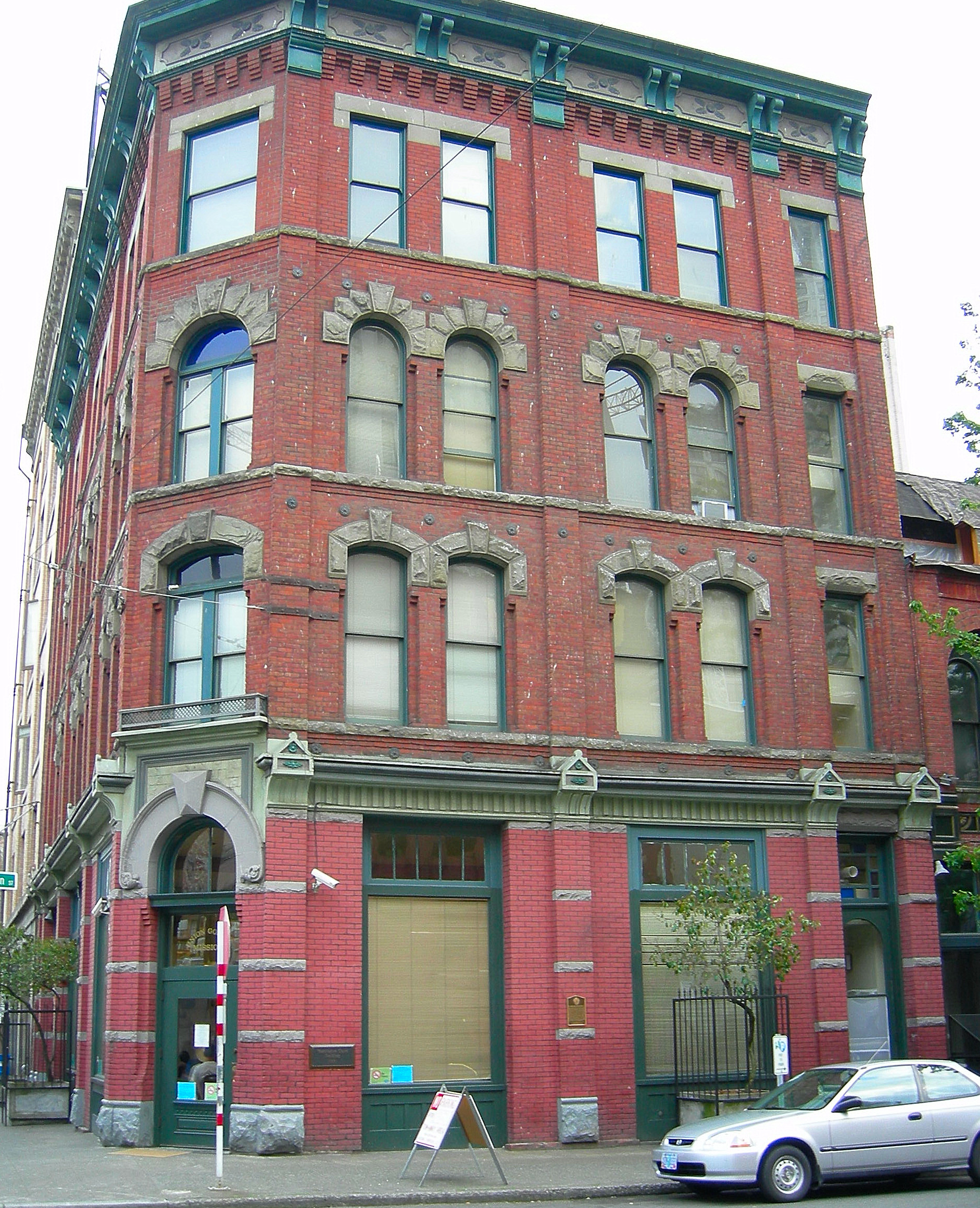
The Washington Court Building at 221 S Washington St, former site of one of Graham's brothels

She established the young city's most refined parlor house at the southwest corner of 3rd Avenue South and South Washington Street, "a discreet establishment for the silk-top-hat-and-frock-coat set to indulge in good drink, lively political discussions and, upstairs, ribald pleasures -- all free to government representatives." Speidel, in his history of early Seattle Sons of the Profits, remarks that in her heyday "More city business was transacted at Lou's than at City Hall." The building survives as the Washington Court Building, 221 South Washington Street and houses, among other things, part of the Union Gospel Mission. There are interior vestiges of the original brothel in the form of a stairway leading up to a second-floor landing from which former bedroom spaces are accessible.

During the period of Graham's ascendancy, Seattle wavered back and forth between "open city" and "closed city" policies. Graham's establishment briefly went dormant during one such "closed city" period in 1890 but soon opened wide its doors for business once again. By February 14, 1891, something of a "Wild West" atmosphere had returned to the tideflats, and a rookie policeman involved in a general crackdown on prostitution arrested Graham out of ignorance of her identity. The result was acquittal in a jury trial and (according to Speidel) the subsequent resignation of reform mayor Henry White.

For the rest of Lou Graham's life, her brothel remained an institution. "No young businessman was really considered a man about town until he could discuss with ease the interior decorations of Lou's establishment...and some of the finer points of the distinguished young ladies…"

== Character and legacy ==
Speidel describes Lou Graham as "regal",

…about five feet, two inches...and at chest height, she was about three feet thick. She went for plumed hats and smart carriages… Lou stood for integrity in her field...and a kind of class that couldn't be matched outside of the other major cities of the world like San Francisco, New York, London, Paris. She was a first-rate businesswoman…[who] invested heavily and profitably in the stock market.

The fortunes of many of Seattle's leading families were founded on loans from Graham. When banker Jacob Furth was approached with a loan request for a business idea that he thought was good, but which he did not think his board of directors at Puget Sound National Bank would approve, he would send them on to Graham, who would make a loan at higher interest, but with less formality. Graham may have been instrumental in saving Furth's bank from a bank run during the Panic of 1893 by ostentatiously making a large deposit. After she died a Puget Sound National Bank employee became administrator of her estate.

By the time she succumbed to syphilis in San Francisco in 1903, Graham had become a wealthy landowner, one of the largest in the Pacific Northwest. She owned one of Seattle's great mansions (2106 E. Madison Street, demolished in 1966) and "contributed liberally" to projects sponsored by the Seattle Chamber of Commerce. At the time of her death, she owned property outside of Seattle including parcels in Edmonds, Barkerville (Whatcom County), Fairhaven, Des Moines, and Gloucester (Jefferson County). She contributed more money to the education of the city's children than the rest of the city's prominent early citizens combined. After the Panic of 1893, her loans saved some of the city's most prestigious families from bankruptcy. At least one source says she left her estate to relatives in Germany, but according to Bill Speidel she died intestate, and her supposed relatives from Hamburg turned out to be frauds. Roland V. Ankeny was made administrator of her estate. The resolution of her estate is chronicled in Robert Abram v. the State of Washington which was heard by the King County Superior Court. This case was appealed and eventually decided by the Washington State Supreme Court. Her estate went to support the common schools in King County, the county in which Seattle is located.

Graham may also have been ahead of her time regarding LGBTQ rights. According to Libbie Hawker, the author of the historical fiction novel Madam about Lou Graham, she may have been in a same-sex partnership, and may, based on Hawker's interpretation of a photograph, have employed trans women.

Speidel wrote in his last book that traditional forms of documentation consistently underrate the contribution of women in general, and particularly of less respectable women such as Graham. He credits Henry Broderick and Joshua Green with corroborating Graham's importance and her business relationship with Jacob Furth, but he notes that both insisted that their names could not be cited in this connection until after their deaths.
