= Julie Speidel =

American sculptor (1941–2025)

- Born: 1941; Seattle, Washington, U.S.
- Died: May 28, 2025 (aged 83–84); Vashon Island, Washington, U.S.
- Known for: Sculptor
- Spouse: Joseph Henke
- Website: juliespeidel.com

Julie Dale Speidel (1941 – May 28, 2025) was an American sculptor from Seattle, Washington. She was the daughter of author Bill Speidel and stepdaughter of oceanographer Robert S. Dietz. She was also part owner of the Seattle Underground tours company, Bill Speidel Enterprises.

== Life and career ==
Speidel was born in 1941. She was raised in the Eastside cities of Bellevue and Hunts Point, Washington before moving to Europe when she was 12 years old. She attended boarding schools in Sussex, then returned to America and studied at the University of Washington and Cornish School of the Arts. She operated a jewelry-making business, making items in copper and other materials, before becoming a sculptor. Her public sculptures are displayed at William Kenzo Nakamura United States Courthouse in Seattle, United States embassies, and other locations.

Speidel was described as the "greatest living woman Northwest sculptor." She was largely self-taught, though she credited George Tsutakawa with teaching per patination formulations and technique.

As of 2012, she had a studio on Vashon Island.

To commemorate the 25th anniversary of the creation of the Bloedel Reserve on Bainbridge Island, fourteen geometric outdoor sculptures created by Speidel were placed there in 2013, the first artworks at the location. In late 2014, seven of Speidel's outdoor sculptures evoking glacial erratics, collectively titled Erratic Repose, were installed at the Tacoma Art Museum.

Speidel died on May 28, 2025, on Vashon Island.
