= Adaline Weed =

Physician and women's rights advocate

Adaline Melinda Willis Weed (1837–1910), known as Ada Weed, was an American hydropathic medicine practitioner and lectured on women's issues while advocating for women's rights.

== Biography ==
She was born Adaline Melinda Willis in Marion, Illinois in 1837. She started at the New York Hygeio-Therapeutic college in 1856, and while there she met Gideon A. Weed whom she married in 1857. The wedding description in Water-Cure Journal indicates they both graduated and had their M.D. degrees, and they were "now united in hands, hearts, fortunes, and diplomas". Following the wedding they moved to California where they planned to practice hydropathic medicine. Weed would go on to publish about her experience with water-cures and travel. Ada Weed would become the first female physician in Oregon.

Weed was also known as an advocate for women's rights, lecturing about the possibility of women being doctors and lawyers in 1858, though the news about her lectures also raised comments from her as she did not agree with the portrayal of her words. She also lectured on diseases specific to women.

With her husband, they recruited patients in Sacramento, California and Oregon. The Weeds moved to Seattle in 1870, where he would twice be elected mayor. She stopped practicing medicine, became the director of the Library Association, and started hosting charitable events as a society lady.

She died on September 8, 1910, in Berkeley, California.

== Selected publications ==
- Weed, Adaline M.W. (March 1861). "Water-cure travel on the Pacific Coast". Water-Cure Journal. 31 (3): 40.
