= William Rankin Ballard =

American banker and land developer

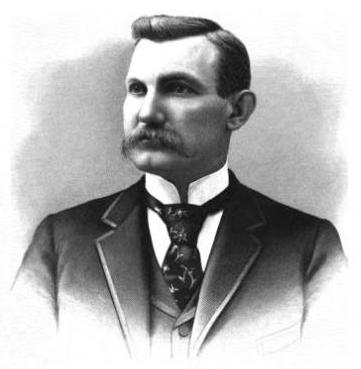
W. R. Ballard circa 1890

Captain William Rankin Ballard (August 12, 1847 – February 4, 1929) was a Seattle pioneer, banker, and land developer. He was one of the founders of the city of Ballard, Washington (incorporated in 1890) which was later annexed to the growing city of Seattle, Washington in 1907. As acting manager of the Seattle National Bank in the early 1890s, he facilitated the construction of what is now known as the Interurban Building in the Pioneer Square neighborhood.

William Rankin Ballard was born to Levi Ward Ballard (founder of Auburn, Washington) and Phoebe Anne McConnell August 12, 1847. He married Estella Thorndike on November 12, 1882 in Seattle, and died in Seattle February 4, 1929.

The title Captain derives from his command of the boat Zephyr that operated between Seattle and Olympia to the south.

Ballard High School was named for Capt. Ballard.
