= Gideon A. Weed =

American politician (1833–1905)

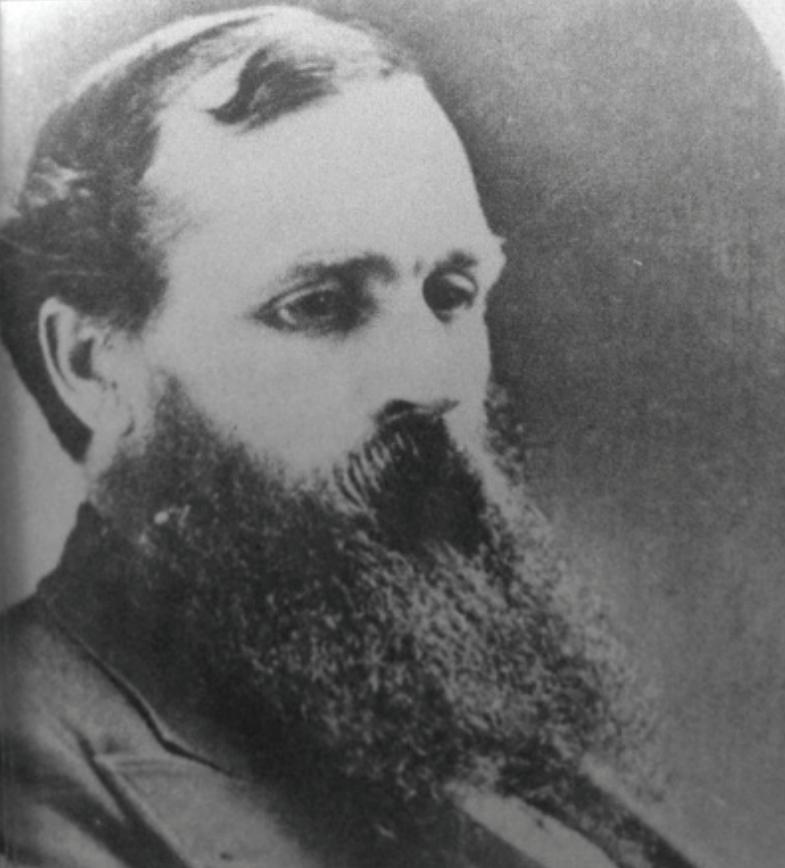

8th Mayor of Seattle
- In office July 31, 1876 – July 29, 1878
- Preceded by: Bailey Gatzert
- Succeeded by: Beriah Brown

Personal details
- Born: March 7, 1833 New Providence, New Jersey
- Died: April 22, 1905 (aged 72) Berkeley, California
- Spouse: Adaline Melinda Willis

Gideon Allen Weed (March 7, 1833 – April 22, 1905) born in New Jersey, Weed was a two-time mayor of Seattle, Washington from 1876 to 1878, first elected in 1875, and serving as an independent.

== Biography ==
Weed took part in the anti-Northern Pacific agitation and was an officer in the Home Guards during the anti-Chinese riots in Seattle. For ten years Dr. Weed served as a regent of the University of Washington.

Weed founded the King County Medical Society in 1888 and helped to organize the Medical Society of Washington and the State Medical Board. Gideon carried through pioneer medical legislation that was much needed in the new state of Washington.

Born in New Providence, New Jersey, Weed received his medical training at Rush Medical College, from which he graduated in 1856. Dr. Weed practiced medicine in California, Nevada, Oregon and Washington State.

Weed, a medical doctor by profession is credited with greatly reducing the impact of a smallpox epidemic in 1877, acting as the city's health officer and even paying for treatment of patients from his own pocket. Weed and his wife, Adaline Weed, also a medical doctor, had settled in Seattle in 1870 after previously practicing hydropathy in Nevada and Oregon, one of the first few to practice it in the United States. Weed suffered a paralytic stroke which forced him into inactivity for the last 10 years of his life. Before his stroke he was one of the most prominent figures in the medical profession in the Pacific Northwest.

He was married to Adaline M. Weed, who was born in Illinois and moved to the west coast after her marriage to Gideon in New York in 1857. Adaline and Gideon met as students at New York Hygeio-Therapeutic College where they both became doctors. "A Wedding on Hydropathic Principles" took place between Gideon Allen Weed and Adaline M. Willis. Classmates at Trall's Hygeio-Therapeutic College described that they "have now united in hands, hearts, fortunes and diplomas." The ceremony took place in the lecture room before the professors and students.

Adaline and Gideon traveled to the west coast of the US via the isthmus of Panama. They lived in Nevada, Oregon, and California until 1870, when they moved to Seattle.

The Weeds were survived by a daughter, Mabel Weed, who was connected with the Carnegie Library of Berkeley, and Ben Weed, who discovered the natural amphitheater back of Berkley University, which for years was called "Ben Weed's Theater" and is now the Greek theater.

Gideon Weed died in 1905 at his home in Berkeley, California.

Political offices
| Preceded by Bailey Gatzert | Mayor of Seattle; 1876–1878 | Succeeded by Beriah Brown |
