= Henry G. Struve =

American lawyer

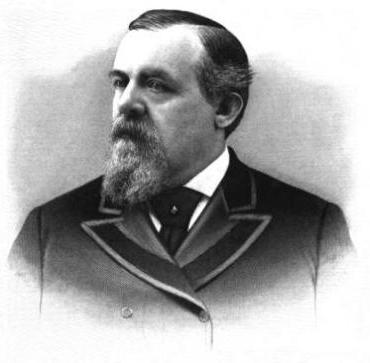

12th Mayor of Seattle
- In office July 31, 1882 – August 3, 1884
- Preceded by: Leonard P. Smith
- Succeeded by: John Leary

Personal details
- Born: November 3, 1836 Grand Duchy of Oldenburg, Germany
- Died: June 13, 1905 (aged 68) New York City, U.S.

Henry G. Struve (November 17, 1836 – June 13, 1905) was a prominent American lawyer, legislator, historian and banker in Seattle, Washington, during the 19th and early 20th centuries. A member of the celebrated Struve family, he was elected mayor of Seattle in 1882 and 1883, during a time of rapid civic growth and prosperity.

== Early life and marriage ==
Struve was born in 1836 in the Grand Duchy of Oldenburg in northern Germany, (Note: The County of Oldenburg was an independent county from the late 12th century until it was absorbed by Denmark in 1667. Made independent again in 1773 under Friedrich August von Holstein Gottorp, the county was erected into a duchy in 1775. It was annexed by France in 1806-07 and 1810-13. Made a grand duchy by the Congress of Vienna in 1815, Oldenburg joined the German Confederation in 1815, the North German Confederation in 1867, the German Empire in 1871 and the Weimar Republic in 1919. Since World War II it has been part of the state of Lower Saxony. See William D. Craig, Coins of the World 1750-1850, 3rd edition, pp. 179-180. Racine, Wisconsin: Western Publishing Company, Inc., 1976.) the son of Friedrich and Marie Margarethe (née Claussen) Struve. He received his education in Germany before emigrating to the United States in 1853 at the age of 16. After a short stay in New York City he went to California, where he located near Jackson in Amador County. There he engaged in mining, studied law, and wrote for newspapers. He was admitted to the bar in 1859.

In February 1860 Struve moved to Vancouver, Washington, where he was editor of the Vancouver Chronicle for a year. He then commenced the practice of law in the winter of 1861. Struve was elected district attorney for the 2nd Judicial District in 1862 and was thrice re-elected, serving until his resignation in 1869.

At Vancouver in October 1863, Struve married Lascelle Knighton (1846-1903), daughter of Captain H.M. Knighton, a prominent early settler of Washington Territory. The Struves were the parents of four children:

- Harry K. Struve
- Helen Struve (Mrs. Harry F. Meserve)
- Frederick Karl Struve
- Mary Struve

== Territorial secretary ==
Struve was elected to the lower house of the territorial legislature in 1865 and was chairman of the judiciary committee. He was elected to the legislative council in 1867, serving as its president in that session and in those of 1869 and 1870. He was chairman of the committee on ways and means, and in 1869 he secured passage of a law recognizing community property rights of married persons.

He resigned as district attorney upon his election as judge of probate of Clarke County in 1869. Struve moved to Olympia in 1871 and assumed the editorship of the Puget Sound Daily Chronicle. After a promising start, he left newspaper work later in 1871 when President Ulysses S. Grant appointed him secretary of Washington Territory. He held this position to the end of the Grant Administration in 1877. While serving as territorial secretary, Struve was sole attorney for the Northern Pacific Railroad, and remained its chief litigator until the completion of the railroad in 1883.

In 1872 Struve was a delegate to the Republican National Convention at Philadelphia where Grant was renominated. Fraternally, he was active in the Independent Order of Odd Fellows, and in 1874 served as grand master of the Grand Lodge of Oregon, which then embraced Oregon, Washington and Idaho. In 1876 he was representative from the Grand Lodge of Oregon to the Sovereign Grand Lodge of the order, and in this capacity instituted the Grand Lodge of Washington. Socially, he was a member of the Rainier Club.

== Law and business interests ==
Struve was commissioner for the codification of the laws of Washington in 1877–78, resigning to devote his attention to his rapidly growing law practice. In 1879 he moved to Seattle, where he formed the law partnership of Struve & Leary with John Leary. Colonel J.C. Haines joined the firm in 1880, and Maurice McMicken replaced Leary in 1884. Haines withdrew from the firm in 1889. When John B. Allen joined the firm in 1893, it was organized as Struve, Allen, Hughes & McMicken.

He was one of the principal projectors of the system of cable car street railways in Seattle, serving as president of the Madison Street line until 1899. He was one of the organizers and a director of the Home Insurance Company, which paid out a $100,000 fire loss in the great Seattle fire of June 6, 1889. In November 1889 he was an incorporator of the Boston National Bank of Seattle, serving as vice president and a director. Struve was also the sole agent in Washington of the German Savings & Loan Society of San Francisco until 1896, at which time he was succeeded by his son Frederick Karl.

== Mayor of Seattle ==
In 1879, soon after moving to Seattle, Struve was appointed a regent of the Territorial University (forerunner of the University of Washington), and served, by reappointment, four terms, being president of the board during that tenure.

Struve was elected mayor of Seattle in 1882 and was reelected in 1883. During his tenure the city enjoyed great prosperity and growth; many civic improvements were made, at a cost of more than $500,000, and Seattle's population doubled from 5,000 to 10,000. As mayor, he received the Villard party upon the completion of the Northern Pacific Railroad in September 1883. Upon leaving the office of mayor in 1884, Struve was elected school director, serving until 1887.

Appointed judge advocate general by Governor Squire in January 1886, Struve took a prominent part in directing the militia when Seattle was placed under martial law following the anti-Chinese riots of February 1886 (during the mayoralty of Henry L. Yesler).

== Later life ==
In 1887 Struve was appointed reporter of the Territorial Supreme Court. Under his supervision, the third volume of the Washington Territory Reports was compiled.

Struve was greatly interested in historical research and investigated Washington's early history in his leisure hours, intending to publish the results in book form, but all of his data was lost in the great Seattle fire of June 6, 1889. However, he started on the work again at a later period.

Struve was a member of the board of freeholders that framed a new city charter for Seattle in 1890. He soon had to decline many honors and confine his attention to his extensive private practice, acting as counsel for many railroads and lumbering and coal-mining companies.

Henry G. Struve died during a visit to New York City on June 13, 1905. His death was very unexpected, his daughter Mary being the only member of the family with him at the time. Burial was in Lake View Cemetery in Seattle.

== Notes ==
Political offices
Preceded by Leonard P. Smith	Mayor of Seattle; 1882–1884	Succeeded by John Leary
