= Henry Broderick (realtor) =

American historian

- Born: October 12, 1880; Minneapolis, Minnesota, U.S.
- Died: October 7, 1975 (aged 94)
- Occupation: Realtor

Henry Broderick (October 12, 1880 – October 7, 1975) was a Seattle, Washington realtor, civic leader, memoirist, and Seattle historian. He arrived in Seattle in 1901 and, in 1908, founded the real estate firm that he would turn into the city's largest.

== Life and achievements ==
Broderick was born and raised in Minneapolis, where he attended the public schools until the financial panic of 1893 caused him to drop out at age 13. From that time, he worked to help support his family, but continued to study informally on his own (including Greek classics). He would later describe himself as "a graduate of the Minneapolis Public Library".

Following a brief stint composing advertisements for agency Lord and Thomas in Chicago, he married Mary Barclay of St. Louis, Missouri October 4, 1901; the couple moved to Seattle before the end of the year. Broderick went to work for a prominent local real estate firm, John Davis & Company. Over the next few years he worked his way up from an entry-level job posting For Sale signs to a management role. He first became a public figure in his role at Davis acquiring property for the Union Pacific Railroad.

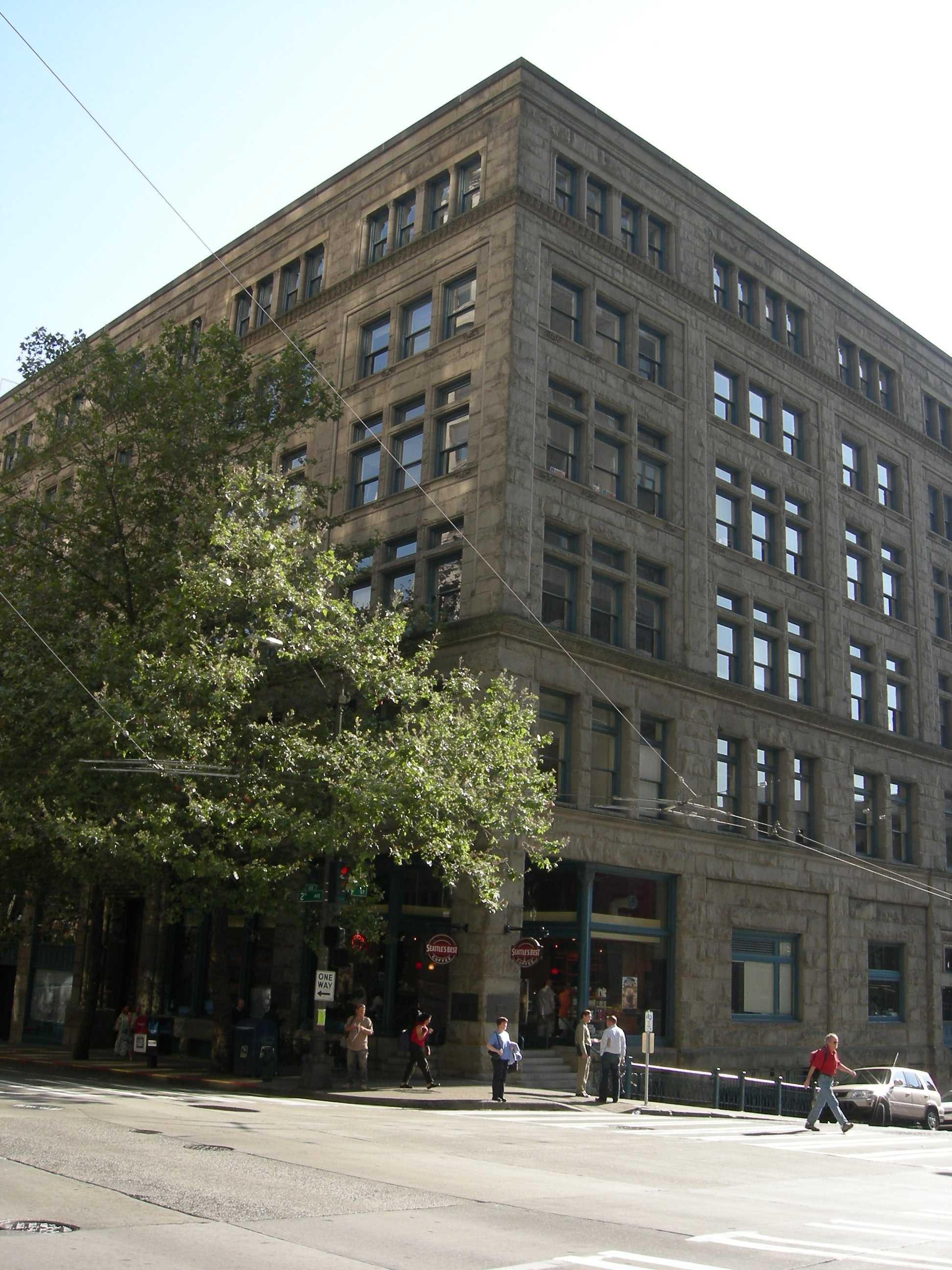
The Bailey Building, 623 Second Avenue in Seattle, where Broderick had his offices for 43 years, was renamed in 1986 as the Broderick Building in his honor.

He left Davis's employ in 1908 to found his own real estate firm, Henry Broderick, Inc. He remained president of the company until 1965 and then served as its chairman until 1969, when the firm was sold to Coldwell Banker. Henry Broderick, Inc. became the city's largest real estate firm and one of its largest property management firms. Its role in property management proved particularly crucial to carry it successfully through the Great Depression.

From the outset of his career, Broderick, a Roman Catholic, refused to participate in real estate covenants against Jews. He adopted this policy as early as his time at John Davis and Company: around 1904 he refused to have the firm manage a large apartment complex that excluded Jews. As a result, his own firm attracted many Jewish clients.

In 1909, Broderick was youngest of 49 trustees of Seattle's Alaska–Yukon–Pacific Exposition (A-Y-P), an unofficial world's fair. Years later, in 1962, as the only surviving A-Y-P trustee, he served as a trustee Seattle's Century 21 Exposition and, toward the end of his life as an honorary trustee of Spokane, Washington's Expo '74 world's fair.

Although Broderick was himself the youngest of 10 children born to Irish immigrants, he and his wife Mary never had any children of their own. Mary Broderick died in 1958. The Brodericks were patrons to many younger people, and their 1906 home in the Denny-Blaine neighborhood was often the scene of parties at which "High school and university students, as well as personnel of the armed forces, have enjoyed classical music or boogie-woogie in the Brodericks' music room, walked alone, in pairs, or groups over the landscaped grounds…" Broderick wrote in one of his memoirs:

… [L]ife there was influenced by the great Greek philosopher Epictetus. … Exponent of "everything in its place", he advocated the practice of the inner life, utterly divorced from externals. … We determined that No. 1717 was to be a haven untouched by the tedium of the materialistic side of life. … [W]e carefully excluded all who came with thoughts of commerce lurking in the background.

Starting with the Broadway High School group who graduated in 1908, we gathered a collection of youngsters whose lives became intertwined with our own. We called them "near-sons" and "near-daughters"…

Broderick was a member (1951–1975) of the Seattle University board of regents, and a mentor to Father A. A. Lemieux, president of the Jesuit institution from 1948 to 1965. A constant joiner and an inveterate civic leader, he was a member of the Seattle Chamber of commerce and Downtown Boosters Club (and served terms as president of each), Greater Seattle, Inc., the board of the Seattle Symphony (where he also served a term as president), the Seattle Arts Commission, the Rainier Club, the Seattle Press Club, the Seattle Tennis Club, Washington Athletic Club, 101 Club, the Harbor Club, and even the Pacific Northwest International Writer's Conference.. He served on the boards of directors of The Seattle Star, the Seattle Day Nursery, as a trustee of the Seattle Chorale, and, from 1929 to 1933, the Washington Prison Parole Board. He was a founding member of the Seattle Realty Board (now the Seattle-King County Board of Realtors). In 1952 he was given the Board of Realtors' First Citizen Award (not typically awarded to one of their own members).

Broderick never drove a car, and did not fly on an airplane until he finally agreed to fly to his own 89th birthday party, hosted in San Francisco by his old associate Louis Lurie.

Although best known as a businessman and civic leader, Broderick was also a memoirist and local historian. Every year from 1932 to the end of his life, he sent out a booklet about local history at Christmas, drawing both on research and his own personal memories (though also, doubtless, passing along some apocryphal stories). Some of these writings were later published in two volumes, Timepiece and The "HB" Story.

According to Nard Jones, Broderick was among the last Seattleites who could "fully" speak Chinook Jargon.

== Partial bibliography ==
The following is a partial bibliography of works by Broderick.

- [Christmas greetings from Henry Broderick.] Seattle: Dogwood Press (F. McCaffrey), 1933–1975.
- The command ment breakers of Walla Walla. Seattle: Dogwood Press (F. McCaffrey), 1934.
- Timepiece; being a first collection of the writings of Henry Broderick. Seattle, 1953.
- Early Seattle profiles by "HB"; some recollections. Seattle: Dogwood Press (F. McCaffrey), 1959.
- Mirrors of Seattle's old hotels. Seattle: Dogwood Press (F. McCaffrey), 1965.
- The HB story: Henry Broderick relates Seattle's yesterdays, with some other thoughts by the way. Seattle: F. McCaffrey, 1969.
- "HB" writes about Henry Broderick. Self-published, 1971.
