= Bailey Gatzert =

American politician (1829–1893)

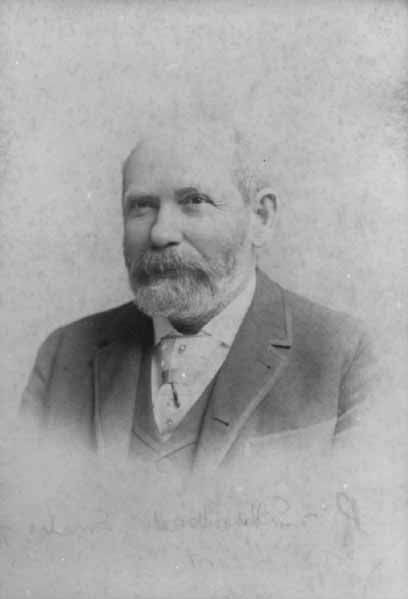

7th Mayor of Seattle
- In office August 2, 1875 – July 31, 1876
- Preceded by: Henry Yesler
- Succeeded by: Gideon A. Weed

Personal details
- Born: December 29, 1829 Darmstadt, Hesse, German Confederation
- Died: April 19, 1893 (aged 63) Seattle, Washington, U.S.

Bailey Gatzert (December 29, 1829 – April 19, 1893) was an American politician and the eighth mayor of Seattle, Washington, serving from 1875 to 1876. He was the first Jewish mayor of Seattle, narrowly missing being the first Jewish mayor of a major American city (Moses Bloom became mayor of Iowa City, Iowa, in 1873). As of 2022, he has been the only Jewish mayor of Seattle.

Gatzert was born in 1829 in Darmstadt, Grand Duchy of Hesse, and emigrated to Natchez, Mississippi, in 1849, coming west four years later. In 1853 he traveled west following the California Gold Rush. Failing at prospecting, he provided miders with food, clothing, and equipment, starting his own grocery and general mercantile business in Nevada City. He married Babette Schwabacher in 1862 at San Francisco.

In 1869 he opened a Seattle branch of Schwabacher Brothers and Company, a hardware and general store he managed as partners with his brothers-in-law Abraham, Louis, and Sigmund Schwabacher.

In addition to being mayor, Gatzert was charter member of the Seattle Chamber of Commerce, served on the Seattle City Council 1872–1873 and 1877–1878 and was president of Puget Sound National Bank and Peoples Savings Bank. He co-founded Washington's second synagogue (Seattle's first), Ohaveth Shalom, which opened in 1892. Washington's first synagogue was built in Spokane.

The famous sternwheeler Bailey Gatzert is named for him, as is an elementary school in Seattle.

== See also ==
- Utilities of Seattle: Getzert's partnership in the Spring Hill Water Company

Political offices
Preceded by Henry Yesler	Mayor of Seattle; 1875–1876	Succeeded by Gideon A. Weed
