= Moran sternwheelers =

Set of steamboats built in 1898

- Moran sternwheelers under construction.

General characteristics
- Class & type: 1898 Moran sternwheelers
- Displacement: 718.68 gross; 409.06 regist.
- Length: 176.1 ft (53.68 m)
- Beam: 35 ft (10.67 m)
- Draft: 4.0 ft (1.22 m)
- Depth: 5.9 ft (1.80 m) depth of hold
- Installed power: twin steam engines, horizontally mounted; cylinder bores 20 in (50.8 cm); stroke 84 in (213.4 cm), 26.6 NHP, 700 IHP
- Propulsion: sternwheel

The Moran sternwheelers were a set of 12 almost identical sternwheel steamboats built in 1898 by the Moran shipyard in Seattle, Washington to run on the Yukon and tributary rivers in Alaska.

== Construction ==
The Moran sternwheelers were built to take advantage of the huge demand for inland shipping that was caused by the Klondike Gold Rush. All the vessels were launched the same day, April 23, 1898, every one with steam up in the boiler. The vessels were all complete by about May 25, 1898.

== Transfer to Alaska ==
All twelve vessels were assembled at Roche Harbor to clear customs, that being the most northerly customs house from which to begin the transfer north, which they were to make under their own power. Robert Moran himself was on the lead boat, Pilgrim, which was under the command of Capt. Edward Lennan, a highly skilled Alaska pilot. Accompanying the flotilla were the steam tugs Richard Holyoke and Resolute, the steam schooner South Coast, and six supply barges.

The long voyage to the mouth of the Yukon River on the Bering Sea was difficult and one of the vessels (Western Star) was wrecked en route.

== List of vessels ==
Name	Registry(ies)	Year built	Where Built	Builder	Volume (gross tons)	Hull Length	Remarks
D. R. Campbell	U.S.A. #157509	1898	Seattle, Washington	Moran Bros. (hull #10)	718	176 feet	Originally owned by Seattle-Yukon Transportation Co. Transferred to Northern Navigation Co. in 1901. Acquired by White Pass in 1914. Not used under White Pass ownership. Sold by White Pass and abandoned by new owner at St. Michael Canal, Alaska in 1927. Named for David Rae Campbell (1830–1911), a Maine wool manufacturer who financed the Seattle-Yukon Transportation Co.
F. K. Gustin	U.S.A. #121071	1898	Seattle, Washington	Moran Bros. (hull #11)	718	176 feet	Originally owned by Alaska Exploration Co. Transferred to Northern Navigation Co. in 1901. Acquired by White Pass in 1914. Not used under White Pass ownership. Abandoned at St. Marys, Alaska in 1917.
J. P. Light	U.S.A. #77296 (1898–1900 & 1905–1927); Canada #107860 (1900–1905)	1898	Seattle, Washington	Moran Bros. (hull #9)	785	176 feet	Originally owned by British America Corp. Sold to Dawson White Horse Navigation Co. in 1900. Sold to Tanana Trading Co. in 1905. Sold to North American Transportation & Trading Co. in 1906. Sold to Northern Navigation Co. in 1911. Acquired by White Pass in 1914. Not used under White Pass ownership. Sold by White Pass and abandoned by new owner at St. Michael Canal, Alaska in 1927. Named for James P. Light (fl. 1898), a citizen of Chicago, IL, who originally organized the Seattle-Yukon Transportation Co.
Mary F. Graff	U.S.A. #92856 (1898–1900); Canada #107839 (1900–1928)	1898	Seattle, Washington	Moran Bros. (hull #17)	864	177 feet	Originally owned by Blue Star Navigation Co. Sold to Alaska Exploration Co. in 1899. Sold to Canadian Development Co. in 1900. Acquired by White Pass in 1901. Last used in 1903. Abandoned at Dawson City, Yukon in 1928. Named for Mary F. Graff (b. 1874), sister of Alaska pioneer Samuel M. Graff, and daughter of Philadelphia financier John F. Graff Jr.
Oil City	U.S.A. #155318	1898	Seattle, Washington	Moran Bros. (hull #20)	718	176 feet	Originally owned by Standard Oil Co. of California. Sold to Charles W. Adams in 1904. Resold to partnership of Adams, the Dominion Commercial Co., and Mersereau Clark in 1905. Resold to Northern Navigation Co. in 1908. Acquired by White Pass in 1914. Not used as a boat under White Pass ownership. Used by White Pass as an office and warehouse at Holy Cross, Alaska. Abandoned in 1943.
Pilgrim	U.S.A. #150778	1898	Seattle, Washington	Moran Bros. (hull #18)	718	176 feet	Originally owned by Blue Star Navigation Co. Sold to Columbia Navigation Co. in 1900. Resold to British-American Steamship Co. in 1899. Resold to Northern Navigation Co. in 1901. Acquired by White Pass in 1914. Not used under White Pass ownership. Abandoned across the bay from St. Michael, Alaska in 1917.
St. Michael	U.S.A. #116816	1898	Seattle, Washington	Moran Bros. (hull #15)	718	176 feet	Originally owned by Empire Transportation Co. Transferred to Northern Navigation Co. in 1901. Acquired by White Pass in 1914. Not used under White Pass ownership. Abandoned at St. Marys, Alaska in 1943. Village of St. Michael, Alaska named for Capt. Mikhail Dmitrievich Tebenkov (1802–1872), governor of Russian America.
Seattle	U.S.A. #116817	1898	Seattle, Washington	Moran Bros. (hull #12)	718	176 feet	Originally owned by Empire Transportation Co. Transferred to Northern Navigation Co. in 1901. Acquired by White Pass in 1914. Not used under White Pass ownership. Abandoned across the bay from St. Michael, Alaska in 1917.
Tacoma	U.S.A. #145773	1898	Seattle, Washington	Moran Bros. (hull #13)	718	176 feet	Originally owned by Empire Transportation Co. Transferred to Northern Navigation Co. in 1901. Acquired by White Pass in 1914. Not used under White Pass ownership. Abandoned at St. Marys, Alaska in 1927.
Victoria	U.S.A. #116811	1898	Seattle, Washington	Moran Bros. (hull #14)	718	176 feet	Originally owned by Empire Transportation Co. Transferred to Northern Navigation Co. in 1901. Acquired by White Pass in 1914. Not used under White Pass ownership. Abandoned at St. Marys, Alaska in 1927.
Western Star	U.S.A. #81603	1898	Seattle, Washington	Moran Bros.	718	176 feet	Wrecked near the mouth of Cook Inlet en route to St. Michael, Alaska, total loss.
