= D.R. Campbell =

Steamboat built in 1898

History

Canada
- Name: D.R. Campbell
- Builder: Moran Bros.
- Launched: April 23, 1898
- Out of service: 1927
- Identification: U.S. Registry #157509
- Fate: Abandoned

General characteristics
- Type: Inland steamboat
- Tonnage: 718.68 gross; 409.06 regist.
- Length: 176.1 ft (53.68 m)
- Beam: 35 ft (10.67 m)
- Draft: 4.0 ft (1.22 m)
- Depth: 5.9 ft (1.80 m) depth of hold
- Installed power: twin steam engines, horizontally mounted; cylinder bores 20 in (50.8 cm); stroke 84 in (213.4 cm), 26.6 nominal horsepower
- Propulsion: sternwheel

D.R. Campbell was a sternwheel steamboat built in Seattle in 1898 which ran on the Yukon and tributary rivers in Alaska.

== Construction ==
D.R. Campbell was built at the shipyard of Robert Moran, a successful shipbuilder in Seattle, Washington. It was named for David Rae Campbell (1830–1911), a Maine wool manufacturer who financed the Seattle-Yukon Transportation Co.

D.R. Campbell was one of twelve nearly identical sternwheelers built at the same time at the Moran yard. These vessels were built to take advantage of the huge demand for inland shipping that was caused by the Klondike Gold Rush. All the vessels were launched the same day, April 23, 1898, everyone with steam up in the boiler. The vessels were all complete by about May 25, 1898.

== Transfer to Alaska ==
All twelve vessels were assembled at Roche Harbor to clear customs, that being the most northerly customs house from which to begin the transfer north, which they were to make under their own power. Robert Moran himself was on the lead boat, Pilgrim, which was under the command of Capt. Edward Lennan, a highly skilled Alaska pilot. Accompanying the flotilla were the steam tugs Richard Holyoke and Resolute, the steam schooner South Coast, and six supply barges.

The long voyage to the mouth of the Yukon River on the Bering Sea was difficult and one of the vessels (Western Star) was wrecked en route.

== Career on the Yukon ==
D.R. Campbell arrived at Dawson, Yukon, on September 8, 1898, with a 400-ton barge. The vessel was worked on the Yukon River runs from Dawson to Fairbanks, Alaska, and also from Dawson over the whole course of the Yukon downriver to St. Michael, Alaska.

D.R. Campbell was originally owned by the Seattle-Yukon Transportation Company but was transferred to the Northern Navigation Company in 1901. The vessel was acquired by White Pass in 1914 but was not used under White Pass ownership. White Pass sold the Campbell, and the vessel was abandoned by its new owner at St. Michael Canal, Alaska in 1927.
