= Lenox (restaurant) =

Restaurant in Seattle, Washington, U.S.

- Interactive map of Lenox

Restaurant information
- Chef: Jhonny Reyes
- Food type: Latin American; Nuyorican; Puerto Rican
- Location: 2510 First Avenue, Seattle, King, Washington, United States
- Coordinates: 47°36′54″N 122°20′56″W
- Website: lenoxwa.com

Lenox is a restaurant in the Belltown neighborhood of Seattle, Washington, United States. It was named one of the nation's best new restaurants by Bon Appétit in 2025.

== Description ==
The Nuyorican / Puerto Rican restaurant Lenox operates in Seattle's Belltown neighborhood. The Infatuation's Aimee Rizzo has described Lenox as a "Harlem-inspired Latin soul food spot". The menu has included empanadas with chicken, a salad with sweet corn, pickled cherries, and squash, and a piña colada.

== History ==
The business started as a pop-up restaurant. Jhonny Reyes is the chef.

== Reception ==
Writers for Seattle Metropolitan included Lenox in a 2024 list of the city's best new restaurants. The Infatuation included the business in a 2025 list of the best restaurants in Belltown.
