= Frank Waterhouse =

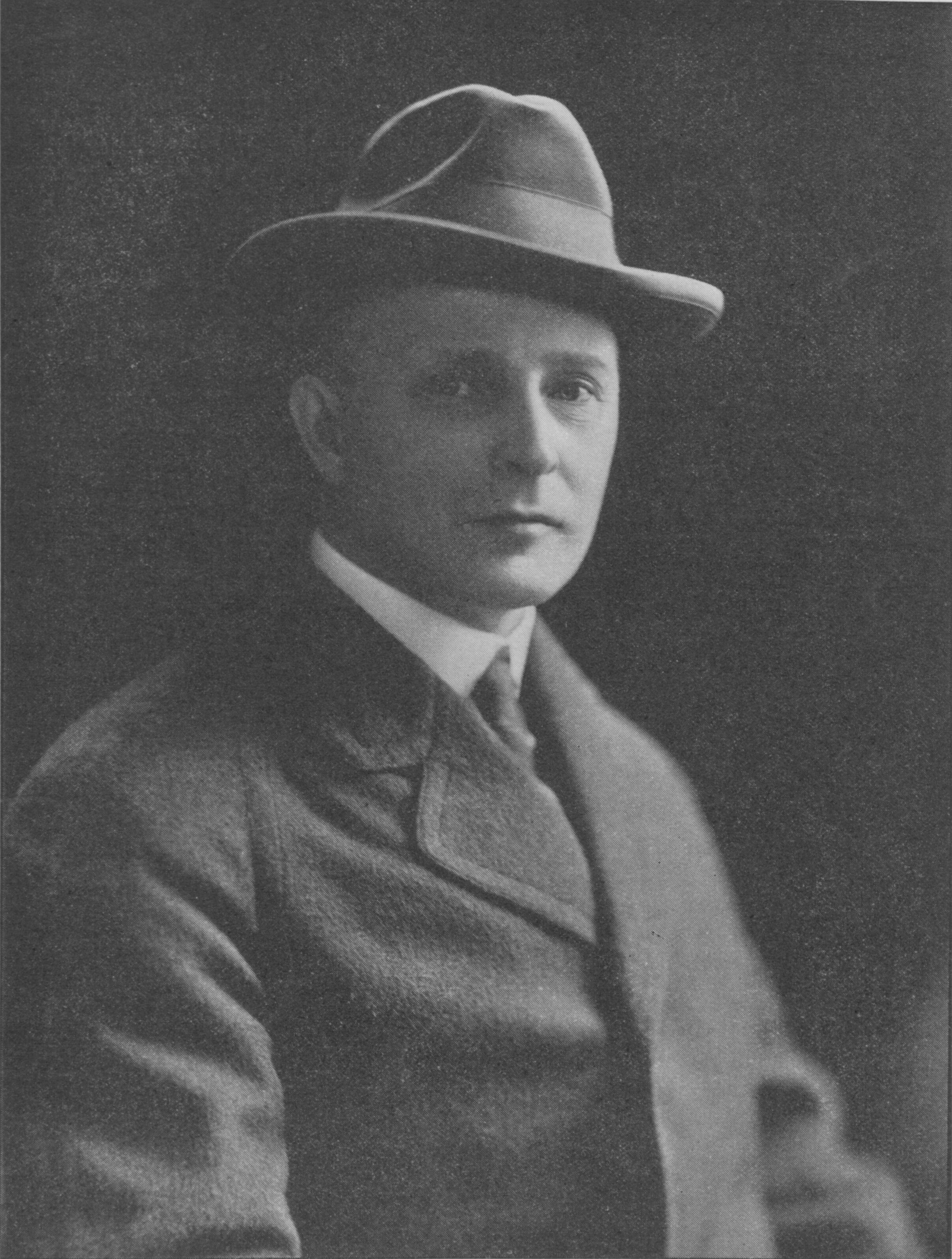
Frank Waterhouse, circa 1917

Frank Waterhouse (August 8, 1867 – March 20, 1930) was an English-born, American-based businessman, a prominent figure in the shipping industry in the early 20th century. He was also president of the Seattle Chamber of Commerce and of two Seattle taxi companies. His New York Times obituary described him as having had "one of the most colorful careers in the history of the Pacific Northwest."

Waterhouse was born in Cheshire, England. He moved to Minnesota in the United States at the age of 15, then back to England 1889–1892, before settling definitively in the U.S. in 1892 Early in life, Waterhouse was successively a farmworker, a bricklayer's assistant, clerk, stenographer, then a railroad worker and later manager. He went on to operate a steamship line, and to be a prominent figure in insurance and finance.

Beginning in 1897, Seattle established itself as the main jumping off point for the Klondike Gold Rush and the subsequent Nome Gold Rush. In 1898, Waterhouse established Frank Waterhouse & Co., and later established a Canadian subsidiary, Frank Waterhouse & Co. of Canada, Ltd., and owned a large portion of Japanese company, International Shipping Company, Ltd. Shortly before its failure in 1920, the company was described as, "a company of numerous departments, controlling through important subsidiaries various branches of production and trade and carrying on extensive business as shipowners, charterers, dock operators, forwarders, coal bunkerers, automobile and truck dealers, insurance agents, publishers, etc." Besides its Seattle headquarters, the company had branches in New York City, Chicago, San Francisco, Kobe, Singapore, and Calcutta.

Waterhouse provided transportation to the Yukon and Alaska, including a Bering Sea service. In this same period, he chartered a large fleet of ships to the U.S. government at the time of the Spanish-American War (1898); these were used to transport supplies from the U.S. West Coast to the Philippines. His other maritime enterprises included small Puget Sound steamers, the first steamship line from Puget Sound (where Seattle is located) to the United Kingdom via the Suez Canal, the first steamship line from Puget Sound to the Malay Peninsula, and the first cargo line from Puget Sound to Australia. He was also prominent in trade from Puget Sound to the Hawaiian Islands, China, and the Philippines, also providing service to Russia the Mediterranean, and British India. A 1920 book described Frank Waterhouse & Co. as "one of the leading representatives of America's transportation interests" in the Far East.

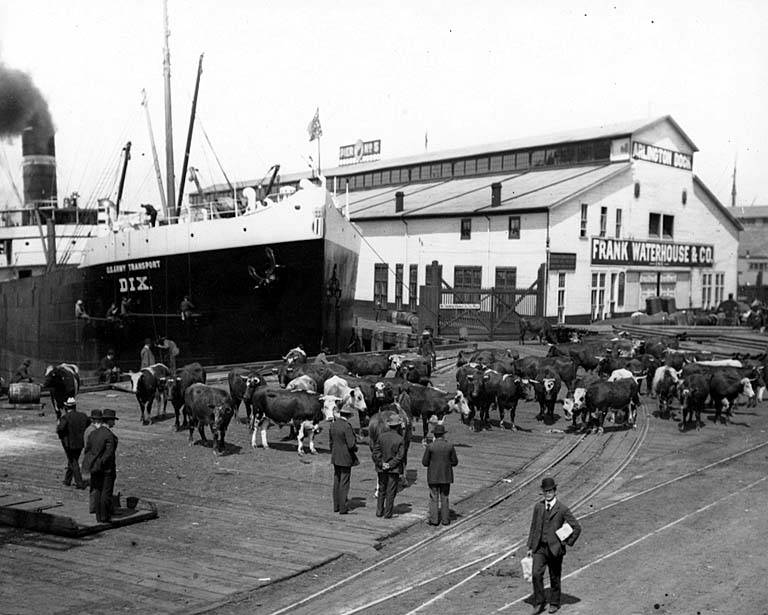
Seattle's Pier 5 (now Pier 56) circa 1907, carrying the names of the Frank Waterhouse Co. and Arlington Dock Co.

Waterhouse's Arlington Dock Co. was a shipping agent for passenger steamships from several West Coast cities to Alaska, Asia and Europe. in 1912, they operated Pier 3–6 in Seattle (now Piers 54–57); Frank Waterhouse & Co. was based at Pier 5, now Pier 56; Piers 4 and 5 (55 & 56) were known at the time as the Arlington Docks.

Outside of the shipping industry, his Waterhouse & Employees operated extensive farmland in Eastern Washington; other companies of his were the Washington Collieries (coal mining, with an emphasis on producing bunker coal for ships), the Arlington Dock Company, and the Waterhouse Sands Motor Company, all later merged into Frank Waterhouse & Co. More locally in Seattle, had as one of its subsidiaries the Seattle Taxicab and Transfer Co. and the Vulcan Manufacturing Company, a machine shop, foundry and forge whose products included engines, deck machinery for steamships, cranes, and derricks. This last did enormous business when Seattle and Puget Sound became a major shipbuilding center during the U.S. involvement in World War I. Further, from 1914 to 1920 their subsidiary Pacific Ports, Inc. published the monthly and annual periodical Pacific Ports.

When the Panama Canal Act required U.S. railroads to divest themselves of their steamship lines by November 4, 1915, Waterhouse saw an opportunity, as the Pacific Mail Line owned by the Southern Pacific Railroad sold off its ships and closed down. Coordinating with Union Pacific Railroad, he opened a trade line to Vladivostok to provision the Imperial Russian Army, which he was soon doing on a scale that exceeded the prior Pacific Mail Line operations. In April 1918, Frank Waterhouse & Co. purchased 12 acres (4.9 ha) on the West Waterway of the Duwamish River, intending to build a new, larger Seattle terminal. When the Associated Industries of Seattle (AIS) was established March 12, 1919, in the wake of the Seattle General Strike, Waterhouse led the new organization as it confronted the International Longshoremen's Association in a series of strikes and lockouts.

Frank Waterhouse & Co. sought bankruptcy protection in 1920, but that was not enough to remove Waterhouse himself from the Seattle business scene. In 1922, still at the helm of AIS, he successfully confronted the coal miners' unions, leading to a decade of largely (but not entirely) open shop/company union labor relations in the region. Although elected as head of the Seattle Chamber of Commerce in 1922, he was still dealing with a bankruptcy. Vulcan Manufacturing Company, in particular, had proved a poor investment, and Waterhouse claimed he had been defrauded in purchasing it, a claim rejected by judge James T. Ronald. For a time, federal judge Jeremiah Neterer refused to grant a bankruptcy because of Waterhouse's "scandalous accusations" against creditor banks, but ultimately did grant the bankruptcy.
