= Politkofsky (steam tug) =

Sidewheel steamship

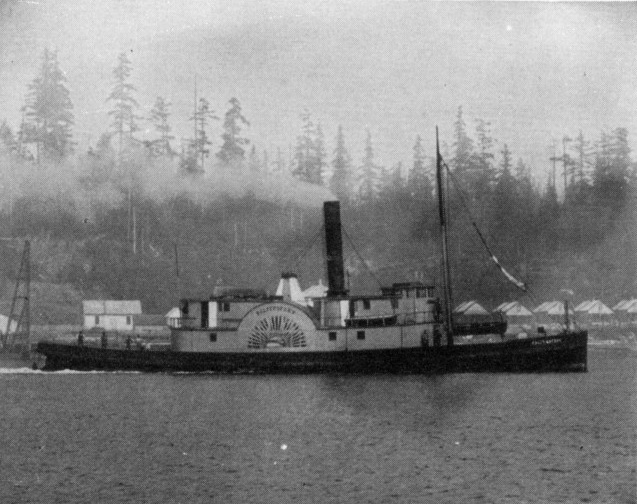
- Politkofsky

History

Russia
- Name: Politkofsky
- Owner: Russian-American Company
- Launched: 1863
- Home port: Sitka, Alaska
- Fate: Sold in January 1868

United States
- Name: Politkofsky
- Owner: Hutchinson, Kohl & Co. 1868; Port Madison Mill Co. 1868; Dexter Horton & Co. 1878; Renton, Holmes & Co. 1882; Yukon Transportation Co. 1897
- Reclassified: steam tugboat
- Identification: Official number: 20304
- Nickname(s): Polly
- Fate: Beached at St. Michael, Alaska

General characteristics
- Class & type: Gunboat
- Length: 129.5 ft (39.5 m) overall
- Beam: 21.3 ft (6.5 m)
- Propulsion: 1 steam engine
- Speed: 7 knots (13 km/h; 8.1 mph)

Politkofsky was a sidewheel steamship built by the Russian-American Company in Sitka, Alaska. She was launched in 1863.

Politkofsky was sold to American interests shortly after the United States purchased Alaska in 1867. She was one of the first steamships in Washington waters and spent most of her working life in Puget Sound and the Strait of Juan de Fuca. She towed log rafts to sawmills, grounded ships off the shore, and sailing ships into and out of narrow harbors. She carried freight, including livestock, and passengers. She reached the end of her economic life and was stripped of her machinery in 1896.

In 1897 Politkofsky was converted into a coal barge to fuel a flotilla of Klondike gold rushers seeking to reach the Yukon River. She was towed to St. Michael where she was briefly used to transfer cargo from ocean-going ships to shore. She was thrown up onto the beach and abandoned in a 1903 storm.

== Construction and characteristics ==
Politkofsky was built at the shipyard at New Archangel, now Sitka, in Russian Alaska. Her construction began in 1862, she was launched in 1863, and was put into service in 1865. It is likely that she was the last major vessel produced by the Russians in Alaska.

Her hull was built of yellow cedar. She was 129.5 feet (39.5 m) in length, with a beam of 21.3 feet (6.5 m) and a depth of hold of 8.9 feet (2.7 m). Her gross tonnage was 255.44 and her net tonnage was 174.89.

Politkofsky's crosshead steam engine was salvaged from the Russian steamer Imperator Nikolai I which was wrecked near Kake, Alaska on 8 November 1861. This engine had been manufactured in the United States and was rated at 60 horsepower. It had a single cylinder that was 2.5 feet in diameter and 7 feet long. It operated at low pressure, between 15 and 30 pounds per square inch. Steam was produced by a copper boiler. This system drove sidewheels that could propel the ship at 7 knots.

Her armament as a Russian gunboat is variously reported. One 1868 report had her armed with eight carronades.

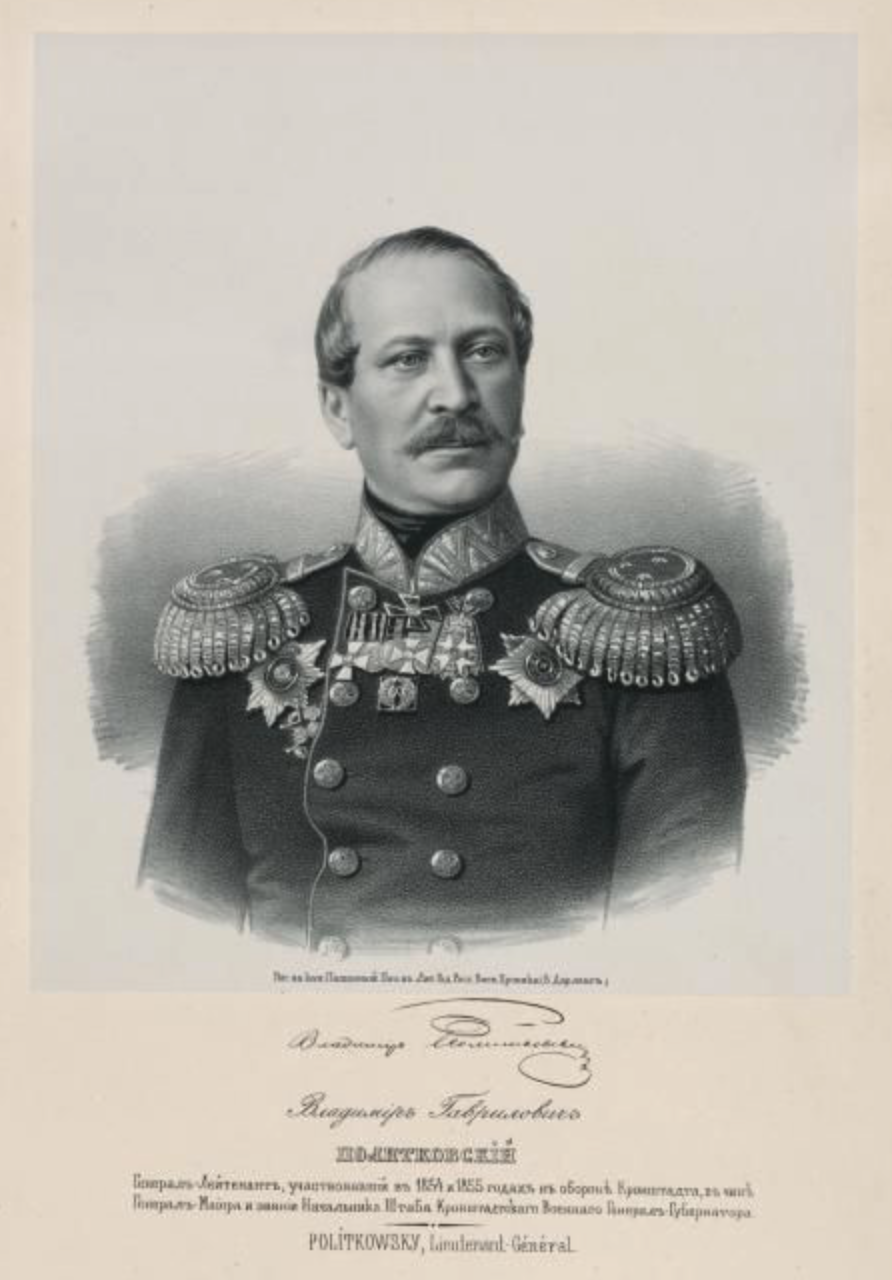
The ship's namesake, Lieutenant General Politkofskii

The ship was named for the chairman of the board of directors of the Russian-American Company General-Lieutenant Vladimir Gavrilovich Politkovskii.

== Russian-American Company service (1863–1868) ==
Politkofsky was used by the Russian-American Company as a tug and transport in the protected waters of Southeast Alaska. She would also assist sailing ships into and out of narrow harbors such as Sitka, her home port. She suffered extensive damage in a boiler explosion while towing Kamchatka to sea from Sitka in November 1866.

== American service ==
=== Hutchinson, Kohl & Company (1868–1869) ===
The government to government transfer of sovereignty over Alaska which took place on 18 October 1867 did not include the assets of the Russian-American Company. It owned buildings, furs, supplies of all sorts, and ships, including Politkofsky, in Sitka and elsewhere in Alaska. In January 1868, Prince Dmitri Petrovich Maksoutov, the last governor of Russian Alaska and chief executive of the Russian-American Company, sold most of the assets of his company, including its ships, to Hayward M. Hutchinson, a Baltimore businessman, who represented a San Francisco-based investment group. The single exception to Hutchinson's purchases for his group was Politkofsky, which he bought for Hutchinson, Hirsch & Company for a reported $4,000. Hutchinson combined his assets with those of a consortium led by William H. Kohl, a San Francisco sea captain, to form Hutchinson, Kohl & Company in January 1868. Politkofsky was resold to Hutchinson, Kohl & Company for $6,000.

Politkofsky was reflagged as an American vessel and cleared Sitka on 10 April 1868 bound for Victoria, British Columbia with William Kohl as her master. She carried fifteen passengers from Sitka to Victoria, which she reached on 21 April 1868. A Victoria newspaper commented negatively on her the next day:

"Sitka may well be proud of her steam marine. The steamer Politkofsky, from Sitka, is one of the most magnificent specimens of home-made marine architecture we have yet beheld. She looks as if she was thrown together after dark by Indian ship carpenters, with stone tools. Her engines are good and were formerly in a Russian Fur Company's steamer, wrecked near Sitka some years ago. The boiler is of copper, and is alone worth more than the price Capt Kohl paid for the whole concern. We hear she is to be rebuilt. She needs it. To be appreciated, she should be seen as she lies at Broderick's wharf."

The ship underwent minor repairs in Victoria. She sailed from Victoria on 11 May 1868 and arrived in San Francisco on 17 May 1868.

Politkofsky's copper boiler was replaced with a conventional iron boiler at San Francisco. Various press reports told the story that the old boiler sold more as scrap than the entire ship cost, but the boiler explosion in Sitka suggests that the motivation for the change might have been safety rather than profit.

=== Meigs and Gawley Mill Company (1869–1878) ===
George A. Meigs and William H. Gawley of San Francisco had a large business importing lumber to northern California for the Central Pacific Railroad and other clients. The source of much of the lumber was the mill they owned at Port Madison, Washington, which in 1872 was the largest in the territory. Politkofsky was purchased to tow log rafts to the mill and to assist ocean-going ships into and out of Port Madison so they could deliver lumber to San Francisco. She left San Francisco on 6 April 1869 and arrived at Port Madison 12 April 1869.

Most of the tug's work was routine, but not all. On 2 January 1870, Politkofsky took the barque Maria J. Smith in tow from Barkley Sound, where she had run aground. A storm came up and the tug was forced to drop her tow in high winds. The crew of the disabled ship was rescued but Maria J. Smith was eventually found washed ashore near Bella Bella, 500 miles from where Politkofsky was forced to cut her free. In July 1875, Politkofsky was towing the barkentine W. H. Gawley to sea, heading west in the Strait of Juan de Fuca. In heavy fog, she collided with the barque Florence and suffered significant damage to her bow.

During the winter of 1876 her boilers were rebuilt by Foster & King of Seattle.

In November of 1878 Dexter Horton & Company foreclosed on the mortgage of over $17,000 on Politkofsky. At the sheriff's auction on 4 January 1879, Dexter Horton bid $5,000 and gained ownership of the vessel.

=== Dexter Horton & Company (1878–1883) ===
After losing ownership of Politkofsky, George Meigs chartered her to continue her role in his lumber mill businesses. Meigs' financial problems, which triggered the sale of the ship, remained however, and Politkofsky was idled in November 1878.

The ship was tied up in the fresh water of the Duwamish River until November 1879 when she was overhauled in Seattle. She was chartered by the Port Blakely Mill Company, and then on 12 February 1883 was purchased by an affiliated company, Renton, Holmes & Company, for $9,000.

=== Renton, Holmes & Company (1883–1897) ===
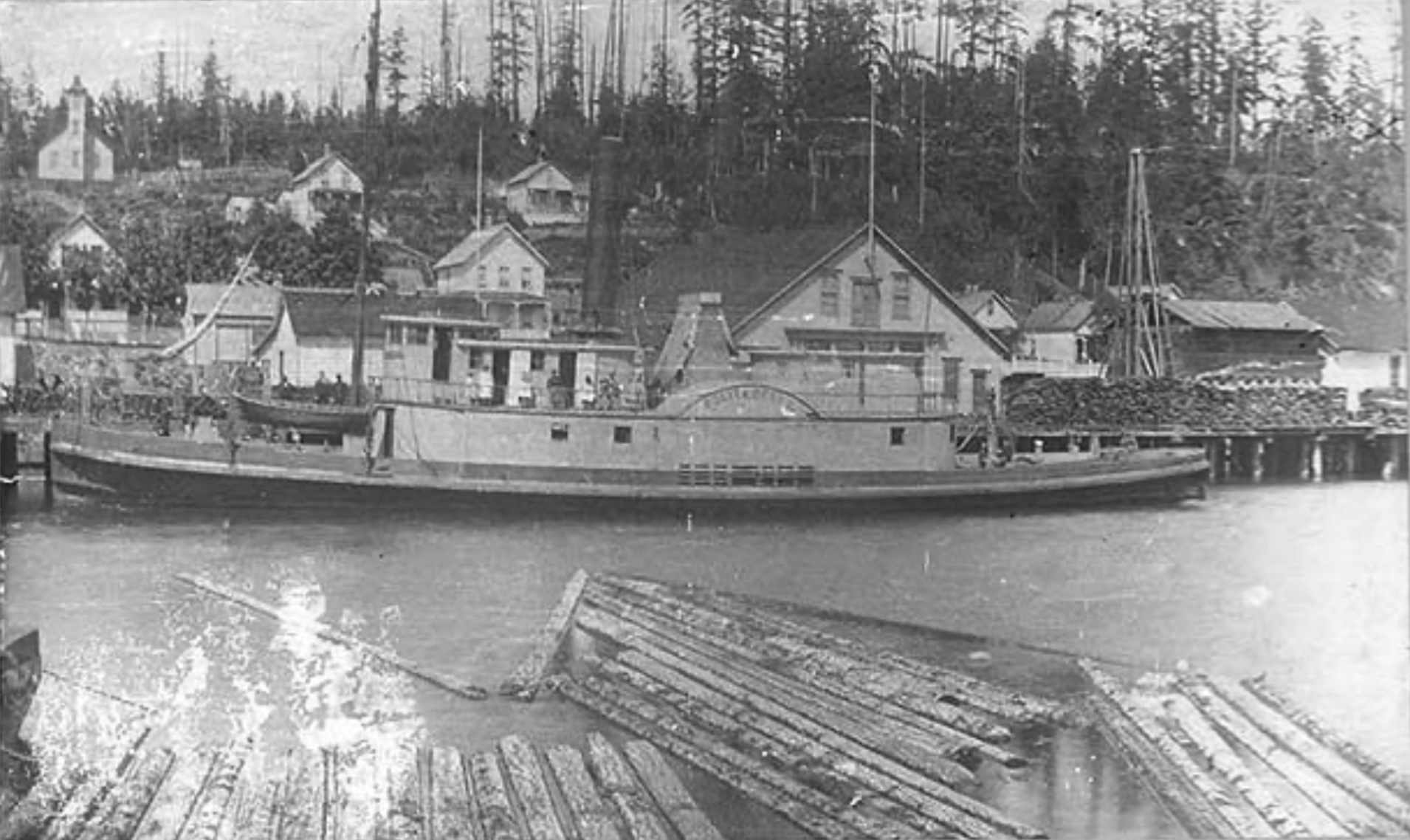
Politkofsky at Port Blakely in 1888

Captain William Renton, Charles S. Holmes, and Richard K. Ham formed multiple businesses in the late nineteenth century. Renton and Holmes each owned 5/12 and Ham owned 2/12. These included Port Blakely Mill Company, Puget Sound and Grays Harbor Transportation Company, and Renton, Holmes & Company. Renton, Holmes & Company owned a fleet of about a dozen ships, including Politkofsky, which transported the lumber produced at Port Blakely to San Francisco. Politkofsky's role in the fleet was as it had always been, towing log rafts and towing ships to sea.

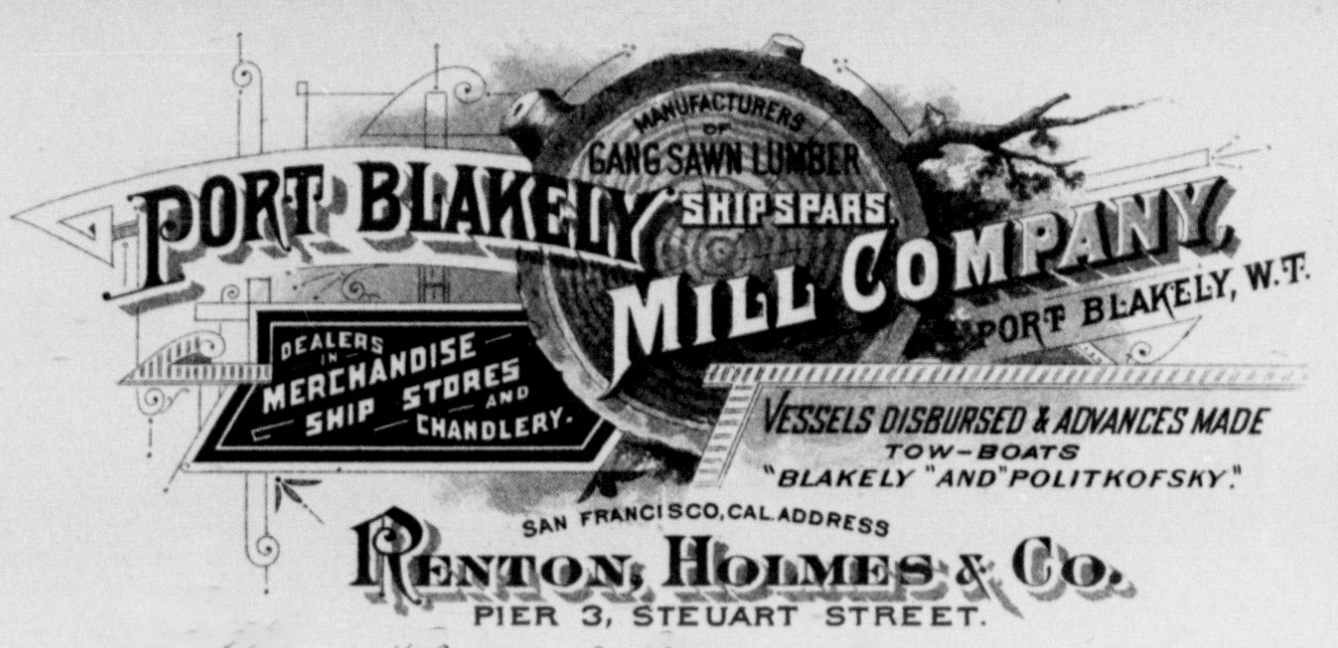
Politkofsky was advertised on Renton, Holmes & Co. letterhead in 1889

In 1888 and 1889, Politkofsky towed barges of rails, spikes, and other construction material, and a locomotive to Grays Harbor for the construction of the Puget Sound and Grays Harbor Railroad.

On 6 May 1891, Politokofsy was part of the fleet that welcomed President Benjamin Harrison to Elliot Bay on his arrival at Seattle. She was also employed in a ceremonial role in July 1891 when William Renton died. Politkofsky and a number of other ships transported mourners between Port Blakely and Seattle for funeral services.

In August 1896 her machinery, cannon, and other material was sold. On 4 September 1896 Politkofsky was laid up at Port Blakely.

=== Yukon Transportation Company (1897– ===
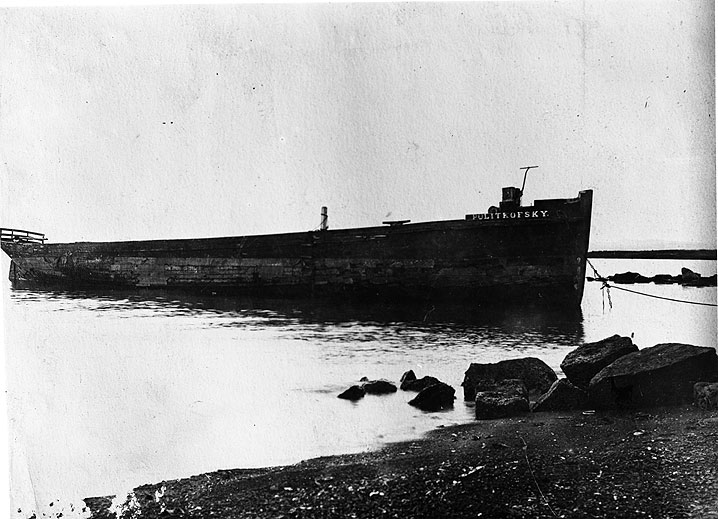
Wreck of Politkofsky on the beach at St. Michael, Alaska in 1906

Gold was discovered in the Yukon in 1896, but word of the Klondike discovery did not reach the Lower 48 until June 1897. Thousands of prospectors rushed to the area that summer. Politkofsky was part of that rush in a hastily organized effort to reach the gold fields.

The Yukon Transportation Company was incorporated on 31 July 1897. It organized a flotilla to sail from Seattle to St. Michael, Alaska, at the mouth of the Yukon River. The sidewheel steamer Eliza Anderson sailed with 125 passengers aboard. She was accompanied by the tug Richard Holyoke, which towed the schooner William J. Bryant with 27 passengers, the steamer W. K. Merwin, and Politkofsky. Politkofsky was loaded with coal to fuel the engines of Eliza Anderson and Richard Holyoke, 14 passengers, and a shallow-draft scow. Once the flotilla reached the Yukon, the men were to ascend the river to the gold fields on W. K. Merwin, and Politkofsky's scow. The vessels left Seattle on 10 August 1897.

The fleet sailed up the inside passage until it reached Dixon Entrance. There it turned into the Gulf of Alaska and encountered a storm which separated Eliza Anderson from the rest of the ships. Richard Holyoke reached Dutch Harbor, with her tows on 26 August 1897, and finally St Michael on 8 September 1897.

=== North American Transportation and Trading Company ===
Politkofsky remained documented with Federal authorities through 1901. During a storm in 1903, Politkofsky broke loose from her mooring and was washed ashore on the beach at St Michael.

== Remains ==
The ship's steam whistle was installed at a number of lumber mills, including the Simpson Logging Company. It reached the University of Washington powerhouse in time to signal the opening of the Alaska-Yukon-Pacific Exposition in 1909. It was sounded by President William Howard Taft using a telegraph signal. It was sounded again, this time by President John F. Kennedy, to open the 1962 Century 21 Exposition in Seattle. The whistle was donated to the Puget Sound Maritime Historical Society where it remains today.

Several of the Politkofsky's cannon survive. In 1889, news of Washington State's admission to the Union as the 42nd state, reached Tacoma. One of Politkovsky's cannons was fired 42 times, plus one more for Tacoma, in celebration. This cannon was donated to the Washington State Historical Society. Another of Politkofsky's guns is in the collection of the Museum of History and Industry in Seattle.

Politkofsky's hull timbers were fastened with hand-hewn copper and iron spikes. Many of these were salvaged from the wreck as it disintegrated on the beach at St. Michael and now reside in museum and private collections.

In 2009 an archeological investigation of St. Michael Bay under the leadership of Michael Burwell, cultural resources specialist for the Minerals Management Service, located several shipwrecks on the sea floor using side-scan sonar. One of these might be the remains of Politkofsky.
