= Richard Holyoke =

1877 steam tug boat built in Seattle, Washington, U.S.

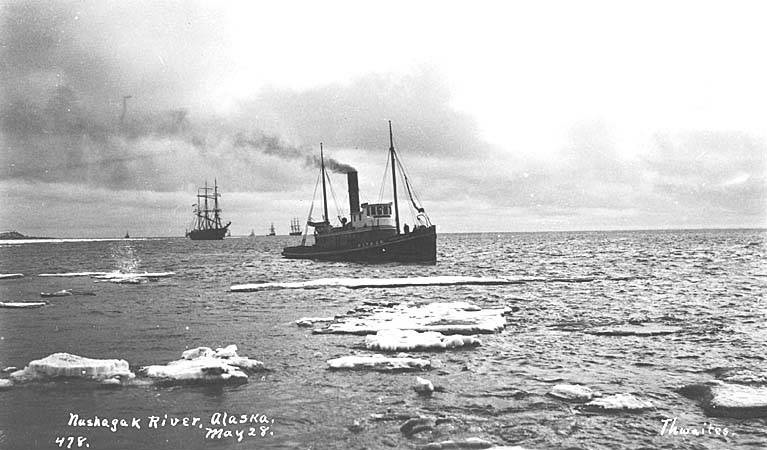
- Richard Holyoke on the Nushagaak River.

History
- Name: Richard Holyoke
- Route: Puget Sound, San Francisco Bay, Alaska, Columbia Bar
- Completed: 1877, Seabeck, WA
- Fate: Dismantled, 1940.

General characteristics
- Type: Steam tug
- Length: 115 ft (35.1 m)
- Installed power: Steam engine
- Propulsion: Propeller

Richard Holyoke was a seagoing steam tug boat built in 1877 in Seattle, Washington and which was in service on Puget Sound and other areas of the northwest Pacific coast until 1935. The vessel was considered to be one of the most powerful tugs of its time.

== Career ==
Richard Holyoke was among the first seagoing tugs to be built on Puget Sound. The vessel was constructed by shipbuilders Hiram Doncaster and William McCurdy at Seabeck, Washington and was named after the manager of the Seabeck lumber mill. In 1891, Holyoke was owned by the Washington Mill Co., which joined with four other mills to form their own tug and towing company, called the Puget Sound Tug Boat Company. Each mill contributed one tug to the new company, and the Holyoke was the contribution of Washington Mill co.

Holyoke, as the vessel was generally known, participated in numerous towing and salvage operations over the years. Some the more notable are described in this article.

=== Attempted salvage of Kilbrannan ===
In early February 1896, Richard Holyoke was dispatched to Point Wilson, where the iron-hulled British sailing ship Kilbrannan had grounded. Despite the efforts of Holyoke and four other powerful seagoing tugs, Kilbrannan could not be pulled off the beach. Kilbrannan was not a total loss, as eventually a special channel was dredged and the vessel was floated free.

=== 1897 flotilla to Alaska ===
On July 30, 1897, in the company of the then very old side-wheeler Eliza Anderson, the Richard Holyoke began towing several vessels from Seattle to St. Michael, Alaska to participate in the Klondike Gold Rush of 1898. The tows included the sternwheeler W.K. Merwin, the former Russian sidewheel gunboat Politkofsky stripped and converted to a fuel barge, and the small schooner William J. Bryant. After a number of misadventures, including the near-loss of the Merwin when the towing cable parted in a storm, the flotilla was eventually able to reach Nome, where the Politkovsky ended up abandoned on the beach. Both Richard Holyoke and William J. Bryant were able to make it back to Puget Sound, where the Bryant was later converted into the steamer Dode.

=== Moran sternwheelers to Alaska ===
In the spring of 1898, Richard Holyoke was engaged, together with two other seagoing tugs, to tow to Alaska, to the mouth of the Yukon River, 12 identical sternwheel steamboats which had recently been completed by the Moran Brothers shipyard in Seattle. After a difficult voyage, the tugs were able to get 11 of the sternwheelers in tow to St. Michael, where one was wrecked shortly after arrival.

=== The Clallam disaster ===
In January 1904, Richard Holyoke, then under the ownership of the Puget Sound Tug Boat Company and another steam tug were dispatched to the rescue of the steamship Clallam, which in bad weather had begun taking on water near the end of its run to Victoria. At about 3:30 pm on January 8, Clallam's master, believing the vessel to be in immediate danger of sinking, had attempted to launch three lifeboats mostly occupied by women and children. However, when the boats were lowered into the water, they either overturned in the waves or were battered into the ship's sides, and 54 people were killed.

Those remaining on board began bailing out the ship with buckets, and Clallam stayed afloat until the next morning, Saturday, January 9. Meanwhile, at about 10:35 p.m. on January 8, Holyoke, under the command of Capt. Robert Hall, found Clallam, a task made more difficult by the absence of any distress rockets on board the sinking steamer.. Captain Hall got a tow line over and took Clallam under tow. This was in between Smith Island and San Juan Island. Although Victoria was closer, the weather conditions were such that it seemed best to head for the American shore. The tug Sea Lion joined them at about 1:00 a.m. on January 9.

Clallam never got to the shore. Captain Roberts realized she was about to founder and signaled the Holyoke to cast off the towline. Holyoke misunderstood Captain Roberts' signal to cast off the tow line, so it had to be cut lest the sinking Clallam drag Holyoke down with her. Clallam rolled over and sank quickly at about 1:15 a.m. The tugs then went to rescue the people in the water, saving most or all of the 36 who had remained aboard. Capt. Edward D. Hickman (1876–1928), then serving as mate on Richard Holyoke, dove into the icy water to rescue 15 people. He suffered from poor health as a result for a long time afterwards.

== Later history ==
In 1916 the Holyoke was sold to the Port Blakely Mill Company to be used for ship construction then being engaged in at Port Blakely by the Skinner and Eddy Corporation. In 1923 Skinner and Eddy sold Holyoke to the Bellingham Tug and Barge Company to be used to tow loads from Puget Sound to Alaska. In 1924 the vessel was equipped with wireless. In 1930 or 1931, the vessel was taken out of service. In 1940 Bellingham Tug and Barge Company sold the vessel to the Metal Conservation Corporation, a Seattle firm. The plan was to install a diesel engine in the hull and relocate the upper works to make room for materials to be salvaged from wrecks in Alaska waters. This never came through, and the hull was abandoned in Lake Union.

== See also ==
- Puget Sound Mosquito Fleet
