= Eagle Harbor (Washington) =

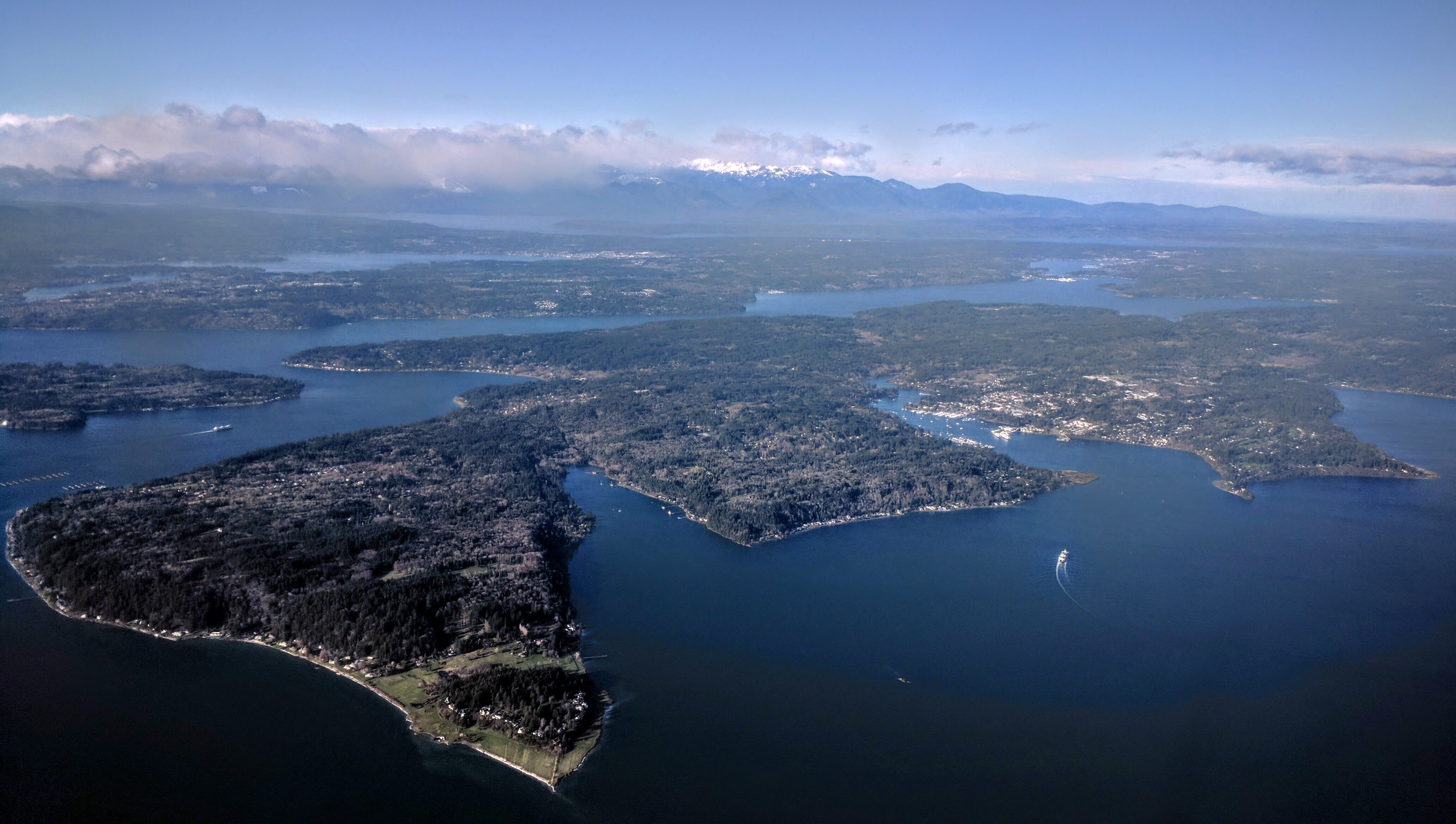
Aerial view of Bainbridge Island from the southeast, showing the ferry from Seattle making the first of two turns to bring it into Eagle Harbor, with Blakely Harbor to its left

Eagle Harbor is a harbor on the east side of Bainbridge Island, Washington. It is the harbor where the Seattle–Bainbridge Island ferry service operates at the island's main town of Winslow. Washington State Ferries has a shipbuilding and maintenance facility in Eagle Harbor near the ferry terminal that it has used since 1951. The harbor has been home to various shipbuilding companies since the early 20th century.
