= Harry White (Washington politician) =

Washington politician (1859–1940)

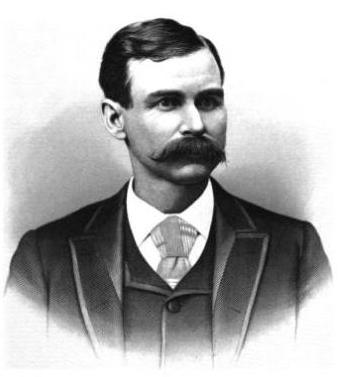

17th Mayor of Seattle
- In office August 3, 1890 – November 30, 1891
- Preceded by: Robert Moran
- Succeeded by: George W. Hall

Personal details
- Born: Horace Greely White; January 5, 1859 Union Township, Louisa County, Iowa
- Died: February 20, 1940 (aged 81) Los Angeles, California
- Party: Republican

Horace Greely "Harry" White (1859–1940) was an American real estate broker and politician who served as the Mayor of Seattle from 1890 to 1891.

== Biography ==
White was the son of the farmer Robert A. White and Hannah E. Newbrough. At the age of 19, he left home for Hamilton County, Nebraska, where he taught school and bought 240 acres of farmland. Between 1883 and 1886 he was manager of a nursery company at York, Nebraska. On December 31, 1885, White married Anna E. Morrow, born in 1864 in Ohio, but living in Harvard, Nebraska. The marriage seems to have remained childless.

In 1887, they moved to Seattle, where he founded the Harry White & Co. real estate and brokerage firm, in which his younger brothers Will R. and George H. White joined him. His company invested heavily in Seattle, buying large swats of land and spending more on advertising than any other organization in Seattle. In July 1889, a month after the Great Seattle Fire that destroyed the entire central business district, he was elected a member of the city council from the First ward. He took great effort in the rebuilding of downtown, for which he was awarded a nomination and election as mayor in July 1890. When Washington became a state on November 11, 1889, Seattle adopted a new charter, and new elections were already held again on October 1, 1890. White was reelected for two years. However, under criticism for his management of public affairs, he resigned on November 30, 1891. The remaining months of his term were completed by fellow progressive Republican George Hall. Clarence B. Bagley wrote about him in his 1916 3-volume history of Seattle that, while in the year after his election "Gambling of every known variety flourished openly, as did harlotry and drunkenness, under the fostering eyes of the police", White had rebuilt Seattle "along modern, progressive lines" and that the "story of Seattle's advancement since 1889 without mention of Mr. White would be like the play of Hamlet without the appearance of the Danish prince".

White left the public eye, but his investments, especially in Alaska, had made him a rich man. At the end of the century the Whites moved to Los Angeles, California, and before 1900, they had bought a house at 220 S. Bunker Hill Ave., where they lived until at least the 1930s. In the censuses White's profession is listed as "mining promoter" (1900) and "real estate brokerage" (1920,1930). He managed his investments through offices in Seattle and London. White died in 1940 at the age of 81 in Los Angeles.
