= William Nathaniel Bell =

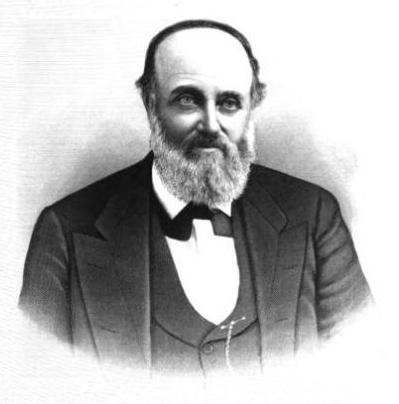
- Sketch of Bell made in 1890, after his death
- Born: March 6, 1817; Edwardsville, Illinois
- Died: September 6, 1887 (aged 70); Seattle, Washington Territory
- Spouse(s): Sarah Ann Peter (1838–1856); Lucy Gamble Peter (1872–1887)

William Nathaniel Bell (March 6, 1817 – September 6, 1887), originally from Edwardsville, Illinois and later a resident of Portland, Oregon, was a member of the Denny Party, the first group of Euro-American settlers in what is now Seattle, Washington. He lived in Seattle from 1851 to 1856 and then again from 1870 till his death.

in 1852, Bell was a delegate at the Monticello Convention that produced a petition to US Congress to split the Oregon Territory, creating the Washington Territory, which would later become the state of Washington.

== Family ==
His first wife, Sarah Ann Peter (daughter of Keziah Peter), died of tuberculosis in June 1856. With her, he had five children:

- Laura Keziah 1842–1887 (married surname: Coffman)
- Olive Julia 1846–1921 (married surnames: Stearns and Stewart)
- Mary Virginia 1847–1931 (married 1872 to George W. Hall)
- Alvina Lavina 1851–1857
- Austin Americus 1854–1889

His second wife, Lucy Gamble, was the younger sister of Sarah Ann.

== Legacy ==
His family is remembered in the name Belltown, a neighborhood immediately north of Downtown where his land claim was located. Bell named many of the streets in the area after his own children, including Bell Street, Virginia and Olive Streets and Olive Way (named for his daughters), and Stewart Street, named for Olive's husband Joseph H. Stewart.
