= PS Eliza Anderson =

American paddle steamer

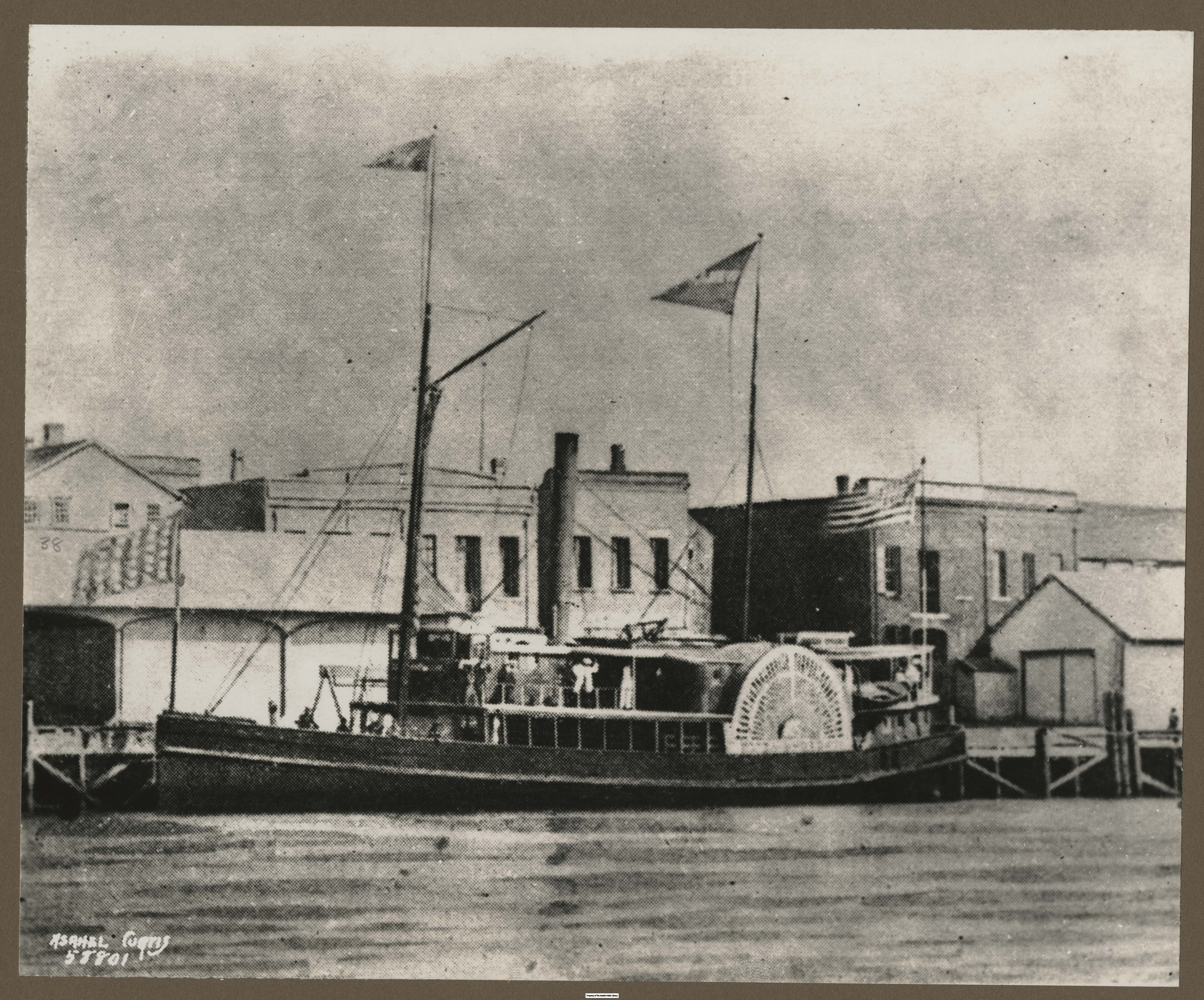
- Eliza Anderson

History
- Name: Eliza Anderson
- Route: Puget Sound, Strait of Georgia, Fraser River, Admiralty Inlet, Strait of Juan de Fuca, Alaska, Columbia River
- Builder: Samuel Farman's yard, foot of Couch Street, Portland, Oregon
- Laid down: Early 1857
- Launched: November 27, 1858
- Maiden voyage: January 2, 1859
- In service: 1859-1898 (with significant intermediate periods out of service)
- Out of service: various times, finally beached and abandoned 1898 at Dutch Harbor
- Fate: Abandoned 1898, Dutch Harbor, Alaska

General characteristics
- Type: inland steamship
- Tonnage: 276
- Length: 140 ft (43 m)
- Beam: 25.5 ft (8 m)
- Depth: 8.8 ft (3 m) depth of hold
- Decks: three (freight, passenger, boat)
- Installed power: low-pressure boiler, single-cylinder walking beam steam engine
- Propulsion: sidewheels
- Sail plan: schooner (auxiliary)

The PS Eliza Anderson operated from 1858 to 1898 mainly on Puget Sound, the Strait of Georgia, and the Fraser River but also for short periods in Alaska. She was generally known as the Old Anderson and was considered slow and underpowered even for the time. Even so, it was said of her that "no steamboat ever went slower and made money faster." She played a role in the Underground Railroad and had a desperate last voyage to Alaska as part of the Klondike Gold Rush.

== Construction ==
Eliza Anderson was launched on November 27, 1858, at Portland, Oregon for the Columbia River Steam Navigation Company. She was a sidewheeler driven by a low-pressure boiler generating steam for a single-cylinder, walking-beam steam engine. She was built entirely of wood, measuring 197 feet long, 25.5 feet on the beam, and rated at 276 tons' capacity.

== Fraser River and Puget Sound service ==
=== Allowed to run in Canadian territory ===
After her trial run on the lower Willamette and Columbia rivers, she was sold to a consortium of John T. Bradford, some Canadian stockholders and three brothers, Tom, John T. and George S. Wright, who were early steamboat operators in the Pacific Northwest. Under Capt. J.G. Hustler, she was brought around to Victoria, arriving in March 1859. Because of the Fraser River Gold Rush, there was a shortage of steamboats in British Columbia in 1858–1859. This had a number of effects on the Canadian west coast, perhaps the most important of which was the establishment of British Columbia as a separate colony from Vancouver Island. For the American steamboats, they benefitted by decision of Canadian governor James Douglas to grant "sufferances" to them to allow them to work on the Victoria to Fraser River route at a levy of $12 per run.

=== Initial work on Fraser River ===
Eliza Anderson arrived just at the right time, making her first run to Fort Langley on the Fraser river, just one day after her arrival at Victoria from the Columbia River. From Fort Langley, the sternwheeler Enterprise, under Capt. Tom Wright (1828–1906), took or at least endeavored to take, goldseekers up to the head of navigation at Yale By March 30, Eliza Anderson had completed two round trips to Fort Langley, and returned to Victoria carrying $40,000 in gold dust.

By May, 1859, three vessels were operating in competition on the Fort Langley route, the Eliza Anderson, the Beaver, and the Governor Douglas. Enterprise's captain, Tom Wright, thought he could do better by moving Enterprise down to the Chehalis River. In June, 1859, Captain Wright brought Enterprise down to Victoria, and arranged in July to have Eliza Anderson tow the sternwheeler around to Grays Harbor, where the Chehalis River flows into the Pacific. Shortly after setting out, Enterprise developed mechanical problems and both vessels were forced to turn back to Esquimalt to await the arrival of new parts for the Enterprise from San Francisco. Returning to Victoria, Eliza Anderson picked up a load of miners bound for Olympia arriving there for the first time on July 9, 1859.

=== Extension of service into Puget Sound ===
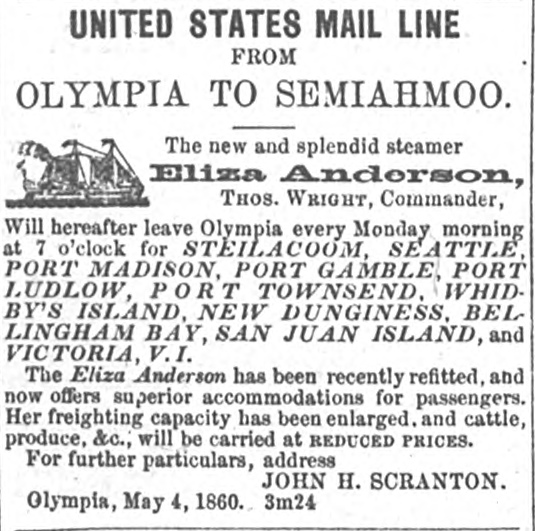
Advertisement for Eliza Anderson, placed in Olympia Pioneer Democrat, Washington Terr., September 28, 1860

Once she arrived in Olympia, her owners put her on the Olympia–Victoria mail run during the month of August, 1859. This was arranged by her agent, John H. Scranton, who had the mail contract. Scranton was also the agent for the steamer Julia, the first sternwheeler to operate on Puget Sound. Scranton seems to have been an interesting character, as he was openly referred to in Olympia's newspaper as "Crazy Jack" and "Commodore Scranton."

In September 1859 Scranton arranged to have Julia take over from the Anderson place on the Olympia–Victoria mail run, which resulted in the Anderson's being returned to the Fraser River route. In mid-September, 1859, a wedding was held on the Anderson just off Queenborough, one of the early settlements on the Fraser River, between Carrie A. Gray, from Hope, British Columbia, and Jacob Kamm, one of the earliest, and later among the most successful of the steamboat men. The couple were already sufficiently noteworthy to warrant a 13-gun salute following the ceremony.

At that time Anderson was fighting one of her many fare wars, this one with the Canadian steamboat Otter. Fares were driven down from 50 cents per passenger and 50 cents per ton of freight. The Otter's owners, who had before advertised rates at $10 per passenger and $12 a ton, were forced to pull Otter off the Fraser run, at least temporarily. With Otter gone, fares shot back up to $6 per passenger and $6 per ton. Beaver and Labouchere made some runs on this route, but neither did well at carrying passengers.

Julia, then running the mail, was a shallow-draft riverine vessel not fit to cross the Strait of Juan de Fuca during the winter. On November 1, 1859, she was taken off the Olympia–Victoria mail run, and shortly thereafter she was replaced by the Anderson, with Capt. Tom Wright (returned from the Chehalis river) as her new master. In December 1859 Captain Wright set the Anderson's schedule at one trip to Olympia and one trip to the Fraser River every week. Every Monday at 7:00 a.m., the Anderson left Olympia bound for Victoria. On Tuesday, she left Victoria for New Westminster, on the Fraser River, and returned to Victoria on Wednesday. On Thursday at 3:00 a.m. she'd steam back to Olympia, laying over there to repeat the journey at the start of the next week.

On the route down Puget Sound, the Anderson stopped at Steilacoom, Seattle, Port Townsend and way ports. Fares on this run were $20 a person, freight $5 to $10 a ton, and cattle could be shipped at $15 a head. The Anderson also benefited from the $36,000 per year mail contract. The Anderson ran on the Victoria run until 1870 when she was replaced by the Olympia. Anderson continued to serve until 1877 as a reserve boat.

== Underground Railroad and the Charles Mitchell case ==
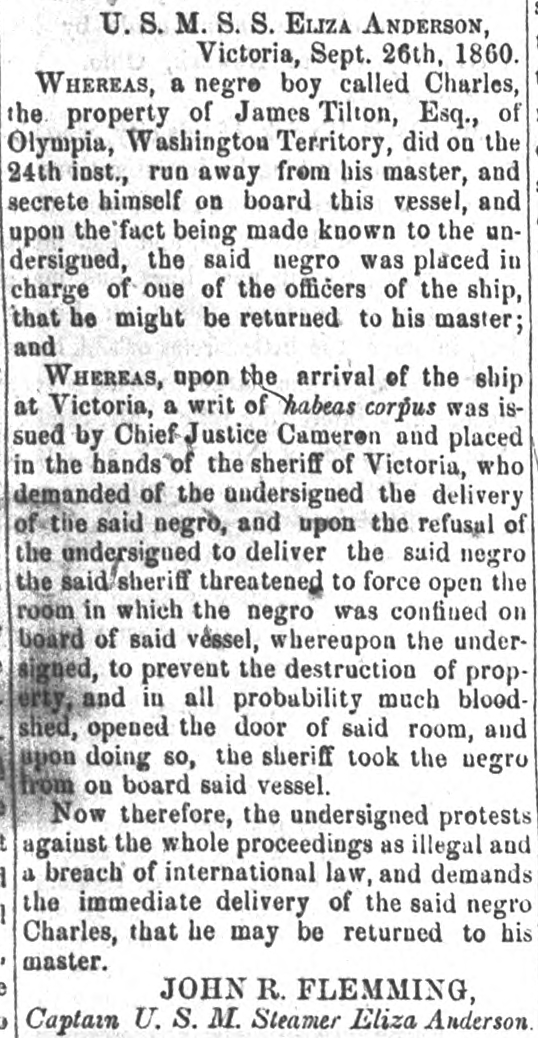
Protest by captain of Eliza Anderson against the Canadian court order freeing a person who had escaped from slavery aboard the steamer

While the events leading up to the Civil War were far away from Puget Sound, they affected the people in the Northwest just the same. The Anderson played her role in these events, including the Underground Railroad. On September 24, 1860, a 14-year-old black youth, named Charles Mitchell, hid on board the Anderson, seeking passage to Canada to escape slavery. He'd been working on the vessel, and another older black man working on the Anderson as a "temporary steward" had helped him find a hiding place on the steamer. He was discovered either at Steilacoom or Seattle, and was not held right away, because he promised to work off his passage. It happened that acting territorial governor McGill and his family were also on the Anderson. Mitchell confided to McGill's son that he intended to desert the ship in Victoria, and the son told the father. Governor McGill then told the ships officers, and when they were just four miles out of Victoria, they seized Mitchell and held him in "close confinement".

Once in Victoria, word got out that Mitchell was being held against his will aboard the Anderson. A group of protesters composed of both white and black citizens of Victoria marched down to the dock. A lawyer presented a petition for a writ of habeas corpus to Chief Justice Cameron, who granted the writ. Armed with the writ, sheriff Naylor and a police constable boarded the Anderson, presented the writ to the officer in charge, and demanded that Mitchell be released to them. The officer in charge told them he didn't think he could do anything until Captain Fleming returned to the vessel. When Captain Fleming returned, he in turn deferred to Governor McGill. What happened next is not entirely clear, but McGill went ashore and either acquiesced in the assertion of the Canadian court's writ over the vessel, or, as the Pioneer Democrat later insisted, protested vociferously against it. Either way, Mitchell was removed from the vessel by the Canadian authorities and became a free man. This was none to the liking of Olympia's newspaper at the time, the Pioneer Democrat, which in an article quite free with racially derogatory terms, stated that war would have been justified to prevent Mitchell's release:

Had there been a United States vessel of war there at the time, the affair would not have been so terminated.

Mitchell had been born in Maryland (a slave state) the son of a white man named Mitchell and an enslaved woman. His mother died and he came to be enslaved by James Tilton, who later was appointed as the territorial surveyor of the Washington Territory. Although in theory the Washington Territory was free soil, the Territorial legislature had declared that after the Dred Scott Decision, the federal government could not bar slavery in the territory. Curiously, although the Pioneer Democrat denounced the action of the Canadian court, blaming the situation on "sharp dressed" black people and misguided whites, the Pioneer Democrat also denied that he was a slave, claiming that he was some type of ward, even though the title of their article used the words "fugitive slave" and the protest by Captain Fleming that it printed described Mitchell as Tilton's "property."

== Operations on the mail route ==
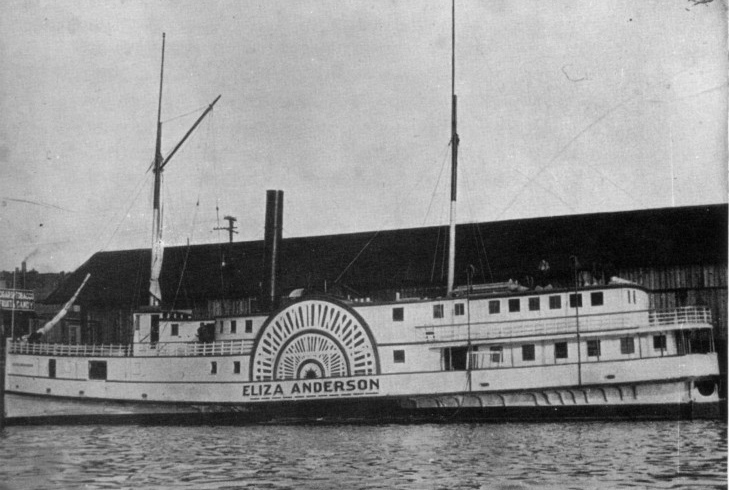
Eliza Anderson in later years, with forward deck enclosed, with upper deck extended fully to bow

=== News of Lincoln's election ===
In the early 1860s, there was no telegraph in Puget Sound, and mail carried by steamboat was the fastest way of transmitting news. Thus, on November 27, 1860, the Anderson brought to Port Townsend news that Abraham Lincoln had been elected president of the United States on November 4, 1860, even though the news had reached Olympia on November 22.

=== Fare wars continue ===
The Anderson's next challenge on the Olympia–Victoria route came from Enterprise, a sidewheeler under the command of Captain Jones. Enterprise had been built in California in 1861, intended for the San Francisco–Stockton run. Her owners brought her north to compete with the Eliza Anderson. The Wrights bested them, by lowering the fare to Victoria to fifty cents, with free meals. This drove Enterprise off the run after six months, and in February 1862, Captain W.A. Mowat paid $60,000 to buy her for the Hudson's Bay Company. The Anderson's owners bought the Enterprise's walking-beam engine and used it to repower their boat. Another would-be competitor, the Josie McNear, similarly faltered in her efforts to compete with the Anderson.

=== Floating financial agency ===
D.B. Finch, once the purser on the vanquished Enterprise, shifted over to the Anderson, and later became a part-owner and master. Captain Finch had a head for figures, and became one of leading bankers in the Washington Territory, conducting finance at every landing called at by the Anderson. Counties in those days were poorly funded, and paid their bills not in cash money, but "warrants", that is to say, paper promises to pay. Finch bought these up for 20 cents on the dollar (he paid more for better-quality debts) and eventually collected most of the principal and interest from them.

=== Cassiar Gold Rush ===
When things were winding down for the Anderson on the Olympia–Victoria route, she was tied up to Percival Dock in Olympia for some time, until the Cassiar Gold Rush in northern British Columbia seemed to offer a chance to make money. She was then fixed up sufficiently to make voyages as far north as Wrangell, Alaska. When the Cassiar rush gave out, the Anderson was returned to Seattle, where she lay between 1877 and 1883, eventually sinking at her moorings.

== Return to service 1883 to early 1890s ==
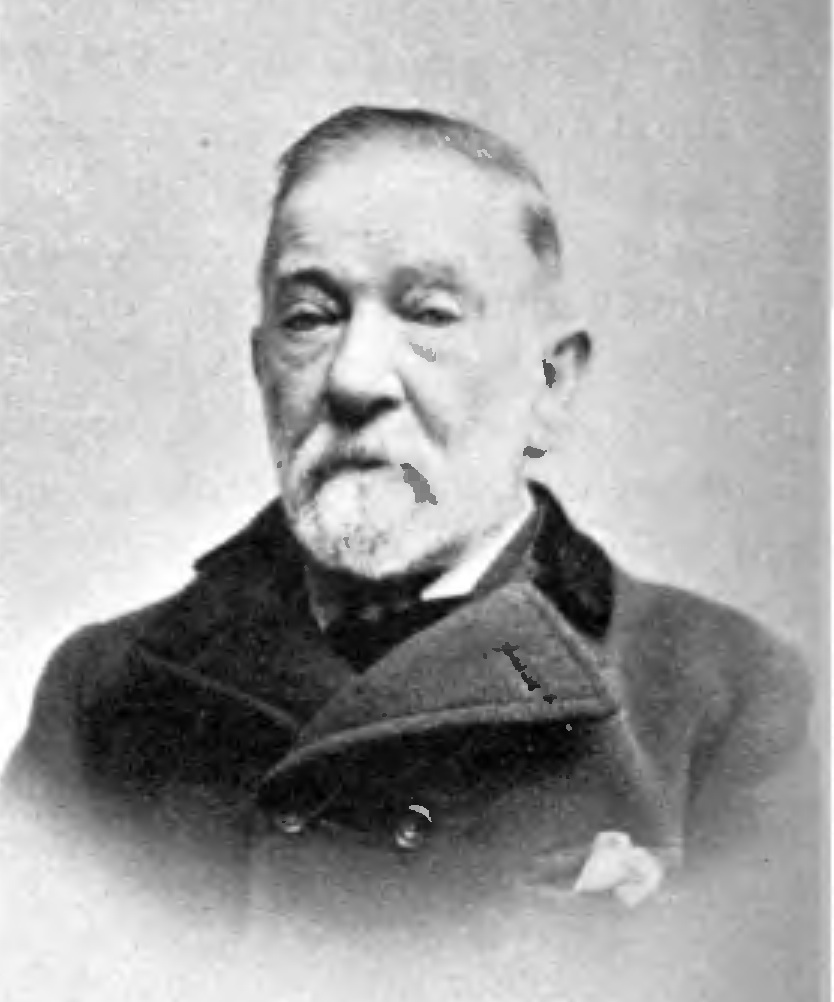
Captain Tom Wright, long-term captain of Eliza Anderson and legendary steamboatman of the Pacific Northwest

In 1883, Captain Wright raised the Anderson, pumped her out, cleaned her up a bit, and put her on the run from Seattle to New Westminster, British Columbia, with Captain E.W. Holmes as her master and O.O. Denny her chief engineer. By this time, the Oregon Railway and Navigation Company was making its bid to monopolize all water and rail transport in the state of Oregon and the Washington Territory. This brought on a rate war with the monopoly's newer sidewheeler, George E. Starr, under Captain George Roberts. In April 1884, Anderson was run hard on the Victoria run against the Oregon company's Olympian, a huge and expensive-to-run sidewheeler.

Anderson ran fares down to $1.00 and was beating both Olympian and Geo. E. Starr until she was seized by the customs collector, Captain H.F. Beecher (youngest child of the famous abolitionist minister Henry Ward Beecher) on charges of bringing in immigrants contrary to the Chinese Exclusion Act. Eventually Captain Wright was able to clear himself of these charges, but with the Anderson having been off the route so long, the competitors had captured all the business. It was said that this broke Captain Wright's heart and his finances. In October, 1886, Captain Wright sold Anderson to the Puget Sound and Alaska Steamship Company, which ran her hard under Capt. J.W. Tarte on the Victoria route again. As late as 1888 she engaged in a steamboat race with another old vessel, the sidewheel steam tug Goliah.Eliza Anderson last ran on Puget Sound under the Northwestern Steamship Company, which was managed by Capt. D.B. Jackson.

== "Floating Coffins" to Alaska ==
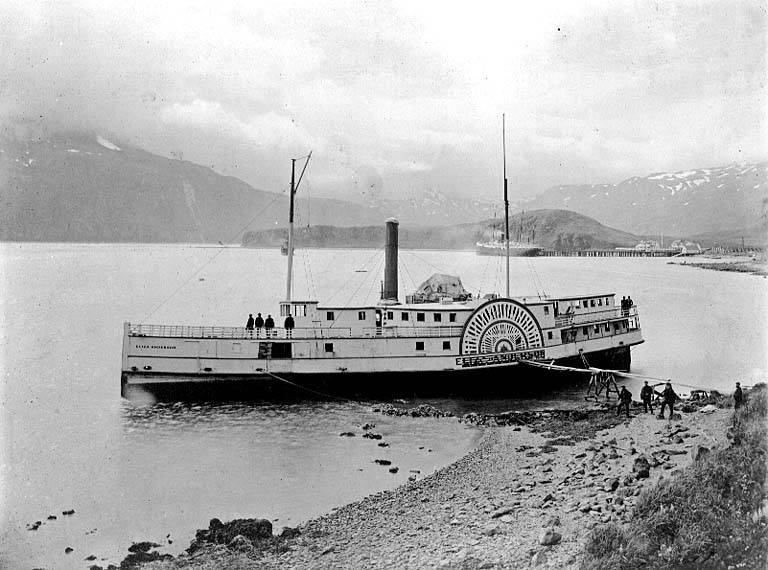
Eliza Anderson as the vessel appeared after reaching Dutch Harbor

The Anderson had been acquired by Daniel Bachhelder Jackson (1833–1895) who was organizing the Washington Steamboat Company. Starting in about 1890, Eliza Anderson was laid up on the Duwamish River during the financial crises of the early 1890s, and would have rotted away there except for the discovery of gold in the Yukon Territory. Gold seekers were willing to book passage on just about anything that floated, and the owners of various dubious craft seized their chance. By this time, Anderson had been tied up for quite some time, and had been functioning not as a steamboat but a roadhouse and gambling hall.

=== The expedition is organized ===
A flotilla of dubious vessels, since described as "floating coffins," was organized, consisting of Eliza Anderson traveling in company with the old (built 1877) but still powerful steam tug Richard Holyoke towing, astoundingly, three craft behind her, the sternwheeler W.K. Merwin, the hulk of the old sidewheeler Politkosky (once a Russian gunboat, now a coal barge), and William J. Bryant, a yachting schooner owned by a wealthy playboy named John Hansen. Merwin, built in 1883, had been laid up from 1894 to 1896 with the Eliza. The Moran shipyard in Seattle finished quick overhaul on the Anderson and she was back in the water on July 31, 1897, and she was somehow able to meet the approval of hulls and boilers inspectors Bryant and Cherry.

=== The voyage begins ===
On August 10, 1897, she began her voyage to Alaska under Capt. Thomas Powers, with about 40 passengers, including a few women and children. The plan was to take the entire fleet up to St. Michael, the only port anywhere near the mouth of the Yukon River, abandon the Anderson there, and then take the Merwin up the Yukon to the gold fields. Merwin herself had her funnel and paddlewheel unshipped for transit and the boat been completely boarded up for the sea voyage. Even so, the company still managed to find 16 people willing to book passage on Merwin. Many considered the ship inspectors' assessment of the Anderson as overly optimistic:

In spite of the opinion of the inspectors, many seafaring men pronounced the Anderson unseaworthy, and dozens of persons who came here from the east to go north on her were influenced by local friends to change their minds and take passage on other boats. Every day since she left Seattle it has been common talk that if she withstood the seas of the North and reached St. Michael in safety she would do something no one expected her to do.

=== Overloaded and underequipped ===
The trip north was from the start a near fiasco. Anderson's owners had oversold her tickets, and the passengers, finding much less space aboard then they'd been promised, were only prevented from throwing the purser overboard by the personal intervention of Captain Powers. Shortly after departure, it was found she was missing a large variety of basic seagoing equipment, such as a compass. Fights broke out among the passengers and crew. When the Eliza Anderson arrived at Comox, British Columbia, incompetent coal loading by her crew caused the steamer to veer out of control into the ship Glory of the Seas sustaining minor damage to one of her paddle guards.

Finally the fleet reached Kodiak, Alaska, still a very long sea journey from St. Michael. There, as the Anderson took on coal, five passengers got off and refused to reboard, convinced the Anderson would sink on the way. The little fleet ran into a gale near Kodiak Island and the Merwin's tow line parted. Merwin, and the 16 unlucky souls aboard her, were only recovered with difficulty by the Holyoke. Holyoke, Merwin and Bryant became separated from the Anderson, and when they arrived at Dutch Harbor, they reported her missing. The revenue cutter Corwin went out to look for the missing sidewheeler.

=== Running out of coal in middle of storm ===
The Anderson it turned out had run out of coal in the middle of the storm. Her lazy crew had not fully coaled the ship at Kodiak and had simply hidden the sacks that they were supposed to haul on board and heave into the coal bins. The crew and passengers were forced to burn the wooden coal bunkers, and eventually the cabin furniture and even the cabin partitions. Passengers were writing notes to loved ones and tossing them overboard in bottles, of which there was an ample supply since most of the boat's stock of whisky had been consumed in an effort to keep up morale.

=== "Ghost helmsman" takes the wheel ===
Just as Captain Powers had given the order to abandon ship (which would have been difficult to execute as the lifeboats had been swept away), the tale goes that a tall, ghostly, white-haired, bearded figure clad in foul weather gear entered the pilot house, took the wheel and steered the ship to safety. Some of the more superstitious said the spectre was the ghost of Captain Tom Wright. The Seattle Post-Intelligencer printed the story as coming from "an old sailor":

Capt. Tom's spirit saw our danger. He knew and loved the Anderson, and that was how it happened that a stranger came out of the storm and brought us safely to land.

It would require an exceptional level of credulity to believe this tale, as Capt. Tom Wright, whose "ghost" supposedly appeared on the Anderson in 1897, was still very much alive and did not die until 1906. Still the story made the rounds among the superstitious and stuck around for a long time.

=== Safety reached on Kodiak Island ===
Ghost helmsman or not, the ship was forced to run for shelter on Kodiak Island. Fortuitously, she found an unused cannery on the island, complete with 75 tons of coal. (Here is where the "Ghost Helmsman" mysteriously vanished.) This supply was quickly seized upon by the Anderson's company, and with it the boat was somehow able to stagger on to Dutch Harbor.

== Abandonment and final loss ==
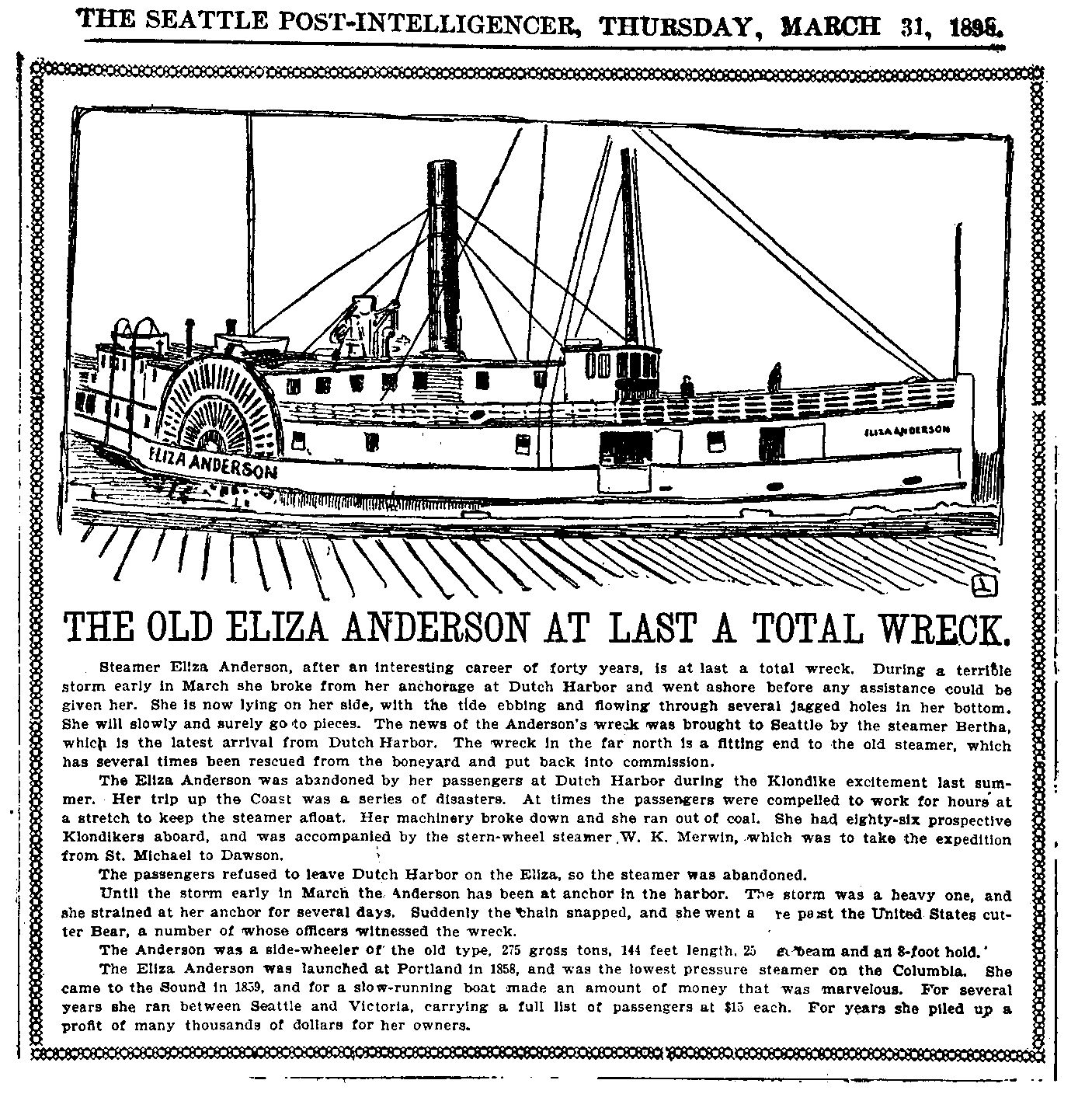
Newspaper story from 1898 regarding final wreck of Eliza Anderson

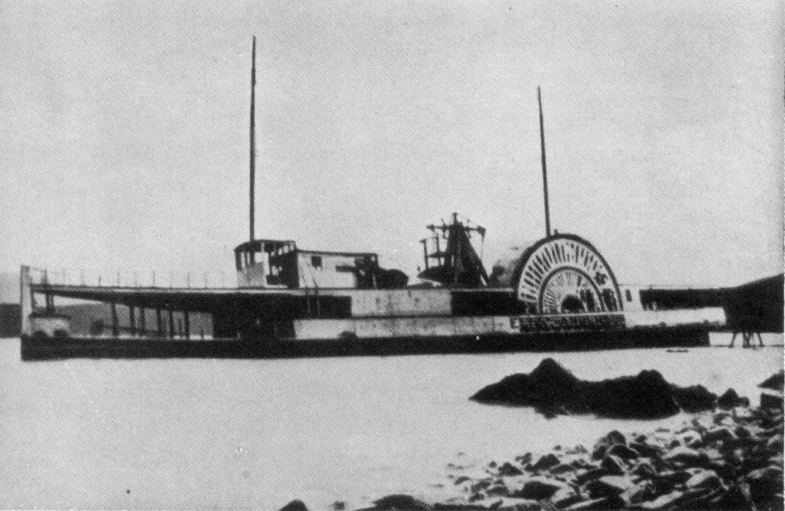
Hulk of Eliza Anderson

At Dutch Harbor, following a steam pipe explosion and collision with a dock, the Anderson was abandoned by her passengers, who shifted over to a steam schooner to reach the mouth of the Yukon River. Anderson stayed moored at Dutch Harbor until March 1898 when a storm washed her up on a beach where she gradually disintegrated. Of her fate, the Seattle Post-Intelligencer wrote, on March 31, 1898:

The old Eliza Anderson, after an interesting career of 40 years, is at last a total wreck. During a terrible storm early in March she broke from her anchorage at Dutch Harbor and went ashore before any assistance could be given her. She is now lying on her side, with the tide ebbing and flowing through several jagged holes in her bottom. She will surely and slowly go to pieces. The news of the Anderson's wreck was brought to Seattle by the steamer Bertha. ... The wreck in the far north is a fitting end to the steamer, which has several times been rescued from the boneyard and put back into commission.

== Mystery of the Ghost Helmsman solved ==
In 1956, Thomas Wiedeman Sr., who had been on board the Anderson during her last Alaska trip, wrote in an article that in 1953, he'd been introduced to Joe Braddock of San Francisco, who had been a crewman on the Corwin when the revenue cutter had set out in 1897 to search for the missing Anderson. Braddock told Wiedeman that in the course of the search, he'd questioned two brothers, Erik and Olaf Heestad, on Kodiak Island. They'd been operating the cannery near where the Anderson had sought safety. When Anderson left Kodiak after coaling, Erik had stowed himself away on board, hoping to get to Dutch Harbor to ask an uncle for a loan to restart their business. Afraid of discovery and arrest, he hid until the Anderson was in such terrible straits that it appeared only he could save the ship. Once they reached safety, his brother Olaf rowed out from shore and took him off the ship. They remained at their out-of-the-way cabin until the Anderson finally coaled and left for Dutch Harbor.
