= George W. Hall =

American politician

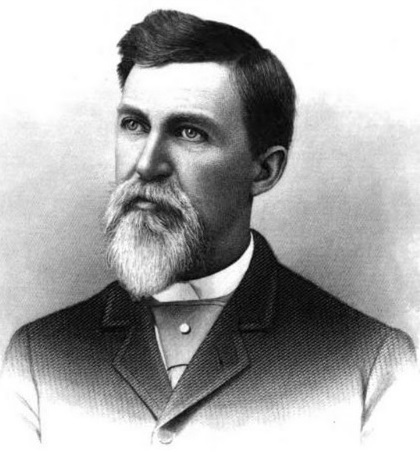
- From 1891's History of Seattle Washington, by Frederic James Grant

18th Mayor of Seattle
- In office December 9, 1891 – March 31, 1892
- Preceded by: Harry White
- Succeeded by: James T. Ronald

Personal details
- Born: c. 1840 Jackson County, West Virginia (then Virginia)
- Occupation: Politician

George W. Hall (born c. 1840) was an American businessman and politician who served as mayor of Seattle in the 1890s.

== Biography ==
Born in Jackson County, West Virginia (then Virginia) in about 1840, he was the son of William Hall, a native of Ohio, and Mary (Cohen) Hall. He was educated in Virginia, and apprenticed as a patternmaker. During his early 20s he traveled through several western states and territories and worked as miner. He moved to Seattle in 1869, and during his career, Hall operated at various times a construction business, a furniture making company, a real estate development office, and other ventures.

A Republican, Hall served several terms on the city council. He served as Mayor of Seattle from 1891 until 1892. Hall was appointed on December 9, 1891, following the resignation of Harry White. On March 18, 1892, James T. Ronald was elected as his replacement.

== Family ==
In 1872, Hall married Mary Virginia Bell, the daughter of William Nathaniel Bell, one of Seattle's founders. Their children included Edna, Ivy, Olive, and Aidine.

== See also ==
- List of mayors of Seattle

== Sources ==
=== Books ===
- Grant, Frederic James (1891). History of Seattle, Washington. New York, NY: American Publishing and Engraving Co. p. 460.
