= Belltown, Seattle =

Most densely populated neighborhood in Seattle, Washington

- Seattle Neighborhood
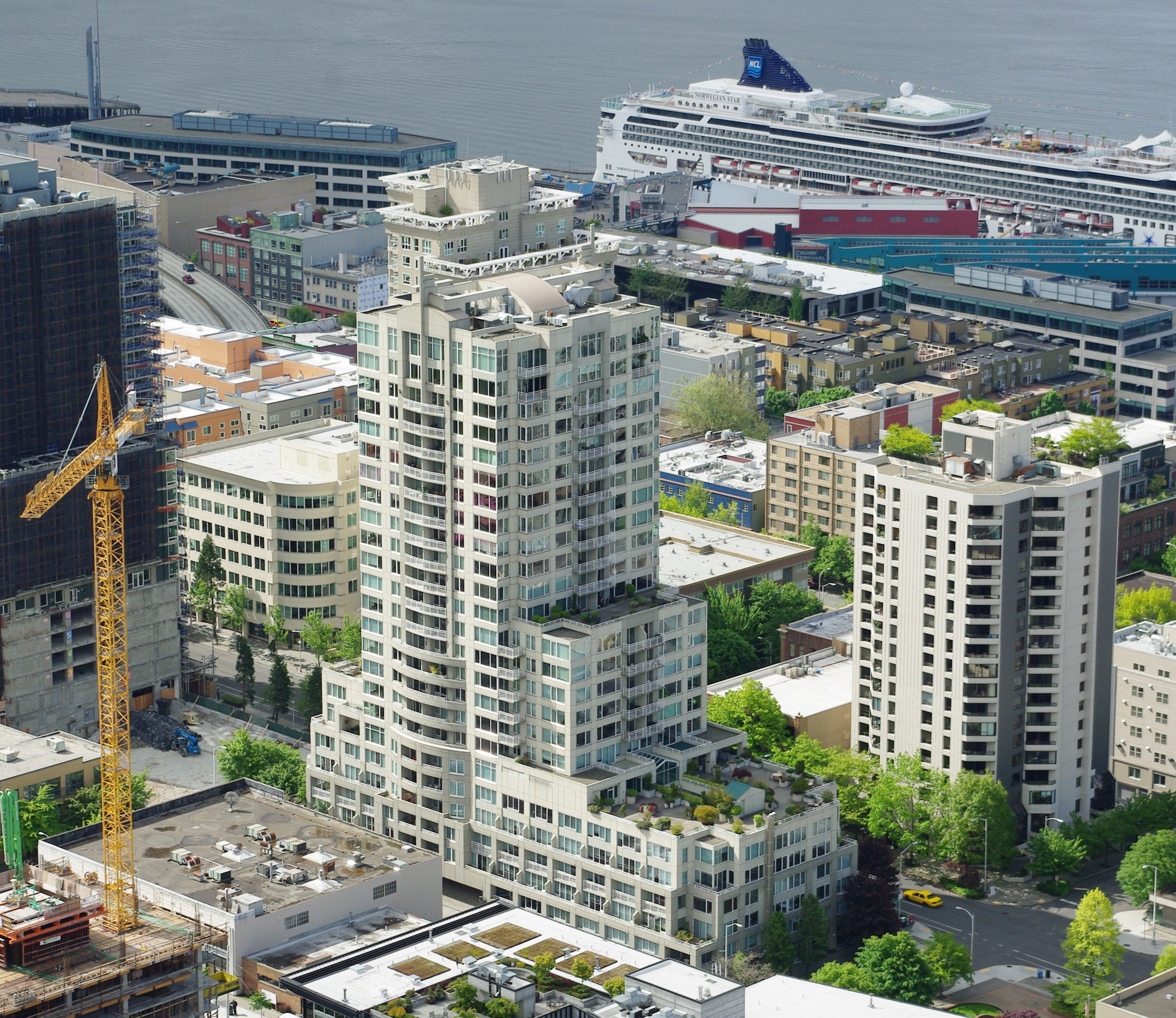
- Aerial view of Belltown looking at 2600 Second Avenue (presently Seattle Heights Condos)

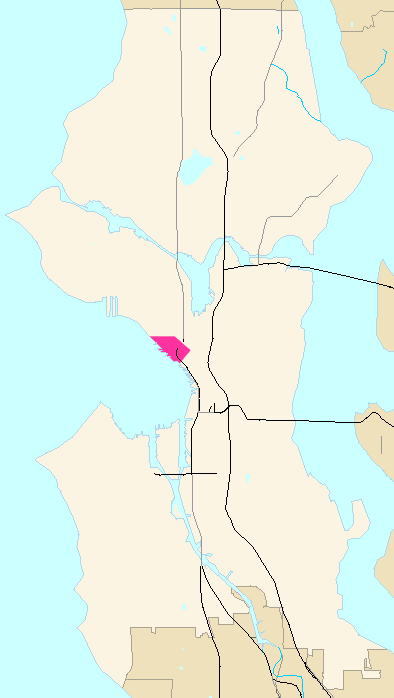
- Belltown Highlighted in Pink
- Coordinates: 47°36′52″N 122°20′41″W
- Country: United States
- State: Washington
- County: King
- City: Seattle
- Named for: William Nathaniel Bell
- ZIP Code: 98121
- Area Code: 206, 564

Belltown is the most densely populated neighborhood in Seattle, Washington, United States, located on the city's downtown waterfront on land that was artificially flattened as part of a regrading project. Formerly a low-rent, semi-industrial arts district, in recent decades it has transformed into a neighborhood of trendy restaurants, boutiques, nightclubs, and residential towers as well as warehouses and art galleries. The area is named after William Nathaniel Bell, on whose land claim the neighborhood was built.

Belltown is home to Antioch University, City University of Seattle, and the Seattle School of Theology & Psychology. It lies directly west of the Denny Triangle neighborhood, where online retailer Amazon's three office towers house its downtown headquarters, and where the Cornish College of the Arts is located.

== Businesses ==
Although many new businesses have eclipsed older ones, some venerated establishments still draw crowds of loyal patrons. Some of the classic, old Seattle nightspots in Belltown are: The Rendezvous, The Lava Lounge, Ohana, The Crocodile Cafe, and Shorty's. At one time Alaska Airlines had its headquarters in what is now Belltown. The original Ace Hotel was founded in Belltown and is still active today

== Geography ==
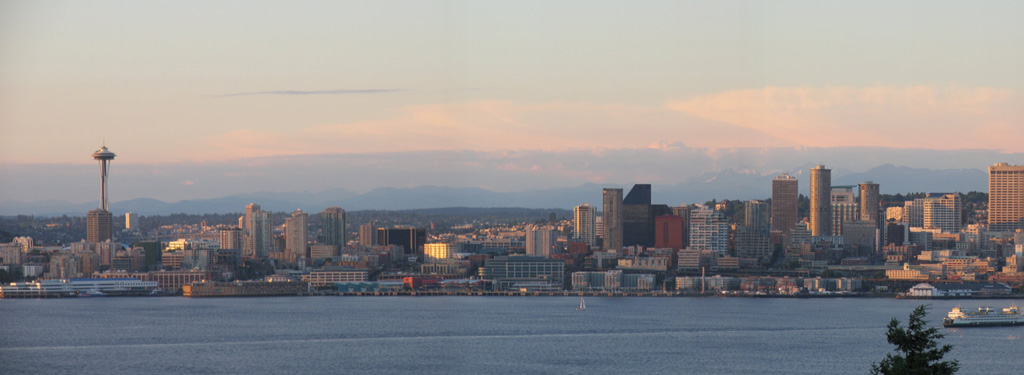
Belltown as seen from West Seattle

The neighborhood is bounded on the north by Denny Way, beyond which lies Seattle Center, Lower Queen Anne, and Queen Anne Hill, on the southwest by Elliott Bay, on the southeast by Virginia Street, beyond which lies the Pike Place Market and the rest of Downtown, and on the northeast by 5th Avenue, beyond which lies the Denny Triangle.

All of its northwest- and southeast-bound streets are major thoroughfares (Alaskan Way and Elliott, Western, 1st, 2nd, 3rd, and 4th Avenues); major northeast- and southwest-bound thoroughfares are Broad, Wall, and Battery Streets. The State Route 99 tunnel runs under Belltown for a number of blocks as it connects the Alaskan Freeway to Aurora Avenue North.

North on Western Avenue at Vine Street is the Belltown P-Patch and the Cottage Park. These single family homes built in 1916 are the last of 11 on the 1/4 block. The Cottages mark the 1850s shoreline and are the last remaining wood framed residences in downtown Seattle. The Belltown P-Patch provides gardening opportunities through the City of Seattle P-Patch program.

== Sculpture garden ==
The Olympic Sculpture Park, a public sculpture garden of 9 acres (36,000 m^{2}) adjacent to Myrtle Edwards Park, is located on the northern edge of the Belltown waterfront. The park features contemporary pieces, various ecosystems with plants indigenous to the Pacific Northwest, and a restored beach and seawall. The park's construction was funded entirely with private donations and is operated by the Seattle Art Museum. Unlike other such parks in the United States, the Olympic Sculpture Park is unwalled, and admission is free.

== Transportation ==
Belltown is traversed by multiple high-frequency transit routes operated by King County Metro, including light Bus Rapid Transit (BRT) services branded RapidRide. As of 2022, RapidRide route E, which provides frequent service from North Seattle to Downtown Seattle via Aurora Avenue and through Belltown, has the highest ridership of all of King County Metro's transit services. Westlake Station is located just to the south of Belltown and is served by Sound Transit's 1 Line, part of the Seattle metropolitan area's regional light rail system.

== "Film Row" ==
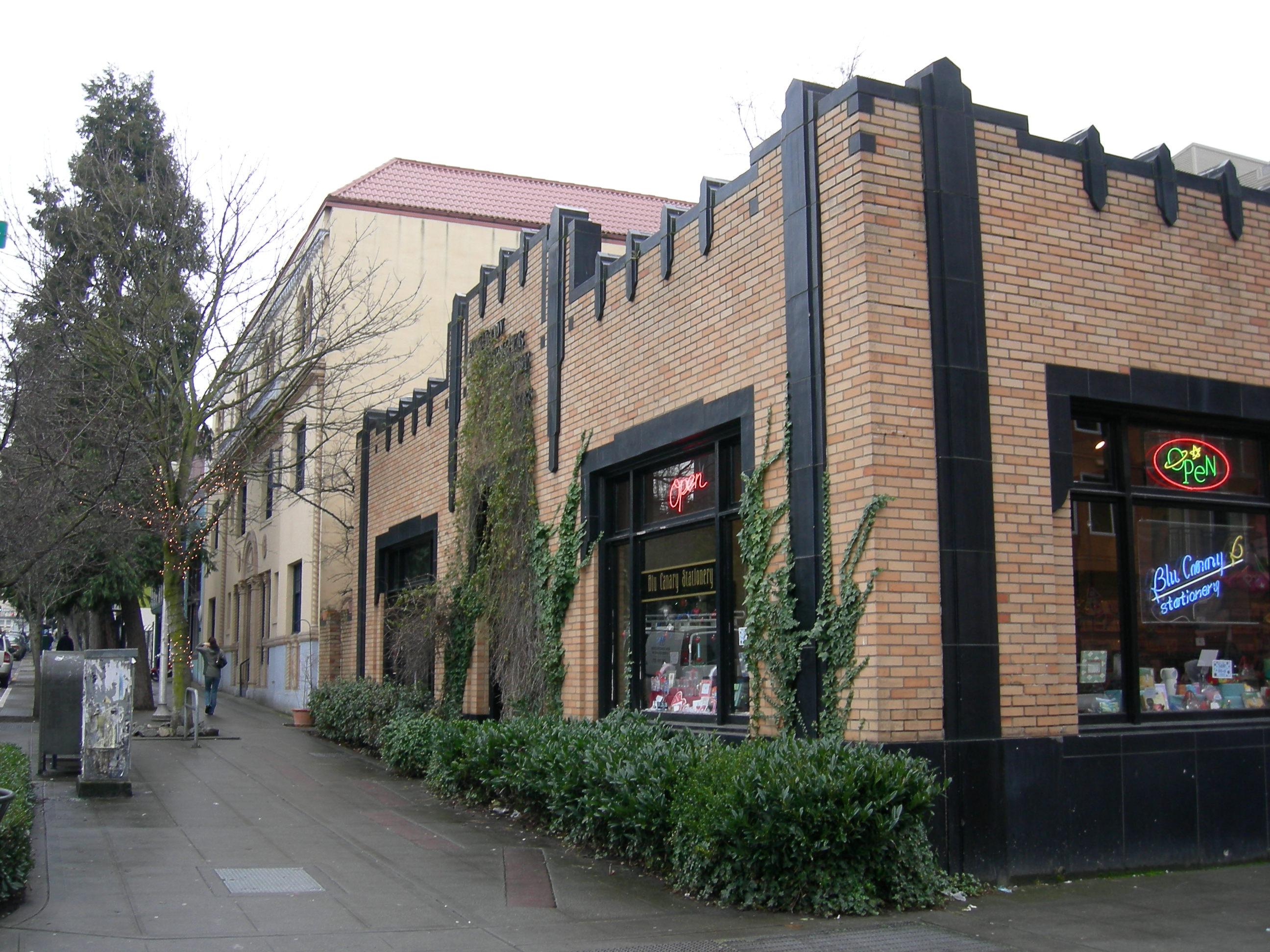
The McGraw-Kittenger-Case Building at the corner of Second and Battery, and behind that the William Tell Hotel. Beyond that, the former National Theater Building, now painted blue, can barely be seen

The Pathé Theatre at 717 1st Avenue opened around 1910 and a Pathé Exchange debuted at 2113 3rd Avenue. In August 1916, the Mutual Exchange opened at 3rd and Virginia in a building with an auditorium.

The first building constructed for Seattle's burgeoning film industry and in what would become "Film Row" in Belltown opened in 1922 in the Pathe Building designed by Julian F. Everett at 2025 3rd Avenue (which was demolished in 2016). Eventually, silent-era film exchanges in Seattle serviced approximately 470 commercial movie theaters throughout Washington, Idaho, Montana and Oregon. Concern about the flammability of nitrocellulose film resulted in the concentration of film exchanges in this single neighborhood, as a zoning issue.

Polk's 1923 Seattle City Directory shows 26 listings for "Motion Picture Machines and Supplies". All except the U.S. Army Motion Picture Service are within one block of the corner of Virginia Street and Third Avenue.

From the 1920s into at least the 1960s, Second Avenue in Belltown was home to Seattle's second "Film Row." In 1928, just after the era of talkies began, the role of the Second Avenue film row was consolidated by the erection of the terra-cotta-ornamented, art deco Film Exchange Building (FEB, also known as the Canterbury Building) designed by Seattle architect Earl W. Morrison; it covered an entire block on the west side of Second Avenue, from Battery Street to Wall Street.

By 1930, Polk lists only 18 Seattle film exchanges; while Kodascope Libraries is at 111 Cherry Street in the Pioneer Square neighborhood, all of the others are on Second Avenue within a block of Battery Street (save only Columbia Pictures at First and Battery). This situation was essentially unchanged in 1948: 19 entries under "Motion Picture Distributors and Film Exchanges", 15 of them in this same two blocks, and two of the others elsewhere in Belltown.

Nothing remains of the FEB. Universal Pictures was the last film business to pull out, in 1980. The building closed in 1991 and was demolished in 1992. Immediately south, the block of Second Avenue on the other side of Battery still contains many remnants of the Film Row era. The Jewel Box theater of the Rendezvous bar is the one remaining screening room in the neighborhood, but several other buildings remain. The McGraw-Kittenger-Case building on the southwest corner of Second and Battery was once the MGM building, and is now a bar and restaurant.

Just south of it is the former William Tell Hotel, once the film industry favorite, later low-income housing, and now a traveler's hostel. Farther down the block, the former National Theater Building now houses several small businesses. At 2332 First Avenue, Paramount's former film exchange building has housed the Catholic Seaman's Club since 1955; the ground floor is now the Sarajevo restaurant and lounge, and the Catholic Seaman's Club is upstairs.
