= James T. Ronald =

American politician

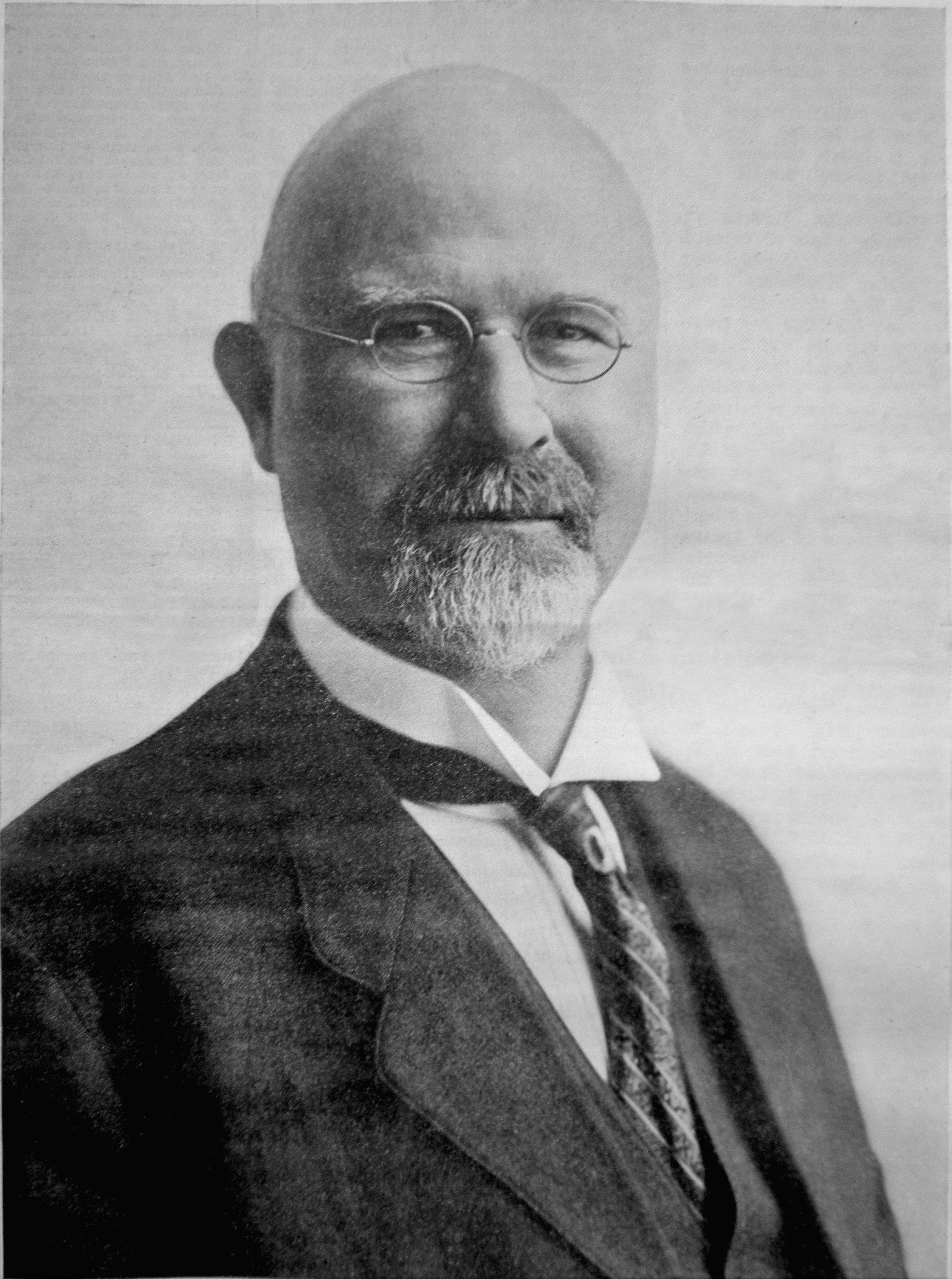

19th Mayor of Seattle
- In office March 31, 1892 – March 19, 1894
- Preceded by: George W. Hall
- Succeeded by: Byron Phelps

Personal details
- Born: April 8, 1855 Caledonia, Missouri
- Died: December 27, 1950 (aged 95) Seattle, Washington
- Party: Democratic

James T. Ronald (April 8, 1855 – December 27, 1950) was an American politician who served as the Mayor of Seattle from 1892 to 1894.
