= Blakely Harbor =

Inlet in Washington, United States

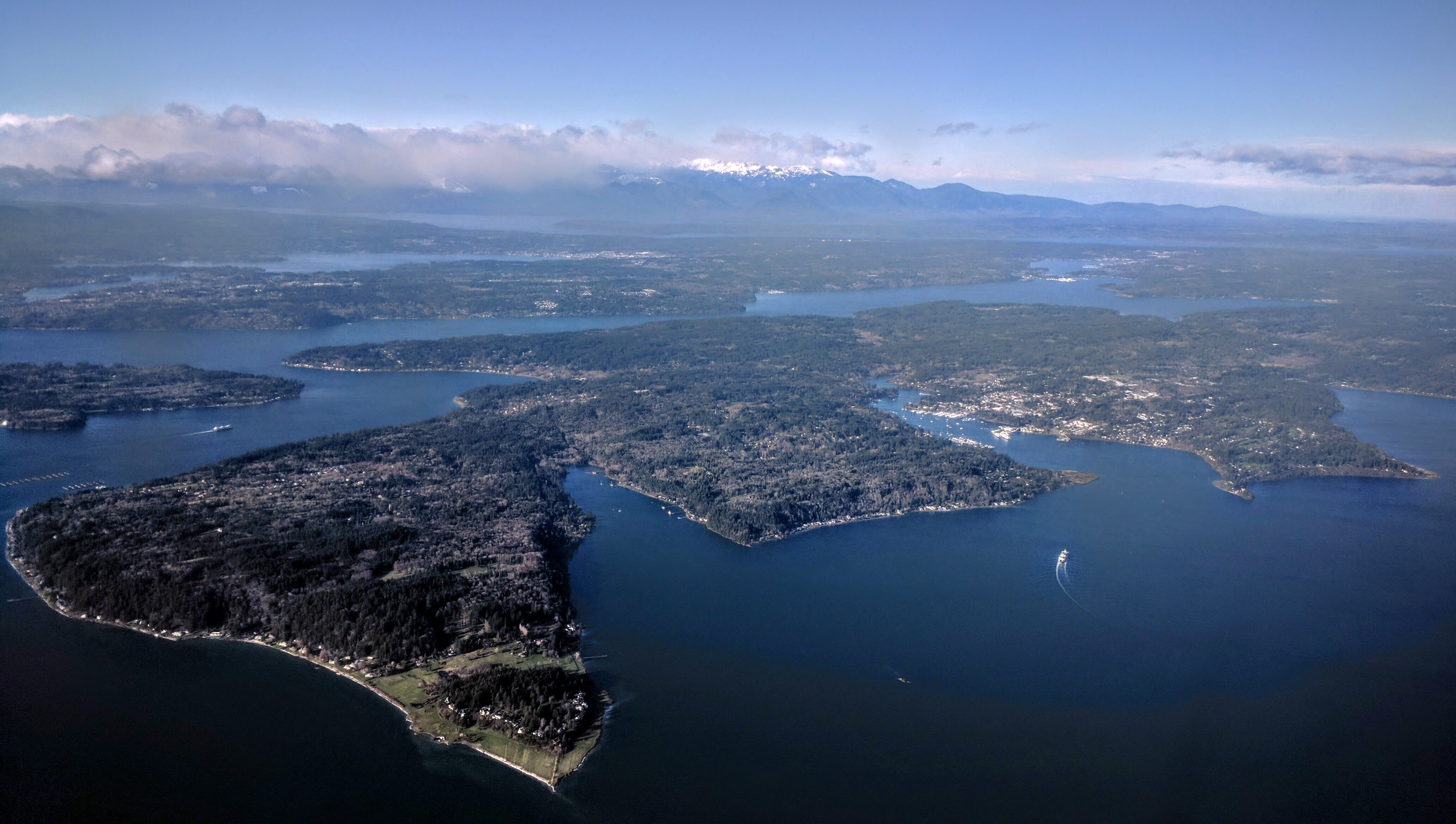
Aerial view of Bainbridge Island from the southeast, showing the ferry from Seattle making the first of two turns to bring it into Eagle Harbor, with Blakely Harbor to its left

Blakely Harbor is an inlet on the east shore of Bainbridge Island, Washington, south of Eagle Harbor.

Blakely Harbor Park, a 40-acre public space on Bainbridge Island, Washington, was established in 1999 after a concerted effort by the Bainbridge Island Metropolitan Park and Recreation District and the Bainbridge Island Land Trust to preserve the site of the historic Port Blakely Mill, once among the world's largest sawmills.

Also known as Port Blakely, the harbor was once home to a major lumber mill business, the Port Blakely Mill Company, established 1864 (162 years ago). The mill burned to the ground in 1888 and again in 1907, but was rebuilt each time. The mill was "once known as the largest, highest-producing sawmill in the world". Blakely Harbor is now a residential neighborhood. The mill pond and ruins of the mill are accessible to the public in a city park at the west end of the harbor.
