= Robert Moran (shipbuilder) =

American shipbuilder and mayor of Seattle

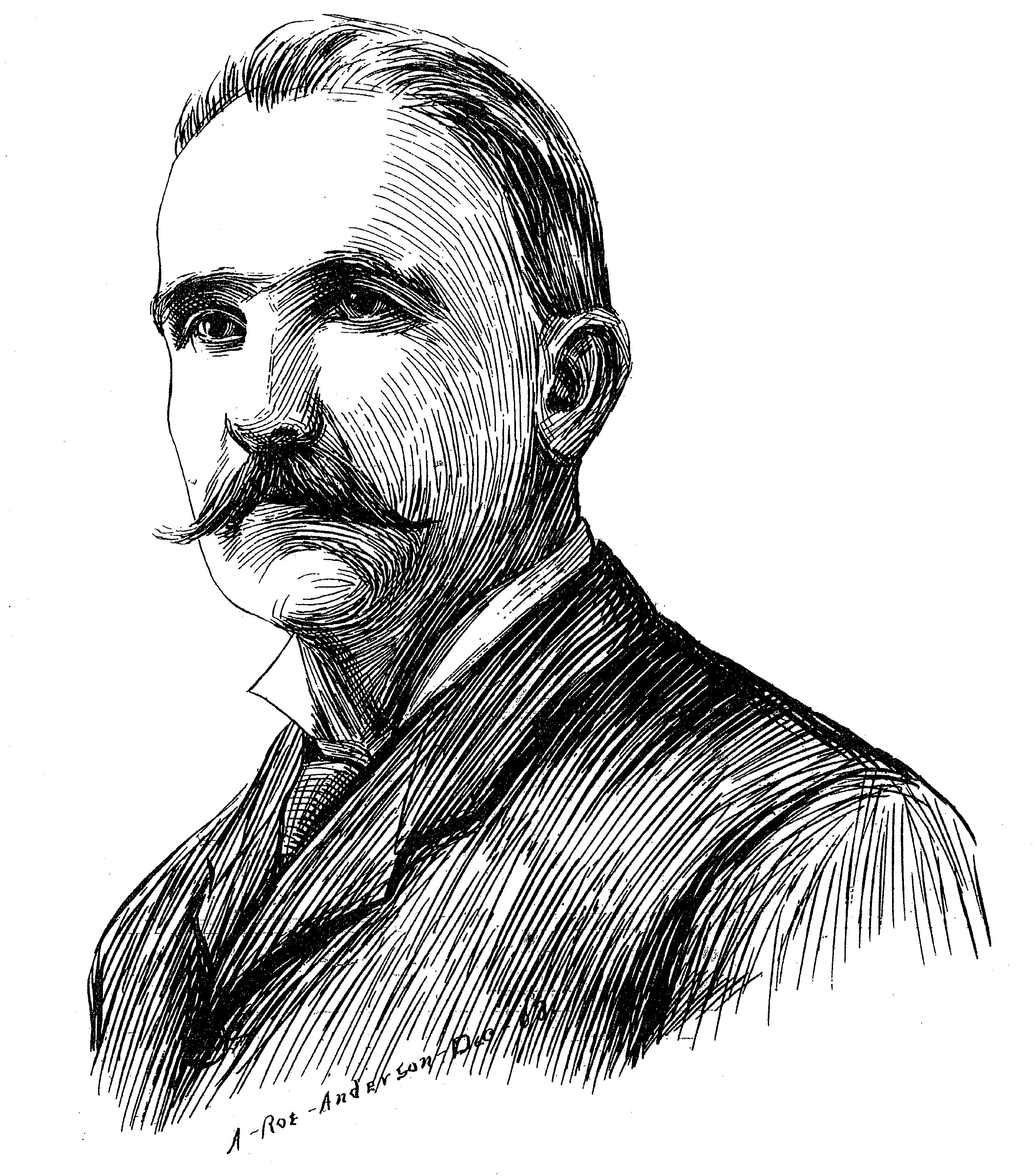
1903 portrait of Moran by A. Roe Anderson

Robert Moran (January 26, 1857 – March 27, 1943) was a Seattle shipbuilder who served as the city's mayor from 1888 to 1890. Today he is primarily remembered for Moran Brothers Co. shipbuilders, his work as mayor to rebuild after the Great Seattle Fire, and his large estate on Orcas Island, which became a resort and later Moran State Park.

== Biography ==
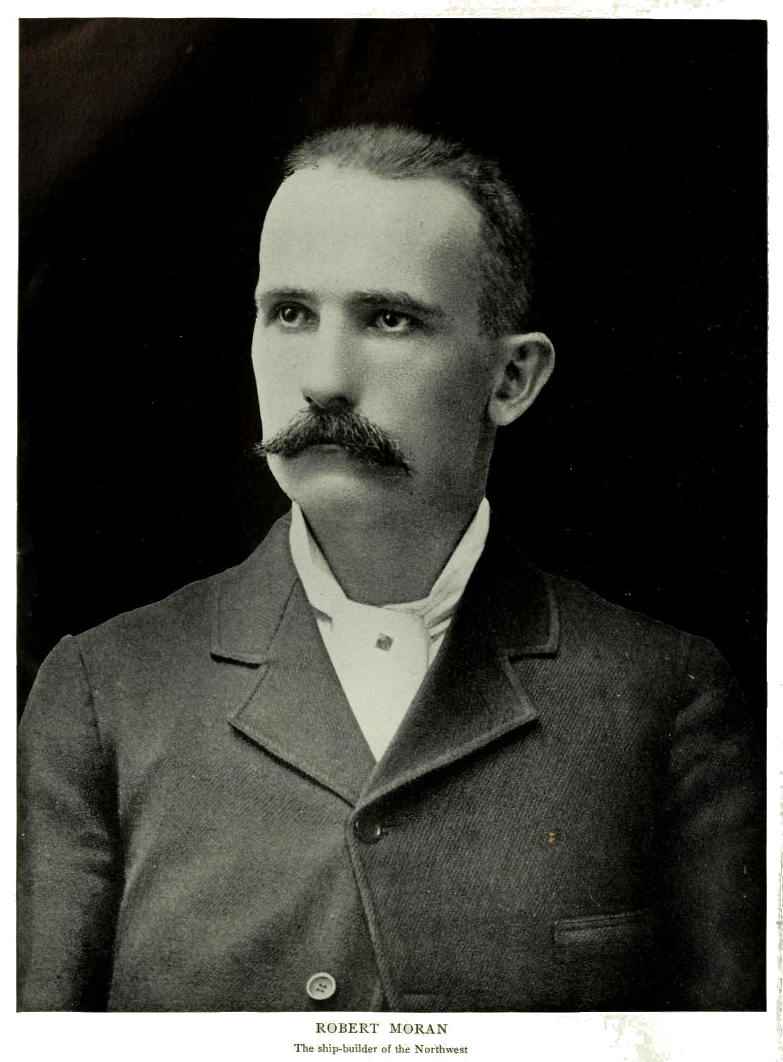

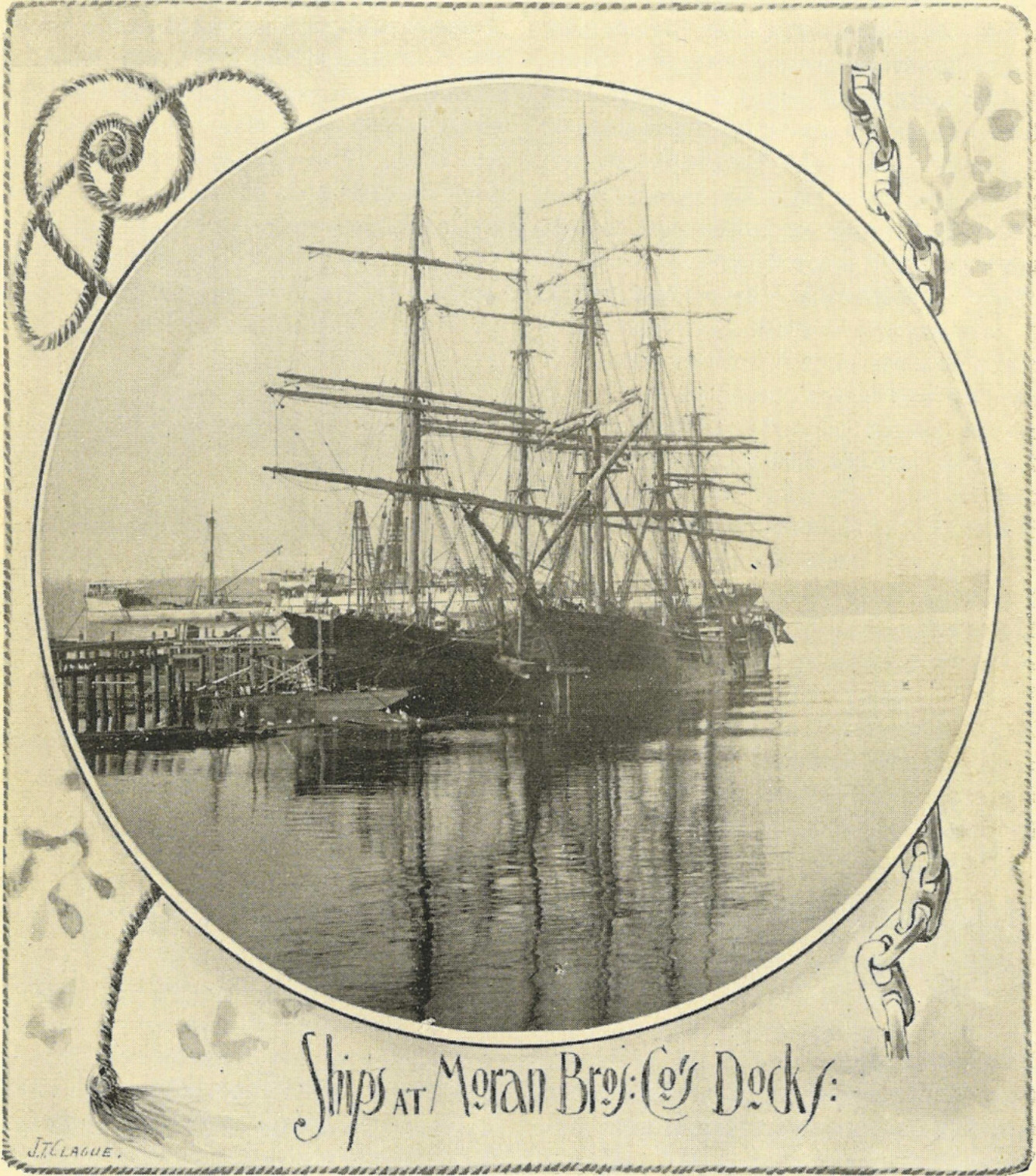
Two tall ships at the Moran Bros. Company docks, late 19th century

A native of New York City, Moran was 18 when, in 1875, he arrived penniless in Seattle, a frontier outpost in the Pacific Northwest, which had been settled in November 1851, and only incorporated between 1865 and 1869. After years of working on steamboats he earned enough money to send for his family and, by 1882, he and his brothers started a marine repair business at Yesler's wharf. The Moran Brothers Company prospered during the Klondike Gold Rush when, among other projects, they built a fleet of twelve 176-foot (54 m) paddlewheel riverboats (hull Nos. 9–20), which were successfully delivered to the Yukon River.

In 1888, 31-year-old Robert Moran was elected the Republican mayor of Seattle. In those early years, the town's mayors were elected in July for a one-year term. Near the end of his service, on June 6, 1889, the Great Seattle Fire destroyed most of the central business district. Moran's leadership in coordinating the recovery activities won him a second term in the following month's election. Through the period of his mayoralty, he was instrumental in the successful rebuilding of businesses, including Moran Bros., which were destroyed in the fire. His political connections were also very helpful in securing government contracts for his shipbuilding company. Among his administration's rebuilding efforts was the public overhaul of Seattle's water system and the establishment of a savings and loan association, which later became Washington Mutual.

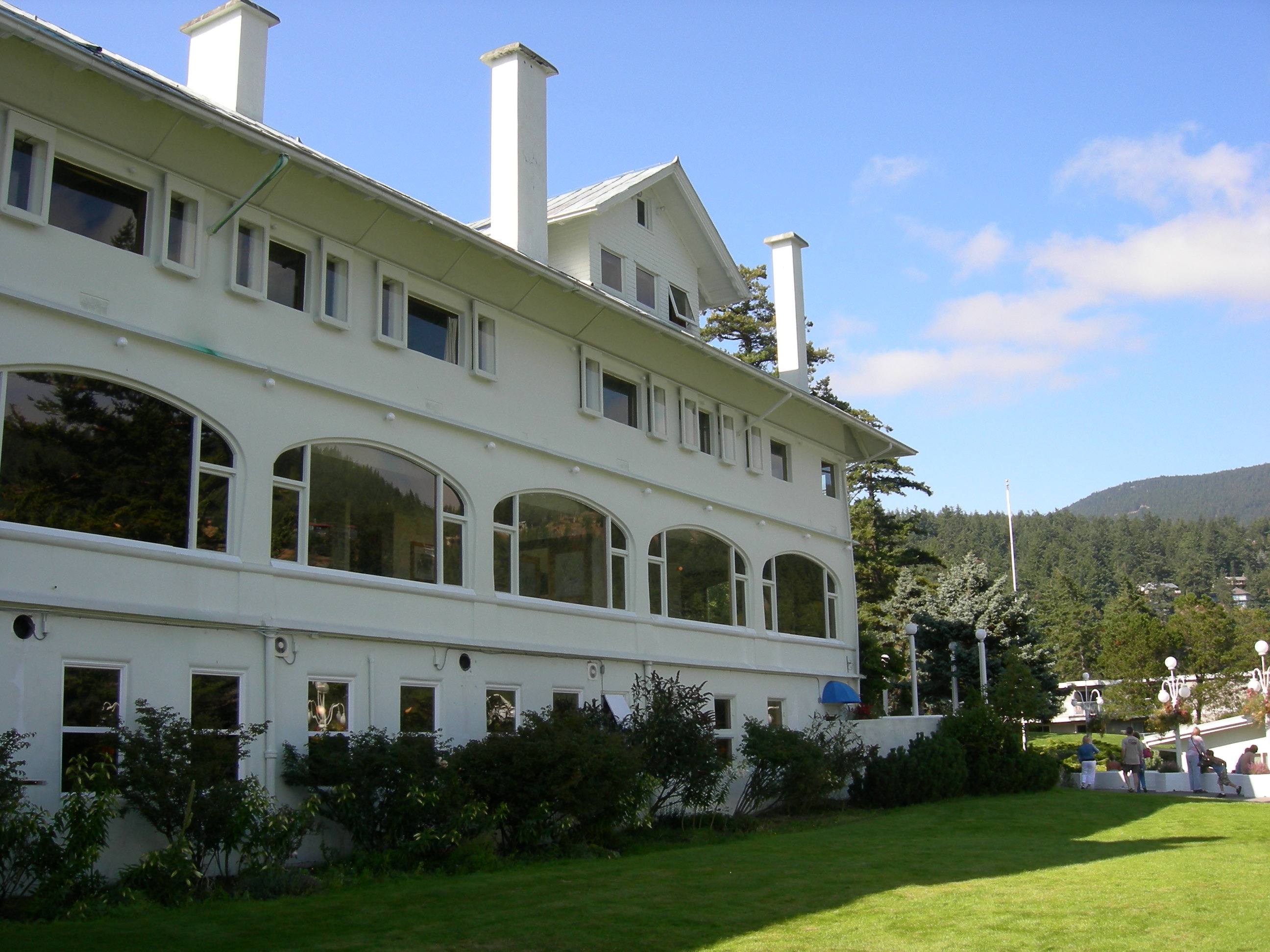
Moran Mansion “Rosario” (2007)

Following his mayoral service, Moran devoted all his efforts to his shipbuilding business and, in 1904, climaxed his career with his shipyard's launch of the USS Nebraska, Washington state's only battleship. He was told in 1905 that he had one year to live, and retreated to Orcas Island in Puget Sound's San Juans, where he built the Moran Mansion—surrounded at that time by 7,800 acres (32 km^{2}) of land—that is now the centerpiece of Rosario Resort. He sold the shipbuilding company for an undisclosed price between US$2.5 and 3.5 million in 1906.

Moran spent the remainder of his life in retirement on Orcas Island. In 1916, he had a 132-foot (40 m) yacht built called the Sanwan, though it seems that ship saw little use. Influenced by chance encounters with conservationist John Muir, he donated 2,700 acres (1,100 ha) of Rosario to the state of Washington for preservation, which became Moran State Park in 1921. Following the death of his wife in 1932, he put the estate up for sale, however when he did finally sell it years later, it was at a fraction of its cost. From there he moved into a smaller home on Orcas. He died in 1943 and was buried in the Moran family plot in Lake View Cemetery in Seattle.

== Bibliography ==
- Christopher M. Peacock (1985). Rosario Yesterdays. Rosario Productions. ISBN 9780961497002.

Political offices
Preceded by Thomas T. Minor	Mayor of Seattle; 1888–1889	Succeeded by Harry White
