= David Levine (politician) =

American politician

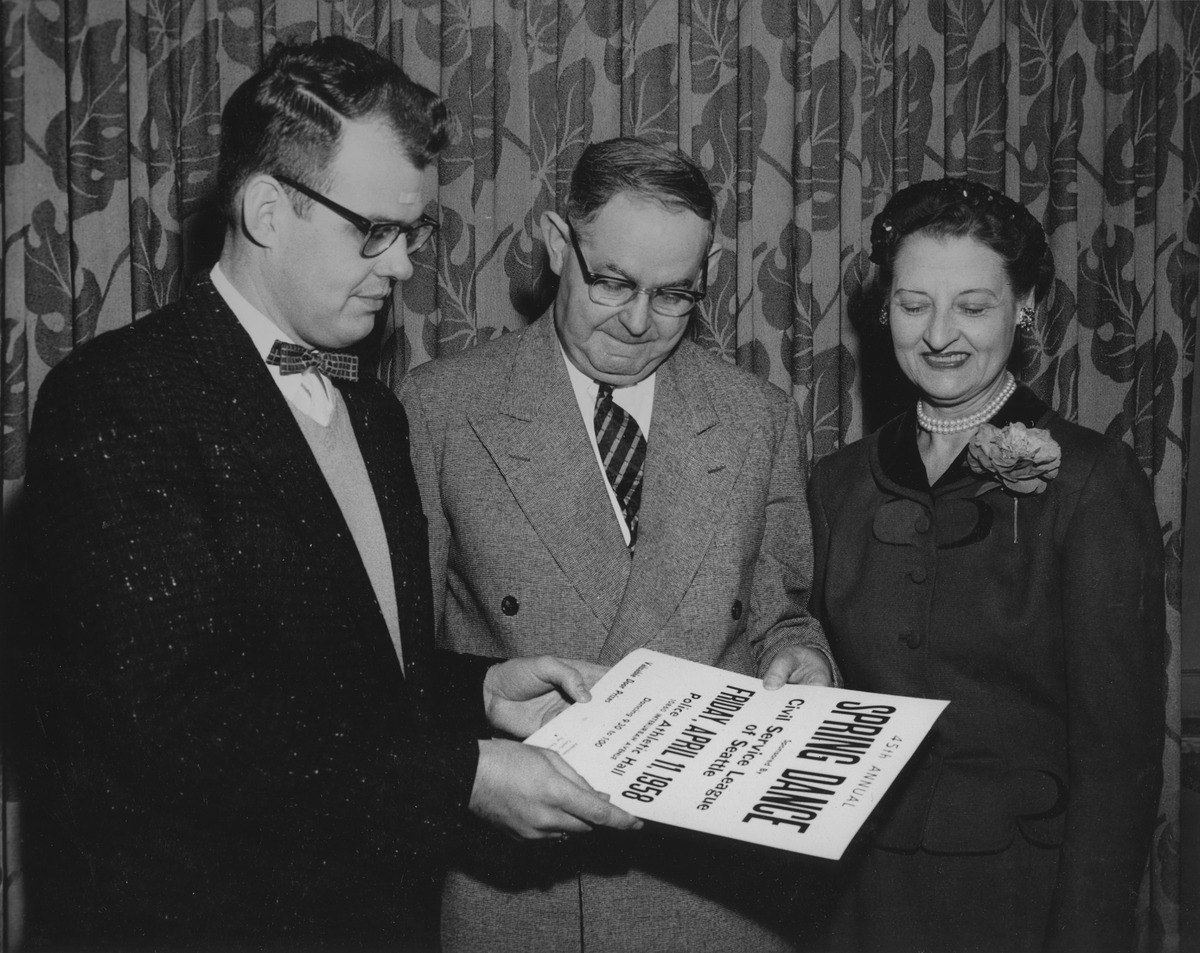
Levine (center) in 1958 in his capacity as president of the Civil Service League, flanked by League treasurer Ben Merrill and Mrs. Merrill.

David Levine (March 18, 1883 – May 9, 1972) was a Seattle, Washington politician. He served on the Seattle City Council from 1931 to 1962 (with a one-year interruption in the mid-1930s) including several stints as council president. On retirement, he received the title of Council President Emeritus, unique in the city's history.

== Life ==
Born in Kyiv in 1883, Levine came to Seattle in 1900. Prior to his political career, he worked as a jeweler and watchmaker. In 1929, he served on a City Planning Commission, a role he would play again from 1964 to 1970 after retiring from the city council. An active trade unionist, as a young man he was a member of the Socialist Labor Party and later was president of the Seattle Central Labor Council, international vice president of the Jewelry Workers' Union, (a role in which he continued while in public office) and editor of State Labor News. From 1953, he also served as a director of the Seattle Federal Savings & Loan Association. He was also a Freemason, a member of the Order of the Eastern Star and the Elks Club, and of Temple de Hirsch, a Reform Jewish congregation. Despite his membership in a Reform congregation, he often attended an Orthodox synagogue on the High Holy Days.

In the 1920s, Levine had supported reformist mayor Bertha K. Landes and, according to his own account was surprised when he was appointed to the City Planning Commission by Mayor Frank E. Edwards, her successor who defeated her in an election. Levine was appointed to the city council July 14, 1931 to fill a vacancy left when Mayor Edwards was recalled in a special election the previous day. The council elected its own president, Robert H. Harlin as mayor and Levine was selected to fill his unexpired council term.

He was repeatedly re-elected by the public, serving over three decades on the council, and serving as council president in 1934–35, 1938–39, 1941–42, 1950–54, and 1956-62. Nard Jones describes him as having been "virtually mayor as far as power and action went." His sole electoral defeat came in 1935, when a political insurgency by a young men's group called the New Order of Cincinnatus brought three new members to the council, including Arthur B. Langlie, later governor.

Levine served over 250 times as the city's acting mayor and described himself as "flattered" by suggestions that he run for mayor, but he chose never to do so. On November 2, 1953, with Mayor Allan Pomeroy out of town, Levine as acting mayor signed the ordinances enacting the annexation to the city of the area from N 85th Street to N 145th Street, adding 40,800 people and 89.769 square miles (232.50 km^{2}) to the city.

Levine played an important role in the management of the city's finances, to the point that A. A. Lemieux, president of Seattle University dubbed him the "watchdog of the city treasury". The Seattle Daily Journal of Commerce described him in 1958 as having "specialized in municipal finance" and "credited [him] with saving the taxpayers millions of dollars"; four years later, upon his retirement, they praised his "prudence and thrift" on behalf of the city. At the time he announced his retirement, the Seattle Times said that "more than any other single individual" Levine had been responsible over the years for Seattle's "operation in the 'black'" and added that "His budget-balancing feats are widely recognized by municipal officials across the nation."

Levine was also known as a supporter of public housing including, in particular, the pioneering Yesler Terrace development.

After retiring from the council, he retained until 1968 a small office at city hall and what Jones characterizes as the "mostly honorary" title of "adviser to the mayor". During this era, by his own account, he never gave unsolicited advice, but "[i]f someone in city government asks my opinion on a question I'll give it..." He served on the boards of the Century 21 Exposition (the 1962 Seattle World's Fair), the Seattle Municipal League (the "Muni League"), and on the Seattle Center Advisory Commission, the Metro Council, the Board of Administration, the City Employees' Retirement System, the Firemen's Pension Board, the Police Pension Board, and the city's Board of Investment.
