= Seattle Police Department =

Seattle, United States law enforcement agency

- Patch of the department
- Abbreviation: SPD
- Motto: Service, Pride, Dedication

Agency overview
- Formed: 1869
- Annual budget: $365m (2022)

Jurisdictional structure
- Operations jurisdiction: Washington, U.S.
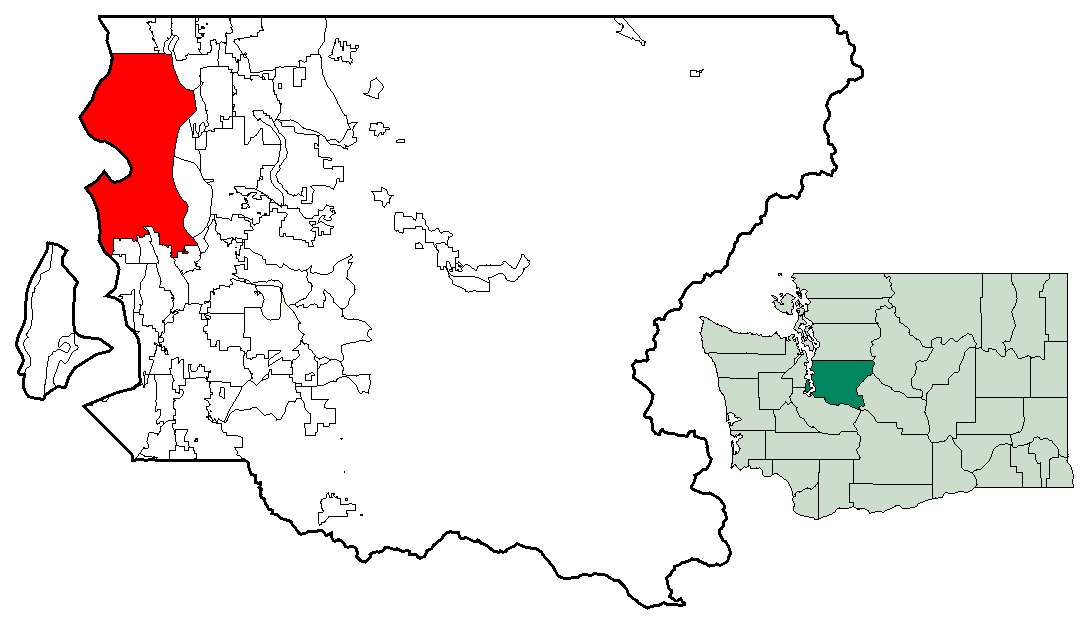
- Seattle Police jurisdiction
- Area: 142.5 square miles (369 km^{2})
- Population: 737,015 (2020)
- Legal jurisdiction: City of Seattle
- General nature: Local civilian police

Operational structure
- Headquarters: Seattle, Washington, U.S.
- Police officers: ▼913 of 1,200 (2024)
- Civilian employees: 631
- Agency executive: Deputy Chief Andre Sayles, Acting Chief of Police (as of July 30, 2026)
- Precincts: 5

Website
- seattle.gov/police

The Seattle Police Department (SPD) is the principal law enforcement agency of the city of Seattle, Washington, United States. It is responsible for the entire city except for the campus of the University of Washington (which is under the university's police department).

Law enforcement in Seattle began with the election of John T. Jordan as town marshal in 1869. The SPD was officially organized on June 2, 1869, predating the incorporation of Seattle by the territorial legislature in December. Today, it has a number of specialty units including SWAT, bike patrol, harbor patrol, motorcycles, and a variety of detective units.

Between 2012 and 2025, the SPD was under federal oversight after a United States Department of Justice investigation found that SPD officers routinely used excessive force.

Patrolmen are represented by the Seattle Police Officers' Guild in labor negotiations.

== Command structure ==
- Chief of Police: (Vacant)
- Deputy Chief: Yvonne Underwood
- Deputy Chief (Administration & Investigations): Andre Sayles (Acting Chief of Police)
- Assistant Chief of Investigations: Nicole Powell
- Assistant Chief of Professional Standard: Lori Aagard
- Assistant Chief of Special Operations: Tyrone Davis
- Executive Director of Administration: CAO Valarie Anderson
- Executive Director of Budget and Finance: Angela Socci
- Executive Director of Crime & Community Harm Reduction: Dr Lee Hunt
- Chief of Staff: Alex Ricketts
- Director of Communications: Barbara DeLollis

== Rank structure and insignia ==
Rank structure and insignia
Title	Insignia
Chief of Police	
Deputy Chief	
Assistant Chief	
Captain	
Lieutenant	
Sergeant Major*	
Sergeant	
Detective	No insignia
Police Officer	No insignia

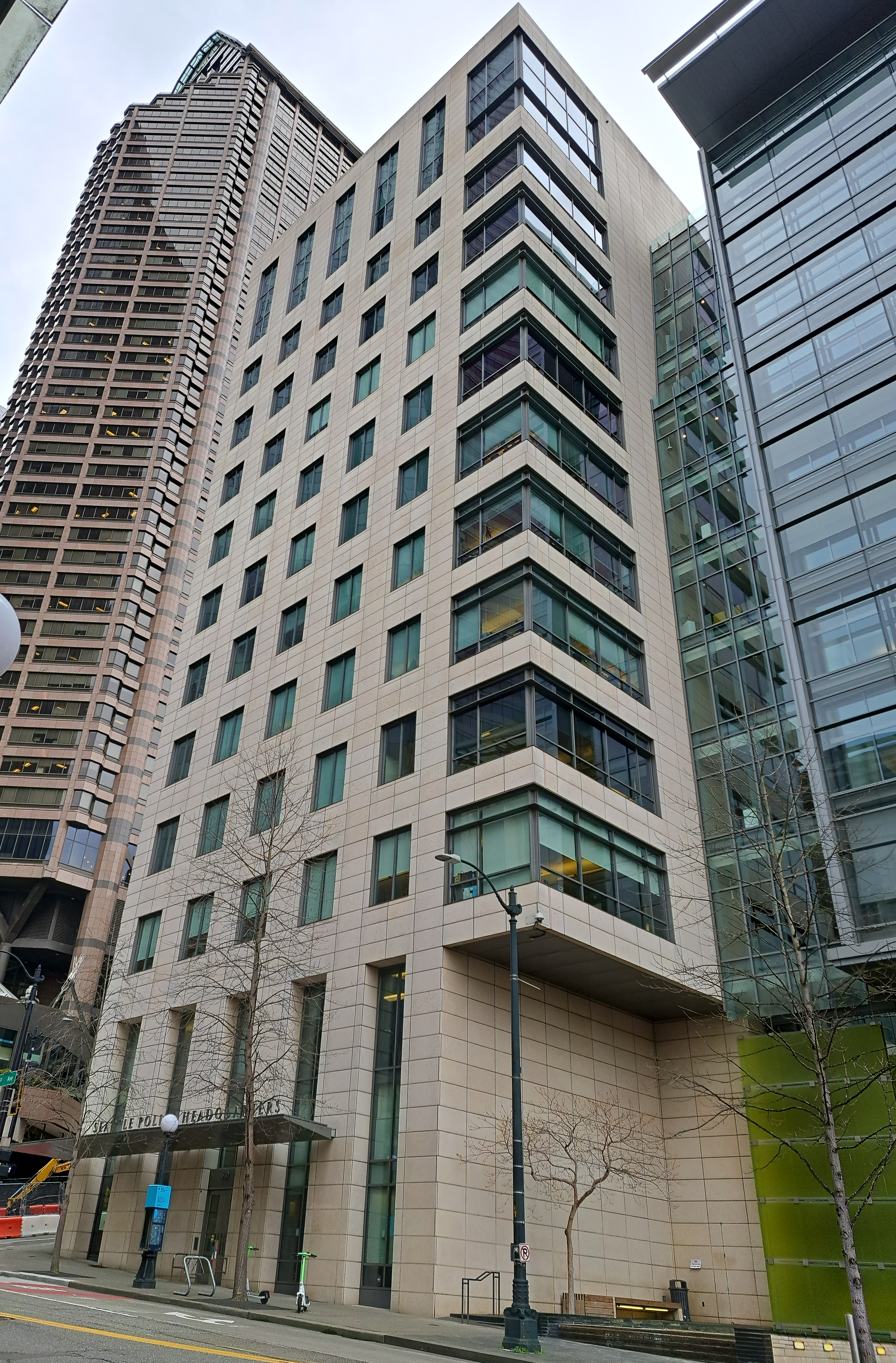
Seattle Police Headquarters

Sergeant Major Arnold "Arny" McGinnis (retired in 2012) is the only known SPD member to hold the rank.*

=== Promotions ===
After three years in patrol, officers can become candidates to transfer to a wide variety of specialty units and are also eligible to attend a weeklong detective school. After five years as a police officer, they can take a promotional examination. Every other year, civil service tests are administered for promotions. Tests are given for the rank of sergeant, lieutenant, and captain. Assistant and deputy chiefs are appointed by the chief from the management ranks. Officers may be promoted to sergeant after five years of experience with the department and passing the sergeant's exam. Lieutenants must have at least three years' experience as sergeants, and captains must have at least three years' experience as lieutenants. A bachelor's degree may substitute for one year of experience but can only be used for one promotional exam.

== History ==
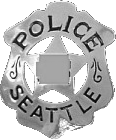
Seattle P.D. badge from the late 1910s

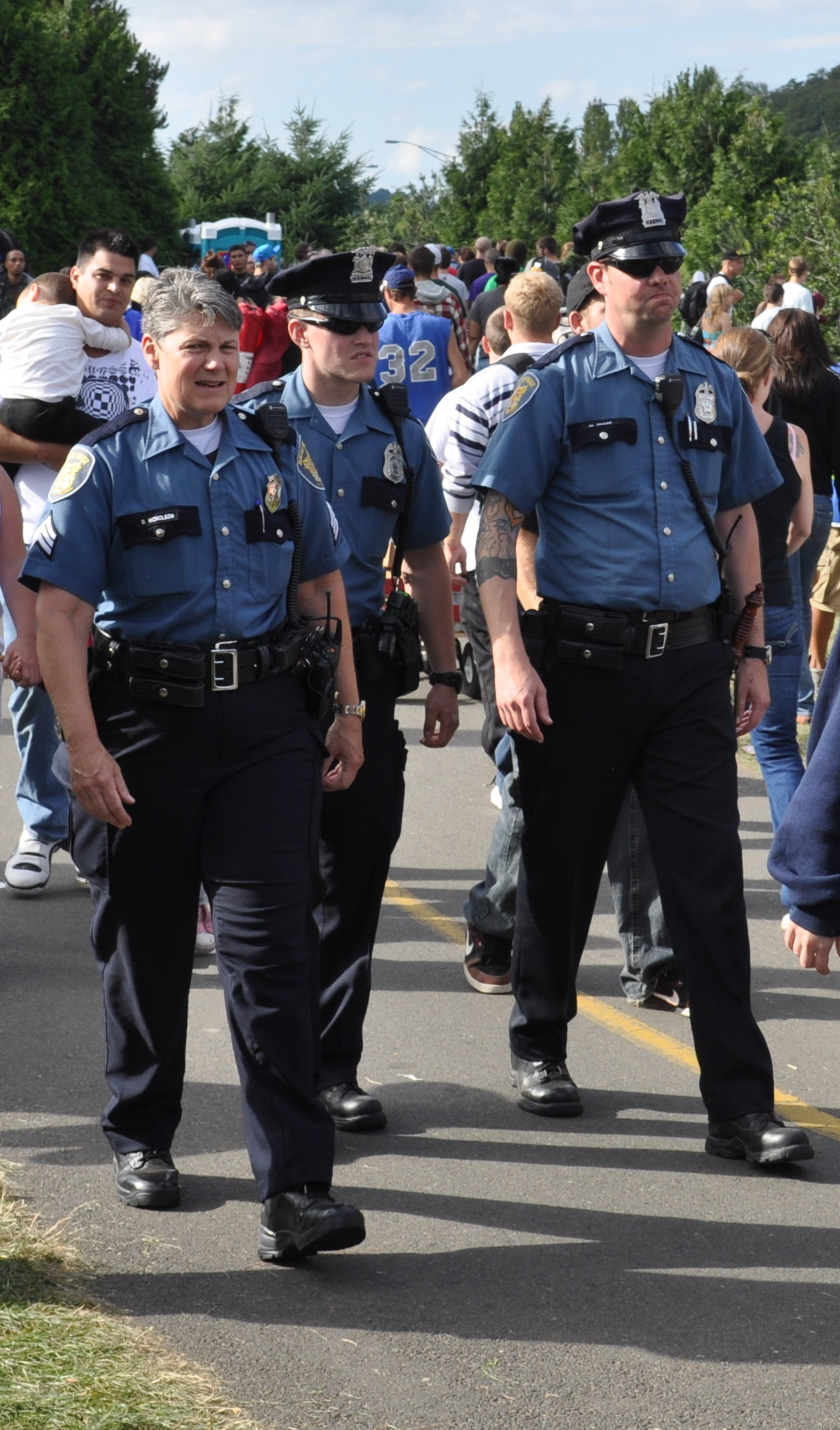
Regular patrolmen in the pre-2015 uniform at Seattle Hempfest

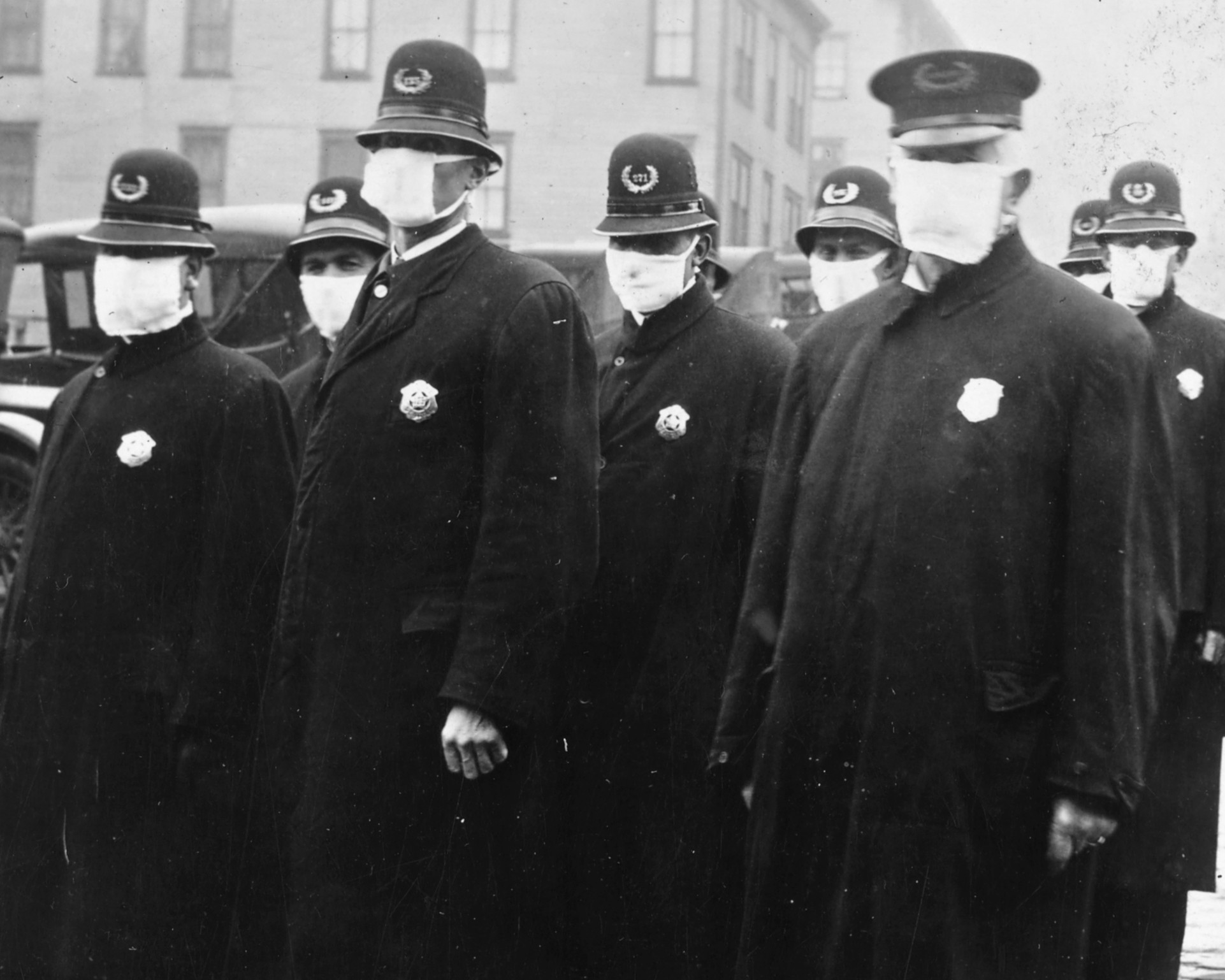
Seattle policemen in 1918 during the Spanish flu pandemic

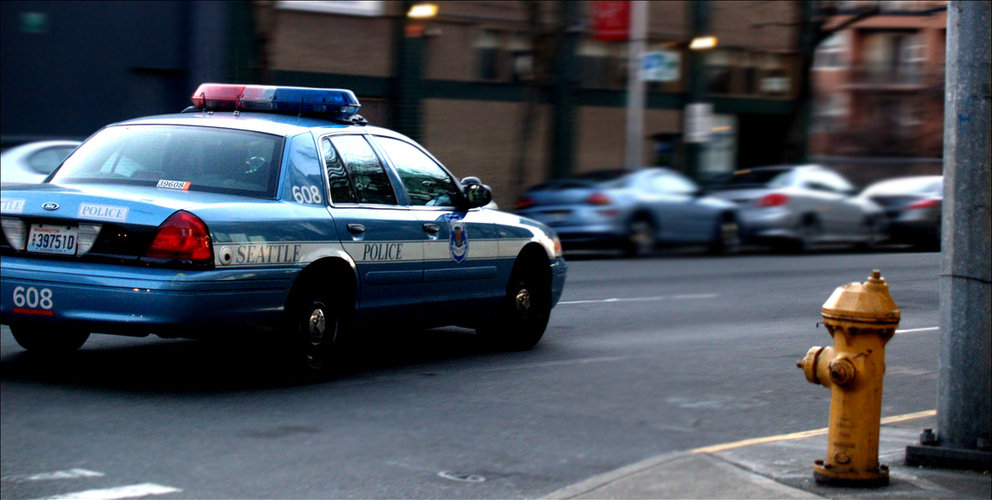
A Seattle Police car on patrol near 2nd Ave downtown.

The Seattle police force was established in 1869 with the election of John T. Jordan as the first town marshal. In 1883, the town marshal position was disestablished and replaced by an appointed position: the chief of police. By 1896, there were 43 police officers and 60,000 residents.

Officer David Sires was the first officer to be killed in the line of duty in 1881. The man accused of killing Sires, along with two other men accused of murder, were lynched by a mob of Seattleites in January, 1882. This event, along with the Anti-Chinese Race Riots of 1886 were associated with significant investment by the city into the police department.

The State of Washington prohibited alcohol in 1916. Police Lieutenant Roy Olmstead began a bootlegging operation while employed by the police department. In March 1920, he was arrested by Federal prohibition agents and was fired from his job with the department. After being fired, he continued to run a very profitable rumrunning business. Relying on bribery of police officers, Olmstead was able to avoid most conflict until his arrest in 1924. He was convicted in 1926 with twenty others in one of the first cases that used telephone wiretaps. Olmstead's case made it to the supreme court, where his conviction was upheld. He was released in 1931 and pardoned by President Franklin D. Roosevelt in 1935.

In June 1924, Bertha Landes served as acting mayor while Edwin J. Brown was out of the city to attend the Democratic National Convention. In a newspaper story, Police Chief William Severyns said that the department had at least a hundred corrupt officers. Mayor Landes ordered the chief to fire one hundred officers. When he refused, Landes fired him. Mayor Brown rushed back to the city to reverse Mayor Landes' actions. Following Landes term as acting mayor, she became the first elected female mayor of Seattle in 1926. Mayor Landes was a strict enforcer of anti-vice law and was critical of the SPD. Quickly thereafter, Chief Severyns described to the Seattle Union Record several cases of police brutality. One report included questioning suspects in a rowboat in Lake Washington with a heavy weight tied around their necks. This was one of the first official accounts of police corruption and brutality in the city.

In July 1935, the city council held hearings on the many gambling and prostitution dens in the city. The police chief claimed he had no knowledge of such activities in the city. Councilman Fred Hamley walked with the chief onto Fourth Avenue to an establishment that featured a roulette wheel and handed him an ax. The chief remained in office.

In 1943, after many cases of soldiers returning to bases from Seattle with sexually transmitted diseases, the federal government threatened to take over policing in the city and enforce laws on prostitution and sex-work. After this, Chief Kimsey began a crackdown on prostitution.

In the autumn of 1947, police Chief George Eastman reassigned the police captain in charge of suppressing illegal alcohol sales after complaints such establishments were running openly. The chief took no steps to otherwise discipline the man.

In 1952, officer Ted Yerabek helped start the Seattle Chinese Community Girls Drill Team as their first instructor. He was a member of Seattle's Police Drill Team which had won multiple awards, and he brought over many of their police drills to the successful girls drill team. The police drill team stopped in the early 1980s but the girls drill team remained active as of 2021.

In November 1969, police Chief Frank Ramon retired after accusations that he had tried to stifle an investigation into gambling and government corruption.

On June 21, 1974, a Seattle Police helicopter on its way to a shooting collided with a Cessna plane near Boeing Field. Both officers on board and both civilians in the plane were killed.

In 1987, the Seattle Police Department created the modern mountain bike patrol units, paving the way for cities across North America to follow.

In 2011, the United States Justice Department found that the department had engaged in a pattern of constitutional violations in its use of force.

In 2012, the rank of "Sergeant Major" was created and bestowed upon then-Sergeant Arnold "Arny" McGinnis. Sergeant Major McGinnis started working at the Seattle Police Department in 1962, holding the rank of police officer. He retired in July 2012 at the age of 75, reaching fifty years of service to the city of Seattle. He is the only member of the SPD known to hold the rank.

On May 19, 2014, Kathleen O'Toole was nominated to serve as Chief of the Seattle Police Department and was officially appointed on June 23, 2014. In 2015, O'Toole and others in the department developed and implemented a data-oriented policing strategy called "Agile Policing Strategy", influenced by agile manufacturing. The approach was developed to increase the responsiveness or agility of the department to address crime and disorder problems through the real-time surfacing, visualization, analysis, and sharing of data across all necessary operational units of the police department. Organizationally, this was accomplished through the SPD's Real Time Crime Center, established in July 2015 using a combination of asset forfeiture funds and a federal government grant, which houses the technology, analytical support and command structure.

=== 2020 George Floyd protests ===
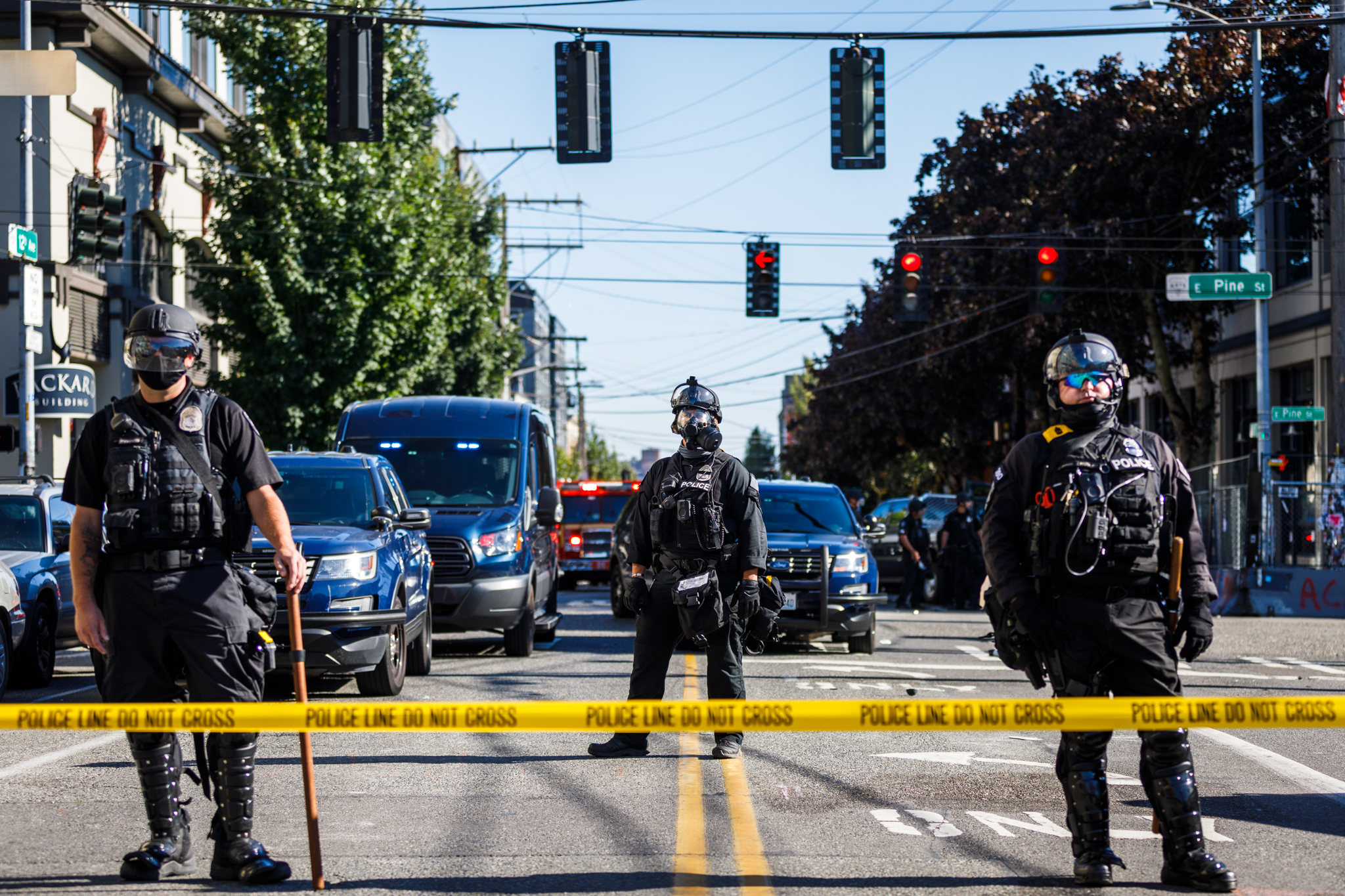
Seattle riot police block a road on Capitol Hill during the George Floyd protests on June 25, 2020

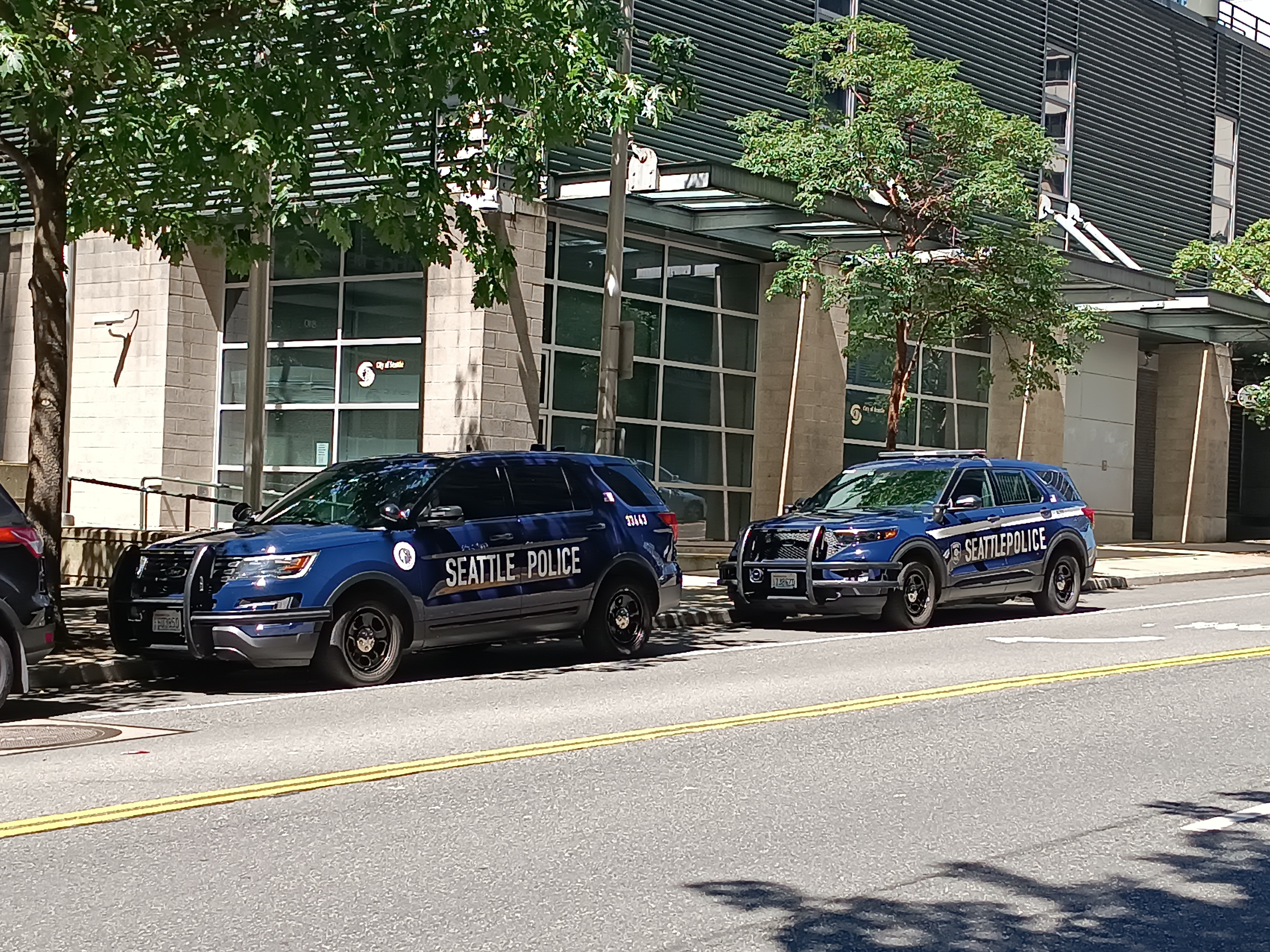
Two units of the Seattle Police Department in 2024

On Sunday May 31, 2020, the department blockaded the streets around the East Precinct which was located at the intersection of 12th Ave E and E Pine. They did this before a protest march approached the precinct. The march moved on after a short while. On Monday June 1 a much larger group of thousands marched from Westlake Plaza to the intersection of 11th Ave E and E Pine where the street was blockaded. This day the march did not move on. After several hours the police ordered the group to disperse. When they did not they tear gassed the protestors. A similar gathering formed the next night. This was also ordered to disperse and tear gassed. On June 3, Mayor Jenny Durkan lifted the curfew that had been in effect since May 30. On June 5, Mayor Durkan banned the use of tear gas for 30 days without the approval of the Police Chief. On Saturday June 6, the police again used pepper spray and non-tear gas explosives to try to disperse demonstrators. Seattle City Council member Kshama Sawant said “The police had come prepared to inflict violence without provocation.” By this time protestors had coalesced around demands of defunding of the police department by at least 50 percent, an expansion of investments in black and brown communities, and releasing all protestors. Nightly protests continued until June 7 when the crowd was again dispersed by flash bangs and tear gas, which the police said was in response to protesters throwing projectiles at officers. On Monday June 8 the police boarded up the precinct and withdrew from the building. Later that night residents declared "Free Capitol Hill".

On June 17, 2020, King County Labor Council delegates voted to expel the Seattle Police Officers Guild from the organization, following a demand pushed by many protesters.

On August 11, 2020, it was announced that Police Chief Carmen Best would retire, effective September 2, 2020. Deputy Chief Adrian Z. Diaz succeeded Best in an interim capacity and was appointed to the permanent position on September 20, 2022.

In January 2024, the City settled a lawsuit brought by 50 protesters who were injured during the protests for $10 million.

On May 30, 2024, former King County Sheriff Sue Rahr was appointed Interim Police Chief by Mayor Bruce Harrell. Rahr was appointed to replace Chief Adrian Diaz, who was removed and reassigned to other special assignments within the SPD. Diaz was removed after he was named by at least six SPD officers in lawsuits against the department alleging discrimination. Rahr will only spend a few months in the role and is not interested in holding the position regularly. Instead, she will collaborate with former SPD Chief Kathleen O’Toole to compile a list of qualified semi-finalist candidates for public review. Diaz was fired in December 2024.

== Controversies and misconduct ==
=== Before 2000 ===
In June 1901, Police Chief William L. Meredith was forced to resign by a Seattle City Council investigation that found he had taken bribes and allowed illegal gambling operations to flourish. Meredith then ambushed one of his accusers in a local drugstore with a shotgun and pistol. It went badly for him and he was killed by John Considine, his intended victim.

In 1911, Police Chief Charles W. Wappenstein was ousted by a reform-minded mayor. He was convicted on state charges related to bribery, prostitution, and other vices. In December 1913, Governor Ernest Lister granted him a pardon. He died in 1931.

In January 1967, the Seattle Times ran a series of stories revealing a long-standing and widespread culture of corruption in the police department. Gambling dens, illegal bars and gay clubs were forced to pay protection to the local patrolman who kept half and passed to his sergeant who in turn kept half and passed the remainder along.

Former homicide detective, Earl “Sonny” Davis, was accused of stealing at least $11,400 on Oct. 1, 1996, from the belongings of an elderly man, Bodegard Mitchell, who was fatally shot by police during a standoff at a South Seattle apartment. Davis' ex-partner, Cloyd Steiger, testified he saw Davis pocket a bundle of cash - which Steiger initially believed to be about $100 - while the two were searching the apartment for evidence. Steiger further testified Davis asked him if he had a problem with taking money, referred to it as a "squad thing".

In 1999, Seattle hosted the World Trade Organization Ministerial Conference. The Seattle Police Department was criticized for failing to properly prepare for protest activity involving over 100,000 protesters that disrupted the conference. While the majority of protestors were not violent, some assaulted delegates and police, and destroyed property. The protest soon devolved into a riot. In response, SPD used chemical agents and less-lethal weapons in an attempt to restore order. News footage of this response and of the rioting was broadcast worldwide. No protesters or police officers were injured seriously enough during the riot to require hospitalization. Chief Norm Stamper resigned amid the scrutiny of police response to the event.

=== 2000s ===
In 2001, riots broke out downtown during the Mardi Gras celebrations. The riots resulted in one death, more than 70 hospitalizations, and 21 arrests.

In July of the same year, Officer Jess Pitts stopped a group of 14 Asian-American students and instructors for jaywalking in the International District. The students alleged that Pitts lined them up against a wall and detained them for around 45 minutes while repeatedly asking if they spoke English. An instructor Andrew Cho claimed that another officer on the scene Officer Larry Brotherton said to him "I've been to your country before, when I was in the Army", incorrectly assuming Cho was Vietnamese. Only one student was issued a citation, which was later dismissed. The student's attorney noted that because she said to Pitts "You wouldn't have stopped us if we had blond hair" and was the only one issued a citation, this showed that the ticket was issued in response to her antagonizing the officer, rather than for jaywalking. The Office of Police Accountability (OPA) later sustained a single allegation of unprofessionalism against Pitts.

The Seattle Police Officers' Guild membership later overwhelmingly passed a vote of no confidence in Chief Gil Kerlikowske, citing a double standard where Officer Pitts, a beat officer, was publicly criticized for the jaywalking incident but upper-level personnel were not held responsible for failures in handling the Mardi Gras riots.

Former detective Dale Nixdorf resigned after an OPA investigation sustained a complaint claiming that he sexually harassed and assaulted a woman who sought help after a domestic violence incident in 2003. According to a lawsuit filed in 2006, Nixdorf was assigned to drive her home and install one of the department's temporary alarm systems after the incident. Over the next couple weeks, Nixdorf allegedly called and visited her home repeatedly, claiming to be checking on the security system while making sexually aggressive comments and asking for sex each time. The lawsuit also claimed that Nixdorf grabbed her buttocks and forced her to fondle him over his jeans.

On May 22, 2009, SPD officer and hostage negotiator Eugene Schubeck shot Nathaniel Caylor in the face. Police were responding to a report that Caylor was suicidal and had locked himself in his apartment with his son. Caylor was speaking to Schubeck from his patio, and was shot when he attempted to re-enter his apartment. In June 2015, the resulting use-of-force lawsuit was settled for $1.975 million, the largest such settlement in the city's history.

=== 2010s ===
In August 2010, SPD officer Ian Birk shot and killed Native American woodcarver John T. Williams. Subsequent grand jury findings on the level of threat posed by Williams were inconclusive but an internal review of the shooting by the SPD's Firearms Review Commission found the shooting "unjustified" and cited Birk's tactical mishandling of the confrontation as being responsible for Williams' death. Birk resigned from the department, though prosecutor Dan Satterberg declined to file charges, prompting a protest by Williams' family and supporters.

In 2010, detectives from SPD's Gang Unit ordered two Latino men suspected of committing a crime to lie on the ground, where they were kicked and verbally assaulted; the incident was captured on a bystander's cellphone video. The police let the men go soon afterwards; the video prompted protests over racial tensions and a police department internal investigation. Several officers were suspended without pay and/or demoted, but not criminally charged. A civil lawsuit by one of the two men was settled later in 2012 for $100,000.

In December 2011, the SPD was subject to a U.S. Department of Justice investigation that found officers had violated the 14th Amendment and the Violent Crime Control and Law Enforcement Act of 1994. The DOJ found that SPD officers engaged in a pattern of excessive use of force that violated the Constitution as well as Federal law. Furthermore, the regular invocation of the Garrity v. New Jersey protection was found to have reduced the department's ability to supervise the use of force and hinder investigations. A spokesman for the SPD indicated they will fully comply with the DOJ inquiry to avoid a federal lawsuit. In late July 2012, the city and Department of Justice reached a settlement that included improved oversight, training and reporting.

On 6 October 2012, Officer Eric Faust beat a man he was attempting to detain. In September 2013, as a result of an internal investigation, the department suspended Faust for eight days without pay.

On 13 July 2013, the department fired Lieutenant Donnie Lowe due to misconduct characterized as domestic violence and dishonesty.

On 30 July 2013, Officer John Marion, threatened a reporter who was observing a number of policemen making an arrest. An internal investigation of Marion's behavior confirmed his actions. He was given a single day of unpaid suspension.

In August 2013, the city agreed to pay two brothers $38,500 for a case of abuse. The two men claimed they were targeted by Officer Michael Waters because he was upset at how they had treated him at a local bar. According to the claim, Waters and his partner used the pretext of looking for two bank robbers to humiliate and assault the two men. Although the city agreed to settle the matter, neither officer was punished and they continue on the force.

In January 2014, Detective David Blackmer plead guilty to stalking his mistress after she threatened to reveal their relationship to his wife. He was sentenced to 90 days in jail. An internal police investigation was then launched to determine whether he should be fired.

In July 2014, Officer Cynthia Whitlatch arrested William Wingate, a black pedestrian who had a golf club that he was using as a cane. She falsely claimed that Wingate had swung his cane at her and he was charged with obstruction and harassment and spent a night in jail. When video showed he had done nothing to provoke the officer, the police department apologized in January 2015. Whitlatch was later fired by Chief O'Toole.

In March 2015, Officer Peter Leutz was fired after an investigation found that he sent three women he met on duty over 100 text messages in pursuit of romantic relationships. In a written letter to Leutz, Police Chief Kathleen O'Toole wrote that he engaged in "serious and repeated abuse of authority, and an unsettling pattern of behavior, some of it directed at women who [he] knew from the outset, or learned early on, may have been especially vulnerable given turmoil in their personal lives."

In November 2016, Officer Adley Shepherd was fired after he punched a drunk, handcuffed woman who kicked him while he was putting her into the back of his police car. An arbitrator on the Disciplinary Review Board later attempted to reduce the firing to a 15-day suspension, but was overruled by a King County Superior Court judge. The case was again appealed to the Court of Appeals which upheld the previous ruling, writing that the arbitrator's decision to overturn Shepherd's firing "sends a message to officers that a violation of a clear and specific policy is not that serious if the officer is dealing with a difficult subject, losing patience, or passionate in believing that he or she did nothing wrong — however mistaken that belief may be."

In March 2017, a duffel bag in the South Precinct was found containing a handgun reported stolen in 1990.

In May 2018, Officer Matthew Kerby drove to a West Seattle house in search of a man who allegedly drove away from a minor collision. When he found that the man was not home, he falsely told a woman at the home that the man had been involved in a hit-and-run in which a woman involved might not survive. This led to a chain of events which culminated in the man's suicide in June of that year. Kerby was later suspended for six days without pay.

In July 2018, officers Kenneth Martin and Tabitha Sexton were fired after an October 2017 incident in which they shot 27 rounds into a fleeing car in Eastlake.

In October 2018, Sergeant Frank Poblocki was demoted to officer after he sat for 40 minutes outside the workplace of a man who cursed him and called him names. Witnesses say he referred to this behavior as community policing.

In February 2019, the city agreed to pay Alonzo Price-Holt $100,001, as well as $58,989 in attorney fees, to settle a federal lawsuit that alleged excessive use of force by Officer Zsolt Dornay. Footage from the holding cell shows Officer Dornay tackling Price-Holt, who had his hands handcuffed behind his back. Dornay was also given 30 days of unpaid leave as a result of the incident. Dornay had previously been convicted of drunk driving.

=== 2020s ===
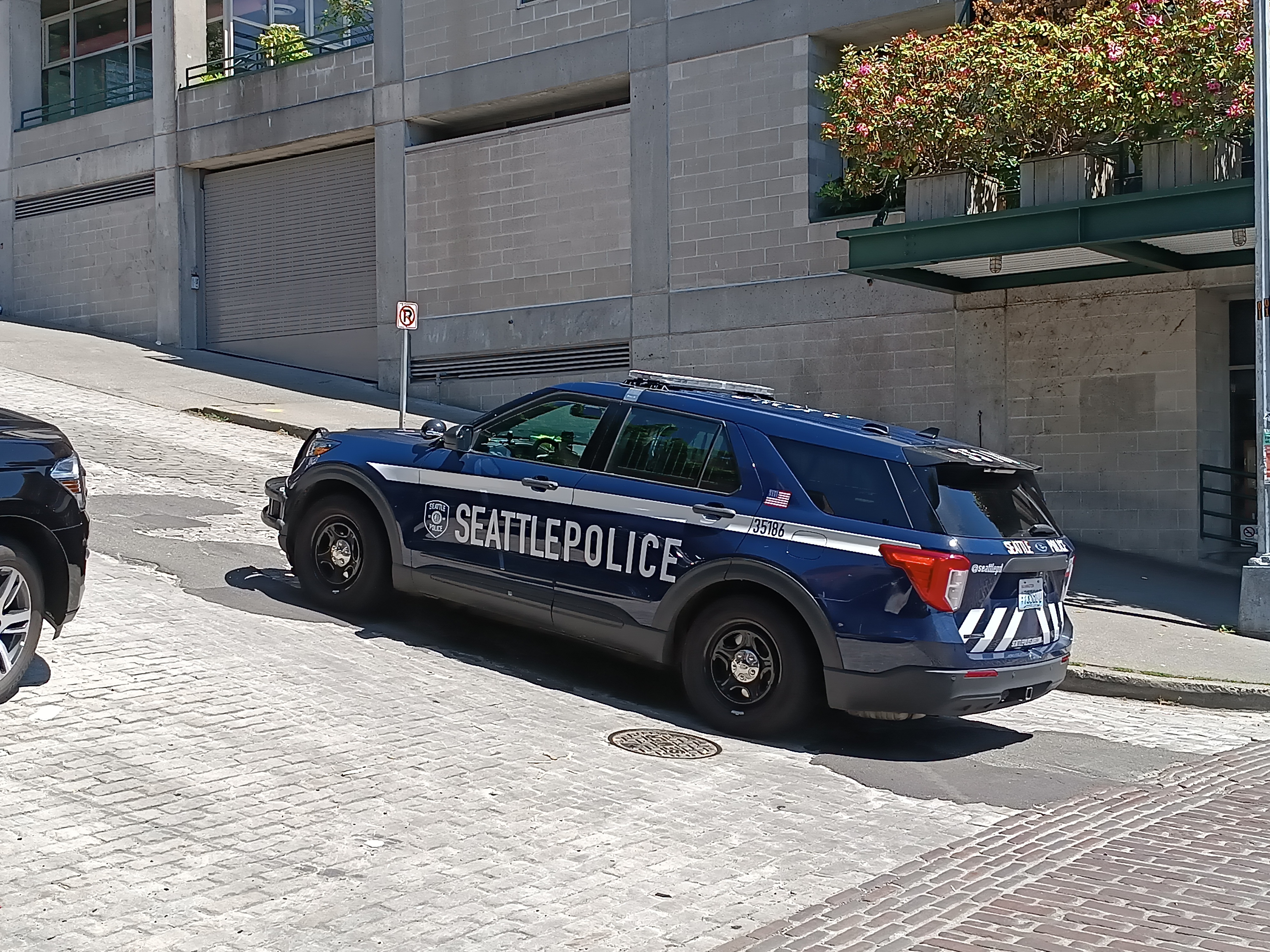
Ford Police Interceptor Utility of the Seattle Police Department

In January 2020, Officer Duane Goodman was fired for his Instagram posts, which a report by the Office of Police Accountability described as using "extreme profane language" and posts that ranted against "illegal immigration" and "appeared to endorse violence" against Hillary Clinton and Barack Obama. The department contacted the U.S. Secret Service, who interviewed Goodman, after he captioned an image of a package bomb with the message, "I don't condone sending package bombs but god it would be nice for Killary and Anti-cop Obama to finally STFU! Maybe Obama will stop lying and claiming the good economy is from him."

In February 2020, Officer Todd Novisedlak was fired after an investigation by the OPA which cited his physically abusing his ex-girlfriend, his marijuana use, and his repeatedly making discriminatory and derogatory remarks against others based on race, sexual orientation, and gender. This follows a 2015 court case, settled by the city, in which a man was jailed for a week after a kidnapping victim "positively identified" a license photograph, shown to her by Novisedlak, of a man with the same name as one of the suspects.

In the same month, it was reported that Lieutenant Sina Ebinger, who led the city's Navigation Team, used the city contractor which clears encampments to remove personal garbage from her home. An investigation by the Office of Police Accountability found that in addition to using city resources for personal benefit, she told investigators several different versions of her story and deleted her entire text and browsing history and phone log. After the OPA findings were released, she retired from the department in lieu of termination.

In May 2020, during the George Floyd protests in Washington state, while Seattle police were attempting to detain looters, a white suspect was restrained with an officer's knee on his neck for 13 seconds while bystanders urged the officer to stop. This continued until a second officer intervened to push the first officer's knee to the suspect's back. This was documented on video. George Floyd himself had died after being restrained with a knee on his neck during an arrest. According to The Huffington Post, further video footage showed that the same Seattle officer had just used his knee on the neck of another white looting suspect.

In June 2020, a Federal Judge in Seattle ordered local police to stop using tear gas, pepper spray, stun grenade, "rubber bullets", and other force against non-violent protestors, finding that the Seattle Police had used excessive force against demonstrators, violating their right to free speech.

An investigation by the South Seattle Emerald in July 2020 found that at least eight SPD officers violated department policy and possibly election law by registering to vote at their precinct address, as opposed to their residential address. After the OPA investigation concluded, five officers (including the Seattle Police Officers Guild president Mike Solan) received written reprimands or 1 day suspensions.

Police union president Mike Solan faced calls for him to resign after falsely claiming that the January 6 United States Capitol attack was at least partially the fault of Black Lives Matter and other left-wing activists in early January 2021. At least two SPD officers who attended the riot or the preceding rally were placed on administrative leave, and six SPD officers were present for at least part of the preceding rally. SPD officers Alexander Everett and Caitlin Rochelle, a married couple, were later fired after an OPA investigation found that they trespassed onto Capitol grounds during the attack.

In September 2021, the city of Seattle settled a lawsuit for $250,000 after officers entered the home of a 74-year-old man during a 2019 welfare check, held him at gunpoint, and forcefully arrested him. A previous OPA investigation into the incident had concluded that allegations of excessive force were unfounded and consistent with department policy.

An OPA investigation released in January 2022 revealed that during the George Floyd protests in June 2020, SPD officers faked radio chatter about armed Proud Boys heading toward the area that would later be known as the Capitol Hill Occupied Protest (CHOP). According to OPA Director Myerberg, this "improperly added fuel to the fire and could have had dire results." The investigation did not sustain allegations against any officers identified in the radio transmissions but instead against two supervisors who had already left the department. This revelation followed several other instances of misinformation from the department during the 2020 protests, such as claims of extortion in the CHOP area and a SPD tweet claiming pictured candles were improvised explosives thrown by protesters at police.

In April 2022, the Seattle Office of the Inspector General (OIG) released a report that found that the OPA routinely dismissed complaints against officers who violated the mask mandate by calling it a systemic issue to be addressed by the department rather than a matter for individual discipline. None of the 98 mask-related allegations reviewed by the OIG were sustained by OPA, even as officers repeatedly violated the mandate. The report also noted that the department was previously fined $5,400 in February 2021 by the Washington Department of Labor and Industries for mask violations but was forced to drop the case after officers used tactics to prolong OPA investigations into the allegations.

In October 2021, Twitter user @WhiteRoseAFA posted a thread that linked an anonymous Twitter account to Officer Andrei Constantin and listed screenshots of several offensive tweets from the account including posts that celebrated violence against protesters, taunted a grieving mother, and stated George Floyd "got justice". Constantin was fired from the department in September 2022 after the ensuing OPA investigation concluded. In the disciplinary action report explaining the termination, Police Chief Adrian Diaz also pointed to Constantin's history of disciplinary issues, including two suspensions, as contributing to the determination.

An OPA investigation issued in August 2022 alleged that an SPD commander brought window blinds, a sleeping cot, and a mattress to the office and would regularly sleep in his office while on duty. He resigned from the department before he could be disciplined and declined to be interviewed for the investigation.

In January 2023, Officer Kevin Dave, responding to an overdose call, struck and killed 23-year-old student Jaahnavi Kandula as she was crossing Dexter Avenue in a marked crosswalk on Thomas Street. The department did not confirm that Kandula had died until 18 hours after the collision and declined to provide information about the involved officer or the speed at which he was driving. A department spokeswoman stated that the officer would not be reporting to his next shift but would instead take a "release day" following a "traumatic or upsetting" event. Documents obtained by local outlet Publicola later revealed that the officer was driving 74 MPH in an area with a 25 MPH speed limit immediately before the collision. In September 2023, SPD released body camera footage showing Seattle Police Officer Daniel Auderer discussing Kandula's death one day after she died; he stated: "she's dead", laughs, then says: "it's a regular person ... just write a check, $11,000, she was 26 anyway, she had limited value." Auderer, who is also the Vice President of the Seattle Police Officers' Guild, made the comments while talking on a call to Mike Solan, President of the Seattle Police Officers' Guild. Later in September 2023, the department had Auderer "administratively reassigned to a non-operational position". He was later fired, according to an internal email sent to the department.

In July 2023, a lawsuit related to the 2020 George Floyd protests surfaced video captured on police body-worn camera in SPD's East Precinct showing a "Trump 2020" flag prominently displayed in a precinct break room, along with a mock tombstone marking the death of Damarius Butts, a 19-year-old Black man killed by the department in 2017. The department speculated that the tombstone was taken from protests commemorating victims of police brutality and placed on a shelf for storage.

In September 2023, The Stranger published an audio recording of Officer Burton Hill using racist slurs and sexist language at his elderly Chinese-American neighbor. He was later placed on administrative leave after the police chief listened to the audio recording.

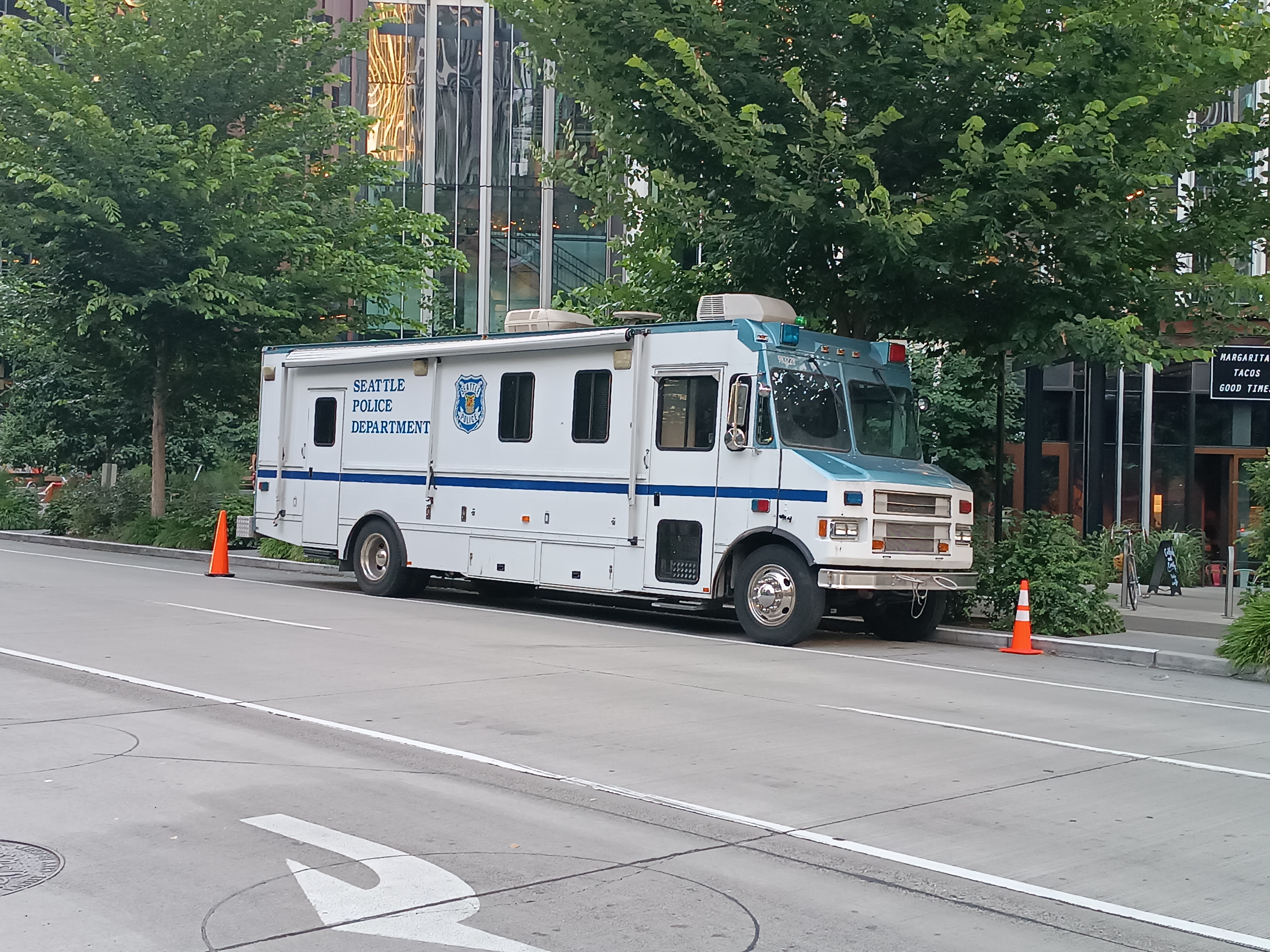
Seattle command vehicle of the police department

In November 2023, a lawsuit filed against the city of Seattle alleged that Seattle police officers broke down a woman's door and entered with guns drawn while responding to a crisis call for a different building.

In May 2024, a video uploaded to Instagram showed two officers repeatedly beating a man on his stomach with batons, with force described by the person who took the video as excessive.

== Sidearm ==
A majority of SPD officers carry semi-automatic pistols of various make and caliber. The SPD authorizes numerous pistols for carry, including ones made by Glock, Smith & Wesson, Springfield Armory, Inc., Heckler & Koch, Walther, Beretta, SIG-Sauer and Ruger. The most common sidearm chosen by officers of the SPD are various Glock models, such as the Glock Model 17 in 9mm, Model 22 in .40 S&W, and the Model 21 in .45 ACP. The compact Glock Model 19 in 9 mm and Model 23 in .40 are also used by officers.

However, while the majority of officers carry semi automatics, double-action revolvers produced by Smith & Wesson, Ruger, Colt and Taurus are also authorized for carry, in .38 Special, .357 Magnum and .45 ACP.

AR-15s and shotguns are also issued to patrol officers after additional required qualification(s). Specialty units including SWAT utilize select fire suppressed rifles (typically an AR variant), HK MP5 SMG's, shotguns and sniper weapon systems.

== Bike Unit ==
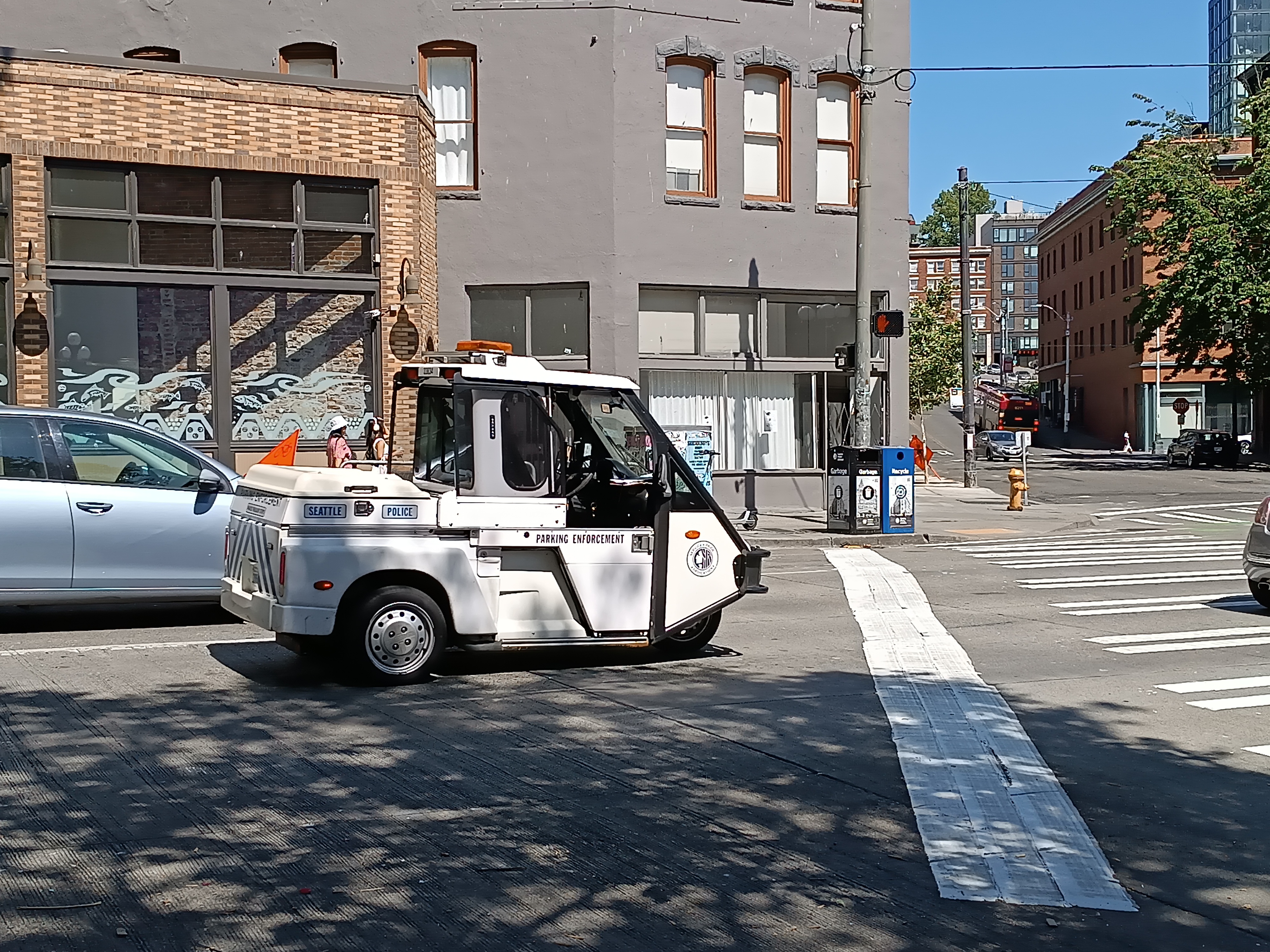
Westward working of the parking enforcement

The SPD's Bike Unit was the first mountain bike unit in the United States.

In 2005, the department started testing the use of BlackBerry PDAs with bike patrol officers. These PDAs allowed officers on the streets access to police records when the use of regular mobile data computer is not available.

== Seattle Metropolitan Police Museum ==
The Seattle Metropolitan Police Museum was a museum in the city's Pioneer Square neighborhood. Founded in 1997, it was dedicated to the history of the Seattle Police Department and of law enforcement in the Seattle metropolitan area. It claimed to be the largest police museum in the western United States until its closure in 2017 due to safety concerns because of the ongoing waterfront tunnel project.

== List of chiefs ==
The 1869 City Charter created the position of marshal to act as the primary law enforcement officer of the city. The position was an elected one, with terms lasting a single year.

City Marshals (1869–1883)
Name	Tenure	Notes
John T. Jordan	1869	First town marshal went on to become mayor in 1871.
Louis V. Wyckoff	1870–1872	
F. A. Minick	1873	
D. H. Webster	1874	
L. V. Wyckoff	1875	
R. H. Turnbull	1876	
E. A. Thorndyke	1877	
F. A. Minick	1878	
E. A. Thorndyke	1879	
J. H. McGraw	1880–1881	Resigned in 1881 to become King County sheriff
J. H. Woolery	1882–1883	

In 1883, an amendment to the city charter disestablished the position of marshal and established the new elected position of chief of police. The Freeholders City Charter of 1890 established a five-member Board of Police Commissioners that oversaw the police department's operations. Under this charter position of chief of police no longer was elected, but rather was appointed by the commission. The commission was chaired by the mayor. The Freeholders City Charter of 1896 disestablished the Board of Police Commissioners and granted the Mayor authority to appoint and to remove chiefs of police. An amendment in 1936 stipulated that chiefs were to be appointed for five year terms. However, the superseding new Freeholders City Charter adopted on March 12, 1946 did not specify a term length.

Chiefs of Police (1884–present)
Name	Tenure	Notes
J.H. Woolery	1884–1886	Was dismissed by the mayor in June 1885, but was quickly returned to office after being reelected on July 27
William M. Murphy	1886–1887	
J.C. Mitchell	1888–1889	Removed from office on April 12, 1889
O. D. Butterfield	1889	
George C. Monroe	1890	
Bolton Rodgers	1891–1892	First chief to be appointed under the 1890 charter
Andrew Jackson	1893	Resigned
D. F. Willard	1893–1894	
Bolton Rodgers	1895–1896	
C.S. Reed	1787–1900	First chief to be appointed under the 1896 charter
William L. Meredith	1901	In June, Meredith was forced by city council to resign due to corruption accusations, later killed attempting to assassinate one of his accusers.
John Sullivan	1901–1903	
Thomas R. Delaney	1904–1905	
Charles W. Wappenstein	1906–1907	
Irving Ward	1908–1909	
Charles W. Wappenstein	1910	
C. G. Bannick	1911–1913	
Austin E. Griffiths	1914	
Louis E. Lang	1915–1916	
C. F. Beckingham	1916–1917	
J. F. Warren	1918–1919	
W. H. Searing	June 1910 – 1922	
W. B. Severns	June 1922–June 1926	Suspended for one week: on June 23, 1924, acting with the powers of an acting mayor during the absence from the city of Mayor Edwin Brown, Bertha Landes took control of the Police Department and removed Severyns, naming Captain Bannick to serve as acting chief. However, seven days later Mayor Edwin Brown returned to the city and immediately reinstated Severns as chief
W. H. Searing	June 1926–June 1928	
Louis J. Forbes	June 1928–June 1931	
William B. Kent	July 1931–May 1932	Appointed by Robert H. Harlin after he took office following the successful recall of Frank E. Edwards. Kent resigned after holding office for less than one year.
G. H. Comstock (acting chief)	May 1931–June 1932	Appointed acting chief by Mayor Robert H. Harlin
L. L. Norton	June 1932–June 1934	
George F. Howard	June 1934–July 1934	Resigned amid disagreement with Mayor Charles L. Smith regarding the response to the 1934 West Coast waterfront strike
George H. Comstock	July 1934–December 1934	Dismissed by Mayor Charles L. Smith after resisting the mayor's order to force the retirement of older officers
Charles L. Smith (mayor of Seattle, acting as department head)	December 1934–January 1935	Mayor Smith took control of the Police Department himself. Walter B. Kirtley served as the department's inspector for this period of time
Walter B. Kirtley	January 1935–April 1936	Served as acting chief from January 17, 1935 until being permanently appointed on February 20.
William H. Sears	April 1936–June 1941	First police chief appointed under the 1936 charter. Was nominated to serve a second term, but the council rejected his nomination 5–4 on June 12, 1941.
Walter B. Kirtley (acting chief)	June 1941	Kirtley was for permanent chief by Mayor Earl Millikin and became acting chief pending confirmation. However, when Millikin was absent from the city, Councilman Levine, using the powers of acting mayor, withdrew the appointment before it could be confirmed and nominated Harlan Callahan, making Callahan acting chief. When he returned to the city, Millikin withdrew Callahan's nomination and nominated Herbert D. Kimsey, who was confirmed unanimously by the City Council
Harlan S. Callahan	July 1941	Kirtley was for permanent chief by Mayor Earl Millikin and became acting chief pending confirmation. However, when Millikin was absent from the city, Councilman Levine, using the powers of acting mayor, withdrew the appointment before it could be confirmed and nominated Harlan Callahan, making Callahan acting chief. When he returned to the city, Millikin withdrew Callahan's nomination and nominated Herbert D. Kimsey, who was confirmed unanimously by the City Council
Herbert D. Kimsey	July 1941–April 1946	
George D. Eastman	August 1946–April 1952	First chief appointed under the 1946 charter amendment
Frank Ramon (acting chief)	April 1952–September 25, 1952	Resigned
H. James Lawrence	September 1952–January 1961	From September 1952 until February 1953, served as acting chief. Was confirmed to serve as permanent chief thereafter.
Frank Ramon	January 1961–November 1969	Retired
W F. Moore (acting chief)	November 1969–July 1970	
C. R. Gain	July 1970–August 1970	
Edward Toothman (interim chief)	August 1970–September 1970	
George Teich	September 1970–March 15, 1974	Resigned
Robert Hanson	March 1974–March 29, 1978	Served as interim chief prior to permanent appointment. Resigned
H. A. Vanden Wyer	March 1978–February 1979	
Patrick Fitzsimmons	February 1979–February 1994	Retired.
Norman Stamper	February 1994–February 2000	Resigned of own accord after criticism of WTO protest response.
Herb Johnson (acting chief)	February 2000–July 2000	
Gil Kerlikowske	July 2000–March 2009	Resigned to assume office as director of the Office of National Drug Control Policy.
John Diaz	May 2009–April 2013	Was serving as interim chief from May 2009 until his confirmation as permanent chief in August 2010. Retired in 2013.
Jim Pugel (acting chief)	2013–2014	
Harry Bailey (acting chief)	Jan 2014–Jun 2014	
Kathleen O'Toole	June 2014–December 2017	Resigned of own accord.
Carmen Best	2018–2020	Served as interim chief from January 2018 until her permanent appointment in August 2018. Resigned of own accord following concerns over proposed reductions to the Seattle Police Department's budget and staffing.
Adrian Z. Diaz	2020–2024	Served as interim chief from September 2020 until being appointed permanent chief in September 2022. Removed as chief in May 2024 and fired later that year.
Sue Rahr	2024–2025	Served as interim chief.
Shon Barnes	2025–2026	Resigned at request of the mayor, following criticism related to the 2026 Seattle Center shooting.
Andre Sayles	2026-	Interim Chief.

== See also ==
- List of law enforcement agencies in Washington (state)
- List of terrorist incidents in Seattle
- List of United States state and local law enforcement agencies
- Murder of Timothy Brenton
