= Order of Cincinnatus =

Order of Cincinnatus may refer to:

- Society of the Cincinnati, an organization in the United States and France founded in 1783
- New Order of Cincinnatus, a political organization in the 1930s
