= Noreen Skagen =

American law enforcement officer

- Born: Noreen Teresa Salvino; May 24, 1930; Seattle, Washington, US
- Died: August 25, 2017 (aged 87); Mill Creek, Washington
- Education: University of Washington (BA)
- Employer: Seattle Police Department
- Children: 2

Noreen T. Skagen (May 24, 1930 – August 25, 2017) was an American law enforcement officer and pioneer for women in policing. Over a three-decade career with the Seattle Police Department (SPD), she became its first female assistant chief of police. In 1989, she was appointed U.S. Marshal for the Western District of Washington, the first woman in that role for the district.

== Early life and education ==
Noreen Teresa Salvino was born and raised in Seattle, Washington in an Italian-American family. She graduated with a degree in journalism from the University of Washington in 1952.

== Career ==
=== Seattle Police Department ===
Skagen joined the SPD in 1959, initially assigned to the Women’s Bureau, which focused on juvenile, domestic, and social welfare cases and excluded women from patrol and promotion. She and her colleagues frequently worked alone in challenging conditions, investigating child neglect and abuse cases in impoverished neighborhoods. These cases were often grim—Skagen recalled rescuing children in severe distress and working under circumstances where societal awareness of child abuse was limited. “A lot of people accused us of doing social work,” she said, “but we made a lot of arrests.”

In 1973, SPD opened promotional exams to women. Skagen scored in the top 25 percent and advanced steadily through the ranks—from sergeant to lieutenant, then captain, major, and finally assistant chief in 1981. She emphasized fairness and approachability, personally visiting every district under her command and inviting open communication. Early skepticism from male officers gave way to respect after she demonstrated integrity and competence.

Although a strong advocate for women in policing, Skagen expressed skepticism toward affirmative action initiatives during her tenure, particularly when first introduced. She maintained that her promotions, and those of her female colleagues, had been earned without preferential policies and believed that such measures risked undermining women's perceived legitimacy. “We didn’t want to be a part of affirmative action,” she said, adding that they trusted the department to promote fairly. Nonetheless, she actively mentored women throughout her career and encouraged them to succeed without compromising their individuality. “You don’t have to walk like a man and talk like a man... You don’t have to change your values in order to belong here,” she advised.

=== U.S. Marshal Service ===
In 1989, Skagen was appointed by President Ronald Reagan as U.S. Marshal for the Western District of Washington. She served until 1994.

=== Later career ===
At age 70, she came out of retirement to serve as interim police chief in Mill Creek, Washington in 2000. She also chaired the Seattle Public Safety Civil Service Commission.

== Personal life ==
Skagen had two sons, Clark and Scott Kimerer, and later married Roy Skagen, himself an SPD assistant chief. She was deeply involved in civic life, serving on the boards of Childhaven, Kid’s Place, and the Boy Scouts of America. In her personal time, she enjoyed gardening, opera, and reading.

== Death ==
She died of complications from dementia on August 25, 2017, in Mill Creek at age 87, surrounded by family while listening to opera.

== Legacy and honors ==
SPD honored her contributions to the police department with a memorial featuring bagpipes and an honor guard. She is cited in law enforcement literature as one of the earliest women to break the command barrier in major U.S. police departments.

== See also ==
- Women in law enforcement
- Seattle Police Department
- United States Marshals Service
