= Adrian Z. Diaz =

Former police chief in Seattle, Washington, US

Adrian Diaz

Chief of the Seattle Police Department
- In office September 2, 2020 – May 29, 2024
- Mayor: Jenny Durkan; Bruce Harrell
- Preceded by: Carmen Best
- Succeeded by: Sue Rahr

Personal details
- Education: Central Washington University (BA); University of Washington (MPA)

Adrian Z. Diaz is an American law enforcement officer who served as the chief of the Seattle Police Department from 2020 to 2024. Diaz had previously served as deputy chief of the department. Diaz assumed office in an acting capacity on September 2, 2020, following the resignation of Carmen Best. On September 20, 2022, Diaz was appointed to the permanent position.

Diaz and the Seattle Police Department are facing lawsuits relating to sex and race discrimination from officers in the department. On May 29, 2024, Mayor Bruce Harrell announced that Diaz was removed from his position as chief and subsequently reassigned to another division. Former King County Sheriff Sue Rahr was appointed as the interim chief of the department.

Diaz was fired as of December 17, 2024. The city claims that Diaz had an affair with Jamie Tompkins, who had been hired from the evening anchor desk at KCPQ to become Diaz' Chief of Staff. Tompkins had resigned on November 6, 2024.

== Early life and education ==
Born in Santa Ana, California, Diaz was raised in Anaheim, California and Mercer Island, Washington. Diaz earned a Bachelor of Arts in criminal justice from Central Washington University and a Master of Public Administration from the University of Washington. Diaz has stated his father was a police officer while serving in the Air Force and later managed a grocery store. His older brother also works for Seattle Police Department.

== Career ==
Diaz stated he worked managing grocery stores before joining the Seattle Police Department. He also worked as a wrestling coach. He began his career with the department as a bike patrolman and undercover officer and expressed uncertainty if he really wanted to be a police officer. Diaz also works as a Master Defensive Tactics instructor at the Washington State Criminal Justice Training Commission.

== Personal life ==
Diaz came out as gay in June 2024, amid allegations of discrimination and retaliation and a $5 million tort claim filed against him by 4 female officers. He was also sued by a police captain for discrimination and retaliation. In October 2024, Diaz sued the city of Seattle for $10 million for discrimination, harassment and retaliation. He was on paid administrative leave at the time with a $338,000 salary.
