= Carmen Best =

American former police chief in Seattle (born 1965)

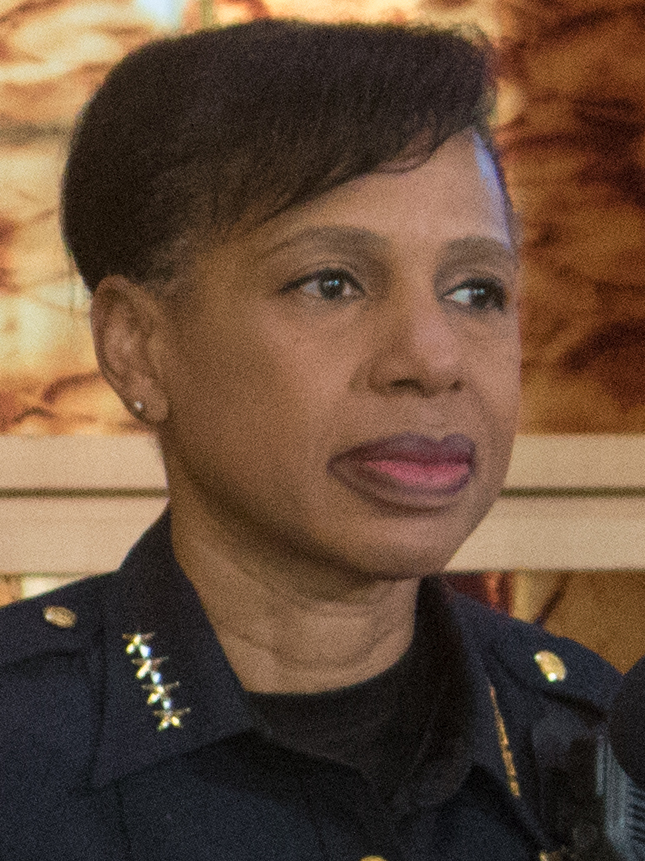
- Best in 2018

Chief of the Seattle Police Department
- In office August 13, 2018 – September 2, 2020
- Mayor: Jenny Durkan
- Preceded by: Kathleen O'Toole
- Succeeded by: Adrian Diaz

Personal details
- Born: c. 1965 (age 60–61) Tacoma, Washington, U.S.
- Education: Northeastern University (MS)

Carmen Best (born c. 1965) is an American former law enforcement officer who served as the chief of police of the Seattle Police Department from 2018 to 2020. She was the first black woman to lead Seattle's police force. She was chief of police during the George Floyd protests. She announced her resignation in August 2020 following budget cuts, and officially left office on September 2, 2020. Best currently serves as Director of Global Security Risk Operations at Microsoft.

== Early life and education ==
Best was born in Tacoma, Washington and attended Lincoln High School. She attended Eastern Washington University, where she competed on the track team. She completed a bachelor's degree from Western Illinois University in 2014. She earned a certificate in police management from the University of Washington and Master of Science degree in criminal justice from Northeastern University in 2018. She completed training programs at the FBI National Executive Institute, FBI National Academy, Criminal Justice Executive Leadership Academy, and Major Cities Chiefs Association Police Executive Leadership Institute.

== Career ==
She was hired by the Seattle Police Department in 1992 and, prior to being appointed chief, had held the ranks of officer, sergeant, lieutenant, captain, and deputy chief. She took over as interim chief of police on January 1, 2018, replacing Kathleen O'Toole, and was later appointed permanent chief by Seattle Mayor Jenny Durkan, effective from August 13, 2018. She became the first black woman to serve as Seattle's chief of police.

Best was chief of police during the 2020 George Floyd Protests. During the June 1st protests in the Capitol Hill neighborhood, police in full riot gear barricaded the SPD's East precinct building from protesters, using blast balls, flash bang grenades, and pepper spray against the crowd "at times with little provocation", according to The Spokesman-Review. After the first weekend of protests, there were 12,000 complaints against Seattle police for use of excessive force. On June 5, Mayor Jenny Durkan and SPD Chief Carmen Best announced a 30-day ban on the use of tear gas, but on June 7 used tear gas and flash bangs against a crowd outside the East precinct. Best defended the use of tear gas, saying that the 30 day ban exempts SWAT officers and "life safety issues". On June 8, a decision was made by Assistant Chief Tom Mahaffey to retreat from the East Precinct, which led to the establishment of the Capitol Hill Occupied Protest.

The role that Best played in the decision to retreat from the East Precinct, and to use tear gas on protestors during the protests, is unclear because she deleted more than 27,000 text messages by hand from her city-owned mobile device. Best has acknowledged that she deleted the messages from the June 2020 protests, and has claimed that the messages were "transitory," in other words that they did not contain any significant information. By the time she deleted the text messages, the city was already facing multiple lawsuits and public records requests over the handling of the protests, which legally required her to keep the text messages, even if they were transitory. Deleting the texts violated state law, however, in September 2023 King County prosecutors declined to press state criminal charges against Best and others, stating that there was "no legal basis to file criminal charges." Instead, the office determined that the problem had been a "perfect storm" of failure in record-keeping safeguards and training. Then-Mayor Jenny Durkan and Fire Chief Harold Scoggins also deleted their text messages from this period. In February 2023, the City of Seattle paid $600,000 in a lawsuit due to the deletion of texts by Best, Durkan, and Scoggins, after a federal judge deemed that they had intentionally destroyed evidence related to their handling of protests and the CHOP.

On August 1, 2020, a group of less than 100 protestors marched towards Best's home in Snohomish County, but were blocked by neighbors who displayed guns. Best described the group of protestors as large and aggressive, and supported her neighbors' response to them.

On August 10, 2020, after the Seattle City Council voted to downsize the department by about 100 officers, Best resigned, stating that she could not in good conscience shrink and thereby reduce diversity in the department which she had just grown by 110 officers in 2019, (with 40% of those new hires being persons of color) noting that under police union rules, the last hired would be the first to be laid off, disproportionately affecting officers of color. Best was replaced by Assistant Chief Adrian Z. Diaz in an interim capacity.

On October 19, 2020, it was announced that Best would join KING-TV as law enforcement analyst. In 2021, Best published Black in Blue: Lessons on Leadership, Breaking Barriers, and Racial Reconciliation.

Following the 2021 election of Eric Adams, it was reported that Best was on the shortlist to become the first woman to lead the New York City Police Department; however, she was not selected for the position.
