= New Order of Cincinnatus =

1930s political organization in Seattle, Washington

The New Order of Cincinnatus (NOOC) was a young men's political organization established in Seattle, Washington in the 1930s. The short-lived "conservative and moralistic reform group" was a municipal party that challenged both the Democratic and Republican parties, electing David Lockwood (in 1934) and Frederick G. Hamley, a lawyer, public official and judge, and Arthur B. Langlie (in 1935) to the Seattle City Council. Lockwood, age 26 at the time of his election, was the youngest person ever to sit on the council. In 1938, Langlie became Seattle mayor, but by then the NOOC was fading. During its brief existence, the group spread beyond Seattle, and was active in Tacoma, Washington, Portland, Oregon, and San Francisco.

== The nature of NOOC ==
An outgrowth of Seattle's non-partisan Municipal League, named for the Roman farmer and statesman Cincinnatus, the NOOC was founded in September 1933 by approximately 10 young men including Seattle attorney Ralph Bushnell Potts. Potts, who Richard C. Berner describes as the "prime mover and first commander" of the NOOC, had resigned from the presidency of the Consolidated Republican Clubs of King County to start the group. The NOOC's idealistic, mostly middle-class professional supporters reacted against both political corruption and labor unionism. They required the candidates they supported to disaffiliate from the established political parties and to limit campaign contributions to US$25. A May 1934 NOOC leaflet called for a "rebirth of political idealism among the younger citizens of America… [T]he major political parties have become nothing but job-hunting cliques… Cincinnatus advocates a Spartan-like devotion to honesty, efficiency, and ability in government." The group called for a reduction of 40% in Seattle city taxes, in a context where the city had already made large cuts: by the time the NOOC had a significant foothold on the city council, opposing councilman James Scavotto could argue that the city had already cut operating costs 50% in five years.

The NOOC also advocated a vastly increased state-level police constabulary, with no intermediate levels between the state and municipalities. This police force would consist entirely of men under age 40, trained by a State Police School, and enlisting for a military-style four-year term rather than being free to resign at any time.

The NOOC restricted its membership to men ages 21 to 35, and was organized along military lines to the point of resembling a fascist organization. By December 1933, Potts had built the NOOC into an organization with 17 divisions in Washington State each headed by a "captain"; statewide officers were "majors" and "colonels". In early 1934, 50 Cincinnatans marched to city hall to file three candidate petitions for city council, all of them dressed in white shirts and green and yellow headpieces (the colors of Seattle's Roosevelt High School). They used a slightly rewritten version of Sigmund Romberg's "Stout Hearted Men" as their anthem. This "proto-fascist" style was a matter of tension within the organization from the outset. NOOC councilman Frederick Hamley's diary indicates that he and his fellow councilman David Lockwood generally disliked this aspect of the group and focused mainly on local municipal issues. In February 1934 they and others defeated a proposal that the members of the organization should routinely stand and salute Potts when he entered the room.

== History in Seattle ==
=== 1934 ===
NOOC formed in September 1933. The next month they demanded the resignation of King County Commissioner John C. Stevenson (born John C. Stockman). Stevenson had avoided extradition to New York, where he was wanted for stock fraud; the NOOC further accused him of mismanagement of the county relief. They failed, but the attention gained encouraged them to run candidates for public office themselves. David Lockwood, Wellington Rhinehart, and Lloyd Johnson filed to run in the February 1934 primaries. Their total campaign budget was less than US$600.

Seattle City Council offices are officially nonpartisan, and there is no official acknowledgment or a party or ticket. These three NOOC candidates in 1934 got around this by all listing "Cincinnatus" as their middle names on the ballot, which the election officials permitted. In this period, three of the nine Seattle City Council positions were up for election each year, with the top six candidates in the primary election going on to a general election.

The NOOC candidates were supported by the Washington Taxpayers Council, as was conservative incumbent John E. Carroll. Of the Cincinnatans, only Lockwood made it through the primaries, but he gained office despite a complete lack of newspaper endorsements, coming in second in the general election. He took office in June amidst the Maritime Strike of 1934, which had led to lethal violence in Seattle.

Elected mayor at the same time Lockwood joined the council was Charles William Smith. Smith and his police chief, W. B. Kirtley, undoubtedly tolerated Seattle's then-longstanding police corruption. Lockwood further accused Smith of profiting personally from this corruption and tied Smith's toleration of corruption to his toleration of a growing budget deficit. Among the remedies he proposed were a fixed term for police chiefs, making the chief more independent of the mayor (and thereby separating the mayor from any system of police payoffs).

Carried away by their success in Seattle and the interest in forming other chapters around the state, the NOOC contested the statewide November elections. Among their candidates were William J. Wilkins for U. S. Senate, Cecil R. Fuller for the 1st District congressional seat, and John W. Day for King County Prosecutor. Running with great enthusiasm but very little budget, they did not elect anyone, but did have the best third-party results of any slate since the Bull Moosers in 1912.

=== 1935 ===
In the 1935 election, the NOOC ran only two candidates for the three available city council seats, endorsing former PTA president Mildred Powell for the third seat. Originally the two NOOC candidates were to be Frederick Hamley and Leo Mortland, but the latter was a bit too enthusiastic in identifying as a Republican. When he gleefully announced his endorsement by the 36th District Republican Club, the NOOC decided he was no longer their candidate and replaced him with Arthur Langlie (although Langlie was never an official member of the NOOC).

Incumbents William Gaines, Frank Fitts, and David Levine chose to campaign jointly, with the backing of the Central Labor Council and the newly formed Washington Commonwealth Federation. They accused the NOOC of being a "secret organization" and intending to impose a "fascist dictatorship". Nonetheless, Langlie and Frederick Hamley led in the primaries, followed by the incumbents; the sixth candidate was the NOOC-endorsed Powell. This time, Langlie and Hamley gained the endorsements of all three major dailies. Of the incumbents, only Levine secured any such endorsement, from the Seattle Star. Langlie and Hamley came in as the top two in the general election. Powell was also elected. It was Levine's only defeat in a political career lasting more than three decades. Because of some resignations, Langlie and Hamley took office immediately after the election.

Secure in the knowledge that they needed only one other council vote to override any mayoral veto, the three NOOC council members used these council positions to investigate corruption and to reduce city spending. Lockwood updated proposals he already had for a central purchasing office and a central garage; he also framed a response to municipally owned Seattle City Light's proposal to buy out the Seattle operations of the Puget Sound Power and Light Company, which the NOOC opposed. Hamlie and Langlie were assigned to investigate the city's street railway system, which was in chronic financial trouble, and the police department. As they turned up substantial evidence of police corruption, it became clear that Powell would also be interested in proposals to reform the police. The council voted 5 to 4 for a budget that would cut 120 city jobs, mainly in the police and fire departments and public schools. Mayor Smith vetoed this, and his veto was sustained because Powell opposed the school cuts. The city budget was put on hold until September.

Meanwhile, the Seattle Post-Intelligencer attacked Mayor Smith for running a "wide open" city, for refusing to make cuts in the departments controlled by the mayor's office, for being associated with a corrupt police-based political machine, and for a recent upsurge in illegal gambling, prostitution, and Sunday liquor sales. The P-I was not alone in these views: The Argus compared Smith to the legendarily corrupt Hiram Gill and the United States Navy made it known that they were considering placing the entire city of Seattle off limits for sailors on leave. Further condemnations of this state of affairs came from the Clean Government League, the Morals Committee of the Council of Churches, and the Philippine-American Chronicle, which published detailed exposés of the "Chinese Gambling Syndicate" and the police's policy of closing down only the "small fry".

In hearings, Chief W. B. Kirtley argued that the police were expending a great deal of effort dealing with numerous labor strikes and could hardly stand staff cuts. He acknowledged that the police made a "liberal construction" of city ordinances but said that he opposed "fanatical enforcement of the laws". He hinted broadly that some of the pillars of the church who opposed gambling actually profited from it as landlords, and might not be pleased with zealous enforcement. When talked of the material difficulty of raiding gambling dens (which usually had effective routes of escape), the Cincinnatans insisted on his accompanying them out of the hearing room to the openly operating Battersby and Smith's card room near First Avenue and Madison Street. Kirtley could hardly deny the evidence in front of his eyes: he ordered police to trash the establishment and to confiscate the money. None of the confiscated money ever made it to the police evidence room.

=== 1936 and after ===
All of this was dramatic, but had few concrete results. A five-year term was established for the position of police chief. Token arrests were made in gambling and vice, but the wave soon passed. In January 1936, 60 positions were cut from the department and three precinct stations closed, but the cuts were overturned in the spring elections, which did not go well for the NOOC. In a complicated mayoral election amidst shifting alliances, Langlie lost the general election to former mayor John Dore, whom Smith had bested in 1934. Although Dore in his previous term had responded to the onset of the Great Depression by cutting many city jobs and reduced wages, he now promised a reversal of these policies. This and other promises gained him the backing of organized labor in general and Dave Beck of the Teamsters Union in particular. The all-round labor victory also returned David Levine to the city council. Dore announced, "This election means the end of fascist, semi-military organizations and of dictatorship in Seattle." Conversely, it brought to power a labor-based political machine.

Lockwood lost his council seat in the 1937 elections. Langlie, meanwhile, set his sights again on the mayoralty. Amidst a city fiscal crisis and a complete lack of aid from the state government of Governor Clarence D. Martin, The chaotic election of 1938 saw Langlie faced off against an ailing Dore (who spent most of the campaign period in the hospital, with his son John, Jr. acting as campaign spokesman) and the flamboyant Vic Meyers, a locally famous jazz musician and bandleader who had backed into politics as a joke candidate in 1932, but who after becoming increasingly serious about the matter had become lieutenant governor. Meyers, allied with the industrial unionists, including the Congress of Industrial Organizations (CIO), opposed Dore from the left, Langlie from the right. Initially the main thrust of his campaign was an attack on the Dore/Beck alliance, which he accused of amounting to "racketeering". This "'racket' talk" did not go over well with the Argus or the city's business community, who were in general happy with the collaborationist truce that had suspended Seattle's long labor war, and who also saw this rhetoric as bad for the city's image in the eyes of the rest of the country. Courting their support, Langlie toned down this rhetoric and re-focused on NOOC's tax-cutting agenda and the city's agenda. Meanwhile, he plotted with the Municipal League against Meyers: their intent was to disqualify Meyers by showing that he had not paid Seattle city taxes during his stint in Olympia (the state capital), but to hold back this attack until such time as it would be too late for another candidate of the same faction to enter the race. Dore attacked Meyers as well, red-baiting him and the CIO by tying them to the Communist Party (CPUSA). In the primary Langlie won big and Dore lost big: Langlie garnered 51,175 votes, Meyers 27,436, Dore 21,480; an additional candidate, William Norton, took 10,457 votes, leaving Langlie to face Meyers in the general election.

A resounding, unsolicited Communist endorsement for Meyers in the general election as the "New Deal candidate" running against a "reactionary" entirely backfired against Meyers and even Franklin Roosevelt's New Deal, and left the CIO and the Washington Commonwealth Federation (WCF) looking like communist fronts. Langlie won 80,149 to 48,563. The gravely ill Dore was relieved of his office by the city council on April 13, 1938 (and died five days later); Langlie began his term early. In the wake of Langlie's election, Governor Martin finally came to the city's financial aid, so Langlie expected to face a lesser fiscal crisis than his predecessor. This was, however, balanced or overbalanced by state Social Security Board administrator Charles F. Ernst cutting the relief rolls by 20%, removing over 12,000 Seattleites (and at least 8,000 elsewhere in King County) during one of the harshest periods of the Depression. In office, Langlie immediately overturned a rule that garbage collectors would be paid the prevailing wage. This was the first of a series of Seattle wage cuts (and strikes), most won by employers including the city government. Over the next year, Langlie continued to fight against the power of labor in general and the Teamsters in particular and also revived the NOOC's fight against police corruption, but had to focus mainly on solving Seattle's financial crisis. Among his successes was the resolution of the longstanding crisis over the city's streetcar system: he obtained a US$10.2 million federal grant to pay off the debts and replace the entire system with a network of buses and trackless trolleybuses. He had the good fortune that the start of World War II in Europe led to a rise in defense production, from which Seattle benefitted greatly. He also obtained federal funding to build the Ballard Bridge and West Seattle Viaduct and to repair recreational facilities. In short, he succeeded in running his fiscally conservative administration by obtaining funds from the liberal Democratic federal government.

By 1939 the NOOC had disbanded and Langlie formally identified as Republican. He easily won re-election as mayor in spring 1940, and, as the Republican candidate, won the state governorship in the November 1940 election.

== The San Francisco chapter ==
The San Francisco chapter of the NOOC was founded by Pat Brown, later Democratic Governor of California, in 1935. It completely lacked the Seattle chapter's militaristic tendencies, but shared its call for an end to "partisan bickering". It quickly gained over 500 members and established a headquarters on Market Street. The San Francisco chapter soon launched an effort towards the ousting of incumbent members on the San Francisco Board of Supervisors, seeking to root out the corruption of those on the Board. After offering enforcement and assistance to a group of rival candidates, the chapter was successful in deposing four of the bureaucrats on the Board and in placing one of their own candidates (Dewey Meade) on the Board. Its main long-term political effect was to bring Brown to prominence.

== Other chapters ==
In addition to Seattle and San Francisco, among the towns and cities that had Cincinnatus chapters were Bellingham, Bremerton, Chehalis, Everett, Kirkland, Spokane, Tacoma, and Wenatchee, all in Washington; and Portland, Oregon.

== Cincinnatus' platform ==
According to Ralph Potts writing in 1955, Cincinnatus' platform was:

1. To bring about a renaissance in politics and to promote a Spartan-like devotion to honesty, cleanliness, efficiency, and economy in government.
2. To clean out graft, corruption, and hypocrisy in our public offices.
3. To modernize state, county, and local government and to eliminate all duplicating phases thereof.
4. To eliminate waste in governmental machinery and to work for a substantial reduction in the tax burden the average taxpayer is forced to bear.
