= Robert H. Harlin =

American politician

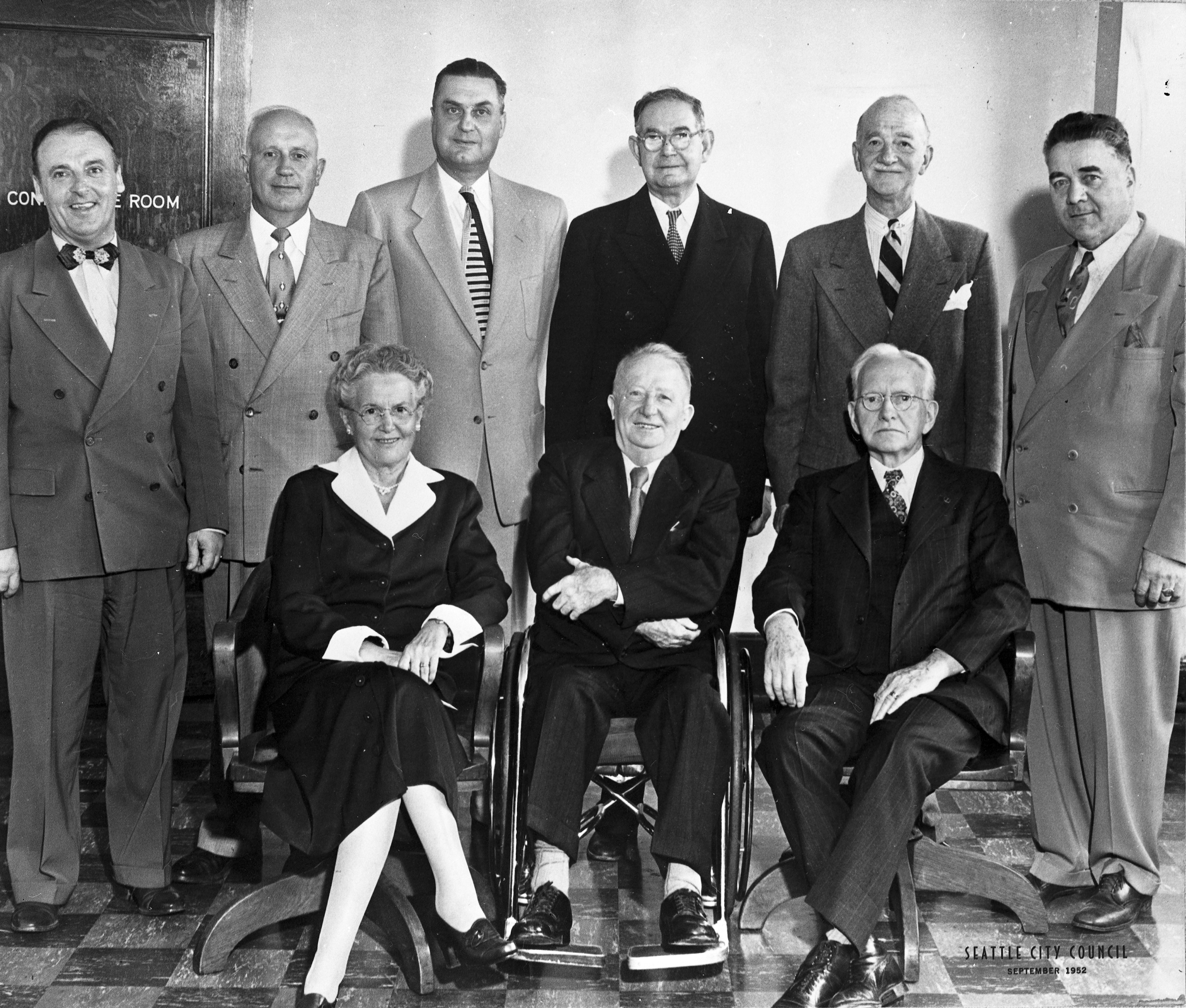
Harlin (center) on the Seattle City Council in 1952

Robert H. Harlin (1882/1883–February 11, 1962) was the mayor of Seattle, Washington from 1931 to 1932.

Harlin was born in England. Harlin and his wife Sarah Harlin emigrated to the United States in 1908.

Harlin served as president of the United Mine Workers for district 10 from 1919 to 1921. Before that he was the statistician for the national office of the United Mine Workers in Indianapolis, Indiana. Harlin ran for national president of United Mine Workers in 1920 on the platform that miners had the right to strike.

In 1921 Harlin served on the Seattle coal commission.

Harlin was elected to the Seattle City Council in 1929, where he would serve in several stints until 1956. He was appointed as Mayor of Seattle on July 14, 1931, after Mayor Frank E. Edwards was ousted in a recall election. He ran for re-election in March 1932, losing to John F. Dore, and returned to the city council the following year. Harlin resigned from the city council on May 5, 1941, after his appointment as director of the state department of Labor and Industries. He returned to the city council in 1945, as an appointee to finish the term of John E. Carroll. He was defeated in June 1956.

Harlin had both of his legs amputated due to a circulatory illness later in his life. He died, age 79, on February 11, 1962, of complications from pneumonia.
