= 2019 Seattle City Council election =

- November 5, 2019; Officially nonpartisan

7 seats on the Seattle City Council 5 seats needed for a majority
- Composition of the Seattle City Council by political party (Note: Officially nonpartisan)
President of the City Council before election
Bruce Harrell
Nonpartisan
Elected President of the City Council
Lorena González
Nonpartisan

The 2019 Seattle City Council election was held on November 5, 2019. Seven seats of the nine-member Seattle City Council were up for election. Four incumbent members of the city council did not run for reelection, while the remaining three incumbents all won reelection.

Sally Bagshaw, Bruce Harrell, Rob Johnson, and Mike O'Brien all announced that they would not seek reelection to the city council. Andrew J. Lewis defeated Jim Pugel to succeed Bagshaw, Tammy Morales defeated Mark Solomon to succeed Harrell, Alex Pedersen defeated Shaun Scott to succeed Johnson, and Dan Strauss defeated Heidi Wills to succeed O'Brien. Incumbent councilors Lisa Herbold, Debora Juarez, and Kshama Sawant ran for and won reelection.

The amount of money spent during the campaign doubled from the 2015 election, with Amazon spending $1.5 million to support multiple candidates, including Egan Orion against Sawant and Pedersen's campaign.

== Background ==
The districts of the Seattle City Council were reorganized into geographic districts starting in the 2015 election instead of the previously used at-large districts. Forty-seven candidates ran in the 2015 city council election, which was the most up to that point, and more than the twenty-nine candidates who ran in the 1997 election. Over fifty candidates ran in the 2019 election.

Mayor Ed Murray did not seek reelection in the 2017 mayoral election which was won by Jenny Durkan. Murray resigned on September 13, 2017, and was replaced by Bruce Harrell as temporary mayor, who was later replaced by Tim Burgess.

== Campaign ==
=== District 1 ===
Lisa Herbold, who had served on the city council since her election in 2015, announced on January 30, 2019, that she would run for reelection. Phil Tavel, an activist, launched his campaign on January 31. Brendan Kolding, a police officer, announced his campaign in January. During the campaign, he was recommended for firing after an internal investigation by the Seattle Police Department determined that he had lied about his mistreatment of another officer.

Herbold and Tavel placed first and second in the primary, and Herbold defeated Tavel in the general election.

2019 Seattle City Council 1st district primary
Party	Candidate	Votes	%
Nonpartisan	Lisa Herbold (incumbent)	13,405	50.62%
Nonpartisan	Phil Tavel	8,558	32.32%
Nonpartisan	Brendan Kolding	4,435	16.75%
Write-in		85	0.32%
Total votes		26,483	100.00%

2019 Seattle City Council District 1 debate
No.	Date	Host	Moderator	Link	Nonpartisan	Nonpartisan
Key: P Participant A Absent N Not invited I Invited W Withdrawn						
Key: P Participant A Absent N Not invited I Invited W Withdrawn					Lisa Herbold	Phil Tavel
1	Oct. 11, 2019	Seattle CityClub		YouTube	P	P

2019 Seattle City Council 1st district election
Party	Candidate	Votes	%
Nonpartisan	Lisa Herbold (incumbent)	20,033	55.71%
Nonpartisan	Phil Tavel	15,787	43.90%
Write-in		139	0.39%
Total votes		35,959	100.00%

=== District 2 ===
Tammy Morales, a member of the Democratic Socialists of America who had run in the 2015 election, announced on January 7, 2019, that she would run for a seat on the city council from the 2nd district. Harrell, who had served on the city council since his election in 2007, announced on January 8 that he would not seek reelection. Phyllis Porter, an educator and community organizer, announced her campaign on January 17. Christopher Peguero announced his campaign on January 21. Ari Hoffman, Matthew Perkins, and Mark Solomon also ran in the election.

Morales and Solomon placed first and second in the primary, and Morales defeated Solomon in the general election.

2019 Seattle City Council 2nd district primary
Party	Candidate	Votes	%
Nonpartisan	Tammy Morales	10,630	50.07%
Nonpartisan	Mark Solomon	4,923	23.19%
Nonpartisan	Ari Hoffman	2,451	11.54%
Nonpartisan	Phyllis Porter	1,254	5.91%
Nonpartisan	Chris Peguero	1,000	4.71%
Nonpartisan	Omari Tahir-Garrett	607	2.86%
Nonpartisan	Henry Dennison	304	1.43%
Write-in		61	0.29%
Total votes		22,172	100.00%

2019 Seattle City Council District 2 debate
No.	Date	Host	Moderator	Link	Nonpartisan	Nonpartisan
Key: P Participant A Absent N Not invited I Invited W Withdrawn						
Key: P Participant A Absent N Not invited I Invited W Withdrawn					Tammy Morales	Mark Solomon
1	Sep. 17, 2019	Seattle CityClub	Preston Phillips	YouTube	P	P

2019 Seattle City Council 2nd district election
Party	Candidate	Votes	%
Nonpartisan	Tammy Morales	16,379	60.47%
Nonpartisan	Mark Solomon	10,586	39.08%
Write-in		121	0.45%
Total votes		27,086	100.00%

=== District 3 ===
Beto Yarce, a business owner, announced on November 29, 2018, that he would run for city council, but later dropped out on February 19, 2019. Kshama Sawant, who was first elected in the 2013 election and was the only Socialist Alternative member on the city council, filed to run for reelection on January 11, 2019, and launched her campaign on January 24, becoming the first incumbent city councilor to do so. Egan Orion, the head of the United States Chamber of Commerce in Capitol Hill, announced his campaign on April 2, in response to Yarce dropping out. Zachary DeWolf, a member of the Seattle School Board, announced on April 9 that he would run in the election. Pat Murakami, an activist, Ami Nguyen, a public defender, and Logan Bowers, a business owner, also ran.

Bowers filed a complaint against Sawant during the campaign alleging that Sawant had used city funds and resources to be used by Socialist Alternative. Sawant and Orion placed first and second in the primary, and Sawant defeated Orion in the general election. Orion conceded to Sawant on November 12. Sawant won despite receiving 37% of the vote in the primary, which was the worst performance for a winning incumbent city councilor in a primary since Richard McIver won reelection after receiving 39% in the 2005 primary.

2019 Seattle City Council 3rd district primary
Party	Candidate	Votes	%
Nonpartisan	Kshama Sawant (incumbent)	12,088	36.71%
Nonpartisan	Egan Orion	7,078	21.49%
Nonpartisan	Pat Murakami	4,279	12.99%
Nonpartisan	Zachary DeWolf	4,147	12.59%
Nonpartisan	Ami Nguyen	3,028	9.20%
Nonpartisan	Logan Bowers	2,250	6.83%
Write-in		59	0.18%
Total votes		33,599	100.00%

2019 Seattle City Council District 3 debate
No.	Date	Host	Moderator	Link	Nonpartisan	Nonpartisan
Key: P Participant A Absent N Not invited I Invited W Withdrawn						
Key: P Participant A Absent N Not invited I Invited W Withdrawn					Kshama Sawant	Egan Orion
1	Sep. 27, 2019	Seattle CityClub	Chris Daniels		P	P

2019 Seattle City Council 3rd district election
Party	Candidate	Votes	%
Nonpartisan	Kshama Sawant (incumbent)	22,263	51.83%
Nonpartisan	Egan Orion	20,488	47.70%
Write-in		205	0.48%
Total votes		42,956	100.00%

=== District 4 ===
Rob Johnson announced that he would not seek reelection after having served one term on the city council, stating that he had told his wife that he would only serve one term. Shaun Scott, a member of the Democratic Socialists of America who served as a delegate for Bernie Sanders, announced his campaign in an article in The Stranger. Alex Pedersen ran in the election and was the first candidate to qualify for democracy vouchers.

2019 Seattle City Council District 4 candidate forum
No.	Date	Host	Moderator	Link	Nonpartisan	Nonpartisan	Nonpartisan	Nonpartisan	Nonpartisan	Nonpartisan	Nonpartisan	Nonpartisan	Nonpartisan	Nonpartisan
Key: P Participant A Absent N Not invited I Invited W Withdrawn														
Key: P Participant A Absent N Not invited I Invited W Withdrawn					Sasha Anderson	Ethan Hunter	Frank Krueger	Beth Mountsier	Emily Myers	Joshua Newman	Alex Pedersen	Shaun Scott	Heidi Stuber	Cathy Tuttle
1	Jun. 8, 2019	Washington's 43rd legislative district Democrats	Dae Shik Kim Hawkins Jr.	YouTube	N	P	P	P	P	P	P	P	P	P

Pedersen and Scott placed first and second in the primary, and Pedersen defeated Scott in the general election.

2019 Seattle City Council 4th district primary
Party	Candidate	Votes	%
Nonpartisan	Alex Pedersen	10,447	40.36%
Nonpartisan	Shaun Scott	6,020	23.26%
Nonpartisan	Emily Myers	3,326	12.85%
Nonpartisan	Cathy Tuttle	3,322	12.83%
Nonpartisan	Heidi Stuber	981	3.79%
Nonpartisan	Beth Mountsier	718	2.77%
Nonpartisan	Sasha Anderson	328	1.27%
Nonpartisan	Joshua Newman	317	1.22%
Nonpartisan	Frank A. Krueger	237	0.92%
Nonpartisan	Ethan Hunter	119	0.46%
Write-in		71	0.27%
Total votes		26,744	100.00%

2019 Seattle City Council District 4 debate
No.	Date	Host	Moderator	Link	Nonpartisan	Nonpartisan
Key: P Participant A Absent N Not invited I Invited W Withdrawn						
Key: P Participant A Absent N Not invited I Invited W Withdrawn					Alex Pedersen	Shaun Scott
1	Oct. 5, 2019	Seattle CityClub	Mark Baumgarten	YouTube	P	P

2019 Seattle City Council 4th district election
Party	Candidate	Votes	%
Nonpartisan	Alex Pedersen	16,954	51.94%
Nonpartisan	Shaun Scott	15,568	47.69%
Write-in		119	0.36%
Total votes		32,641	100.00%

=== District 5 ===
Ann Davison Sattler announced her campaign for city council on January 23, 2019. Debora Juarez, who was first elected in 2015, announced that she would seek reelection on January 25. Juarez and Sattler placed first and second in the primary, and Juarez defeated Sattler in the general election.

2019 Seattle City Council 5th district primary
Party	Candidate	Votes	%
Nonpartisan	Debora Juarez (incumbent)	11,085	45.10%
Nonpartisan	Ann Davison Sattler	6,564	26.71%
Nonpartisan	John Lombard	3,201	13.02%
Nonpartisan	Tayla Mahoney	1,742	7.09%
Nonpartisan	Mark Mendez	1,558	6.34%
Nonpartisan	Alex Tsimerman	718	1.53%
Write-in		50	0.20%
Total votes		25,762	100.00%

2019 Seattle City Council District 5 debate
No.	Date	Host	Moderator	Link	Nonpartisan	Nonpartisan
Key: P Participant A Absent N Not invited I Invited W Withdrawn						
Key: P Participant A Absent N Not invited I Invited W Withdrawn					Debora Juarez	Ann Davison Sattler
1	Sep. 22, 2019	Seattle CityClub	Amy Radil	YouTube	P	P

2019 Seattle City Council 5th district election
Party	Candidate	Votes	%
Nonpartisan	Debora Juarez (incumbent)	19,532	60.59%
Nonpartisan	Ann Davison Sattler	12,588	39.05%
Write-in		114	0.35%
Total votes		32,234	100.00%

=== District 6 ===
Mike O'Brien, who was first elected in the 2009 election, announced on February 13, 2019, that he would not seek reelection. Dan Strauss, a policy advisor for Sally Bagshaw, announced his campaign on the same day as O'Brien's retirement announcement. Heidi Wills, who was one of three incumbents who lost reelection in the 2003 election after Strippergate, ran in the election.

Strauss and Wills placed first and second in the primary, and Strauss defeated Wills in the general election.

2019 Seattle City Council 6th district primary
Party	Candidate	Votes	%
Nonpartisan	Dan Strauss	11,328	34.15%
Nonpartisan	Heidi Wills	7,048	21.25%
Nonpartisan	Sergio Garcia	4,730	14.26%
Nonpartisan	Jay Fathi	4,367	13.16%
Nonpartisan	Kate Martin	1,137	3.43%
Nonpartisan	Jon Lisbin	1,063	3.20%
Nonpartisan	Jeremy Cook	829	2.50%
Nonpartisan	Melissa Hall	820	2.47%
Nonpartisan	Ed Pottharst	599	1.81%
Nonpartisan	John Peeples	452	1.36%
Nonpartisan	Joey Massa	299	0.90%
Nonpartisan	Terry Rice	287	0.87%
Nonpartisan	Kara Ceriello	146	0.44%
Write-in		67	0.20%
Total votes		25,762	100.00%

2019 Seattle City Council District 6 debate
No.	Date	Host	Moderator	Link	Nonpartisan	Nonpartisan
Key: P Participant A Absent N Not invited I Invited W Withdrawn						
Key: P Participant A Absent N Not invited I Invited W Withdrawn					Dan Strauss	Heidi Wills
1	Sep. 22, 2019	Seattle CityClub	Angela King	YouTube	P	P

2019 Seattle City Council 6th district election
Party	Candidate	Votes	%
Nonpartisan	Dan Strauss	23,868	55.65%
Nonpartisan	Heidi Wills	18,799	43.83%
Write-in		221	0.52%
Total votes		42,888	100.00%

=== District 7 ===
Sally Bagshaw, who had served since her election to the city council in 2009, announced on November 27, 2018, that she would not seek reelection. Andrew J. Lewis announced his campaign for city council on November 28, 2018. Jim Pugel, the former chief of the Seattle Police Department, announced his campaign for city council on January 29, 2019. Naveed Jamali, a former spy, also ran in the election.

Lewis and Pugel placed first and second in the primary, and Lewis defeated Pugel in the general election.

2019 Seattle City Council 7th district primary
Party	Candidate	Votes	%
Nonpartisan	Andrew J. Lewis	8,409	31.71%
Nonpartisan	Jim Pugel	6,566	24.76%
Nonpartisan	Daniela Lipscomb-Eng	2,591	9.77%
Nonpartisan	Michael George	2,460	9.28%
Nonpartisan	Gene Burrus	1,501	5.66%
Nonpartisan	Jason Williams	1,347	5.08%
Nonpartisan	Don Harper	1,265	4.77%
Nonpartisan	James Donaldson	824	3.11%
Nonpartisan	Naveed Jamali	788	2.97%
Nonpartisan	Isabelle J. Kerner	691	2.61%
Write-in		80	0.30%
Total votes		27,556	100.00%

2019 Seattle City Council District 6 debate
No.	Date	Host	Moderator	Link	Nonpartisan	Nonpartisan
Key: P Participant A Absent N Not invited I Invited W Withdrawn						
Key: P Participant A Absent N Not invited I Invited W Withdrawn					Andrew J. Lewis	Jim Pugel
1	Sep. 27, 2019	Seattle CityClub	Daniel Beekman	YouTube	P	P

2019 Seattle City Council 7th district election
Party	Candidate	Votes	%
Nonpartisan	Andrew J. Lewis	18,336	52.98%
Nonpartisan	Jim Pugel	16,122	46.58%
Write-in		152	0.44%
Total votes		34,610	100.00%

== Campaign finance ==
$3,376,384 was spent in total during the 2015 election, with $669,340 being from independent political action committees and $2,707,044 coming from contributions to candidates. Campaign spending increased during the 2019 election, with $7,294,171 being spent in total, with $1,427,737 coming from democracy vouchers, $1,819,300 being contributions to candidates, and $4,047,134 being from independent political action committees.

The Civic Alliance for Sound Economy, the political action committee of the Seattle Metropolitan United States Chamber of Commerce which received over $200,000 in funding from Amazon, supported and gave money to Tavel, Solomon, Orion, Pedersen, Juares, Fathi, Wills, Pugel, and George during the campaign. Amazon contributed over $1.5 million during the election, compared to the $130,000 donated by the company and its employees during the 2015 election.

Candidate	Campaign committee				
Candidate	Raised	Spent	COH	L&D	District
Sasha Anderson	$49,046.58	$49,046.58	$0.00	$0.00	4th district
Logan Bowers	$93,668.19	$93,668.19	$0.00	$0.00	3rd district
Gene Burrus	$7,073.58	$7,073.58	$0.00	$0.00	7th district
Kara Ceriello	$1,378.32	$1,378.32	$0.00	$0.00	6th district
Jeremy Cook	$1,924.03	$1,924.03	$0.00	$0.00	6th district
Zachary DeWolf	$85,487.27	$85,487.27	$0.00	$0.00	3rd district
James Donaldson	$15,230.87	$15,230.87	$0.00	$0.00	7th district
Jay Fathi	$103,648.42	$103,648.42	$0.00	$0.00	6th district
Sergio Garcia	$74,981.38	$74,981.38	$0.00	$0.00	6th district
Michael George	$78,857.73	$78,857.73	$0.00	$0.00	7th district
Jesse Green	$8,630.00	$8,630.00	$0.00	$5,499.15	1st district
Melissa Hall	$59,630.07	$59,630.07	$0.00	$0.00	6th district
Don Harper	$21,445.00	$21,445.00	$0.00	$0.00	7th district
Lisa Herbold	$199,274.36	$199,274.36	$0.00	$0.00	1st district
Ari Hoffman	$93,356.58	$93,356.58	$0.00	$0.00	2nd district
Ethan Hunter	$9,491.65	$5,932.16	$3,559.49	$0.00	4th district
Naveed Jamali	$6,977.01	$6,977.01	$0.00	$0.00	7th district
Isabelle J. Kerner	$3,512.17	$3,512.17	$0.00	$0.00	7th district
Brendan Kolding	$74,999.00	$74,999.00	$0.00	$0.00	1st district
Frank Krueger	$3,056.19	$3,056.19	$0.00	$0.00	4th district
Andrew J. Lewis (politician)	$204,757.95	$204,757.95	$0.00	$0.00	7th district
Daniela Lipscomb-Eng	$61,614.89	$61,614.89	$0.00	$0.00	7th district
Jon Lisbin	$70,121.71	$70,121.71	$0.00	$0.00	6th district
John Lombard	$59,330.00	$59,330.00	$0.00	$0.00	5th district
Debora Juarez	$150,000.00	$150,000.00	$0.00	$0.00	5th district
Tayla Mahoney	$6,112.65	$5,377.49	$735.16	$0.00	5th district
Kate Martin	$60,055.42	$60,055.42	$0.00	$0.00	6th district
Joey Massa	$2,700.43	$2,700.43	$0.00	$0.00	6th district
Mark Mendez	$5,913.22	$4,063.80	$1,849.42	$3,383.68	5th district
Tammy Morales	$192,254.35	$192,254.35	$0.00	$0.00	2nd district
Beth Mountsier	$5,127.57	$5,127.57	$0.00	$0.00	4th district
Pat Murakami	$86,691.00	$86,691.00	$0.00	$0.00	3rd district
Emily Myers	$90,094.28	$90,094.28	$0.00	$0.00	4th district
Joshua Newman	$25,591.11	$25,591.11	$0.00	$0.00	4th district
Ami Nguyen	$93,659.77	$93,659.77	$0.00	$0.00	3rd district
Egan Orion	$403,881.92	$403,881.92	$0.00	$0.00	3rd district
Abel Pacheco	$9,686.00	$9,686.00	$0.00	$0.00	4th district
Alex Pedersen (politician)	$197,008.46	$195,560.06	$1,448.40	$0.00	3rd district
John Peeples	$3,198.00	$2,700.43	$1,190.19	$2,198.00	6th district
Christopher Peguero	$60,627.54	$60,627.54	$0.00	$0.00	2nd district
Matthew Perkins	$575.00	$23.92	$551.08	$0.00	2nd district
Phyllis Porter	$52,637.05	$52,637.05	$0.00	$0.00	2nd district
Ed Pottharst	$34,915.82	$34,915.82	$0.00	$0.00	6th district
Jim Pugel	$235,305.74	$235,305.74	$0.00	$0.00	7th district
Terry Rice	$34,527.40	$34,527.40	$0.00	$0.00	6th district
Christopher Rufo	$19,045.45	$19,103.86	-$58.41	$0.00	6th district
Ann Davison Sattler	$81,000.22	$81,000.22	$0.00	$11,795.61	5th district
Kshama Sawant	$587,141.43	$587,141.43	$0.00	$0.00	3rd district
Shaun Scott	$217,866.71	$217,866.71	$0.00	$0.00	4th district
Mark Solomon	$190,052.80	$190,052.80	$0.00	$0.00	2nd district
Dan Strauss	$202,743.37	$202,743.37	$0.00	$0.00	6th district
Heidi Stuber	$47,867.34	$47,867.34	$0.00	$0.00	4th district
Phil Tavel	$192,657.15	$192,657.15	$0.00	$0.00	1st district
Cathy Tuttle	$87,916.62	$87,916.62	$0.00	$0.00	4th district
Jason Williams	$77,842.29	$77,842.29	$0.00	$0.00	7th district
Heidi Wills	$267,005.06	$267,005.06	$0.00	$0.00	6th district
Beto Yarce	$17,467.71	$17,467.71	$0.00	$0.00	3rd district

== Endorsements ==
=== District 1 ===
Herbold endorsements

Organizations

- National Women's Political Caucus of Washington

Newspapers

- The Stranger (primary and general election)

=== District 2 ===
Morales endorsements

Federal officials

- Pramila Jayapal, member of the United States House of Representatives from Washington's 7th congressional district

Organizations

- King County Democrats
- National Women's Political Caucus of Washington
- Seattle Sierra Club

Newspapers

- The Stranger (primary and general election)
Solomon endorsements

Local officials

- Jenny Durkan, 56th Mayor of Seattle

=== District 3 ===
Nguyen endorsements

Organizations

- National Women's Political Caucus of Washington
Orion endorsements

Newspapers

- The Seattle Times
Sawant endorsements

State officials

- Nicole Macri, member of the Washington House of Representatives from the 43rd district
- Rebecca Saldaña, member of the Washington State Senate from the 37th district

Local officials

- Lorena González, member of the Seattle City Council from the 9th district (general election)
- Teresa Mosqueda, member of the Seattle City Council from the 8th district (general election)

Organizations

- National Women's Political Caucus of Washington
- Seattle Sierra Club

Newspapers

- The Stranger (primary and general election)

=== District 4 ===
Anderson endorsements

Organizations

- National Women's Political Caucus of Washington
Myers endorsements

Organizations

- National Women's Political Caucus of Washington
Scott endorsements

State officials

- Nicole Macri, member of the Washington House of Representatives from the 43rd district
- Rebecca Saldaña, member of the Washington State Senate from the 37th district

Local officials

- Lorena González, member of the Seattle City Council from the 9th district
- Teresa Mosqueda, member of the Seattle City Council from the 8th district

Organizations

- Seattle Sierra Club

Newspapers

- The Stranger (primary and general election)
Pedersen endorsements

Newspapers

- The Seattle Times of Washington

=== District 5 ===
Juarez endorsements

State officials

- Frank Chopp, Speaker of the Washington House of Representatives
- Jessyn Farrell, former member of the Washington House of Representatives from the 46th district
- Nicole Macri, member of the Washington House of Representatives from the 43rd district
- Javier Valdez, member of the Washington House of Representatives from the 46th district
- Brady Walkinshaw, former member of the Washington House of Representatives from the 43rd district

Local officials

- Sally Bagshaw, member of the Seattle City Council from the 7th district
- Tim Burgess, 55th Mayor of Seattle
- Jenny Durkan, 56th Mayor of Seattle
- Lorena González, member of the Seattle City Council from the 9th district
- Larry Gossett, member of the King County Council from the 2nd district
- Bruce Harrell, 54th Mayor of Seattle
- Rob Johnson, member of the Seattle City Council from the 4th district
- Jeanne Kohl-Welles, member of the King County Council from the 4th district
- Joe McDermott, member of the King County Council from the 8th district
- Teresa Mosqueda, member of the Seattle City Council from the 8th district
- Abel Pacheco Jr., member of the Seattle City Council from the 4th district
- Larry Phillips, former member of the King County Council from the 4th district
- Charles Royer, 48th Mayor of Seattle

Organizations

- EMILY's List
- King County Democrats
- National Women's Political Caucus of Washington
- Planned Parenthood
- Seattle Sierra Club

Newspapers

- The Stranger (primary and general election)

=== District 6 ===
Strauss endorsements

Newspapers

- The Stranger (primary and general election)
Wills endorsements

Organizations

- Seattle Sierra Club

=== District 7 ===
George endorsements

Organizations

- Seattle Sierra Club
Lewis endorsements

Newspapers

- The Stranger (primary and general election)
