= Maritza Rivera =

American politician

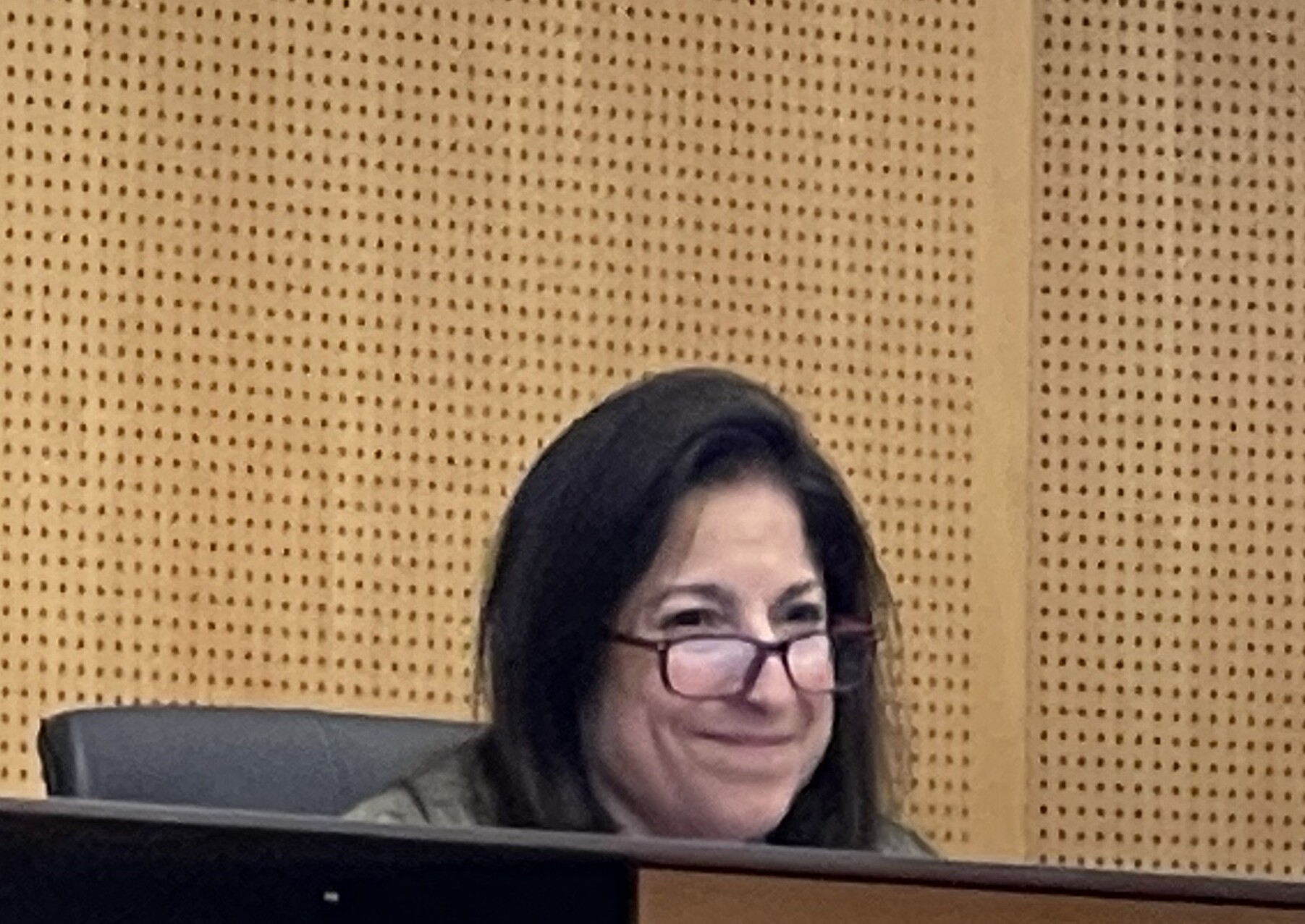
- Martiza Rivera 2025

Member of the Seattle City Council, District 4
- Incumbent
- Assumed office January 1, 2024
- Preceded by: Alex Pedersen

Personal details
- Born: Puerto Rico
- Spouse: Daniel Kully
- Children: 2 daughters
- Education: Skidmore College (BA); Fordham University (JD)

Maritza Rivera is a Seattle City Council member since January 2024 representing District 4.

== Biography ==
Rivera was born in Puerto Rico and grew up in the Bronx, in a low-income, Black and Brown majority neighborhood. Her father was a welder, and her mother worked at a factory.

Rivera graduated from the Bronx High School of Science, then earning her Bachelor's degree from Skidmore College before going to Fordham University School of Law.

After law school, Rivera joined the Clinton Administration as the associate director in the Office of Public Liaison for the Hispanic Community. Afterwards, she moved to Seattle where she worked for the American Civil Liberties Union. She then worked for centrist city councilmember Tom Rasmussen, before joining Mayor Jenny Durkan's administration.

When Mayor Bruce Harrell was elected, Rivera was appointed deputy director of the Office of Arts and Culture. In January 2023, 26 staff members of the Arts department signed a letter accusing Rivera of creating a toxic workplace and ignoring city policies. When asked about the letter, Rivera stated that "...change is really hard for folks. I’m really proud of the work that I did at [the Office of Arts & Culture]."

== Seattle city council ==
=== 2023 election ===
In March 2023, Rivera announced that she would run for city council, after Alex Pederson decided not to run for reelection. She decided to run after a deadly shooting at Ingraham High School, where her two daughters where present saying, "It was a terrifying experience for my family." Rivera focused her campaign on public safety, increasing police response times, getting guns off the street, and cracking down on open-air drug markets.

Rivera gathered large contributions from business Political Action Committees, including over $80,000 from a PAC created by former Costco CEO James Sinegal.

In the August primary, Rivera got second place with 31% of the vote behind progressive tech consultant Ron Davis who earned 45% of the vote. Both would advance to the November general election.

In the general election, Rivera and Davis ran similar policies related to housing and public safety, with Rivera having a centrist approach and Davis taking a progressive approach. Davis highlighted his ability to create positive workplaces and said of Rivera, “My opponent had 26 of her 40 former employees sign a letter saying that she created a toxic work environment and made it very difficult to do their work at the City of Seattle.” Rivera defended her time in the Arts department by reiterating her support from Mayor Harrell.

In the November general election, Rivera narrowly defeated Davis, 50% to 49%.

=== Tenure ===
In May 2023, councilmember Rivera proposed a budget amendment that would add additional requirements on money the Office of Planning and Community Development (OPCD) uses for its Equity Development Initiative, which faced pushback from the community and other councilmembers. The legislation would be tabled, and a revised, less stringent, amendment would pass the council. Rivera still supported her original amendment and said that opponents of the amendment were spreading misinformation.

In May 2024, while the full council was debating legislation over gig-worker pay, Rivera faced potential ethics violations over her husband prior consulting work with Doordash. In August 2026, Rivera recused herself on a vote related to banning pet fees and other housing "junk fees" because she is a landlord.

== Personal life ==
Rivera is married with two children. She lives in Ravenna.
