= Shaun Scott (politician) =

American politician and film director

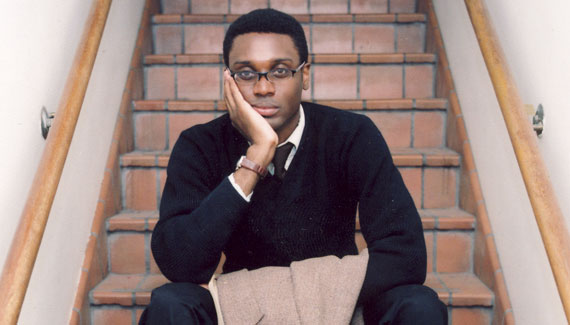
- Shaun Scott, 2009

Member of the Washington House of Representatives from the 43rd district
- Incumbent
- Assumed office January 13, 2025 Serving with Nicole Macri
- Preceded by: Frank Chopp

Personal details
- Born: November 8, 1984 (age 41) Queens, New York
- Party: Democratic
- Other political affiliations: Democratic Socialists of America
- Education: University of Washington
- Occupation: Film director, editor, politician

Shaun Scott (born November 8, 1984) is an American filmmaker, film director, writer, activist, and politician. A member of the Democratic Party, he represents Washington's 43rd legislative district in the Washington House of Representatives.

== Early life and career ==
Scott was born in Queens, New York and lived there until he was ten when he moved to Seattle. In 2008, he graduated from the University of Washington with a degree in history.

=== Film ===
After college, Scott became an Seattle-based independent filmmaker whose first feature film was "Seat of Empire" (2009), a 3-hour long documentary tour of the city of Seattle using archival footage. In 2010 he directed and wrote "Waste of Time," a historical mash-up of original footage, archival images, and contemporary music meant as a portrait of consumer capitalism.

Scott's first narrative feature was "100% OFF: A Recession-Era Romance" (2012), a docudrama about a kleptomaniac and the immigrant wife with whom he enters a marriage of convenience. It was followed in 2014 by "Pacific Aggression", a straightforward narrative about a social media addict and the blogger she stalks.

=== Writing ===
Scott began a career as a writer in late 2014, contributing pieces about American politics and race relations to The Monarch Review and The Seattle Weekly. In July 2015, Scott was hired by City Arts Magazine as a columnist, where he runs an ongoing thread called "Faded Signs" about popular culture under late capitalism.

In September 2015, Thought Catalog Books published Scott's short-form essay "Something Better: Millennials and Late Capitalism at the Movies" on iTunes and Amazon. In 2018, Zero Books published Scott's book-length history of the Millennial generation titled "Millennials and the Moments that Made Us: A Cultural History of the U.S. from 1982-present." In 2023, he wrote the book Heartbreak City: Seattle Sports and the Unmet Promise of Urban Progress through University of Washington press.

== Political career ==
Scott is a member of the 43rd LD Democrats and the Seattle chapter of the Democratic Socialists of America.

Scott was a field organizer for US Representative Pramila Jayapal and helped unionize Jayapal's 2018 campaign staff through the Campaign Worker's Guild. In 2020, Scott served as the Washington State Field Director for Presidential Candidate Bernie Sanders. In 2021, he was the campaign coordinator for Nikkita Oliver's city council campaign.

=== 2019 city council campaign ===
In November 2018, Scott announced his bid for Seattle City Council District 4 to replace interim council member Abel Pacheco Jr.. Scott focused his campaign on a progressive agenda, Green New Deal, affordable housing, and better public transit, that would be paid for through redistributive taxes. In the August primary, Scott came in second among ten candidates, receiving 23.26% of the vote, with former Clinton aide Alex Pedersen coming in first with 40.36%. Both advanced to the general election.

Scott and Pederson disagreed on most issues, with Scott opposing the removal of homeless encampments and supporting greater density in neighborhoods. He received endorsements from alternative weekly The Stranger and local chapters of the Sierra Club and Our Revolution. In the November general election, Pederson defeated Scott 52%-48%.

=== Washington House of Representatives ===
In 2024, after state representative Frank Chopp announced he would not run for reelection, Scott immediately announced his candidacy to represent Washington's 43rd Legislative District in the state legislature. During the August 2024 primary election, Scott finished with the most votes at 59.6%, advancing to the general election, with runner-up Andrea Suarez, founder of We Heart Seattle, earning 20.23% of the vote.

Scott and Suarez contrasted on nearly every issue, with Scott supporting rent stabilization, closing corporate loopholes, and creating progressive taxes. Scott handily defeated Suarez in the general election, winning 68.43% of the vote to Suarez' 30.81%.

== Filmography ==
Feature Films (as Director/Writer)

- Seat of Empire (2009)
- Waste of Time (2010)
- 100% OFF: A Recession-Era Romance (2012)
- Pacific Aggression (2014)

Short Films/Music Videos

- Shaun's Daydream (2008)
- Steppin' Into Tomorrow (2009)
- Driven (2013)
- An American Day (2014)
- Home Of The Mighty (2014)

== Bibliography ==
- Something Better: Millennials and Late Capitalism at the Movies (2015)
- Millennials and the Moments That Made Us: A Cultural History of the U.S. from 1982-Present (2018)
- Heartbreak City: Seattle Sports and the Unmet Promise of Urban Progress (2023)
