= Abel Pacheco Jr. =

American politician

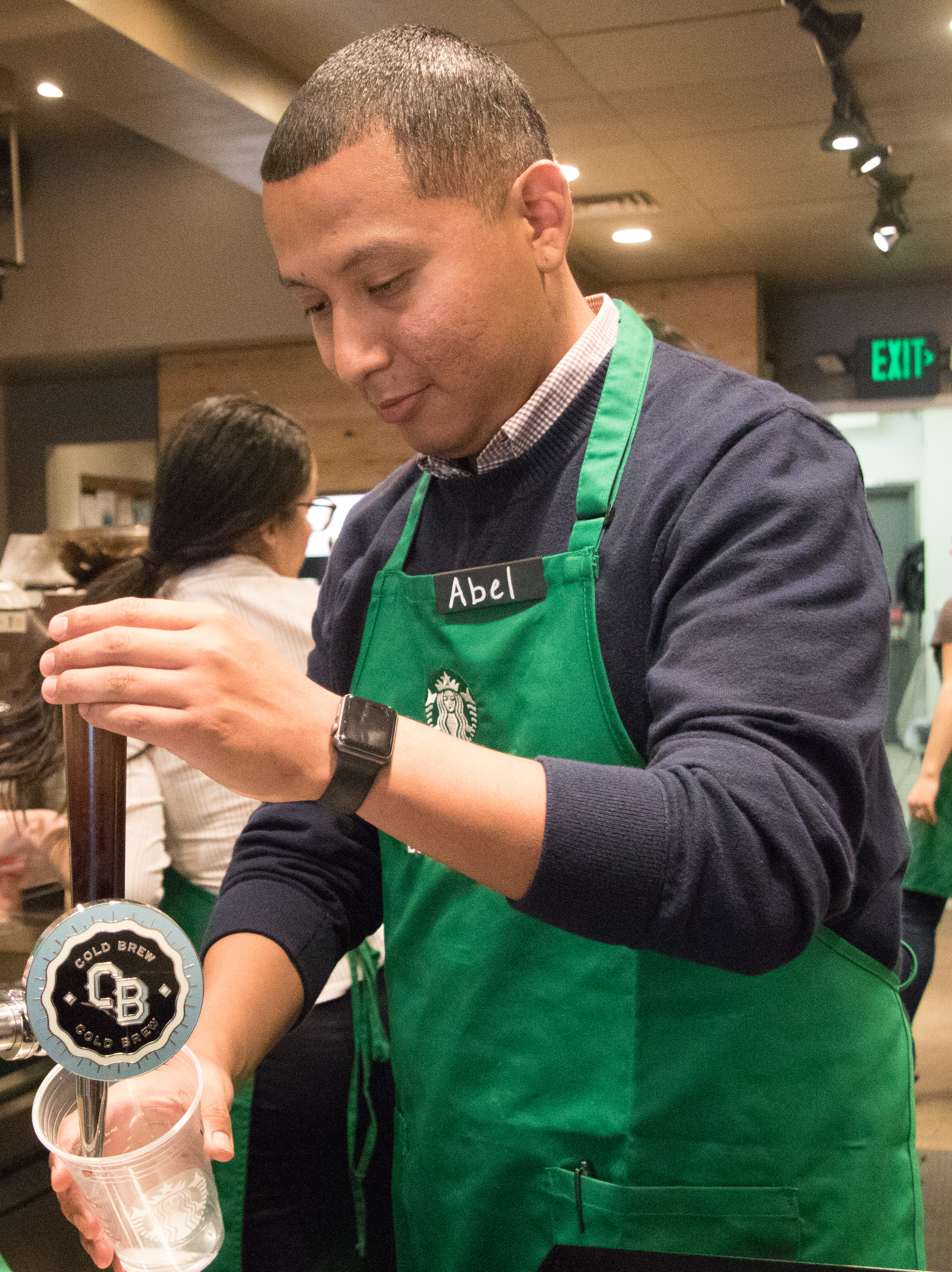
- Pacheco, October 2019

Member of the Seattle City Council from District 4
- In office April 22, 2019 – November 27, 2019
- Preceded by: Rob Johnson
- Succeeded by: Alex Pedersen

Personal details
- Born: Los Angeles, California
- Party: Democratic
- Education: California State University, Northridge (BA); University of Washington (MPA)

Abel Pacheco Jr. is an American politician from Seattle, Washington. He was appointed to the District 4 seat on the Seattle City Council in April 2017.

== Early life and education ==
Pacheco was raised by Mexican immigrant parents in Los Angeles, California. He earned his bachelor's degree in political science from California State University, Northridge before moving to Seattle. He has a Master of Public Affairs degree from the University of Washington.

Pacheco worked at the Seattle Foundation and the Seattle Police Foundation. He later worked at the University of Washington as the assistant director of the Office of Minority Affairs and Diversity and the STEM program director.

In 2015, Pacheco was wrongfully arrested for allegedly assaulting a cab driver after receiving a promotion at the University of Washington. The conviction was later expunged.

== Seattle City Council ==
=== Prior attempts ===
For the first time, seven city council seats were decided by geographic representation in the 2015 election. Pacheco ran in District 4 against incumbent Jean Godden. Pacheco came in fifth place in the August primary, receiving only 8.43% of the vote.

In 2017, Pacheco ran for the appointment to fill the seat of Tim Burgess, who had become acting mayor. The council appointed Kirsten Harris-Talley to fill the seat.

=== 2019 council appointment ===
In 2019, Pacheco ran for city council in District 4 after incumbent Rob Johnson (Seattle politician) stated he would not run for reelection. During the election, Pacheco accused rival and future District 4 councilmember Alex Pedersen of sending emails saying, "Abel is a criminal." Pederson denied the accusation.

In March 2019, Johnson announced that he would resign from the city council in April to work as a transportation adviser for Seattle's new NHL team. Pacheco was appointed to fill the position in a "caretaker" role, and stated that he would drop out of the District 4 race.

Pacheco was chair of the Planning, Land Use & Zoning Committee during his time in office focusing on urbanist issues. As chair, he introduced legislation that would reduce the amount of time for environmental review for projects related to housing and climate change. The legislation received some push-back from over concerns of environmental protection and reduction in civic engagement, but passed 8-0.

== Personal life ==
After leaving the city council, Pacheco then worked for Sound Transit. In June 2023, he joined the Washington State Army National Guard as a part-time intelligence analyst.
