= Alex Pedersen (politician) =

American politician (born 1969)

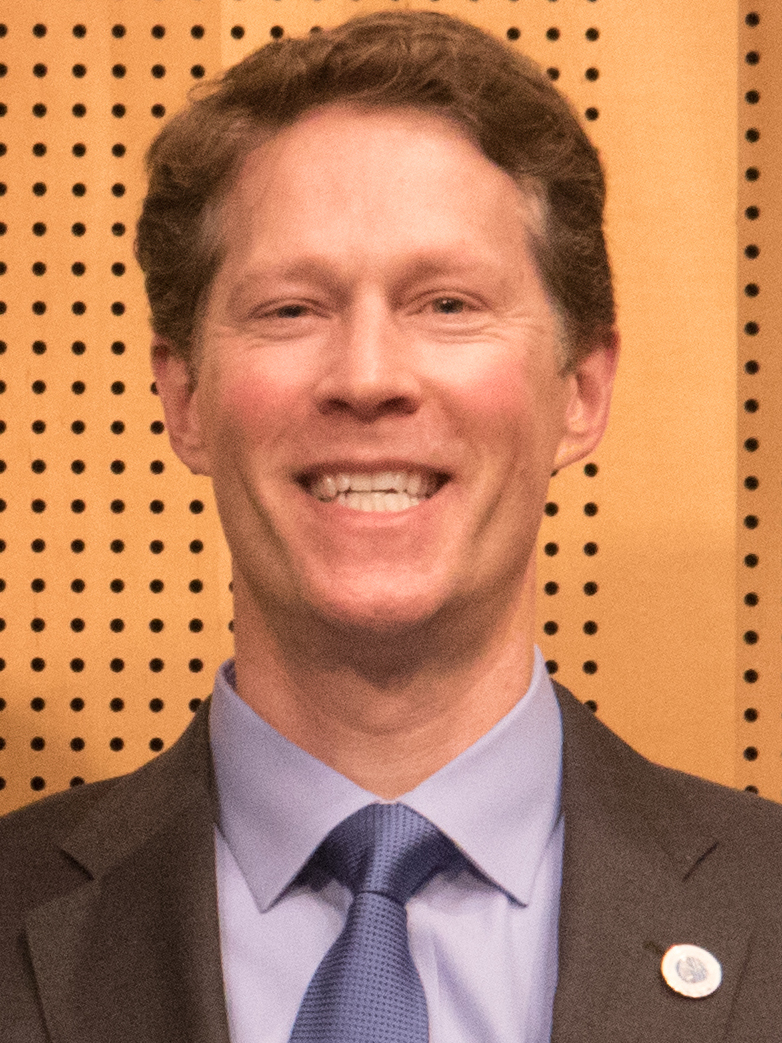
- Pedersen in 2020

Member of the Seattle City Council from District 4
- In office November 27, 2019 – December 31, 2023
- Preceded by: Abel Pacheco Jr.
- Succeeded by: Maritza Rivera

Personal details
- Born: July 17, 1969 (age 57) Baltimore, Maryland, United States
- Party: Democratic
- Children: 2
- Education: James Madison University (BA); University of Pennsylvania (MA)
- Profession: Financial analyst

Alex C. Pedersen (born 17 July 1969) is an American politician and former member of the Seattle City Council. He represented Seattle's District 4, which includes Wallingford, the University District, and Sand Point, from November 2019 until completing his term of office in December 2023. Previously, Pedersen was an aide to city councilmember Tim Burgess and a private sector housing finance analyst.

== Early life and education ==
Pedersen was born and raised in Baltimore, Maryland. After earning a Bachelor of Arts degree in history from James Madison University, Pedersen graduated from the University of Pennsylvania with a master's degree in government administration.

== Early career ==
He joined the Presidential Management Fellows Program during the Clinton administration. He worked on homelessness and community development programs for the U.S. Department of Housing and Urban Development under Secretary Andrew Cuomo. Pedersen was an aide to the Oakland City Council and a housing finance analyst for Bank of America and Alliant Capital before joining Seattle politics.

From 2012 to 2014, Pedersen was a legislative aide to Seattle City Council President Tim Burgess, who later ran for mayor. As legislative aide, Pedersen co-authored Resolution 31478, which initiated the city government’s goal of universal, high-quality preschool and a plan to achieve that goal. This culminated in Proposition 1B, which was approved by Seattle voters in November 2014. He also wrote a neighborhood newsletter focusing on Northeast Seattle affairs called "4 to Explore" that he ended when he started his campaign. Pedersen left his position in Burgess's office to join real estate firm CBRE as an affordable housing financial analyst.

== Seattle City Council ==
=== 2019 election ===
After declining to run for the newly created District 4 in the 2015 election, Pedersen announced his candidacy in November 2018. District 4 was named the key swing district in the city council race after the resignation of incumbent Rob Johnson, and Pedersen's competition characterized him as a conservative candidate among the primary field. He opposed the Move Seattle and Sound Transit 3 transportation referendums as well as the construction of bicycle lanes on 35th Avenue Northeast in District 4.

Pedersen won 40 percent of the vote in the primary and advanced to the general election alongside Shaun Scott, a Democratic Socialist writer and organizer. The two candidates took opposing sides in issues presented as debates, with Pedersen favoring the removal of homeless camps and reconsideration of the city's plans for neighborhood upzoning. His campaign received financial support from the Seattle Metropolitan Chamber of Commerce's political action committee and an endorsement from The Seattle Times.

Pedersen won the election with 52 percent of the vote and was sworn in on November 26, 2019, replacing interim member Abel Pacheco Jr. His victory was credited to strong support in wealthier neighborhoods at the east edge of the district, while Scott earned more votes in the University District and Roosevelt. Pedersen was appointed chair of the council's Transportation and Utilities Committee, which was the subject of criticism from transportation advocacy groups based on his comments on previous referendums.

=== Tenure ===
Pedersen identifies as a progressive Democrat, although he has also been described as a "pro-business moderate."

In his first year as chair of the Transportation Committee, Pedersen initiated an audit of Seattle's bridges. The audit reported in September 2020 that bridge conditions had worsened over the previous decade, and recommended addressing the city's bridge maintenance funding shortfall.

Pedersen also sponsored Ordinance 126115, which was approved by nearly 82% of voters as City of Seattle Proposition No. 1 in November 2020 to renew the Seattle Transportation Benefit District.

Pedersen was the lead sponsor of Resolution 31956, passed in July 2020. The resolution established the City Council's goal of implementing Internet for All Seattle, which would expand reliable and affordable broadband access for Seattle residents. This required Seattle's Information Technology Department to develop an action plan.

Pedersen sponsored Resolution 31933 that passed in September 2020 to require consideration of carbon emissions and climate change impact in all new legislation. He credited the idea to Cathy Tuttle, an opponent during their 2019 election campaign.

Pedersen opposed the pledge made by other officials during 2020 to reduce the Seattle Police Department budget by 50 percent.

To address homelessness in his Council District, Pedersen sponsored legislation to authorize and fund Rosie's Tiny House Village in 2020. In 2023, he sponsored legislation to enable the project site to become a permanent affordable housing development.

Pedersen co-sponsored an amendment to Seattle's comprehensive plan in May 2023 that would have imposed "impact fees" on new housing to fund transportation projects. Other councilmembers had proposed similar plans to create impact fees on new development as early as 2014. Pedersen said the fees could allow the city to offset the property taxes used for the Seattle Transportation Levy.

In January 2023, Pedersen announced that he would not seek re-election to a second term. The Seattle Times described his first-term voting record as "consistently more centrist than his more left-leaning peers".

== Personal life ==
Pedersen lives in the Ravenna neighborhood of Northeast Seattle with his wife and two children.
