= Judy Nicastro =

American politician

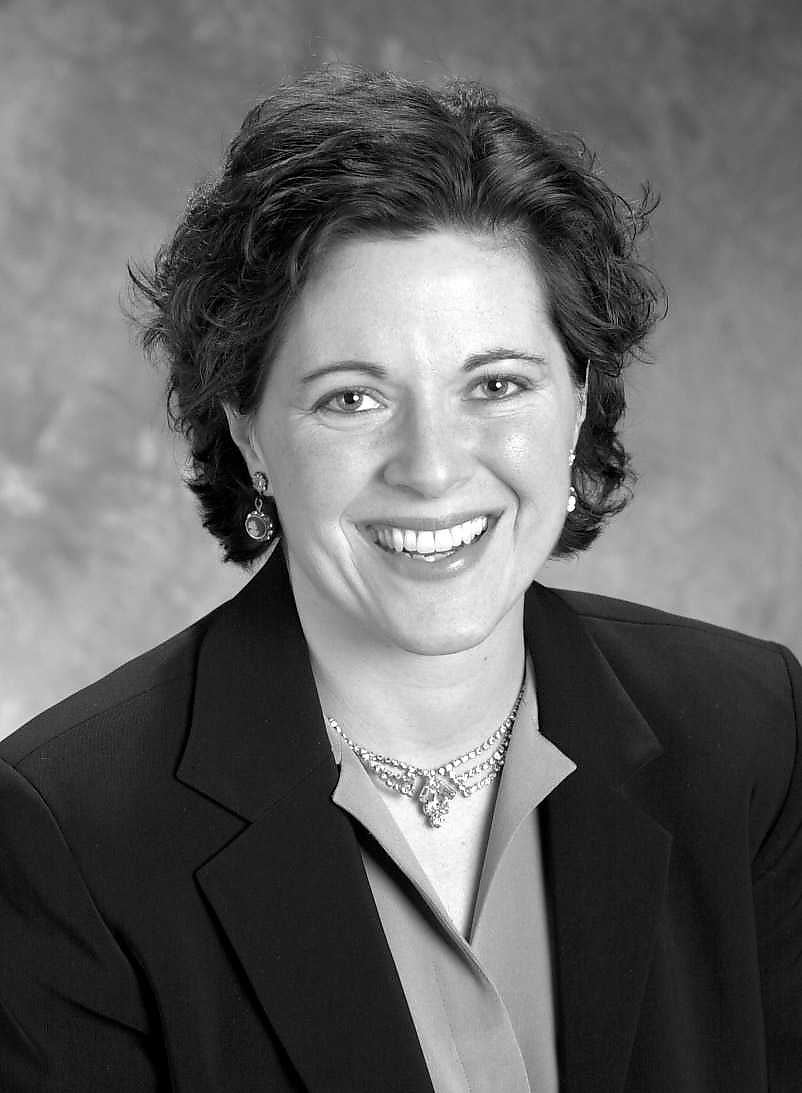

Member of the Seattle City Council from Position 1
- In office January 10, 2000 – January 5, 2004
- Preceded by: Sue Donaldson
- Succeeded by: Jean Godden

Personal details
- Born: New Jersey
- Party: Democratic
- Spouse: Peter Mansour
- Education: University of Washington (BA, JD)

Judy Nicastro is an American former politician who served from 2000 to 2004 as a Seattle City Council member in Position 1.

== Early life and education ==
Nicastro was born in New Jersey to working-class parents. Living in Saddle River, New Jersey, Nicastro experienced the importance of political power when she and her mother suffered from funding cuts to widows' benefits when President Reagan signed the 1981 budget; her mother had been unsuccessful in lobbying their representatives in Congress to oppose the elimination of the program. She stated, "They took money away from us. I realized then the power of politics. It matters." This experience helped shape her populist agenda as a city council member.

She lived in New York City and attended the Fashion Institute of Technology, later working at Lord & Taylor. At the age of 22, she moved to Washington State in 1988, where she went to the University of Washington to earn her bachelor and Juris Doctor degrees. She would later work for Boeing before running for city council.

== Seattle City Council ==
=== 1999 Seattle City Council election ===
In 1999, Nicastro ran for city council after council member Sue Donaldson decided not to run for office. Ran as an outraged, "pissed off renter" with her campaign centering around a pro-tenant agenda that included rental reforms and greater housing options. She was labeled a "Pragmatic Populist," advocating for a repeal of the state's rent control restrictions, stating at the time, "I don’t know whether or not rent control and overall rent regulation would work for Seattle. But I think we have a right to have that discussion...at a minimum, the law should be repealed..."

Nicastro ran against former city councilmember Cheryl Chow after her failed 1997 mayoral run. Nicastro and Chow got first and second place in the August primary, respectively.

Chow outraised Nicastro by over $12,000 due to support from landlords and other business leaders. Chow and her supporters labeled Nicastro as a "radical leftist," and Nicastro and her supporters labeled Chow "mediocre."

In the November General Election, Nicastro narrowly defeated Chow, 50.49% to 49.51%.

=== Seattle City Council (1999–2003) ===
While in office, Nicastro chaired the Landlord/Tenant & Land Use Committee, where she sponsored bills to strengthen tenant rights, lower parking requirements for affordable housing units, and increase density around transit hubs.

She would be the lone vote on various bills, including a 2001 bill to sell off land in South Lake Union due to a lack of affordable housing guarantees and the 2002 Affordable Housing levy because the levy focused on homeownership.

=== Strippergate Scandal ===
Former Washington state governor Albert Rosellini assisted the Colacurcios family by lobbying six members of the Seattle City Council and raising funds for three of the politicians. In June 2003, James Bush, a reporter for the North Seattle Sun, reported city council members Judy Nicastro, Jim Compton and Heidi Wills received large amounts of campaign donations from the Colacurcio family and their business associates. On June 16, 2003, in a 5–4 vote, the council approved the parking zoning changes allowing them to use their existing land for parking requested by the Colacurcios. Nicastro, Compton, and Wills would all vote in favor on the expansion.

The Seattle Ethics and Elections Commission investigated "Strippergate" and determined that Nicastro received $22,000 in campaign contributions from the Colacurcio family. All of the council members later returned the contributions.

=== 2003 City Council elections ===
Nicastro ran for reelection in 2003 with six challengers in the open primary. Nicastro won the September primary with 25.61% of the vote, and Seattle Times columnist Jean Godden narrowly came in second with 17.65%.

Mayor Greg Nickels would endorse Godden in the November general election, a rare move for a Seattle mayor. Nicastro claimed the endorsement was due to a letter she sent to Nickels accusing him of lying, threatening her, and stealing her ideas.

Partially weighted down by the Strippergate Scandal, Nicastro lost reelection to Godden, 48% to 52%.

== Personal life ==
Nicastro and her husband have two children together. In June 2013, after House Republicans passed a bill that would restrict abortions after 22 weeks, Nicastro released an op-ed talking about her struggle conceiving through IVF and her abortion at 22 weeks after complications carrying twins.

== Electoral history ==
Seattle City Council Position 1, primary election 1999
Party	Candidate	Votes	%
Nonpartisan	Cheryl Chow	29,497	38.76%
Nonpartisan	Judy Nicastro	26,592	34.95%
Nonpartisan	Daniel Norton	13,019	17.11%
Nonpartisan	Bob Hegamin	6,984	9.18%
Turnout		76,092	

Seattle City Council Position 1, general election 1999
Party	Candidate	Votes	%
Nonpartisan	Judy Nicastro	79,662	50.49%
Nonpartisan	Cheryl Chow	78,111	49.51%
Turnout		157,773	

Seattle City Council Position 1, primary election 2003
Party	Candidate	Votes	%
Nonpartisan	Judy Nicastro	28,958	25.16%
Nonpartisan	Jean Godden	20,317	17.65%
Nonpartisan	Robert Rosencrantz	20,142	17.50%
Nonpartisan	Kollin K Min	19,477	16.92%
Nonpartisan	Darryl Smith	13,607	11.82%
Nonpartisan	Art Skolnik	8,049	6.99%
Nonpartisan	David Ferguson	4,567	3.97%
Turnout		115,117	

Seattle City Council Position 1, general election 2003
Party	Candidate	Votes	%
Nonpartisan	Jean Godden	63,867	52.52%
Nonpartisan	Judy Nicastro	58,353	47.74%
Turnout		122,220	
