= Margaret Pageler =

American politician (born 1940)

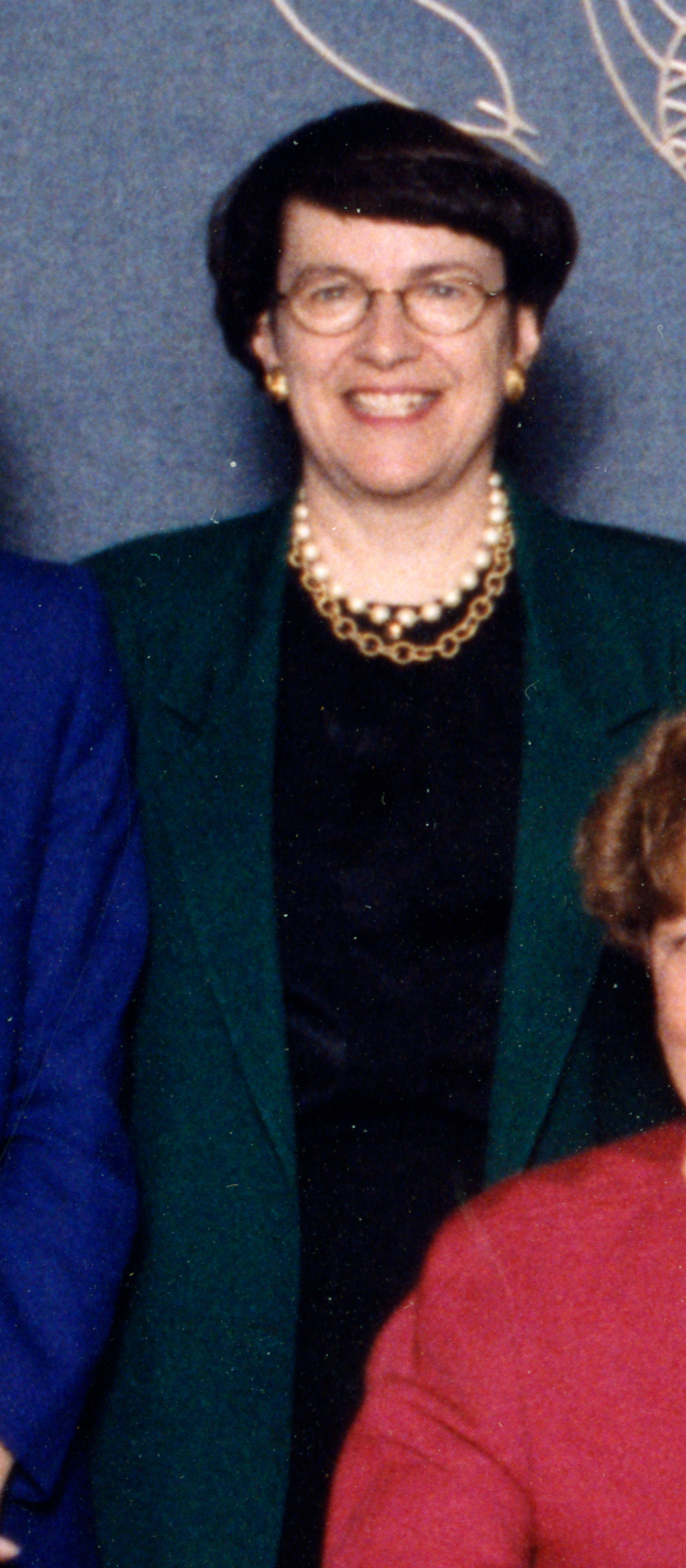
- Margaret Pageler, 1997

President of the Seattle City Council
- In office January 3, 2000 – January 3, 2002
- Preceded by: Sue Donaldson
- Succeeded by: Peter Steinbrueck

Member of the Seattle City Council for Position 5
- In office January 3, 1992 – January 5, 2004
- Preceded by: Paul Kraabel
- Succeeded by: Tom Rasmussen

Personal details
- Born: November 16, 1940 (age 85) Honan, China
- Education: Wheaton College (BA); Northern Illinois University (MA); University of Chicago (JD)

Margaret Pageler is a former Seattle City Council member in Position 5 from 1992 until 2004.

== Early life and education ==
Pageler was born in rural China to missionary parents. She stayed in China and Taiwan until her teens.

Pageler would attend multiple schools in Illinois for college; Wheaton College for her bachelor's degree in Social Studies, Northern Illinois University for her master's in school administration, and the University of Chicago Law School.

Pageler was a former schoolteacher, and after law school, she worked at the law firm Stoel Rives.

== Seattle City Council ==
=== Elections ===
Pageler unsuccessfully ran for city council three times in the 1980s under the progressive neighborhood group Vision Seattle. In 1991, she ran for city council to fill the seat vacated by Paul Kraabel, who was retiring. In the general election, Pageler would win with 57% of the vote to opponent, R.P. (Dick) Nelson, 43%.

In 1995, Pageler ran for reelection against perennial candidate Charlie Chong. Pageler would win in a landslide against Chong, 69% to 31%.

In 1999, Pageler ran for a third term against three challengers. In the September Primary, she won an outright majority with 58% of the vote, and her nearest challenger, Curt Firestone, received 23% of the vote. Firestone, co-founder of the Seattle Progressive Coalition and a leader of the Seattle Green Party, ran to the left of Pageler and accused her of moving away from the progressive values of her 1991 campaign. Pageler would tout her accomplishments on the city council and her ability to make things work. In the November general election, Pageler won reelection against Firestone, 67% to 33%.

In 2003, Pageler ran for a fourth term and would face five challengers. In the September primary, Pageler would garner 39% of the vote with Tom Rasmussen, an advocate for senior citizens, garnering 25%. Pageler ran as a "rock" and "voice of reason" stating, "I'm the one who opposes silly resolutions and stays out of all the scandals" (referring to the Strippergate Scandal). Rasmussen blamed Pageler for the financial crisis facing Seattle City Light since she oversaw the agency in city council. In the November general election, Pageler lost to Rasmussen, 48% to 52%.

=== Tenure ===
While in office, Pageler chaired the Public Safety Committee and the Utilities and Environmental Management Committee. From 2000 to 2001, Pageler was president of the city council.

While chair of the Utilities and Environmental Management Committee, Pageler oversaw Seattle City Light, and decisions made by Paegler, the council, and City Light increased the debt for City Light, contributing to a financial crisis that increased rates for customers. Auditors would blame the council's decisions not to increase rates during the 1990s while increasing City Lights debt financing.

Although she initially ran for city council as a progressive, Pageler governed more as a conservative. She supported bills such as the Teen Dance Ordinance, "civility" ordinances proposed by the city attorney, and propose legislation that would have created a "4-foot rule" around exotic dancers and customers.

=== Ethics complaint ===
In 1999, before the city council elections, Pageler was the voice of a City Light radio advertisement and the Director of the Seattle Ethics Elections Commission concluded that the ad may have inadvertently violated election laws. Pageler reimbursed the city $2,000 for the ad, and the Ethics and Elections Commission dismissed the complaint.
