= Sue Donaldson (politician) =

American politician

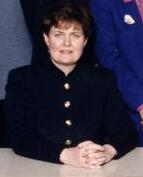

President of the Seattle City Council
- In office 1998–1999
- Preceded by: Jan Drago
- Succeeded by: Margaret Pageler

Member of the Seattle City Council from Position 1
- In office January 19, 1990 – January 10, 2000
- Preceded by: Norm Rice
- Succeeded by: Judy Nicastro

Personal details
- Party: Democratic
- Spouse: Paul Fletcher
- Education: Harvard University (BA); University of Washington (JD)

Sue Donaldson was a member of the Seattle City Council from 1990 to 2000 and served as council president from 1998 to 1999.

== Seattle city council ==
=== Appointment and elections ===
Donaldson was appointed to the council on January 19, 1990, to fill the first of two years of Norm Rice's remaining term, after he was elected Mayor of Seattle. She would run in the 1990 special election with David Moseley, a political adviser and community activist, her primary opponent. In the November general election, Donaldson defeated Mosely in a landslide, 73% to 27%.

In 1991, Donaldson ran for reelection with three challengers, with Freedom Socialist Party member Yolanda Alaniz moving past the September primary. In the November general election, Donaldson again won in a landslide earning 82% of the vote.

Donaldson faced two challengers during her 1995 reelection bid, and she advanced through the primary with University of Puget Sound professor Jordan Brower. Brower sued the city of Seattle in October 1995 for allegedly misusing federal housing money for the new Nordstrom flagship store, which Donaldson voted in favor of. In the general election, Donaldson would win in another landslide, 77% to 23%.'

=== Tenure ===
Over her tenure, Donaldson chaired the Land Use Committee and Public Grounds and Recreation Committees. She was considered "establishment" and voted for legislation that favored downtown businesses, including Nordstrom's, and voted for socially conservative legislation, such as the drug loitering ordinance.

Donaldson was council president from 1998 to 1999. As president, she lobbied the United States Department of State to host the World Trade Organization Ministerial Conference of 1999. During the conference, people protested the event, which led to rioting through downtown Seattle, sometimes referred to as the Battle of Seattle. In her final month in office, Donaldson oversaw the response to the riot and the investigation into the city's failed response. Police chief Norm Stamper resigned after the riots, which Donaldson opposed and placed blame on Mayor Paul Schell saying, "It is unfortunate that the mayor has taken this action at this time."

In 1999, Donaldson announced that she would not seek reelection.

== Post-council ==
After serving on the council, Donaldson worked at the Evans School of Public Policy and Governance and University of Washington. She also hosted an interview radio show called "The Bridge" with fellow former city councilmember Jean Godden, which is on hiatus due to the pandemic.

== Personal life ==
Donaldson is a graduate of Harvard University and earned her Juris Doctor from the University of Washington. Before running for city council, she was a property lawyer for Perkins Cole.

Donaldson is married to Dr. Paul Fletcher, and they have three daughters.
