= Tom Rasmussen =

American politician

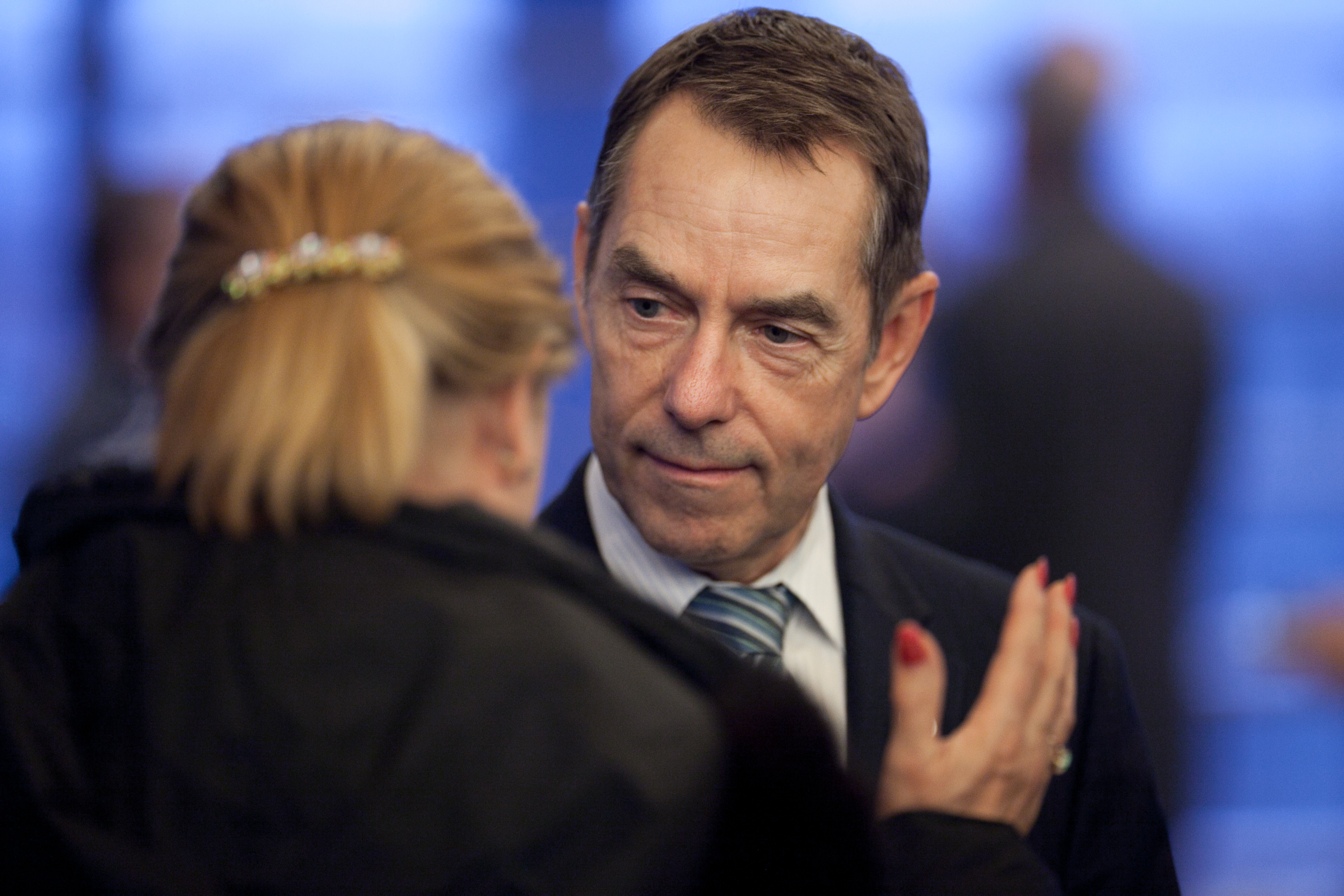
- Tom Rasmussen, 2012

Member of the Seattle City Council for Position 5
- In office January 1, 2004 – December 31, 2015
- Preceded by: Margaret Pageler
- Succeeded by: Constituency abolished

Personal details
- Domestic partner: Clayton Lewis
- Education: Pacific Lutheran University (BA); Valparaiso University (JD)

Thomas M. Rasmussen is a retired member of the Seattle City Council, serving from 2004 to 2015.

== Education and early career ==
Rasmussen holds a bachelor's degree in political science from Pacific Lutheran University and a J.D. from Valparaiso University. After graduating, he worked at the Yakima County Prosecuting Attorney's Office for three years. From 1976 to 1988, Rasmussen was a legislative aide to Seattle councilmember Jeanette Williams, working on transportation and parks projects, including construction of a new West Seattle bridge and the city's purchase of the Kubota Gardens.

After Williams' election defeat in 1989, Rasmussen became a top manager at the nonprofit Senior Services of Seattle/King County. In 1999, Mayor Paul Schell hired him as director of the office of senior citizens, serving until his 2003 election win. Before running for city council, Rasmussen also chaired the parks committee of the Queen Anne Community Council.

== Seattle City Council ==
=== Elections ===
In 2003, Rasmussen ran against incumbent Margaret Pageler, citing the council's lack of focus on local issues as the reason for his candidacy. In the September open primary, Pageler came in first against her five challenges, with 39% of the vote, with Rasmussen coming in second with 25%. Rasmussen criticized Pageler's application to the become president of the Seattle Chamber of Commerce the prior year and for the financial crisis that Seattle City Light was facing. In the November general election, Rasmussen defeated Pageler, 52% to 48%.

Rasmussen ran for reelection in 2007 unopposed. In his 2011 reelection bid, Rasmussen had only one challenger, Dale Pusey, which he defeated in a landslide in the general election with 72% of the vote.

=== Tenure ===
From 2004 to 2007, he was chair of the Housing, Human Services & Health Committee and vice chair of the Urban Development & Planning Committee. From 2008 to 2009, he was chair of the Parks & Seattle Center Committee, the vice chair of the Culture, Civil Rights, Health and Personnel Committee, and the Labor Policy Committee.

Rasmussen chaired the Transportation Committee for his final six years in office. As chair, he championed the "big dig" tunnel replacement for the Alaskan Way Viaduct replacement. Rasmussen also supported Proposition 1, a levy that gave new funding to Seattle transportation projects, and pushed for expanded bus services from those funds. In his final year in office, he pushed for expanded bus service, using Prop 1 funds, and a new tax levy, "Bridging the Gap II."

In 2015, Rasmussen announced he would not seek reelection, choosing not to run for the newly created District 1 seat.

== Personal life ==
Rasmussen is gay and is active in LGBT legal and political organizations, including as a board member of the Lambda Legal Defense Fund. He lives in West Seattle with his partner Clayton Lewis.
