= Nicole Macri =

American politician

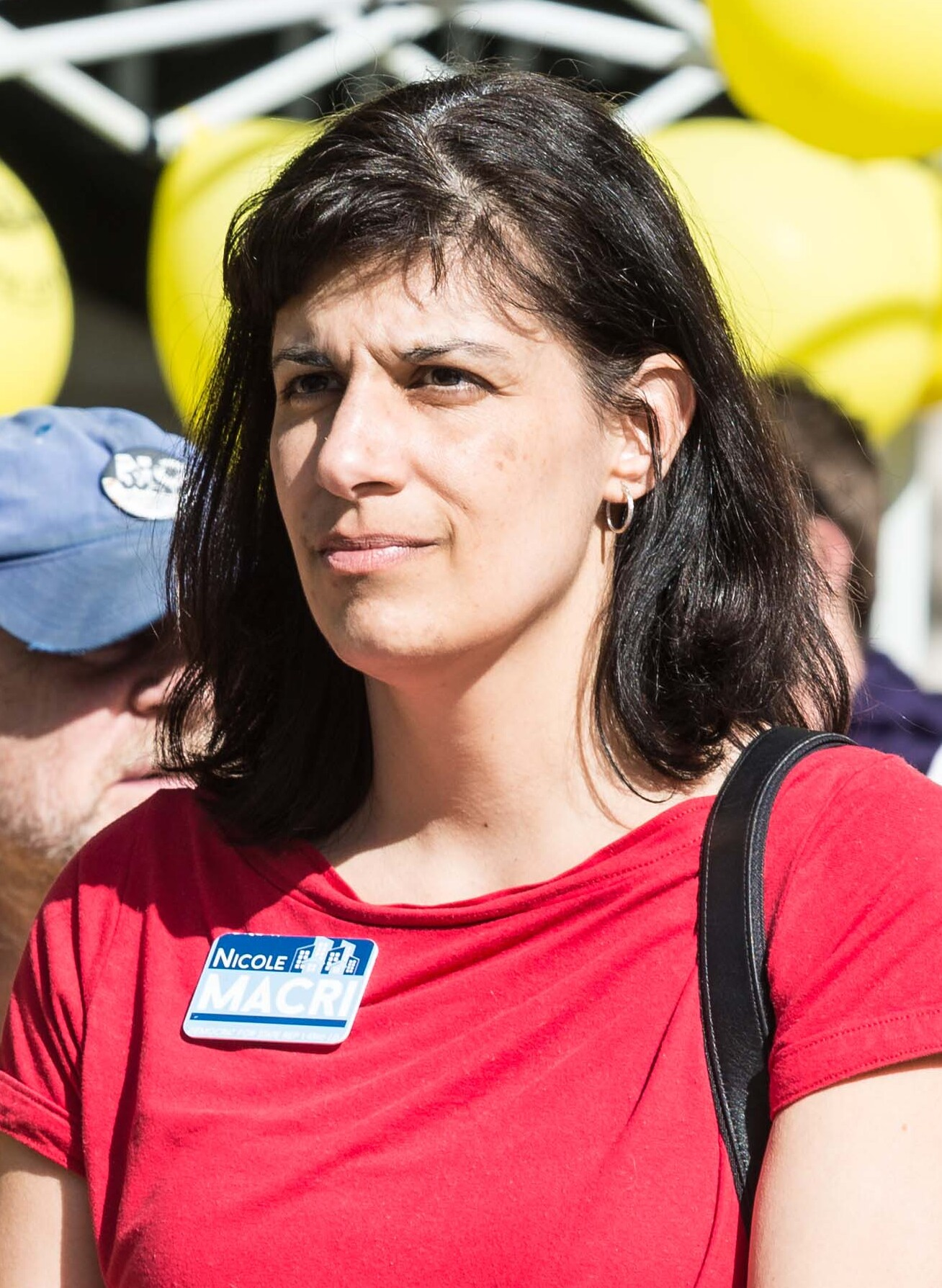
- Macri in 2016

Member of the Washington House of Representatives from the 43rd district
- Incumbent
- Assumed office January 9, 2017 Serving with Shaun Scott
- Preceded by: Brady Walkinshaw

Personal details
- Born: 1973 (age 52–53) New York, New York, U.S.
- Party: Democratic
- Spouse: Deb Cayz
- Education: Rutgers University (BA); University of Washington (MPA)
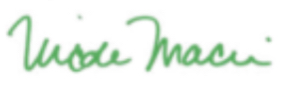
- Signature

Nicole Macri (born 1973) is an American politician, who was elected to the Washington House of Representatives in the 2016 elections. A member of the Democratic Party, she represents the 43rd district.

Prior to her election to the legislature, Macri served as deputy director of Seattle's Downtown Emergency Service Center.
