= Jean Godden =

American politician (born 1931)

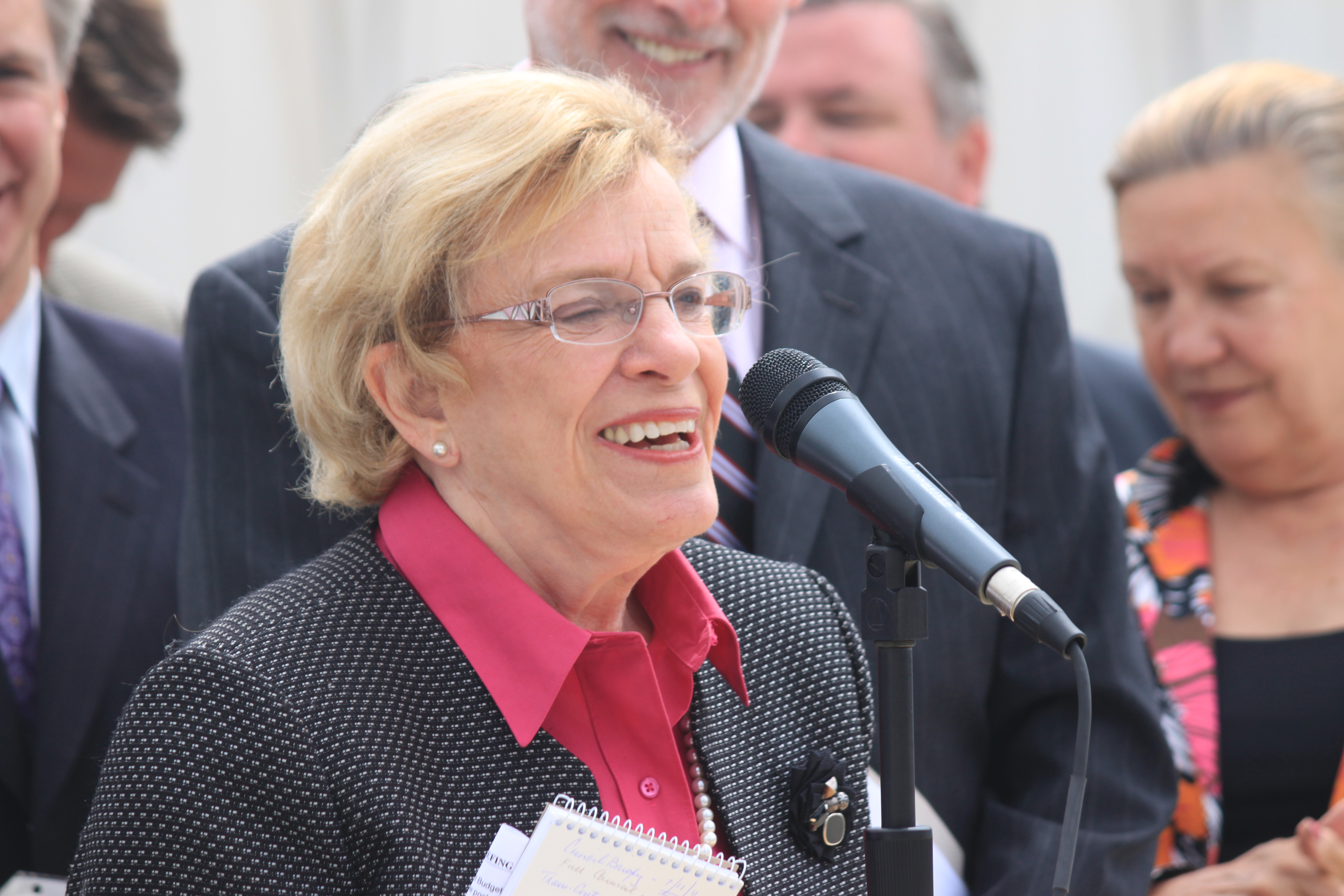
- Jean Godden, 2011

Member of the Seattle City Council for Position 1
- In office January 5, 2004 – January 4, 2016
- Preceded by: Judy Nicastro
- Succeeded by: Rob Johnson

Personal details
- Born: October 1, 1931 (age 94) Stamford, Connecticut
- Party: Democratic
- Children: Jeff and Glenn (sons)
- Education: University of Washington (BA)
- Occupation: Seattle City Councilmember (Position 1)

Jean H. Godden (born October 10, 1931) is a former member of the Seattle City Council. She served from 2004 to 2016. Before running for city council, she was a columnist for the Seattle Post-Intelligencer and The Seattle Times newspapers.

== Early life and education ==
Godden was born in Stamford, Connecticut, on October 1, 1931. Godden's family moved many times due to her father's job as a surveyor, before settling in Seattle when she was 17.

After two Seattle school levies failed and her son's kindergarten class disappeared, Godden and other parents mobilized, and she became PTA president. Godden then joined the League of Women Voters, Citizens Against Freeways, the Municipal League, and the United Way, where she helped to organize the Lake City Community Council, wrote its bylaws and served as one of its first directors.

In 1969, Seattle Mayor Wes Uhlman appointed Godden to his charter review committee and the City's Board of Adjustment.

Godden received her bachelor's degree in editorial journalism from the University of Washington in 1973 and was elected a member of Phi Beta Kappa.

== Journalism career ==
Godden attained celebrity status in Seattle as a columnist for both daily newspapers, first for the Seattle Post-Intelligencer and most recently for The Seattle Times. Godden reached that status after years of working in other positions with the paper, including as a business editor, editorial page editor, real estate and urban affairs reporter, and restaurant critic. Godden attended Northwestern University's Medill School of Journalism before eventually graduating from the University of Washington's School of Communications. She started her newspaper career at the University District Herald as a 19-year-old, joined the P-I in 1974 as a temporary staffer, had her first column published in the P-I in 1983, and finally switched to The Seattle Times in 1991.

== Seattle City Council ==
=== 2003 election ===
Godden announced she would run for Seattle City Council, running against incumbent Judy Nicastro, along with five other challengers. In the September primary, Nicastro came in first with 25.16% of the vote, and after a recount, Godden came in second with 17.65%.

In the general election, Seattle Mayor Greg Nickels endorsed Godden, a rare move for a Seattle mayor. Partially weighted down by the Strippergate scandal, Nicastro would lose reelection to Godden, 48% to 52%.

=== 2007 campaign ===
Godden faced opposition from three challengers in the August primary: Joe Szwaja, Lauren Briel, and Robert Sondheim. She significantly out-fundraised all of her opponents. According to Seattle Ethics and Elections reports, Godden had raised $189,189 as of August 27. Her closest challenger, Szwaja, had raised just over $56,000; as of September 28, 2007, Godden had generated $200,375 in campaign funding.

In the August 21 primary, Godden advanced to the general election, beating Szwaja by more than 30 percentage points. In the general election, Godden won in a landslide against Szwaja, 71% to 29%. After the election, Godden would pay a $150 fine to the Seattle Ethics and Elections Commission for using city resources to schedule campaign events.

=== 2011 election ===
In August 2011, during the primary, Godden came in first against her three challengers, with 43% of the vote. Bobby Forch, a project manager for Seattle Department of Transportation, came in second with 26% of the vote. Godden would narrowly win the November General Election against Forch, 50.6% to 49.4%.

=== 2015 election ===
In the election of 2015, for the first time, seven of the city council seats were decided by geographic representation. Godden was opposed in her race for the newly created District 4 seat by opponents Rob Johnson, a transit advocate, and Michael Maddux, a parks activist. Godden conceded on August 6 after coming in third place, and Rob Johnson was eventually elected to the seat.

=== Tenure ===
She chaired the Libraries, Utilities, and Center Committee and the Central Waterfront, Seawall, and Alaskan Way Viaduct Replacement Program Committee. She was also Vice Chair of the Parks and Neighborhood Committee and a member of the Transportation Committee. Jean also was an alternate on the Parks and Seattle Center Committee.

As chair of the Central Waterfront, Seawall, and Alaskan Way Viaduct Replacement Program Committee, Godden supported the demolition and replacement of the Alaskan Way Viaduct, stating that the waterfront would "...be active and vibrant, populated with parks, restaurants, and cultural amenities." In an op-ed, Godden would state that the State Route 99 tunnel that would replace the viaduct would not go over budget like Mayor Michael McGinn said it would. The tunnel project was originally budgeted for $3.1 billion, but would go over budget by $223 million.

As chair of the Utilities Committee, she passed legislation to cut rates for senior and low-income customers and increased taxes on Seattle City Light to get its debt under control without cutting services.

== Personal life ==
After leaving city council, Godden continued to write articles, contributing to sites such as Westside Seattle and PostAlley.com. She also hosted an interview radio show called "The Bridge" with fellow former city councilmember Sue Donaldson, which is on hiatus due to the pandemic.

Godden has two sons, Glenn and Jeff, and two grandsons, Chris Godden and Matthew Godden, and one great-grandson and three great-granddaughters, Joshua Godden, Raevyn Godden, Calla Godden, and Sloane Godden. She resides in Seattle's View Ridge neighborhood.

=== Electoral history ===
2003 Seattle City Council, Pos. 1 Primary election
Party	Candidate	Votes	%	±%
Nonpartisan	Judy Nicastro (Incumbent)	28,958	25.16%	
Nonpartisan	Jean Godden	20,317	17.65%	
Nonpartisan	Robert Rosencrantz	20,142	17.50%	
Nonpartisan	Darryl Smith	13,607	11.82%	
Nonpartisan	Art Skolnik	8,049	6.99%	
Nonpartisan	David Ferguson	4,567	3.97%	

2003 Seattle City Council, Pos. 1 General election
Party	Candidate	Votes	%	±%
Nonpartisan	Judy Nicastro(Incumbent)	58,353	47.74%	
Nonpartisan	Jean Godden	63,867	52.25%	

2007 Seattle City Council, Pos. 1 Primary election
Party	Candidate	Votes	%	±%
Nonpartisan	Jean Godden (Incumbent)	37,658	51.96%	
Nonpartisan	Joe Szwaja	15,781	21.78%	
Nonpartisan	Lauren Briel	9,695	13.38%	
Nonpartisan	Robert Sondheim	9,058	12.50%	

2007 Seattle City Council, Pos. 1 General election
Party	Candidate	Votes	%	±%
Nonpartisan	Jean Godden (Incumbent)	96,530	71.49%	
Nonpartisan	Joe Szwaja	38,479	28.5%	

2011 Seattle City Council, Pos. 1 Primary election
Party	Candidate	Votes	%	±%
Nonpartisan	Jean Godden (Incumbent)	53,216	43.34%	
Nonpartisan	Bobby Forch	32,027	26.08%	
Nonpartisan	Maurice Classen	21,188	17.25%	
Nonpartisan	Michael Taylor-Judd	15,599	12.70%	
Nonpartisan	Write-In	765	0.62%	

2011 Seattle City Council, Pos. 1 General election
Party	Candidate	Votes	%	±%
Nonpartisan	Jean Godden (Incumbent)	84,124	50.62%	
Nonpartisan	Bobby Forch	82,060	49.37%	

2015 Seattle City Council, District 4 Primary election
Party	Candidate	Votes	%	±%
Nonpartisan	Rob Johnson	5,516	32.84%	
Nonpartisan	Michael Maddux	4,138	24.64%	
Nonpartisan	Jean Godden (Incumbent)	3,307	19.69%	
Nonpartisan	Tony Provine	2,372	14.12%	
Nonpartisan	Abel Pacheco	1,416	8.43%	
Nonpartisan	Write-In	46	0.27%	
