= Seattle City Council =

Legislative body of the city of Seattle, Washington

- City Council

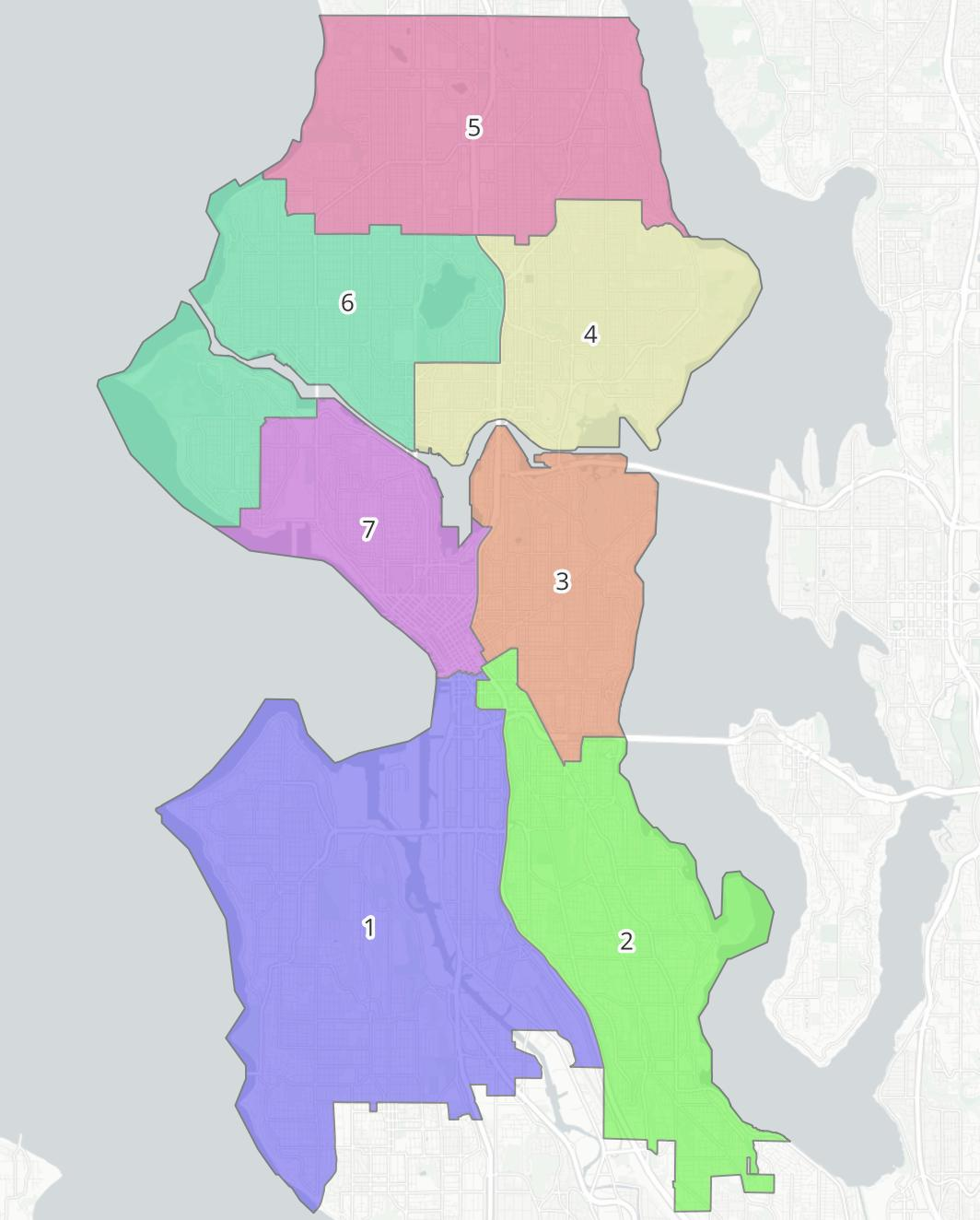
- Map of the seven districts after 2022 redistricting

Type
- Type: City Council of City of Seattle
- Houses: Unicameral

Leadership
- President of the Council: Joy Hollingsworth (D)

Structure
- Seats: 9
- Political groups: Democratic (9)
- Committees: List: Finance, Native Communities, & Tribal Governments Housing, Arts, & Civil Rights Human Services, Labor, & Economic Development Land Use & Sustainability Libraries, Education, & Neighborhoods Parks & City Light Governance & Utilities Public Safety Transportation, Waterfront, & Seattle Center Families, Education, Preschool & Promise (FEPP) Levy (select) Federal Administration & Policy Changes (select) Comprehensive Plan (select) Budget (select)
- Length of term: 4 years

Elections
- Voting system: First-past-the-post with a Nonpartisan blanket primary
- Last election: November 4, 2025

Meeting place
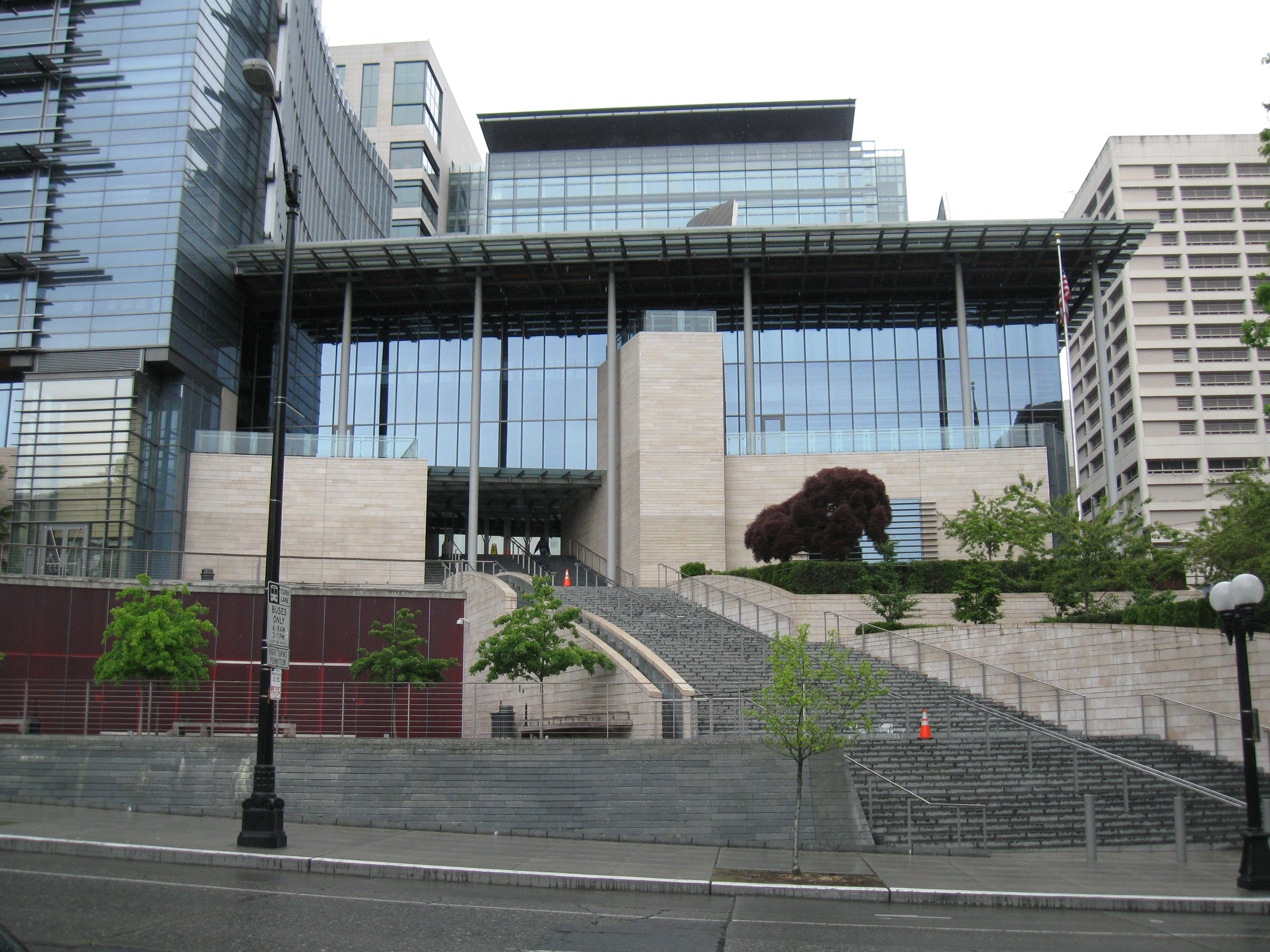
- Seattle City Hall; 600 Fourth Avenue, Second floor Seattle, Washington 98104

Website
- http://www.seattle.gov/council/

Constitution
- Charter

The Seattle City Council is the legislative body of the city of Seattle, Washington. The Council consists of nine members serving four-year terms, seven of which are elected by electoral districts and two of which are elected in citywide at-large positions; all elections are non-partisan. It has the responsibility of approving the city's budget, and passes all legislation related to the city's police, firefighting, parks, libraries, and electricity, water supply, solid waste, and drainage utilities. The mayor of Seattle is not part of the council.

== Members ==
Last election: November 2025

District	Member	Party preference	First elected
1	Rob Saka	Democratic	2023
2	Eddie Lin	Democratic	2025 (Note: Eddie Lin won the special election to fill the remainder of Tammy Morales term after her resignation.)
3	Joy Hollingsworth	Democratic	2023
4	Maritza Rivera	Democratic	2023
5	Debora Juarez	Democratic	2025 (Note: Debora Juarez was appointed to the seat after Cathy Moore resigned, citing health and personal issues.)
6	Dan Strauss	Democratic	2019
7	Robert Kettle	Democratic	2023
8 (at-large)	Alexis Mercedes Rinck	Democratic	2024
9 (at-large)	Dionne Foster	Democratic	2025

== Elections ==
Election of city council members occur on odd-numbered years, with at-large seats staggered from district seats. City council members' terms begin January 1 although public ceremonies are held on the following Monday. The council positions are officially non-partisan and the ballot gives no party designations. Party identification is based on candidates' voluntary self-identification. Like other elections in Washington, all candidates run together in the primary with the top two progressing to the general election. Beginning in 2027, Seattle will begin to use ranked-choice voting to determine the top two candidates from the primary who will compete in the general election.

Candidates may participate in Seattle's unique democracy voucher program, which provides residents with vouchers to give candidates for public campaign funding.

== Districts ==
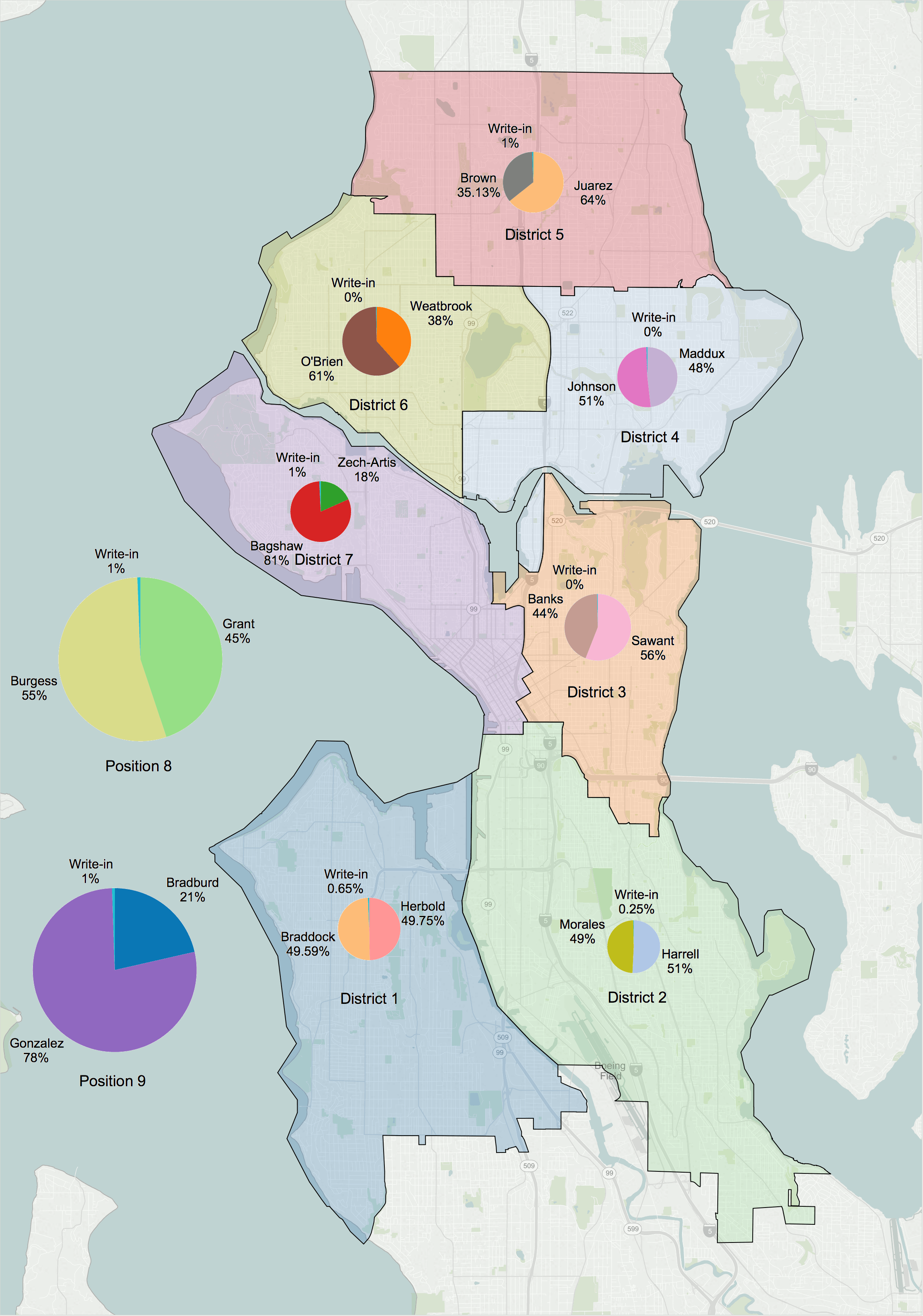
Results of the 2015 City Council election. Size of circle shows total votes cast in each District or Position. Names and percentages given for top two candidates, and incumbent, in each race.

Beginning in 2015, the geographic outline of the 7 districts and 2 citywide positions are as follows. Some neighborhoods overlap more than one district, indicated with an asterisk*. Redistricting occurs every 10 years following the decennial U.S. census, beginning in 2022.

District	Neighborhoods
1	West Seattle, Delridge, South Park, Harbor Island, Industrial District*
2	Beacon Hill*, Central District*, Downtown*, Rainier Valley*, Georgetown, Columbia City, Seward Park, Chinatown/International District, Industrial District*
3	Beacon Hill*, Capitol Hill*, Cascade*, Central District*, First Hill*, Montlake, Rainier Valley*
4	Bryant, Cascade*, Fremont, Laurelhurst, Maple Leaf*, Ravenna, Roosevelt, Sand Point, University District, View Ridge, Wallingford*, Wedgwood*
5	Bitter Lake, Broadview, Greenwood*, Haller Lake, Lake City, Maple Leaf*, North Beach/Blue Ridge*, Northgate, Roosevelt*, View Ridge, Wedgwood*
6	Ballard, Crown Hill, Fremont*, Green Lake*, Greenwood*, North Beach/Blue Ridge*, Phinney Ridge, Wallingford*
7	Belltown, Capitol Hill*, Cascade*, Downtown*, First Hill*, Interbay, Magnolia, South Lake Union, Queen Anne
8	At-large position, citywide
9	At-large position, citywide

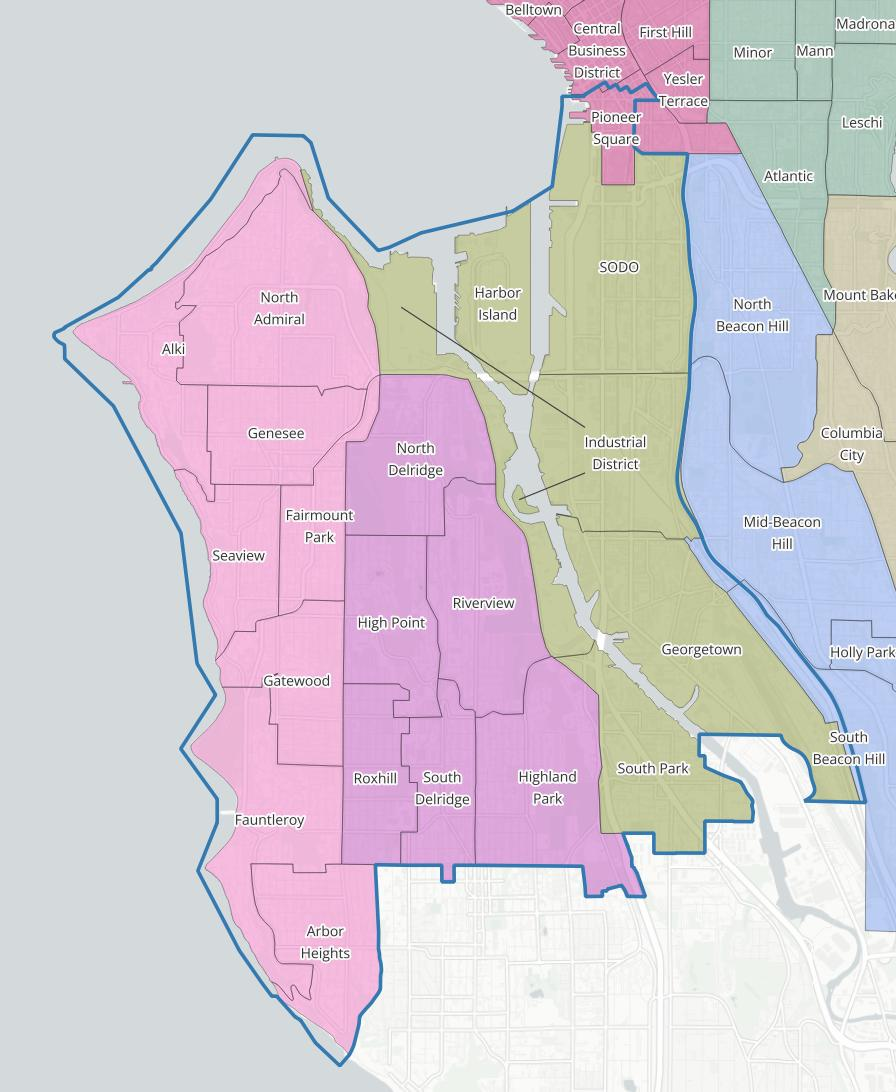
District 1

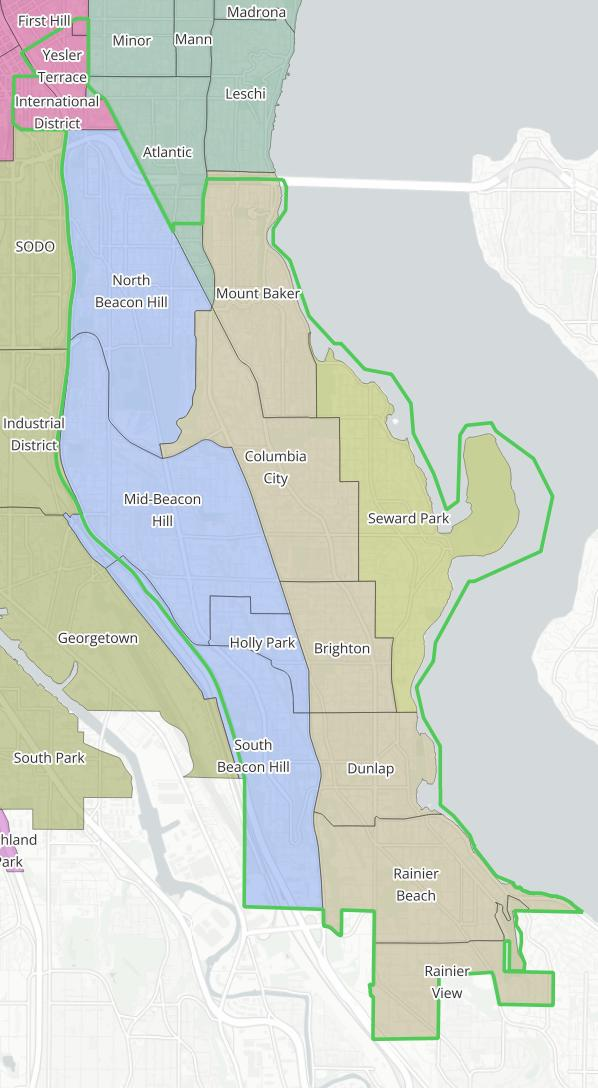
District 2

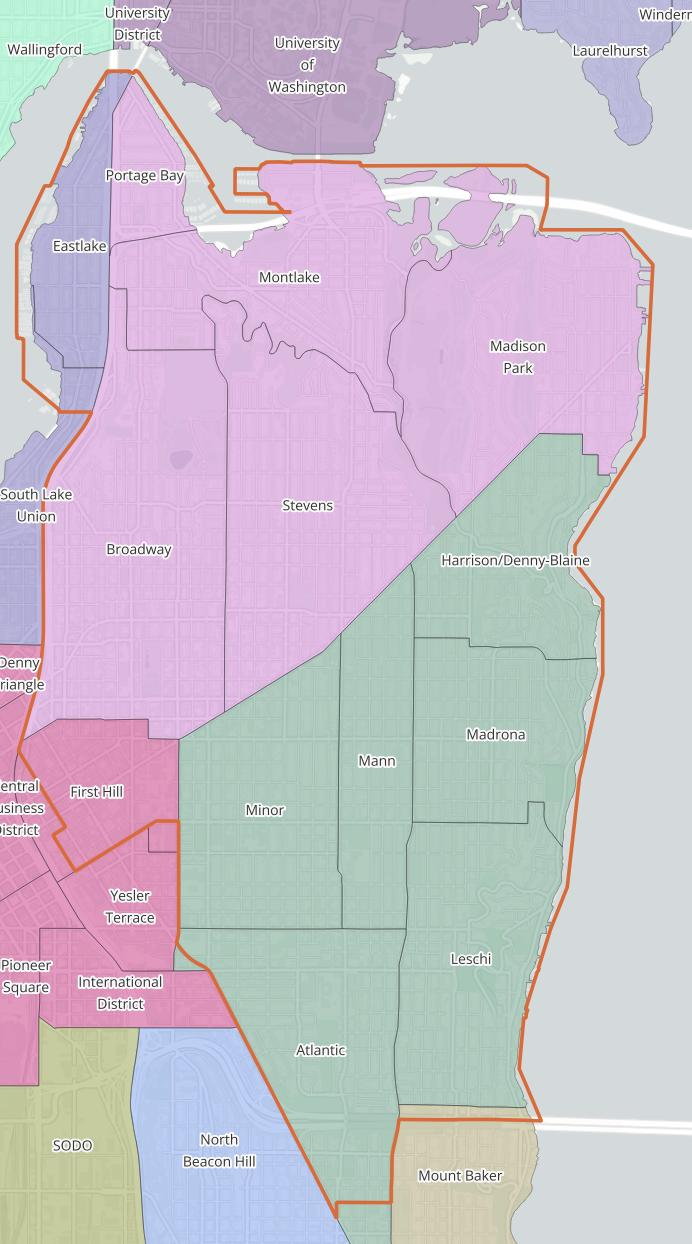
District 3

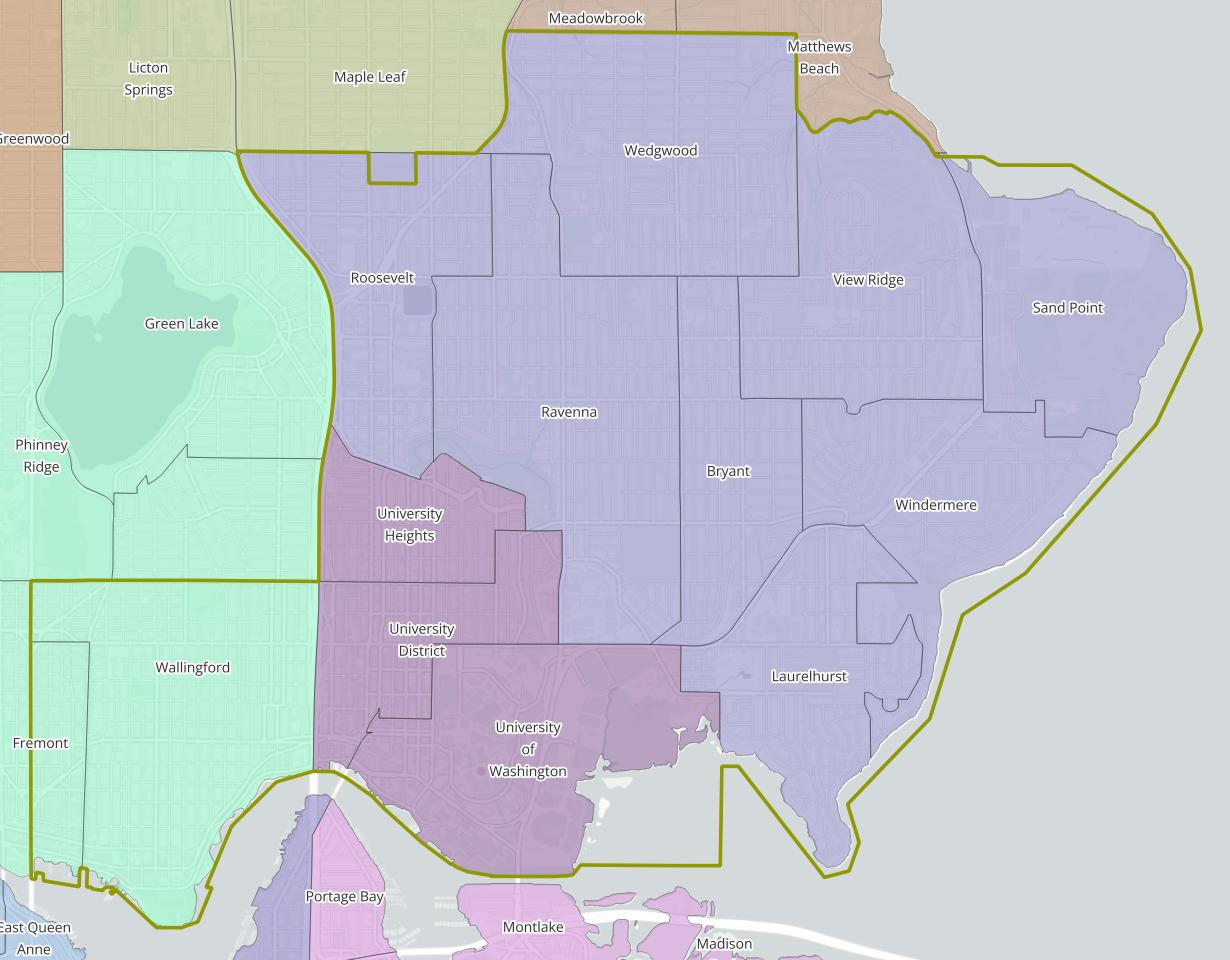
District 4

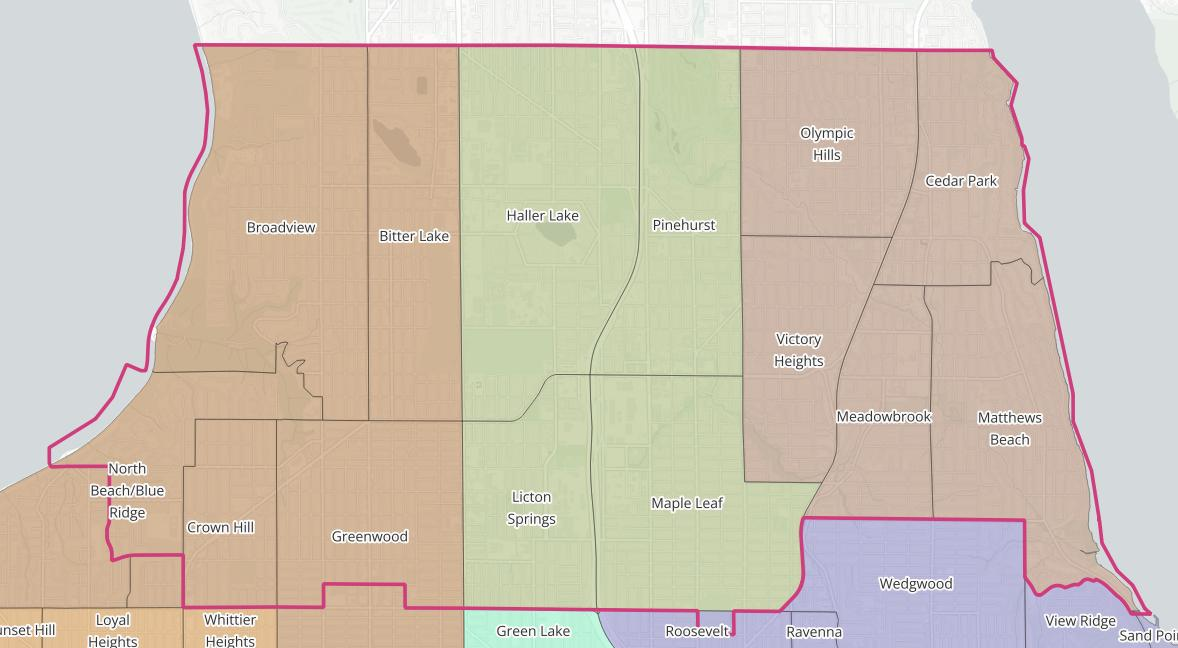
District 5

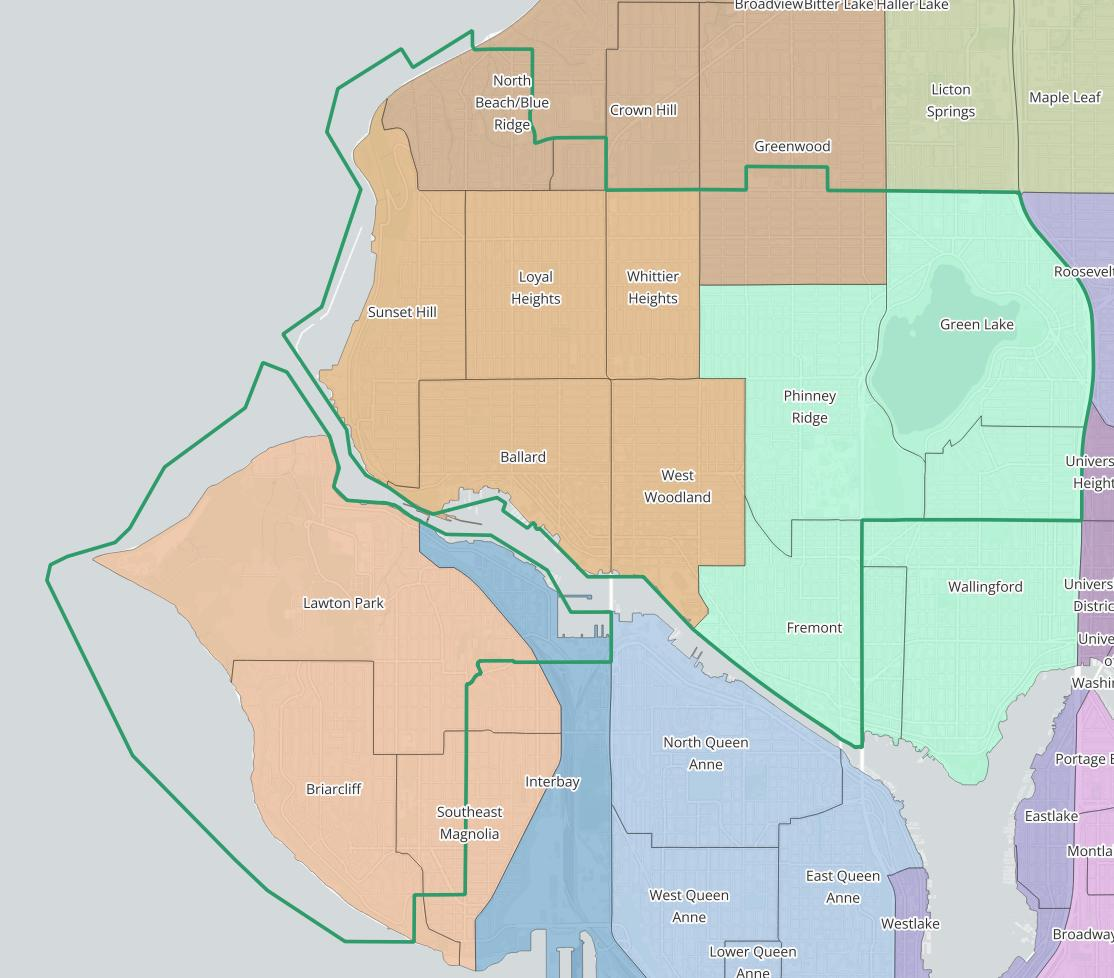
District 6

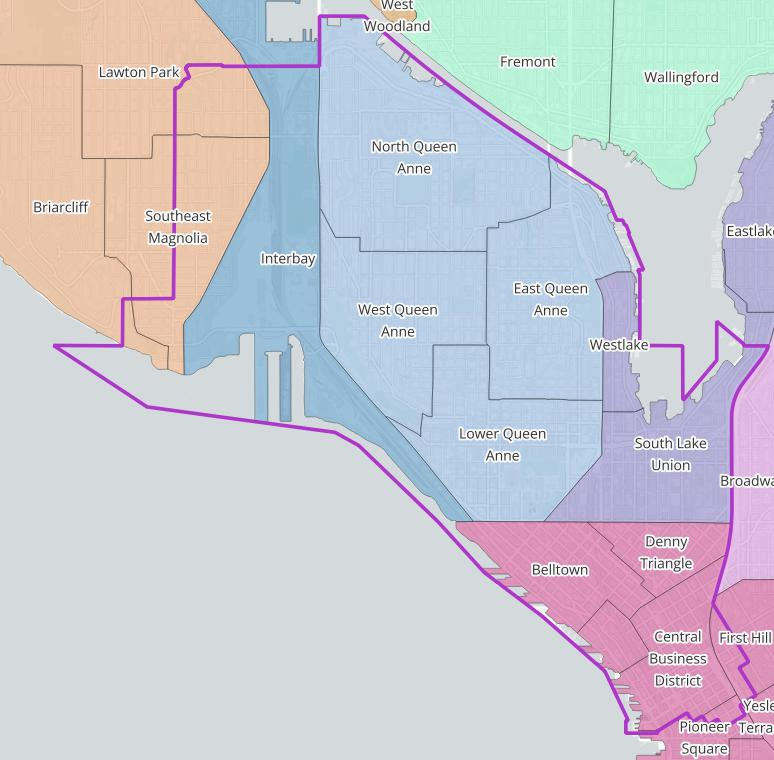
District 7

== History ==
Seattle was first incorporated as a town by an act of the Territorial Legislature on January 14, 1865. The town charter established a five-member board of trustees to govern Seattle, which appointed citizens to other positions. The act was repealed January 18, 1867, after most of the town's leading citizens petitioned for its dissolution. Seattle was again incorporated, this time as a City, on December 2, 1869. The new unicameral legislature, known as the Common Council, was elected at-large to one year terms.

In 1882, the council moved into the new Engine House, a building near 2nd Ave and Yesler Way that held the fire department, jail, and City Hall. At-large election was replaced in 1884 by a system of 14 wards and four members elected at-large, all elected to two-year terms. During the 1889 Great Seattle Fire, the Engine House burnt down and the city offices were moved into a house temporarily.

The Home Rule Charter, adopted in 1890, reorganized the city council into a bicameral legislature, with a nine-member Board of Aldermen and a sixteen-member House of Delegates. The larger council moved into the Butler Block, renting its fifth floor. However, the mayor found the offices inadequate for city business, and recommended the city move its offices into the old County Courthouse. After renovations, the building was nicknamed Katzenjammer Castle; the council moved there in 1891. In 1896, the city switched back to a single legislative body, retaining all nine of the delegates and the top four aldermen elected that year.

=== 1900s ===
The city reverted its council back to at-large positions, with non-partisan elections and a nine-member council, in 1910. Also in 1910, Washington women earned the right to vote, with the U.S. adopting the 19th amendment in 1920. In 1922, the first women were elected to the Seattle City Council: Bertha Knight Landes, who won 80% of the vote, and Kathryn Miracle, who finished fourth.

During this period, City Hall moved twice, and the council used the County–City Building until the county asked the city government to move. The Municipal Building was constructed to serve as a new city hall in 1962. Also that year, Wing Luke was elected to the city council. He was Seattle's first non-white city councilmember, as well as the first Chinese American elected to any major office in the continental U.S.

In 1967, groups like the League of Women Voters and Citizens for a Strengthened Seattle Government convinced the state government to change Seattle's city government. Budget authority moved from the city council to the mayor, changing the city from a "weak mayor" to a "strong mayor" system. Also that year, a bipartisan group of citizens, including many young lawyers, created Choose an Effective City Council (CHECC). They thought the current council was run by too many incumbent businessmen, with too many scandals, and wanted to help elect younger candidates.

In the 1967 election, Sam Smith, Phyllis Lamphere, and Tim Hill were elected to the council: the move was regarded as a "revolution" for the council, with the latter two being CHECC candidates and Smith being the first Black council member. For the next decade, increasing numbers of CHECC-endorsed or supported candidates won positions. They held a majority on the council until 1978 and changed many of Seattle's civic policies into the forms they would keep for decades.

=== District-based elections ===
The current City Hall was built in 2003. As part of the city's 1 percent for art program, an artistic bridge called Blue Glass Passage was built above the building's lobby, connecting the city council offices to their chambers.

In 2013, Seattle voters approved Charter Amendment 19 calling for the nine citywide Seattle City Council positions to be divided into seven district-elected seats and two citywide, at-large seats. The elections for the two at-large seats are held as separate contests, thus results are not proportional. Each seat is filled in two-step process - a primary election is held in August, with the two most popular candidates going on to a general election in November. The partial transition to districts started with 2013 elections for Positions 2, 4, 6, and 8 being truncated, two-year terms.

The 2015 election cycle featured all nine seats, except the seven district positions were elected to full, four-year terms, and the two at-large positions would be for truncated, two-year terms. The first primary based on the new combined district/at-large system was held on August 4, 2015, with the general elections held on November 3, 2015.

The seven district seats were up for election again in 2023; the two at-large seats will be up for election again in 2025. Only two of the seven districts retained their incumbent member in the 2023 election.

=== Timeline ===
- 1869–1883 – Seven at-large Council members elected for one-year terms.
- 1884 – Nine Council members elected: three from each of the three wards, elected to two-year terms.
- 1886 – One ward added, Council reduced to eight members: two elected from each ward for two-years terms.
- 1890 – The Home Rule Charter established eight wards and bicameral legislature. A Board of Delegates composed of nine at-large members was elected for four-year terms. House of Delegates had 16 members – Two from each ward, elected for two-year terms.
- 1892 – One ward added to make nine. Both houses to have nine members – all elected from wards.
- 1896 – New Home Rule Charter reestablished unicameral legislature with nine wards. One Council member elected from each ward for two years and four elected at large for four-year terms.
- 1905 – Two wards added to make 11. One Council member from each with four at-large – 15 council members total.
- 1907 – The Charter was amended twice during the year, the first time adding two more wards, increasing the size of Council to 17. Later, another ward was added (to make 14), increasing Council to 18 members.
- 1910 – The Charter was amended to abolish wards, reduce Council to nine at-large positions elected to three-year terms. This took effect in 1911 and remained constant until 1946. The 1910 Charter amendments also made the elections non-partisan. Prior to that candidates for Council (and other City offices) ran on party tickets.
- 1922 – First women elected to the Council: Bertha Knight Landes and Kathryn Miracle.
- 1946 – The new Charter created the four-year term.
- 1962 – First person of color elected to the Council: Wing Luke.
- 1967 – Council reforms passed and first Black person elected to the council: Sam Smith.
- 2013 – City voters pass measure changing councilmember elections to a mostly-district-based scheme.
- 2015 – First councilmember elections held under new combined district/at-large scheme.

== Salary ==
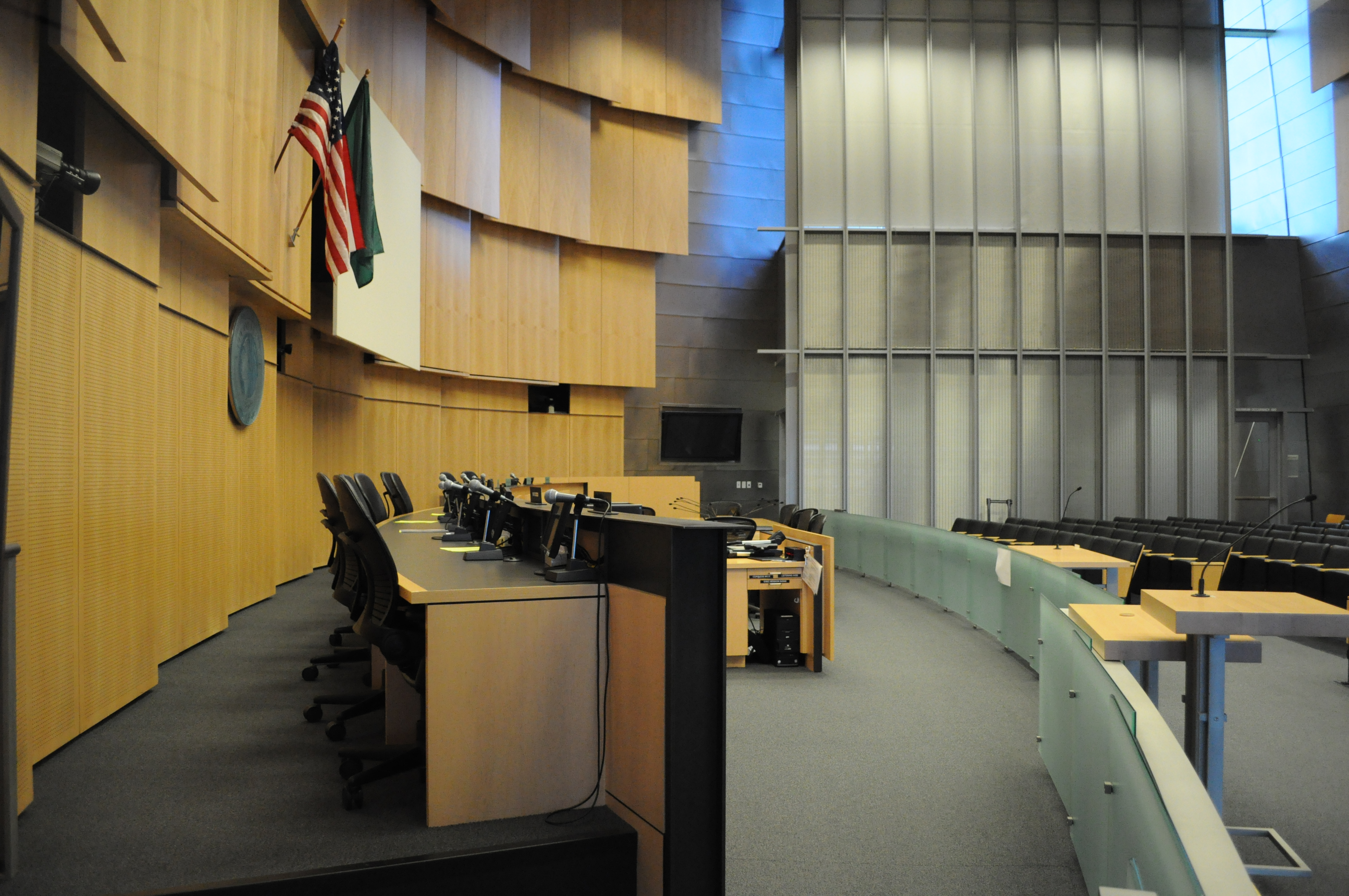
The Council chamber

In 2006, Seattle City Council salaries exceeded $100,000 for the first time. This made Seattle's city council among the highest paid in the United States, behind only Los Angeles and Philadelphia.

As of 2021, salaries of district councilmembers are authorized to be $65.32 per hour. Annually, councilmembers make as much as $140,000.

== Council President ==
The Seattle City Council picks among its peers a Council President to serve a two-year term, beginning January 1 of the year following an election. The Council President serves as the official head of the City's legislative department. In addition, they are tasked with:

- Establishing of committees and appointment of committee chairs and members.
- Presiding over meetings of the full council.
- Assuming the duties and responsibilities of Mayor if the Mayor is absent or incapacitated.

== Notable past council members ==
- Bailey Gatzert, council member 1872–1873 and 1877–1878, in between was elected the city's first (and, as of, the only) Jewish mayor
- Arthur A. Denny, council member 1877–1879, leader of the Seattle pioneers known as the Denny Party
- A. W. Piper, pioneer, baker, socialist member 1877–1879. Eponym of Pipers Creek and Piper Orchard
- Henry Yesler, council member 1884–1885, Seattle pioneer, sawmill-owner, and twice mayor
- Hiram Gill, council member 1898–1902, 1904–1910, then mayor. Famous as an "Open Town" advocate, he later allied with "Closed Town" reformers.
- Reginald H. Thomson, council member 1916–1922. City Engineer and visionary. Championed the Denny Regrade, 1904 Great Northern Tunnel, development of the Cedar River watershed, railroad, electricity and sewage infrastructure improvements and member of team that designed Lake Washington's first floating bridge.
- Bertha Knight Landes, council member 1922–1926, then elected the city's first female mayor
- David Levine, council member 1931–1962
- Mildred Towne Powell (1886–1977), council member 1935–1955 and council president 1940–1941
- Paul J. Alexander, council member 1956–1969, newspaper publisher
- Wing Luke, council member 1962–1965, first Asian American elected official in Washington State
- Jeanette Williams, council member 1969–1989
- Liem Tuai, council member 1969–1973, later a King County Superior Court judge
- Bruce Chapman, council member 1971–1975, Secretary of State of Washington, Director of the United States Census Bureau, United States Ambassador to the United Nations Organizations in Vienna.
- John Miller, council member 1972–1979, later a Republican congressman
- George Benson, council member 1974 to 1994, promoter of the Waterfront Streetcar
- Norm Rice, council member 1978–1989, then elected the city's first African American mayor
- Sherry Harris, council member 1992–1996, the first out, Black, lesbian elected leader in the United States
- Charlie Chong, council member 1996–1997, West Seattle populist
- Peter Steinbrueck, council member 1997–2007, architect
- Jean Godden, council member 2003–2015, newspaper columnist before her time on the council
- Kshama Sawant, council member 2014–2024, economist and professor. The first council member to face a recall election, she narrowly defeated the recall.

== Recent councilmembers ==
Table of city councilmembers (1991–present)
Elect. year	Pos 1	Pos 2	Pos 3	Pos 4	Pos 5	Pos 6	Pos 7	Pos 8	Pos 9
1991	Sue Donaldson	Jane Noland	Sherry Harris	George Benson	Margaret Pageler	Tom Weeks	Jim Street	Cheryl Chow	Martha Choe
1994	Sue Donaldson	Jane Noland	Sherry Harris	Jan Drago	Margaret Pageler	Tom Weeks	Jim Street	Cheryl Chow	Martha Choe
1995	Sue Donaldson	Jane Noland	John E. Manning	Jan Drago	Margaret Pageler	Tom Weeks	Tina Podlodowski	Cheryl Chow	Martha Choe
1996	Sue Donaldson	Jane Noland	John E. Manning	Jan Drago	Margaret Pageler	Charlie Chong (Note: Elected in special election after Tom Weeks resigned to work for Seattle Public Schools.)	Tina Podlodowski	Cheryl Chow	Martha Choe
1997	Sue Donaldson	Richard Conlin	Peter Steinbrueck	Jan Drago	Margaret Pageler	Nick Licata	Tina Podlodowski	Richard McIver (Note: First appointed to the council in January 1997 when John Manning resigned in December 1996. He would serve in Position 3 until the November election but chose to run for the open Position 8 seat, winning that election.)	Martha Choe
1999	Judy Nicastro	Richard Conlin	Peter Steinbrueck	Jan Drago	Margaret Pageler	Nick Licata	Heidi Wills	Richard McIver	Jim Compton
2001	Judy Nicastro	Richard Conlin	Peter Steinbrueck	Jan Drago	Margaret Pageler	Nick Licata	Heidi Wills	Richard McIver	Jim Compton
2003	Jean Godden	Richard Conlin	Peter Steinbrueck	Jan Drago	Tom Rasmussen	Nick Licata	David Della	Richard McIver	Jim Compton
2005	Jean Godden	Richard Conlin	Peter Steinbrueck	Jan Drago	Tom Rasmussen	Nick Licata	David Della	Richard McIver	Jim Compton
2007	Jean Godden	Richard Conlin	Bruce Harrell	Jan Drago	Tom Rasmussen	Nick Licata	Tim Burgess	Richard McIver	Sally J. Clark
2009	Jean Godden	Richard Conlin	Bruce Harrell	Sally Bagshaw	Tom Rasmussen	Nick Licata	Tim Burgess	Mike O'Brien	Sally J. Clark
2011	Jean Godden	Richard Conlin	Bruce Harrell	Sally Bagshaw	Tom Rasmussen	Nick Licata	Tim Burgess	Mike O'Brien	Sally J. Clark
2014	Jean Godden	Kshama Sawant	Bruce Harrell	Sally Bagshaw	Tom Rasmussen	Nick Licata	Tim Burgess	Mike O'Brien	Sally J. Clark
2015	Jean Godden	Kshama Sawant	Bruce Harrell	Sally Bagshaw	Tom Rasmussen	Nick Licata	Tim Burgess	Mike O'Brien	John Okamoto (Note: Appointed to fill vacancy after Sally Clark resigned to work for University of Washington.)
-	Distr 1	Distr 2	Distr 3	Distr 4	Distr 5	Distr 6	Distr 7	Pos 8	Pos 9
2015	Lisa Herbold	Bruce Harrell	Kshama Sawant	Rob Johnson	Debora Juarez	Mike O'Brien	Sally Bagshaw	Tim Burgess	Lorena Gonzalez
2015	Lisa Herbold	Bruce Harrell	Kshama Sawant	Rob Johnson	Debora Juarez	Mike O'Brien	Sally Bagshaw	Kirsten Harris-Talley (Note: Appointed to fill vacancy after Tim Burgess became mayor in September 2017)	Lorena Gonzalez
2017	Lisa Herbold	Bruce Harrell	Kshama Sawant	Abel Pacheco Jr. (Note: Appointed to fill vacancy following the resignation of Rob Johnson in April 2019.)	Debora Juarez	Mike O'Brien	Sally Bagshaw	Teresa Mosqueda	Lorena Gonzalez
2019	Lisa Herbold	Tammy Morales	Kshama Sawant	Alex Pedersen	Debora Juarez	Dan Strauss	Andrew Lewis	Teresa Mosqueda	Lorena Gonzalez
2021	Lisa Herbold	Tammy Morales	Kshama Sawant	Alex Pedersen	Debora Juarez	Dan Strauss	Andrew Lewis	Teresa Mosqueda	Sara Nelson
2023	Rob Saka	Tammy Morales	Joy Hollingsworth	Maritza Rivera	Cathy Moore (Note: Resigned on July 7, 2025, citing health and personal issues.)	Dan Strauss	Bob Kettle	Teresa Mosqueda	Sara Nelson
2024	Rob Saka	Tammy Morales	Joy Hollingsworth	Maritza Rivera	Cathy Moore	Dan Strauss	Bob Kettle	Tanya Woo (Note: Appointed to fill the vacancy after Teresa Mosqueda resigned after being elected to King County Council.)	Sara Nelson
2024	Rob Saka	Tammy Morales	Joy Hollingsworth	Maritza Rivera	Cathy Moore	Dan Strauss	Bob Kettle	Alexis Mercedes Rinck (Note: Elected in a special election to fill the remaining term of Teresa Mosqueda after her resignation.)	Sara Nelson
2025	Rob Saka	Mark Solomon (Note: Appointed to fill the vacancy after Tammy Morales resigned, citing a toxic workplace. Solomon stated he would not run in the 2025 special election to fill the remainder of the term.)	Joy Hollingsworth	Maritza Rivera	Cathy Moore	Dan Strauss	Bob Kettle	Alexis Mercedes Rinck	Sara Nelson
2025	Rob Saka	Eddie Lin (Note: Elected in a special election to fill the remaining term of Tammy Morales after her resignation.)	Joy Hollingsworth	Maritza Rivera	Debora Juarez (Note: Appointed to fill the position after Moore resigned.)	Dan Strauss	Bob Kettle	Alexis Mercedes Rinck	Sara Nelson
2026	Rob Saka	Eddie Lin	Joy Hollingsworth	Maritza Rivera	Debora Juarez	Dan Strauss	Bob Kettle	Alexis Mercedes Rinck	Dionne Foster
