= Rob Johnson (Seattle politician) =

American politician (born 1977/78)

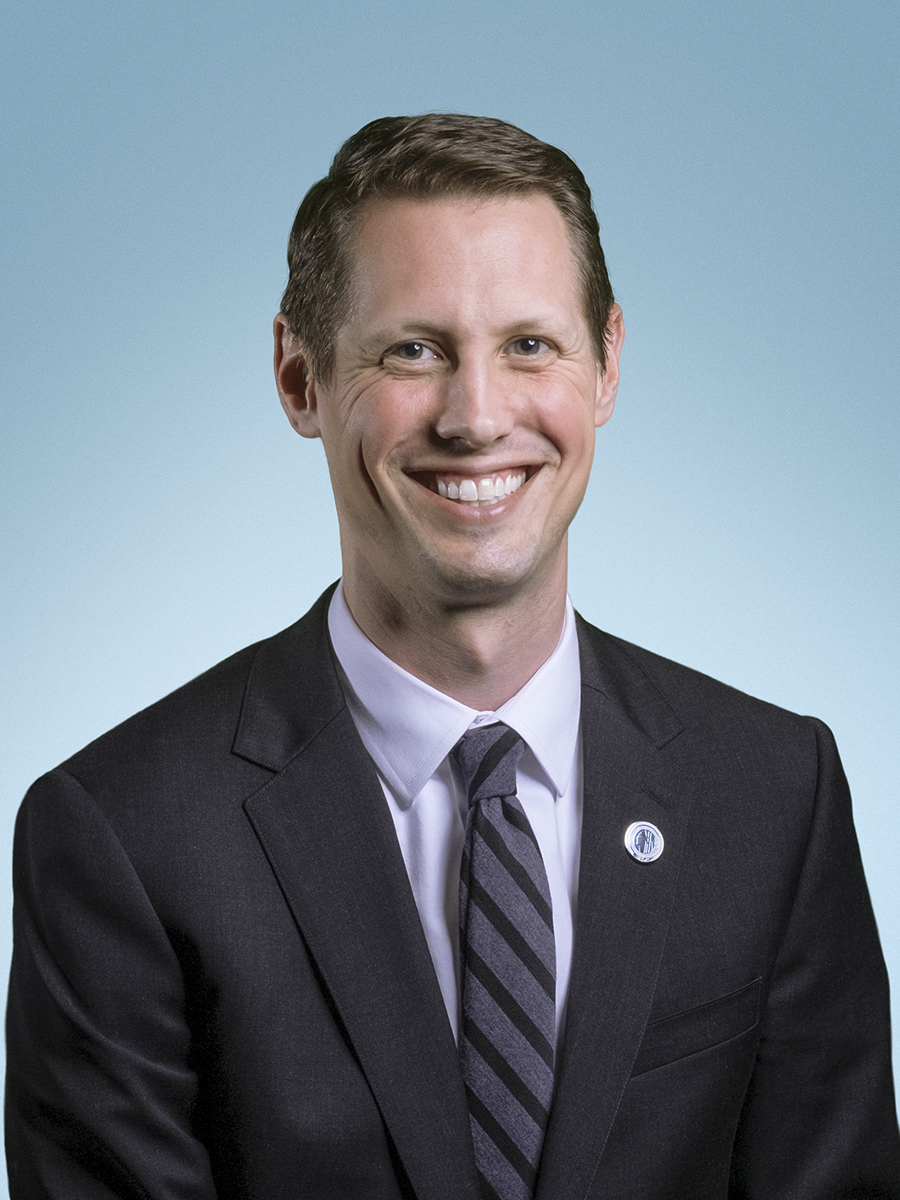
- Johnson in 2016

Member of the Seattle City Council from District 4
- In office January 4, 2016 – April 5, 2019
- Preceded by: Constituency established
- Succeeded by: Abel Pacheco Jr.

Personal details
- Born: 1977 or 1978 (age 47–48)
- Spouse: Katie
- Children: 3 daughters
- Education: Willamette University (BA); University of California, Los Angeles (MURP)

Robert M. Johnson (born 1977 or 1978) is an American politician. He served on the Seattle City Council representing the fourth district, covering northeast Seattle and the area around the University of Washington, from 2016 until his resignation in April 2019.

== Early life and education ==
Johnson is a fifth-generation Seattleite. He has a bachelor's degree in political science from Willamette University and a Master's in Transportation Planning from University of California, Los Angeles. Prior to the election, Johnson was executive director of Transportation Choices Coalition, an advocacy group in Washington state, where he managed their campaign for the Sound Transit 2 rail expansion programs.

== Seattle City Council ==
=== Election ===
In 2014, Johnson announced his run for the newly created District 4 seat in the Seattle City Council. He campaigned on an urbanist platform, focusing on increasing density around public transit and improving the walkability in the city. Johnson would challenge longtime councilmember Jean Godden, a city-wide member who was forced to run in the district elections. There was three other challengers in the election, which included neighborhood activist Tony Provine, Michael Maddux, a litigation paralegal, and University of Washington employee Abel Pacheco.

In the August primary, Johnson came in first with 32.84% and advanced to the general election, alongside Maddux, who earned 24.64%. Godden, who was seen as the most vulnerable incumbent, was the only city councilmember running for reelection to lose in the primary.

Johnson and Maddux agreed on most issues and were seen as "BFFs," who regularly carpooled to events together. Johnson focused on public transit, and said he was the candidate that would get things done. Maddux concentrated on affordable housing and said he would bring new, innovative ideas to the council.

In the November general election, Johnson defeated Maddux, 51.30% to 48.22%, a margin of 708 votes.

=== Tenure ===
Johnson was sworn into office on January 4, 2016. Several days later, he was appointed to the Sound Transit board of directors by King County Executive Dow Constantine, replacing fellow councilmember Mike O'Brien. Johnson was chair of the Planning, Land Use, and Zoning Committee, and focused on zoning, affordable housing, and transportation.

While on the council, Johnson shepherded a housing and transit levy that voters passed, as well as a $600 million education levy. His plans for upzoning certain areas of Seattle unanimously passed the council, which allowed for larger building in exchange for developers including or paying for some low-income housing. The upzone legislation received pushback from some community groups, including people around 35th Avenue Northeast, who were against bike lanes and road redesigns.

In November 2018, he announced that he would not seek a second term on the city council. In late March 2019, Johnson announced he would vacate his council seat on April 5, 2019. After his resignation, Abel Pacheco Jr. was appointed to take Johnson's place until the November 2019 election. Shortly after his resignation announcement, Johnson was offered a position as transportation adviser to the NHL Seattle project. Johnson is currently the senior vice president of sustainability for the Seattle Kraken.

== Personal life ==
He lives in the Ravenna neighborhood with his wife, Katie, and their three daughters.

== Electoral history ==
Seattle City Council District 4, Primary Election 2015
Party	Candidate	Votes	%
Nonpartisan	Rob Johnson	5,516	32.84%
Nonpartisan	Michael Maddux	4,138	24.64%
Nonpartisan	Jean Godden	3,307	19.69%
Nonpartisan	Tony Provine	2,372	14.12%
Nonpartisan	Abel Pacheco	1,416	8.43%
Nonpartisan	Write-in	46	0.27%
Turnout		17,154	31.64%
Registered electors		54,208	

Seattle City Council District 4, General Election 2015
Party	Candidate	Votes	%
Nonpartisan	Rob Johnson	11,808	51.30%
Nonpartisan	Michael Maddux	11,100	48.22%
Nonpartisan	Write-in	111	0.48%
Majority		708	3.08%
Turnout		25,782	46.61%
Registered electors		55,309	
