= 2023 Seattle City Council election =

- November 7, 2023; Officially nonpartisan

7 of the 9 seats on the Seattle City Council 5 seats needed for a majority
	Majority party	Minority party
Party	Democratic	Socialist Alternative
Seats before	8	1
Seats won	9	0
Seat change	▲1	▼1
President of the City Council before election
Debora Juarez
Nonpartisan
Elected President of the City Council
Sara Nelson
Nonpartisan

The 2023 Seattle City Council election was held on November 7, 2023, following a primary election on August 1. The seven district-based seats of the nine-member Seattle City Council were up for election. The districts had been modified based on the results of the 2020 census. Four incumbent members of the city council did not seek reelection.

All seven contests in the general election were between a more moderate candidate endorsed by The Seattle Times and a more progressive candidate endorsed by The Stranger. Seattle Times endorsees won 5 of the 7 races, marking a significant shift from the 2019 Seattle City Council election, in which more progressive Stranger-endorsed candidates won 6 of the 7 contested seats.

== Background ==
The Seattle Redistricting Commission approved a new map for the city council districts on November 8, 2022. The 2023 election cycle was the fourth to use Seattle's democracy voucher program. At least 16,000 people utilized the democracy voucher program during this election.

== District 1 ==
District 1
- November 7, 2023
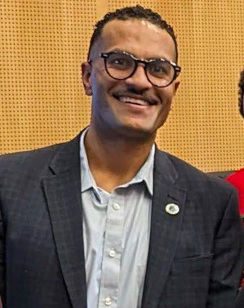

Candidate	Rob Saka	Maren Costa
Popular vote	18,382	15,431
Percentage	54.15%	45.46%
- Precinct results Saka: 50–60% 60–70% 70–80% 80–90% >90% Costa: 40–50% 50–60% 60–70% 70–80% Tie: 50%
Councilor before election
Lisa Herbold
Democratic
Elected Councilor
Rob Saka
Democratic

=== Campaign ===
Incumbent councilor Lisa Herbold, first elected in the 2015 election, announced on December 9, 2022, that she would not seek reelection. She stated that she did not want the election in the 1st district to repeat the 2021 Seattle City Attorney election in which Ann Davison, a Republican, was elected against a divided progressive field.

Preston Anderson, a social worker and unsuccessful candidate in the 2019 Pierce County Council election, and Maren Costa, a leader of Amazon Employees for Climate Justice that National Labor Relations Board ruled to be illegally fired by Amazon, announced their campaigns in January 2023. Rob Saka, a lawyer for Meta Platforms who was a member of the King County Districting Committee and the committee that selected Seattle Police Chief Adrian Z. Diaz, announced his campaign on February 14.

Phil Tavel, an administrative law judge who unsuccessful ran against Herbold in 2019, announced his candidacy on February 28. Stephen Brown, the co-owner of Eltana Bagels, announced his campaign on March 7, and stated that he considered running for office "during the height of the Black Lives Matter, George Floyd protests, and CHOP occupancy". Lucy Barefoot, Jean Craciun, and Mia Jacobson also ran while Michael Auger conducted a write-in campaign. AnnaLisa LaFayette withdrew from the campaign.

=== Campaign finance ===
All of the candidates participated in the democracy voucher program.

Brown's significant usage of billboards, which cost $1,000 per week, and mailers placed him above the $93,750 fundraising threshold for the democracy vouchers program. Brown told the Seattle Ethics and Elections Commission that the advertisements were meant for his business and not his campaign. Costa and Saka also exceeded the fundraising limit, but the SEEC lifted their limit. Elliott Bay Neighbors Committee has spent $40,000 in support of Saka.

Candidate	Campaign committee			
Candidate	Raised	Spent	COH	L&D
Preston Anderson	$50,758.05	$44,711.48	$6,046.57	$9,200.40
Michael Auger	$0.00	$0.00	$0.00	$0.00
Lucy Barefoot	$1,180.00	$1,983.20	-$803.20	$0.00
Stephen Brown	$78,414.65	$73,184.12	$5,230.53	$9,026.10
Maren Costa	$87,752.00	$66,335.43	$21,416.57	$0.00
Jean Craciun	$37,493.00	$23,266.07	$14,226.93	$4,456.00
Mia Jacobson	$0.00	$0.00	$0.00	$0.00
Rob Saka	$93,730.00	$85,444.67	$8,285.33	$4,550.00
Phillip Tavel	$48,802.43	$35,760.45	$13,041.98	$10,322.49

=== Candidate forums ===
2023 Seattle City Council District 1 candidate forums
No.	Date	Host	Moderator	Nonpartisan	Nonpartisan	Nonpartisan	Nonpartisan	Nonpartisan	Nonpartisan	Nonpartisan	Nonpartisan
Key: P Participant A Absent N Not invited I Invited W Withdrawn											
Key: P Participant A Absent N Not invited I Invited W Withdrawn				Preston Anderson	Lucy Barefoot	Stephen Brown	Maren Costa	Jean Craciun	Mia Jacobson	Rob Saka	Phillip Tavel
1	Jun. 6, 2023			P	P	P	P	P	P	P	P
2	Jun. 10, 2023	34th District; Democrats	Rachel Glass	P	N	P	P	A	N	P	P
3	Jul. 26, 2023		Paula Barnes	P	P	P	P	P	N	P	P* (Note: Tavel was at a memorial, so his campaign manager Jules Williams participated in his stead)

=== Endorsements ===
Maren Costa

Local officials

- Teresa Mosqueda, member of the Seattle City Council

Organizations

- LGBTQ Victory Fund
- National Women's Political Caucus of Washington
- United Food and Commercial Workers 3000

Newspapers

- The Stranger

Labor unions

- SEIU Local 925
- UFCW Local 3000

Individuals

- Preston Anderson, candidate in 2023 Seattle City Council district 1
- Stephen Brown, candidate in 2023 Seattle City Council district 1
- Lucy Barefoot, candidate in 2023 Seattle City Council district 1
- Mia Jacobeson, candidate in 2023 Seattle City Council district 1
- Phil Tavel, candidate in 2023 Seattle City Council district 1
Rob Saka

Local officials

- Ryan Calkins, president of the Port of Seattle board of commissioners
- Norm Rice, former mayor of Seattle (1990–1998)
- Girmay Zahilay, member of the King County Council

Organizations

- Washington's 34th legislative district Democrats

Newspapers

- The Seattle Times

=== Primary results ===
2023 Seattle City Council District 1 primary
Candidate	Votes	%
Maren Costa	8,787	33.13%
Rob Saka	6,397	23.12%
Phil Tavel	5,324	20.07%
Preston Anderson	2,222	8.38%
Stephen Brown	1,659	6.26%
Jean Craciun	838	3.16%
Lucy Barefoot	767	2.89%
Mia Jacobson	472	1.78%
Write-in	55	0.21%
Total votes	26,521	100.00%

=== General election debates & forum ===
2023 Seattle City Council District 1 general election debates & candidate forum
No.	Date	Host	Moderator	Nonpartisan	Nonpartisan
Key: P Participant A Absent N Not invited I Invited W Withdrawn					
Key: P Participant A Absent N Not invited I Invited W Withdrawn				Rob Saka	Maren Costa
1	Sep. 22, 2023	Seattle Channel	Brian Callanan	P	P
2	Sep. 25, 2023	Senior Center of West Seattle; West Seattle Blog	Tracy Record	P	P
3	Oct. 3, 2023	KING-TV; Seattle City-Club	Matt Markovich; Maleeha Syed; Natalie Swaby	P	P

=== General election results ===
2023 Seattle City Council District 1
Candidate	Votes	%
Rob Saka	18,382	54.15%
Maren Costa	15,431	45.46%
Write-in	132	0.39%
Total votes	33,945	100.00%

== District 2 ==
District 2
- November 7, 2023
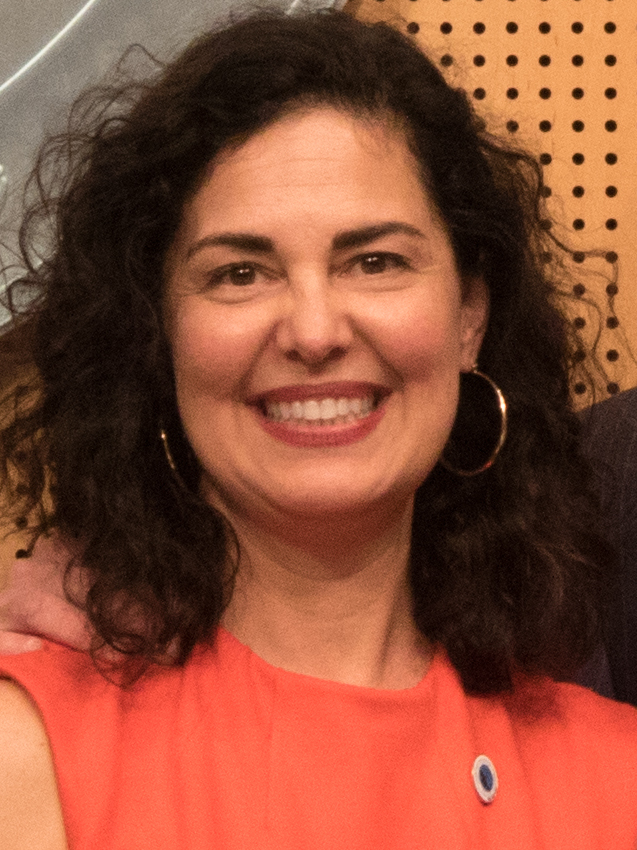

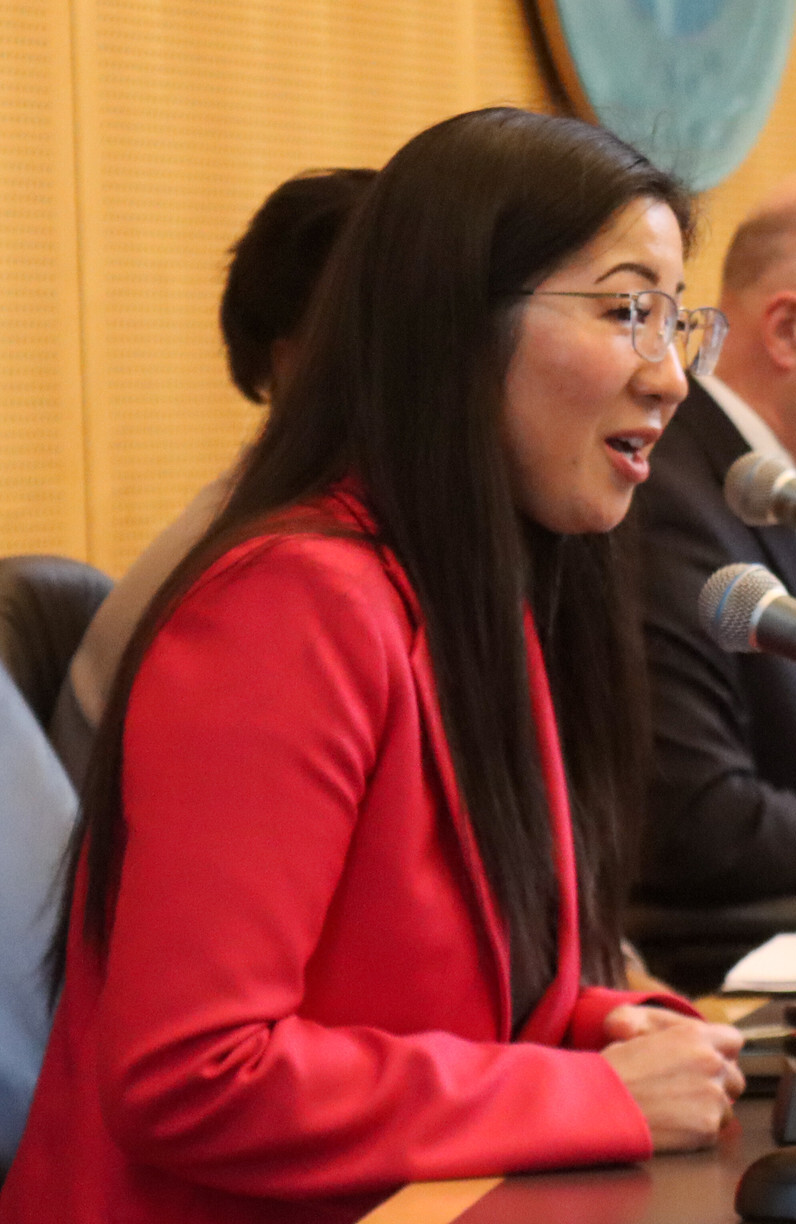
Candidate	Tammy Morales	Tanya Woo
Popular vote	13,123	12,720
Percentage	50.65%	49.10%
- Precinct results Morales: 50–60% 60–70% 70–80% Woo: 50–60% 60–70% 70–80% 80–90% Tie: 50% No votes
Councilor before election
Tammy Morales
Democratic
Elected Councilor
Tammy Morales
Democratic

=== Campaign ===
Incumbent Tammy Morales announced her reelection campaign on February 1, 2023. Tanya Woo, an activist from the Chinatown–International District and a member of the Chinatown International District Community Watch, announced her campaign on February 16, 2023. Green Party steering committee co-chair Margaret Elisabeth also ran for the seat. Seattle Parks Sustainability and Environmental Engagement manager Chukundi Salisbury was named as a potential candidate, but did not run.

Isaiah Willoughby, a withdrawn candidate, did not gain traction or raise funds, but received attention due to his 2021 pleading guilty to charges of arson committed during the events of the Capitol Hill Occupied Protest.

=== Campaign finance ===
All the candidates participated in the democracy voucher program.

Candidate	Campaign committee			
Candidate	Raised	Spent	COH	L&D
Margaret Elisabeth	$2,651.71	$2,125.87	$525.84	$1,623.64
Tammy Morales	$93,750.00	$76,489.28	$17,260.72	$6,509.08
Tanya Woo	$93,729.54	$84,590.52	$9,139.02	$4,410.86

=== Endorsements ===
Margaret Elisabeth

Organizations

- Green Party of Seattle
- Green Party of Washington State
Tammy Morales

U.S. representatives

- Pramila Jayapal, U.S. representative from Washington's 7th congressional district

State legislators

- Liz Berry, state representative from the 36th district
- Rebecca Saldaña, state senator from the 37th district

Local officials

- Lorena González, former member of the Seattle City Council
- Larry Gossett, former King County Councilor
- Teresa Mosqueda, member of the Seattle City Council
- Girmay Zahilay, King County Councilor

Organizations

- National Women's Political Caucus of Washington

Newspapers

- The Stranger

Labor unions

- SEIU Local 925
- UFCW Local 3000
Tanya Woo

State legislators

- Bob Hasegawa, state senator from the 11th district
- Sharon Tomiko Santos, state representative from the 37th district

Local officials

- Will Chen, Edmonds city councilman
- Toshiko Hasegawa, commissioner of the Port of Seattle
- Kim-Khánh Van, Renton city councilwoman

Newspapers

- The Seattle Times

=== Primary results ===
2023 Seattle City Council District 2 primary
Candidate	Votes	%
Tammy Morales (incumbent)	10,326	52.28%
Tanya Woo	8,406	42.56%
Margaret Elisabeth	937	4.74%
Write-in	81	0.41%
Total votes	19,750	100.00%

=== General election debate ===
2023 Seattle City Council District 2 general election debate
No.	Date	Host	Moderator	Nonpartisan	Nonpartisan
Key: P Participant A Absent N Not invited I Invited W Withdrawn					
Key: P Participant A Absent N Not invited I Invited W Withdrawn				Tammy Morales	Tanya Woo
1	Oct. 4, 2023	Rainier Avenue Radio	Tony Benton	P	P

=== General election results ===
2023 Seattle City Council District 2
Candidate	Votes	%
Tammy Morales (incumbent)	13,123	50.65%
Tanya Woo	12,720	49.10%
Write-in	64	0.25%
Total votes	25,907	100.00%

== District 3 ==
District 3
- November 7, 2023
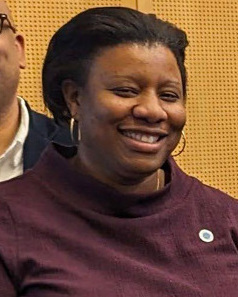

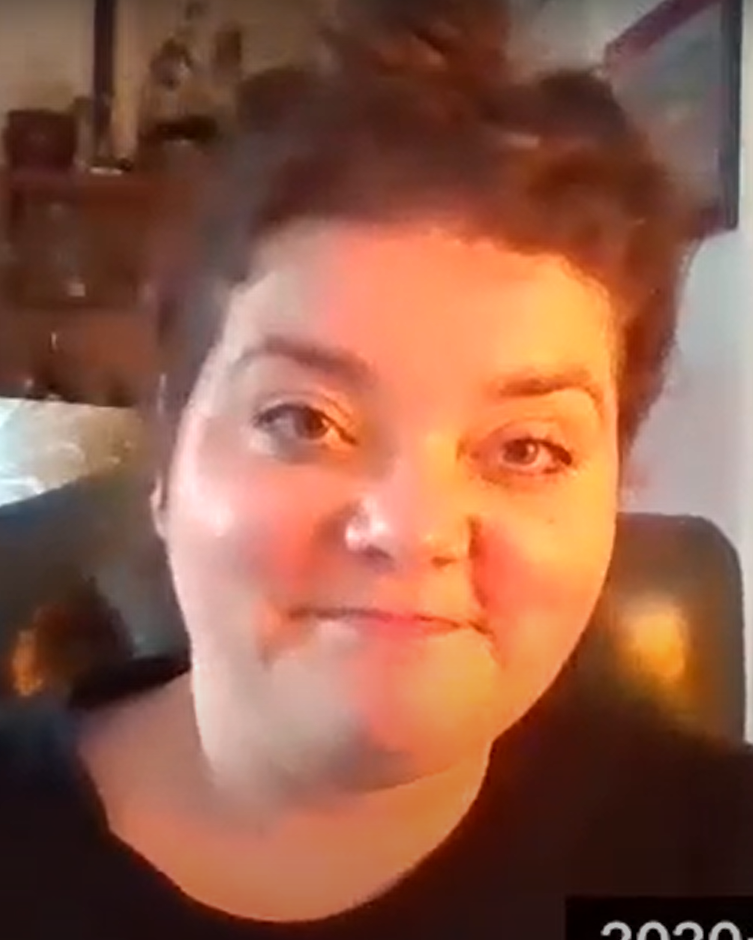
Candidate	Joy Hollingsworth	Alex Hudson
Popular vote	17,805	15,709
Percentage	52.94%	46.71%
- Precinct results Hollingsworth: 50–60% 60–70% 70–80% 80–90% >90% Hudson: 50–60% 60–70% 70–80% Tie: 40–50%
Councilor before election
Kshama Sawant
Socialist Alternative
Elected Councilor
Joy Hollingsworth

=== Campaign ===
Incumbent Kshama Sawant did not run for re-election.

Nine candidates ran for the seat:

- Shobhit Agarwal, retailer
- Ry Armstrong, actor
- Andrew Ashiofu, Seattle LGBTQ+ Commission co-chair
- Alex Cooley, cannabis business co-founder
- Bobby Goodwin, public defender
- Joy Hollingsworth, cannabis business co-founder
- Efrain Hudnell, deputy prosecutor in the King County Prosecuting Attorney's office
- Alex Hudson, executive director, Transportation Choices Coalition
- Asukaa Jaxx, perennial candidate (write-in)

=== Campaign finance ===
All of the candidates participated in the democracy voucher program.

Candidate	Campaign committee			
Candidate	Raised	Spent	COH	L&D
Shobhit Agarwal	$19,690.12	$15,786.73	$3,903.39	$3,000.00
Ry Armstrong	$36,193.11	$24,081.31	$12,111.80	$23,108.21
Andrew Ashiofu	$51,593.88	$48,297.68	$3,296.20	$0.00
Alex Cooley	$89,554.77	$76,618.09	$12,936.68	$0.00
Bobby Goodwin	$5,142.28	$4,482.70	$659.58	$2,375.51
Joy Hollingsworth	$93,750.00	$79,530.73	$14,219.27	$0.00
Efrain Hudnell	$36,184.58	$22,602.89	$13,581.69	$0.00
Alex Hudson	$89,226.00	$72,740.61	$16,485.39	$17,700.00
Asukaa Jaxx	$0.00	$0.00	$0.00	$0.00

=== Candidate forum ===
2023 Seattle City Council District 3 candidate forum
No.	Date	Host	Moderator	Nonpartisan	Nonpartisan	Nonpartisan	Nonpartisan	Nonpartisan	Nonpartisan	Nonpartisan	Nonpartisan	Nonpartisan
Key: P Participant A Absent N Not invited I Invited W Withdrawn												
Key: P Participant A Absent N Not invited I Invited W Withdrawn				Shobhit Agarwal	Ry Armstrong	Andrew Ashiofu	Alex Cooley	Robert Goodwin	Joy Hollingsworth	Efrain Hudnell	Alex Hudson	Asukaa Jaxx
1	Jun. 13, 2023	Tech4Housing; 37th District Democrats; 43rd District Democrats	Erica Barnett	P	P	P	P	P	P	P	P	N

=== Endorsements ===
Ry Armstrong

Organizations

- Green Party of Seattle
- Green Party of Washington
- National Women's Political Caucus of Washington (co-endorsed with Hollingsworth & Hudson)
Alex Cooley

Federal officials

- John McKay, former United States Attorney for the U.S. District Court for the Western District of Washington

Local officials

- Nick Licata, former member of the Seattle City Council
Joy Hollingsworth

Mayors

- Bruce Harrell, mayor of Seattle

Organizations

- LGBTQ Victory Fund
- National Women's Political Caucus of Washington (co-endorsed with Armstrong & Hudson)

Labor unions

- LiUNA Local 242
- UFCW Local 3000

Newspapers

- The Seattle Times
Alex Hudson

Organizations

- National Women's Political Caucus of Washington (co-endorsed with Armstrong & Hollingsworth)

Newspapers

- The Stranger

Labor unions

- SEIU Local 925

Individuals

- Ry Armstrong, candidate in 2023 Seattle City Council district 3
- Alex Cooley, candidate in 2023 Seattle City Council district 3
- Efrain Hudnell, candidate in 2023 Seattle City Council district 3
Declined to endorse

Organizations

- Washington's 43rd legislative district Democrats

=== Primary results ===
2023 Seattle City Council District 3 primary
Candidate	Votes	%
Joy Hollingsworth	9,690	36.87%
Alex Hudson	9,601	36.53%
Bobby Goodwin	2,755	10.48%
Alex Cooley	1,118	4.25%
Efrain Hudnell	1,081	4.11%
Andrew Ashiofu	1,059	4.03%
Ry Armstrong	488	1.86%
Shobhit Agarwal	406	1.54%
Write-in	82	0.31%
Total votes	26,280	100.00%

=== General election polling ===
Poll source	Date(s) administered	Sample size (Note: Key: A – all adults RV – registered voters LV – likely voters V – unclear)	Margin of error	Joy Hollingsworth	Alex Hudson	Other	Undecided
Change Research (D) (Note: Poll sponsored by the Northwest Progressive Institute)	October 31 – November 3, 2023	327 (LV)	± 5.7%	52%	28%	4% (Note: "Don't recall" with 3%; "Would not vote" with 1%; "Did not vote on this" with 0%)	16%

=== General election debate ===
2023 Seattle City Council District 3 general election debate
No.	Date	Host	Moderator	Nonpartisan	Nonpartisan
Key: P Participant A Absent N Not invited I Invited W Withdrawn					
Key: P Participant A Absent N Not invited I Invited W Withdrawn				Joy Hollingsworth	Alex Hudson
1	Oct. 10, 2023	KING-TV; Seattle City-Club	Greg Copeland; Hana Kim; Poe Russell	P	P

=== General election results ===
2023 Seattle City Council District 3
Candidate	Votes	%
Joy Hollingsworth	17,805	52.94%
Alex Hudson	15,709	46.71%
Write-in	119	0.35%
Total votes	33,633	100.00%

== District 4 ==
District 4
- November 7, 2023
Candidate	Maritza Rivera	Ron Davis
Popular vote	14,221	13,986
Percentage	50.25%	49.42%
- Precinct results Rivera: 40–50% 50–60% 60–70% 70–80% 80–90% Davis: 50–60% 60–70% 70–80% 80–90%
Councilor before election
Alex Pedersen
Democratic
Elected Councilor
Maritza Rivera

=== Campaign ===
Incumbent Alex Pedersen announced on January 4, 2023, that he would not run for re-election.

Entrepreneur Ron Davis announced his campaign for the seat on January 31, followed on March 10 by deputy director of the Department of Arts & Culture Maritza Rivera. George Artem and engineer Kenneth Wilson, runner-up in the 8th district in 2021, also ran for the seat. State representative Gerry Pollet was reportedly considering a campaign, but did not run.

University of Washington graduate student Matthew Mitnick launched his campaign for the seat on November 15, 2022, but on March 30, 2023, ten former campaign members published a formal statement containing serious allegations against him. Mitnick withdrew from the race on April 14.

=== Campaign finance ===
All of the candidates participated in the democracy voucher program. The SEEC lifted the fundraising limit for Davis.

Candidate	Campaign committee			
Candidate	Raised	Spent	COH	L&D
George Artem	$2,240.00	$2,085.08	$154.92	$0.00
Ron Davis	$109,525.89	$86,923.67	$22,602.22	$7,864.92
Maritza Rivera	$76,915.32	$72,828.64	$4,086.68	$16,700.00
Kenneth Wilson	$93,664.32	$87,447.39	$6,216.93	$0.00

=== Endorsements ===
Ron Davis

State legislators

- David Hackney, state representative from the 11th district

Local officials

- Ryan Calkins, president of the Port of Seattle board of commissioners
- Sam Cho, member of the Port of Seattle board of commissioners
- Toshiko Hasegawa, member of the Port of Seattle board fo commissioners
- Girmay Zahilay, King County Councilor

Organizations

- Washington's 43rd legislative district Democrats
- Washington's 46th legislative district Democrats

Newspapers

- The Stranger

Labor unions

- UFCW Local 3000
Matthew Mitnick (withdrawn)

Organizations

- Green Party of Seattle
- Green Party of Washington

Rejected by candidate

- Seattle Democratic Socialists of America
Maritza Rivera

State officials

- Bob Ferguson, Attorney General of Washington

Local officials

- Tom Rasmussen, former member of the Seattle City Council

Newspapers

- The Seattle Times
Ken Wilson

Local officials

- Rick Burke, former president of Seattle Public Schools Board
- Will Chen, member of Edmonds, Washington city council
- Margaret Pageler, former member of the Seattle City Council
- Kay Smith-Blum, former president of Seattle Public Schools Board
- Peter Steinbrueck, former member of the Seattle City Council and Port of Seattle commissioner

=== Primary results ===
2023 Seattle City Council District 4 primary
Candidate	Votes	%
Ron Davis	10,105	44.81%
Maritza Rivera	7,174	31.82%
Ken Wilson	4,772	21.16%
George Artem	460	2.04%
Write-in	38	0.17%
Total votes	22,549	100.00%

=== General election debate ===
2023 Seattle City Council District 4 general election debate
No.	Date	Host	Moderator	Nonpartisan	Nonpartisan
Key: P Participant A Absent N Not invited I Invited W Withdrawn					
Key: P Participant A Absent N Not invited I Invited W Withdrawn				Maritza Rivera	Ron Davis
1	Oct. 12, 2023	KING-TV; Seattle City-Club	Josh Cohen; Hana Kim; Matt Markovich	P	P

=== General election results ===
2023 Seattle City Council District 4
Candidate	Votes	%
Maritza Rivera	14,221	50.25%
Ron Davis	13,986	49.42%
Write-in	92	0.33%
Total votes	28,299	100.00%

== District 5 ==
District 5
- November 7, 2023
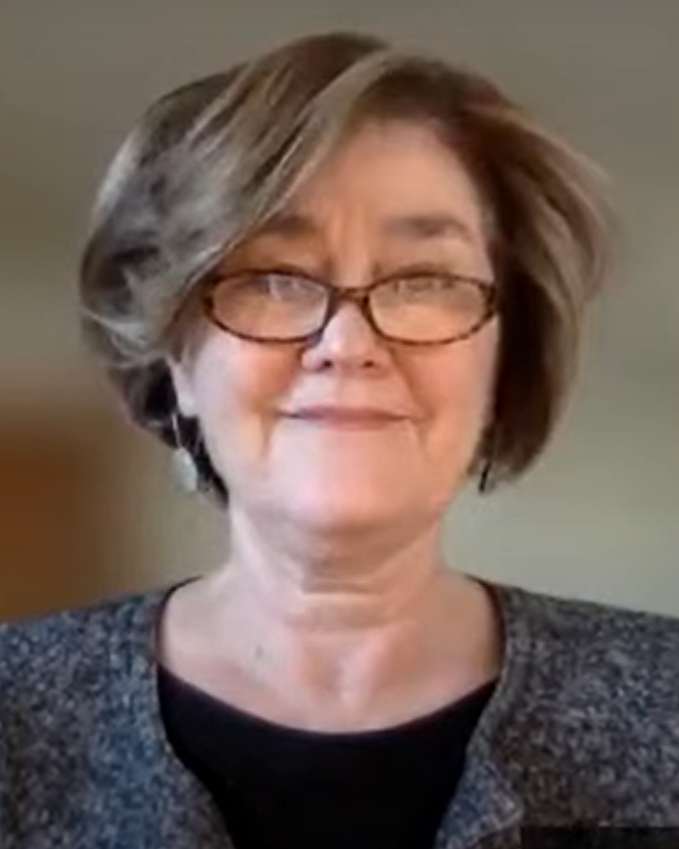

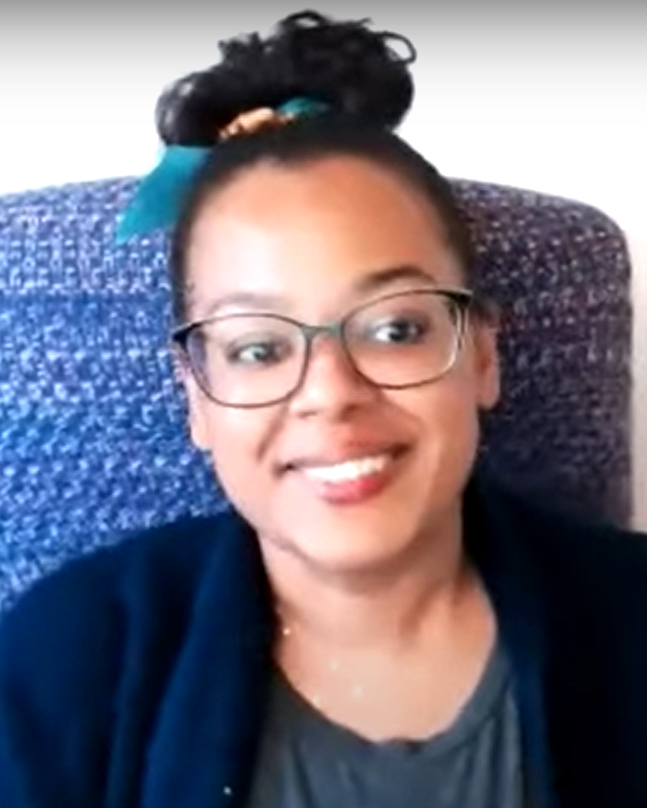
Candidate	Cathy Moore	ChrisTiana ObeySumner
Popular vote	19,334	10,729
Percentage	64.11%	35.58%
- Precinct results Moore: 50–60% 60–70% 70–80% 80–90% >90% ObeySumner: 50–60%
Councilor before election
Debora Juarez
Democratic
Elected Councilor
Cathy Moore
Democratic

=== Campaign ===
City Council president Debora Juarez declined to run for re-election. Ten candidates filed for the District 5 race:

- Boegart Bibby
- Lucca Howard
- Nilu Jenks
- Shane Macomber
- Retired King County Superior Court judge Cathy Moore
- Social equity consultant ChrisTiana ObeySumner
- Tyesha Reed
- Justin Simmons
- Bobby Tucker
- Rebecca Williamson, candidate for the 9th district in 2021

=== Campaign finance ===
All of the candidates participated in the democracy voucher program.

Candidate	Campaign committee			
Candidate	Raised	Spent	COH	L&D
Boegart Bibby	$1,544.81	$1,534.81	$10.00	$1,534.81
Lucca Howard	$2,725.66	$1,978.30	$747.36	$497.09
Nilu Jenks	$90,424.01	$75,790.17	$14,633.84	$0.00
Shane Macomber	$22,352.79	$22,613.61	-$260.82	$4,500.00
Cathy Moore	$36,330.41	$36,157.52	$172.89	$17,944.72
ChrisTiana Obeysumner	$49,746.00	$38,961.54	$10,784.46	$23,788.30
Tyesha Reed	$14,205.92	$10,735.61	$3,470.31	$2,401.23
Justin Simmons	$4,434.50	$4,164.76	$269.74	$2,099.72
Bobby Tucker	$0.00	$0.00	$0.00	$0.00
Rebecca Williamson	$0.00	$0.00	$0.00	$0.00

=== Endorsements ===
Nilu Jenks

Organizations

- Washington's 46th legislative district Democrats

Labor unions

- UFCW Local 3000
Cathy Moore

Organizations

- National Women's Political Caucus of Washington

Newspapers

- The Seattle Times
ChrisTiana ObeySumner

Organizations

- Green Party of Seattle
- Green Party of Washington

Newspapers

- The Stranger

=== Primary results ===
2023 Seattle City Council District 5 primary
Candidate	Votes	%
Cathy Moore	7,327	30.72%
ChrisTiana Obeysumner	5,823	24.41%
Nilu Jenks	4,494	18.84%
Justin Simmons	2,619	10.98%
Tye Reed	1,103	4.62%
Boegart Bibby	1,021	4.28%
Bobby Tucker	442	1.85%
Shane Macomber	356	1.49%
Rebecca Williamson	317	1.33%
Lucca Howard	266	1.12%
Write-in	84	0.35%
Total votes	23,852	100.00%

=== General election debate ===
2023 Seattle City Council District 5 general election debate
No.	Date	Host	Moderator	Nonpartisan	Nonpartisan
Key: P Participant A Absent N Not invited I Invited W Withdrawn					
Key: P Participant A Absent N Not invited I Invited W Withdrawn				Cathy Moore	ChrisTiana ObeySumner
1	Oct. 17, 2023	KING-TV; Seattle City-Club	John Hopperstad; Angela King; Jake Whittenberg	P	P

=== General election results ===
2023 Seattle City Council District 5
Candidate	Votes	%
Cathy Moore	19,334	64.11%
ChrisTiana ObeySumner	10,729	35.58%
Write-in	93	0.31%
Total votes	29,143	100.00%

== District 6 ==
District 6
- November 7, 2023
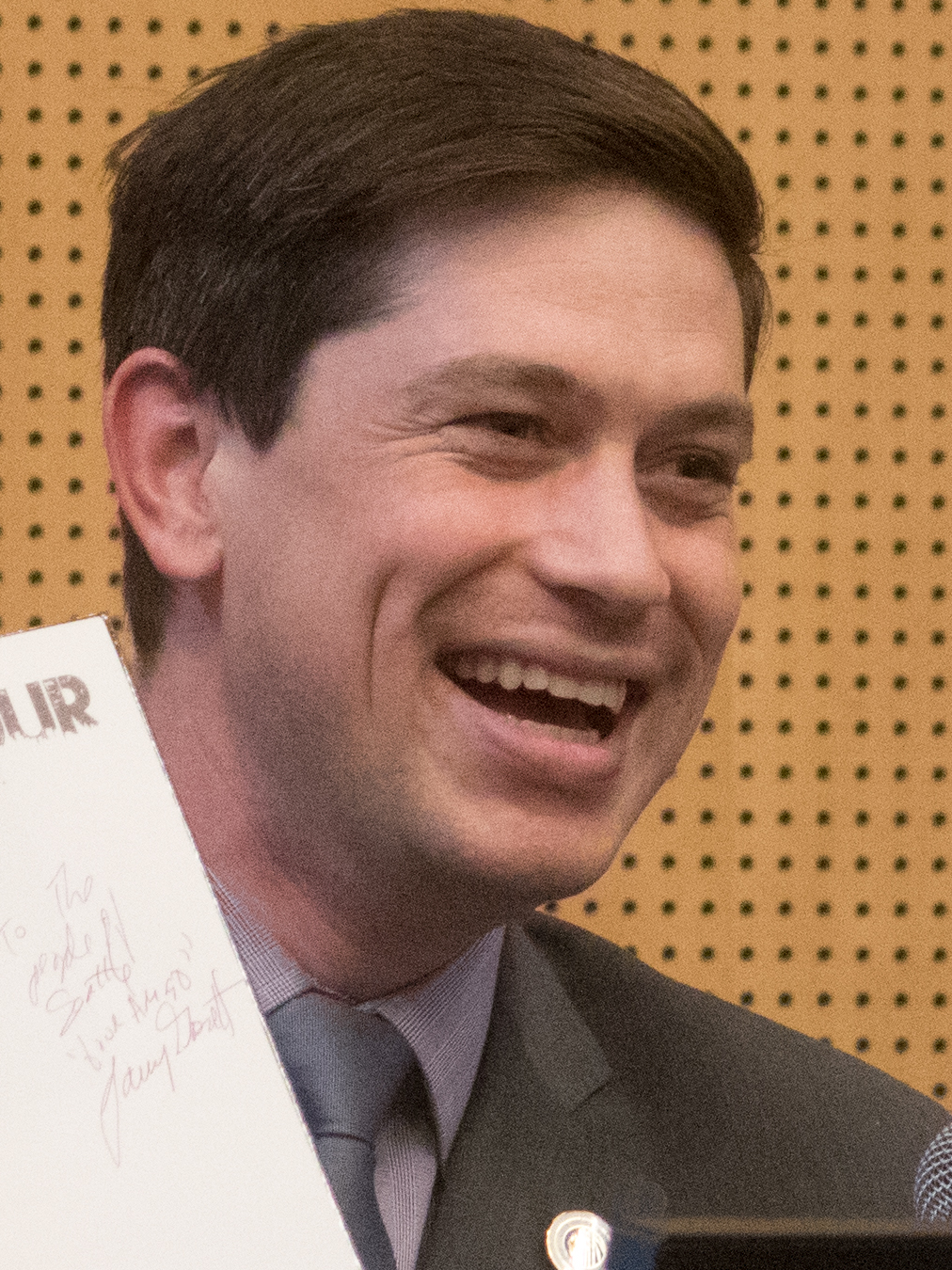

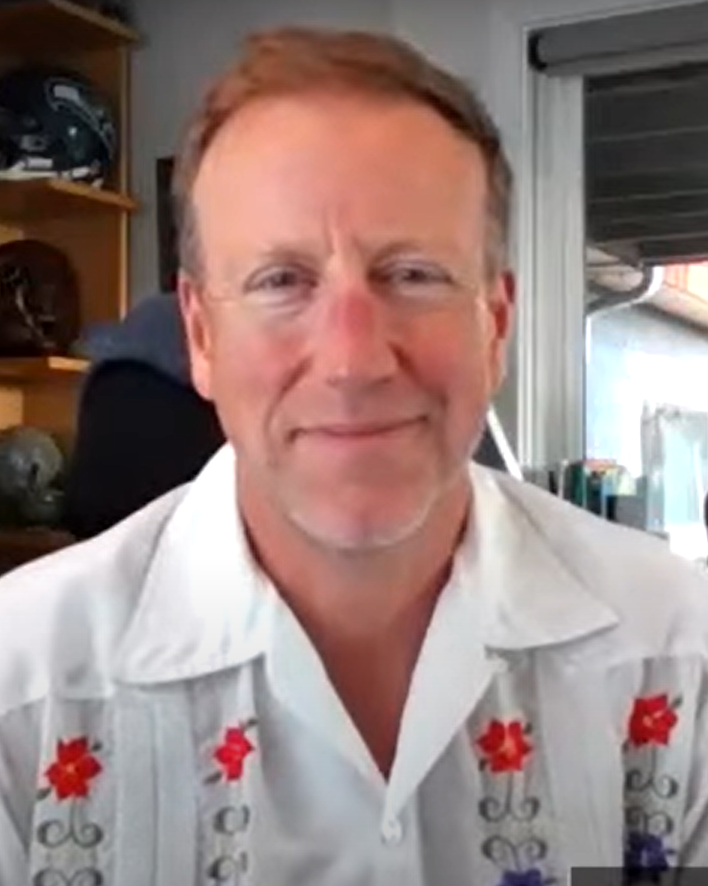
Candidate	Dan Strauss	Pete Hanning
Popular vote	20,601	18,586
Percentage	52.31%	47.19%
- Precinct results Strauss: 50–60% 60–70% 70–80% Hanning: 40–50% 50–60% 60–70% 70–80% 80–90%
Councilor before election
Dan Strauss
Democratic
Elected Councilor
Dan Strauss
Democratic

=== Campaign ===
Incumbent Dan Strauss ran for re-election. He challenged by Fremont Chamber of Commerce executive Peter Hanning, Dale Kutzera, Jon Lisbin, Victoria Palmer and attorney Shea Wilson. Strauss was the only candidate in any race to receive more than 50% of the vote in the primary.

=== Campaign finance ===
All candidates besides Lisbin participated in the democracy voucher program.

Candidate	Campaign committee			
Candidate	Raised	Spent	COH	L&D
Pete Hanning	$93,490.00	$66,558.37	$26,931.63	$15,000.00
Dale Kutzera	$1,907.41	$1,826.01	$81.40	$2,072.41
Jon Lisbin	$5,381.00	$2,004.79	$3,376.21	$0.00
Victoria Palmer	$16,770.28	$15,759.14	$1,011.14	$6,874.32
Dan Strauss	$93,760.09	$84,554.99	$9,205.10	$300.00
Shea Wilson	$20,276.08	$19,104.54	$1,171.54	$3,000.00

=== Endorsements ===
Peter Hanning

Newspapers

- The Seattle Times
Dan Strauss

State legislators

- Frank Chopp, state representative
- Jessyn Farrell, former state representative
- David Frockt, former state senator
- Noel Frame, state senator
- Julia Reed, state representative
- Gael Tarleton, former state representative

Local officials

- Sally Bagshaw, former member of the Seattle City Council
- Teresa Mosqueda, member of the Seattle City Council
- Ryan Calkins, commissioner of the Port of Seattle
- Sam Cho, commissioner of the Port of Seattle
- Fred Felleman, commissioner of the Port of Seattle
- Toshiko Hasegawa, commissioner of the Port of Seattle
- Girmay Zahilay, King County Councilmember

Organizations

- Washington's 46th legislative district Democrats

Newspapers

- The Stranger

Labor unions

- SEIU Local 925
- UFCW Local 3000
Declined to endorse

Organizations

- Washington's 43rd legislative district Democrats

=== Primary results ===
2023 Seattle City Council District 6 primary
Candidate	Votes	%
Dan Strauss (incumbent)	15,869	51.76%
Pete Hanning	8,996	29.34%
Shea Wilson	1,900	6.20%
Dale Kutzera	1,383	4.51%
Victoria Palmer	1,355	4.42%
Jon Lisbon	1,016	3.31%
Write-in	140	0.46%
Total votes	30,659	100.00%

=== General election results ===
2023 Seattle City Council District 6
Candidate	Votes	%
Dan Strauss (incumbent)	20,601	52.31%
Pete Hanning	18,586	47.19%
Write-in	199	0.51%
Total votes	39,386	100.00%

== District 7 ==
District 7
- November 7, 2023
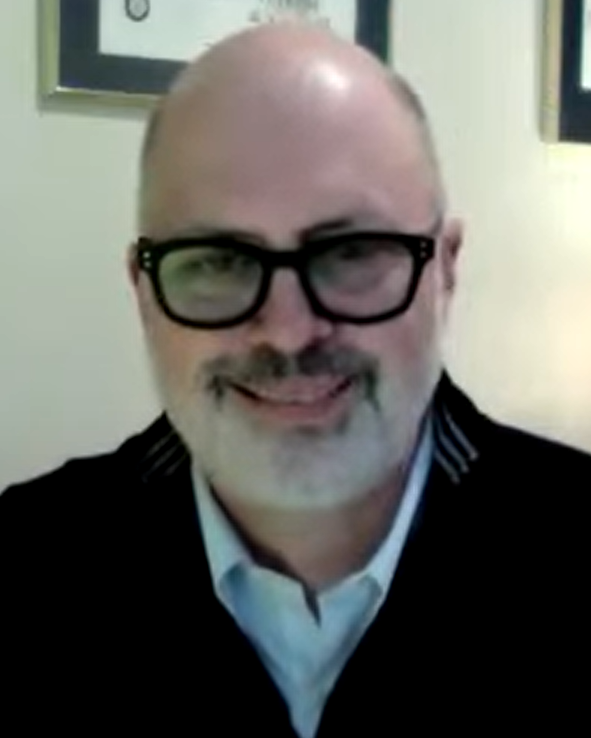

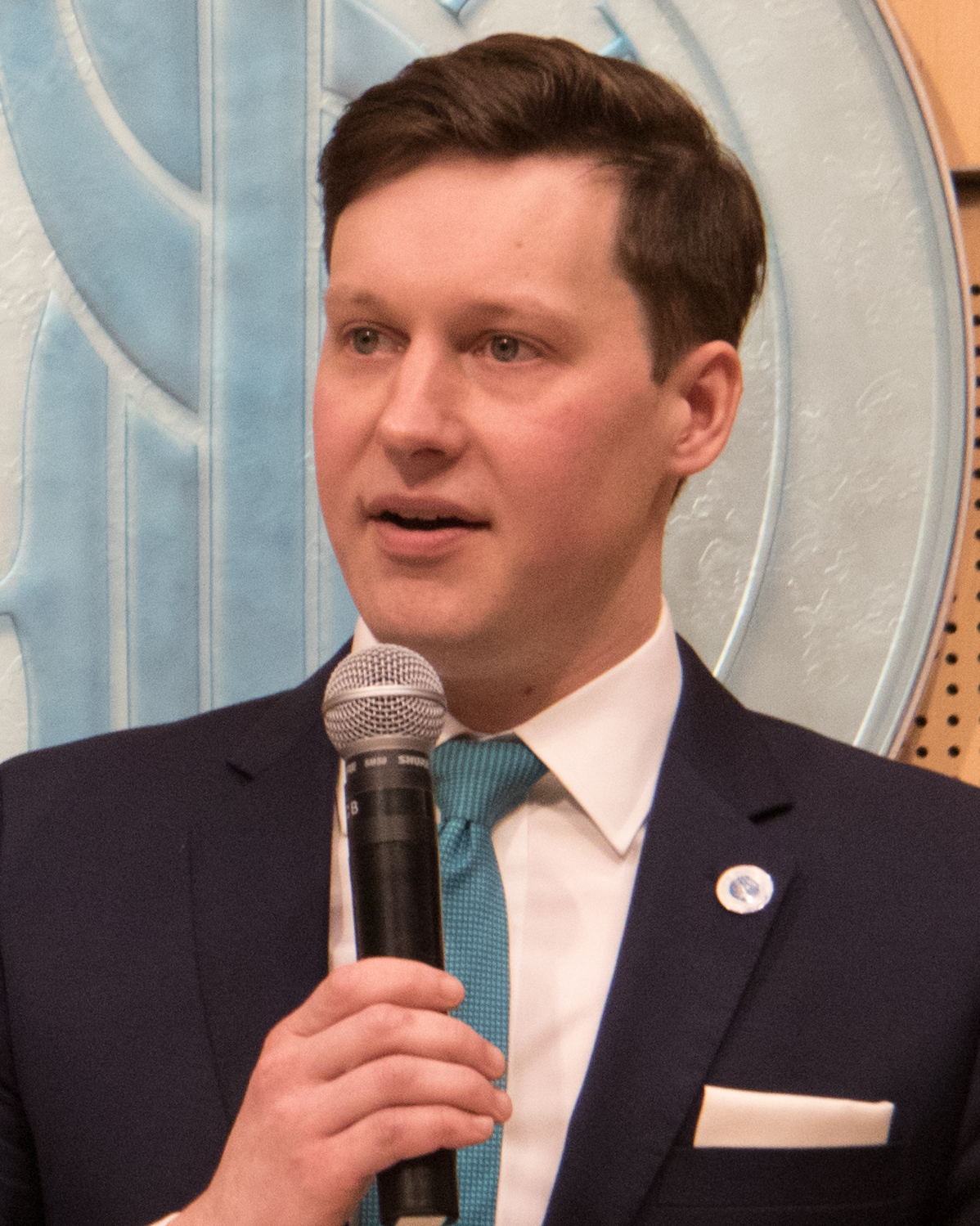
Candidate	Bob Kettle	Andrew J. Lewis
Popular vote	11,951	11,512
Percentage	50.78%	48.91%
- Precinct results Kettle: 50–60% 60–70% 70–80% >90% Lewis: 50–60% 60–70% 70–80% Tie: 40–50%
Councilor before election
Andrew J. Lewis
Democratic
Elected Councilor
Bob Kettle
Democratic

=== Campaign ===
Incumbent Andrew J. Lewis announced that he would run for reelection on January 15, 2023, the first incumbent councilor to do so. He was challenged by Isabelle Kerner, who ran for this district in 2019, Queen Anne community councilmember Robert Kettle, Seattle Police Officer Aaron Marshall, businesswoman Olga Sagan and Wade Sowders.

=== Campaign finance ===
All the candidates besides Marshall participated in the democracy voucher program.

Candidate	Campaign committee			
Candidate	Raised	Spent	COH	L&D
Isabelle Kerner	$1,694.32	$1,657.13	$37.19	$0.00
Robert Kettle	$65,701.39	$50,650.84	$15,050.55	$12,924.03
Andrew Lewis	$93,762.09	$86,974.79	$6,787.30	$0.00
Aaron Marshall	$26,680.71	$15,465.23	$11,215.48	$7,500.00
Olga Sagan	$59,608.15	$53,756.12	$5,852.03	$16,877.09
Wade Sowders	$1,672.34	$1,672.34	$0.00	$0.00

=== Endorsements ===
Robert Kettle

Local officials

- Debora Juarez, member of the Seattle City Council
- Sara Nelson, member of the Seattle City Council
- Alex Pedersen, member of the Seattle City Council

Newspapers

- The Seattle Times
Andrew J. Lewis

Federal officials

- Robert Reich, former United States Secretary of Labor
- Pramila Jayapal, U.S. representative from Washington's 7th congressional district

State officials

- Bob Ferguson, Attorney General of Washington

Local officials

- Dow Constantine, King County Executive
- Lisa Herbold, member of the Seattle City Council
- Teresa Mosqueda, member of the Seattle City Council

Organizations

- Washington's 43rd legislative district Democrats

Newspapers

- The Stranger

Labor unions

- SEIU Local 925
- UFCW Local 3000

=== Primary results ===
2023 Seattle City Council District 7 primary
Candidate	Votes	%
Andrew J. Lewis (incumbent)	8,114	43.45%
Bob Kettle	5,888	31.53%
Olga Sagan	2,429	13.01%
Aaron Marshall	1,372	7.35%
Isabelle Kerner	502	2.69%
Wade Sowders	323	1.73%
Write-in	46	0.25%
Total votes	18,674	100.00%

=== General election debate ===
2023 Seattle City Council District 7 general election debate
No.	Date	Host	Moderator	Nonpartisan	Nonpartisan
Key: P Participant A Absent N Not invited I Invited W Withdrawn					
Key: P Participant A Absent N Not invited I Invited W Withdrawn				Andrew J. Lewis	Bob Kettle
1	Oct. 13, 2023	Seattle Channel	Brian Callanan	P	P

=== General election results ===
2021 Seattle City Council District 7
Candidate	Votes	%
Bob Kettle	11,951	50.78%
Andrew J. Lewis (incumbent)	11,512	48.91%
Write-in	74	0.31%
Total votes	23,537	100.00%

== Notes ==
Partisan clients

== Works cited ==
- August 1, 2023 Primary and Special Election King County Official Local Voters' Pamphlet. King County, Washington. 2023. Archived from the original on August 4, 2023.
- 2023 Seattle City Council primary election results (PDF). King County, Washington. 2023.
- 2023 Seattle City Council general election results (PDF). King County, Washington. 2023.
