= 2026 Seattle City Council 5th district special election =

- November 3, 2026
Candidate
Nilu Jenks
Julie Kang
Incumbent Councilor
Debora Juarez
Democratic

The 2026 Seattle City Council 5th district special election was held on November 3, 2026, following a primary election on August 4. The election will occur to fill a vacancy for the 5th district due to the resignation of Cathy Moore, who resigned for health and personal reasons. Moore's predecessor, Debora Juarez, was appointed to the seat in July 2025 by the City Council. She is not running for re-election to a full term in office.

== Primary election ==
=== Candidates ===
==== Declared ====
- Dimitri Georgakopoulos, real estate broker
- Silas James, former chair of the Seattle Disability Commission
- Nilu Jenks, political and partnerships director at FairVote Washington and candidate for this district in 2023
- Julie Kang, co-chair of the King County Immigrant and Refugee Commission

==== Declined ====
- Debora Juarez, incumbent city council member (2016–2024; 2025–present) and former president of the Seattle City Council (2022–2024)

=== Endorsements ===
Nilu Jenks

State legislators

- Liz Berry, state representative from the 36th district (2021–present)
- Darya Farivar, state representative from the 46th district (2023–present)
- Nicole Macri, state representative from the 43rd district (2017–present)
- Julia Reed, state representative from the 36th district (2023–present)
- Rebecca Saldaña, state senator from the 37th district (2016–present)
- Brianna Thomas, state representative from the 34th district (2025–present)

Local officials

- Toshiko Hasegawa, Port of Seattle commissioner from the 4th position (2022–present)
- Alexis Mercedes Rinck, Seattle City Council member from the 8th position (2024–present)
- Jim Street, former Seattle City Council president (1994–1996) from the 7th position (1984–1996) and former King County Superior Court judge (1996–2000)

Organizations

- King County Democratic Party

Newspapers

- The Stranger
- The Urbanist
Julie Kang

Local officials

- Tanya Woo, former Seattle City Council member from the 8th position (2024)

Newspapers

- The Seattle Times

=== Results ===
2025 Seattle City Council 5th district special primary election
Candidate	Votes	%
Nilu Jenks	16,287	53.95%
Julie Kang	9,956	32.98%
Dimitri Georgakopoulos	2,423	8.03%
Silas James	1,451	4.81%
Write-in	74	0.25%
Total votes	30,191	100.00%

== General election ==
=== Results ===
2025 Seattle City Council 5th district special general election
Candidate	Votes	%
Nilu Jenks		
Julie Kang		
Write-in		
Total votes		100.00%
