= Chloe Asaam =

Ghanaian fashion designer

- Born: Kumasi, Ghana
- Education: Radford University College (BA)
- Occupation: Fashion designer
- Known for: Design, Textile waste activism, Social Impact

Chloe Asaam is a fashion designer and sustainable growth strategist.

== Early life ==
She is from Kumasi and received a bachelor's degree in fashion/apparel design from Radford University College in 2017.

== Career ==
She helps founders, creatives and small teams to navigate growth.

In design, she focuses on sustainable and handmade garments that capture regional context alongside larger fashion trends. Each piece is a statement on purpose that integrates QR codes that unlock cultural histories. She designs with upcycled textiles. She was highlighted by the Mercedes-Benz Fashion Week Tbilisi, Mercedes Benz Fashion Week Accra, and The Fashion Atlas.

== Filmography ==
- Buy Now! The Shopping Conspiracy (2024) - Self
