= Rob Saka =

American politician

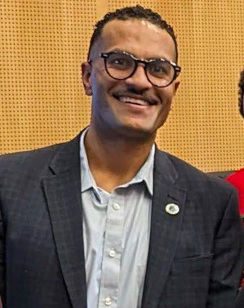
- Rob Saka, 2024

Member of the Seattle City Council from District 1
- Incumbent
- Assumed office January 1, 2024
- Preceded by: Lisa Herbold

Personal details
- Born: Robert Paul Olajide Saka; January 21, 1983 (age 43) Minneapolis, Minnesota
- Party: Democratic
- Spouse: Alicia Saka
- Education: University of Washington (BA); University of California, Hastings (JD)

Rob Saka (born January 21, 1983) is an American lawyer and politician elected to represent District 1 of the Seattle City Council, which encompasses all of West Seattle.

== Biography ==
Saka was born in Minneapolis, Minnesota and grew up in the foster care system before his Nigerian immigrant father "rescued" him and began raising him as a single father. He grew up in with financial hardships, living in public and low-income housing. After high school, Saka joined the United States Air Force and served for ten years as an intelligence officer.

Saka graduated from the University of Washington, then the Hastings Law School, where he earned his Doctor of Jurisprudence degree. After law school, he moved back to Seattle in the Delridge neighborhood, where he currently resides. Saka was hired by Microsoft as a product attorney before joining Meta Platforms as an associate general counsel.

Before his city council run, Saka was appointed to several city and county commissions, including the King County Charter Review Commission, the King County Redistricting Commission, and a Seattle Police Chief search committee.

== Seattle city council ==
=== Election ===
In February 2023, Saka announced that he would stand for the city council, replacing Lisa Herbold who declined to run for re-election. He said that his campaign aligned more with District 1, compared to Herbold's progressive policies. Saka's platform focused on public safety and police reform, rejecting many of the policies championed by the city council at the time. In the August primary, Saka came in second, with 24% of the vote. Former Amazon worker and climate activist Maren Costa coming in first, with 33%. Costa was fired from Amazon in 2020 after publicly urging the company to do more to combat climate change and improve conditions for warehouse workers. After the primary, the six other candidates endorsed Costa over Saka despite wide policy differences, saying "She has experience fighting for justice and a better world".

Saka and Costa had some similar policy proposals regarding public safety and hiring more police. However, Saka accused Costa of flip-flopping on "defunding the police" when she stated her support for hiring additional police. Costa did not support legislation passed by the city council to prosecute low-level drug offenses, while Saka urged the council to pass the legislation, calling it a "powerful tool". Saka promoted sweeps of homeless encampments as another tool for the city to use to address homelessness and crime, while Costa openly rejected the sweeping policy under Mayor Bruce Harrell.

In the November general election, Saka defeated Costa 54% to 45%.

=== Tenure ===
Once sworn in, Saka became chair of the Transportation Committee, stating he became the "king of potholes". As chair, Saka proposed a $1.55 billion transportation levy, larger than the $1.35 billion levy proposed by Harrell, which would add an average of $41 for taxpayers. Saka added in additional projects, including sidewalks, safe routes to schools, and safety on public transit, electric charging stations, a freight program, and a ‘district project fund.’ The council would unanimously pass the legislation and put it on the November 2024 ballot for voters to approve.

While on the council, Saka supported hiring additional police, stating, "The public safety challenges that we're experiencing today are a shameful legacy of the defund the police movement. And that was wrong then. It's wrong now. Defund is Dead." As a member of the Council's Public Safety Committee, he voted for a bill that would repeal the city's ban on police use of blast balls for crowd control. During an earlier visit to a firing range where he saw a blast ball demonstrated, he asked to have a blast ball used on him directly, saying “I made the request, and the executive declined my request.”

In office, Saka has courted criticism for his efforts to force the Seattle Department of Transportation to revise the RapidRide H Line bus rapid transit project in the Seattle neighborhood of Delridge. In October 2024, Saka attempted to dedicate $2 million in the city budget to remove a safety median that prevents drivers on Delridge Way SW from turning left into a preschool that Saka's children attend. Saka compared the 8-inch tall median to President Donald Trump's attempts to build border walls on the U.S.-Mexico border.

Saka's May 2025 approval rating was negative, with 13% approving of his job performance, 40% disapproving, and 47% unsure.

In July 2025, during the appointment process to fill the vacant position after Cathy Moore, finalist Nilu Jenks said that no one on the City Council had "lived experience from Asian, refugee, Muslim or Middle Eastern communities." Saka said that the Council had immigrant and Muslim represenatation on because he was the son of a immigrant and the grandson of a Muslim. In response, local Muslim and Middle Eastern/North African sent a letter to Saka demanding a public apology for his comments.

== Personal life ==
Saka resides in the Delridge neighborhood with his wife and three children. His wife is an environmental manager for Starbucks.
