= Andrew J. Lewis =

Andrew J. Lewis may refer to:

- Andrew J. Lewis (comics), British writer
- Andrew J. Lewis (politician) (born 1989/1990), American politician
