= Nilu Jenks =

American politician (born 1979)

- Jenks in 2023

Member-elect of Seattle City Council from the 5th district
- Preceded by: Debora Juarez

Personal details
- Born: January 1979 (age 47) Oklahoma
- Children: 2
- Education: Wellesley College (BA)

Nilu Jenks (born 1979) is an Iranian-American political activist and the council member-elect for the Seattle City Council District 5 position.

== Early life and education ==
Jenks was born in Oklahoma in January 1979. Her parents immigrated from Iran to study in the United States before the Iranian revolution, eventually becoming citizens through Ronald Reagan's 1986 immigration reforms. She attended Wellesley College where she earned a Bachelor of Arts in Economics and Spanish.

== Career ==
Jenks served as a board member of Roosevelt Alumni for Racial Equity (RARE) and as a PTA advocacy chair at John Rogers Elementary School. Most recently she has worked as the political and partnerships director at FairVote Washington. Jenks has also participated in community organization programs such as the partnership between Gun by Gun and San Mateo County, California in the wake of the 2018 Parkland shootings.

== Seattle City Council Elections ==
=== Elections ===
Jenks ran for the District 5 position in the Seattle City Council in 2023 but came third in the primaries behind Cathy Moore and CrisTiana ObeySumner. In June of 2025, Cathy Moore announced that she was stepping down from her position. Former President of Seattle City Council, Debora Juarez was appointed to fill the District 5 seat. A special election was held in 2026, where Jenks received 58.5% of the vote in the November 3 general election vote count, compared to the 41.1% received by her opponent Julie Kang.

=== Key positions ===
Jenks emphasized street safety, cost of living, and stopping Trumpism in her campaign. Jenks opposes use of CCTV cameras on District 5's Aurora Avenue, citing concerns about immigration enforcement and threats to civil liberties. She opposes Seattle's SOAP (Stay Out of Areas of Prostitution) ordinances, stating that programs such as the Community Assisted Response and Engagement (CARE) Department and undercover police operations are more effective. She also hopes to address public safety crises by expanding behavioral health services such as Downtown Emergency Service Center's ORCA (Opiod Recovery & Care Access) center.

Her win is expected to shift the balance of power on the council away from centrism and toward progressivism.

=== Endorsements ===
Jenks was endorsed by The Urbanist Elections Committee, The Stranger, and the King County Democratic Party.

== Personal Life ==
Jenks lives in Lake City with her husband and two teenagers.
