= Buy Now! The Shopping Conspiracy =

- Directed by: Nic Stacey
- Written by: Nic Stacey
- Produced by: Flora Bagenal
- Starring: Eric Liedtke; Maren Costa; Roger Lee; Paul Polman
- Cinematography: Brendan McGinty
- Music by: David Schweitzer
- Release date: 20 November 2024
- Running time: 84 minutes
- Language: English

Buy Now! The Shopping Conspiracy is a 2024 British documentary film written and directed by Nic Stacey and produced by Flora Bagenal. It was released on Netflix on 20 November 2024. It focuses on issues such as consumerism and overproduction. The VFX and animation in the film were nominated for an Emmy and created by London Studio Compost Creative.

== Cast ==
- Eric Liedtke, former Adidas Brand President.
- Roger Lee
- Maren Costa, advocate for climate justice, workers’ rights, and corporate responsibility.
- Mara Einstein
- Paul Polman, former CEO of the consumer goods company Unilever.
- Nirav Patel, co-founder of Framework Computer, a easily-repairable laptop and computer.
- Kyle Wiens, founder of iFixit, an online repair guide of consumer electronics and gadgets and seller of repair parts, tools, and accessories.
- Anna Sacks
- Jan Dell
- Jim Puckett
- Chloe Asaam, a fashion designer and sustainable growth strategist.
- Maria Bartiromo, an American conservative journalist and author.

== Release ==
It was released on 20 November 2024 on Netflix streaming.

== Reception ==
Time called the film "a powerful reminder to customers ahead of the Black Friday shopping bonanza that landfills and waste sites around the world are filling up with unwanted clothes, tech, and household goods."

The importance of the topic addressed was noted in various reviews.
