= Maren Costa =

American user experience designer

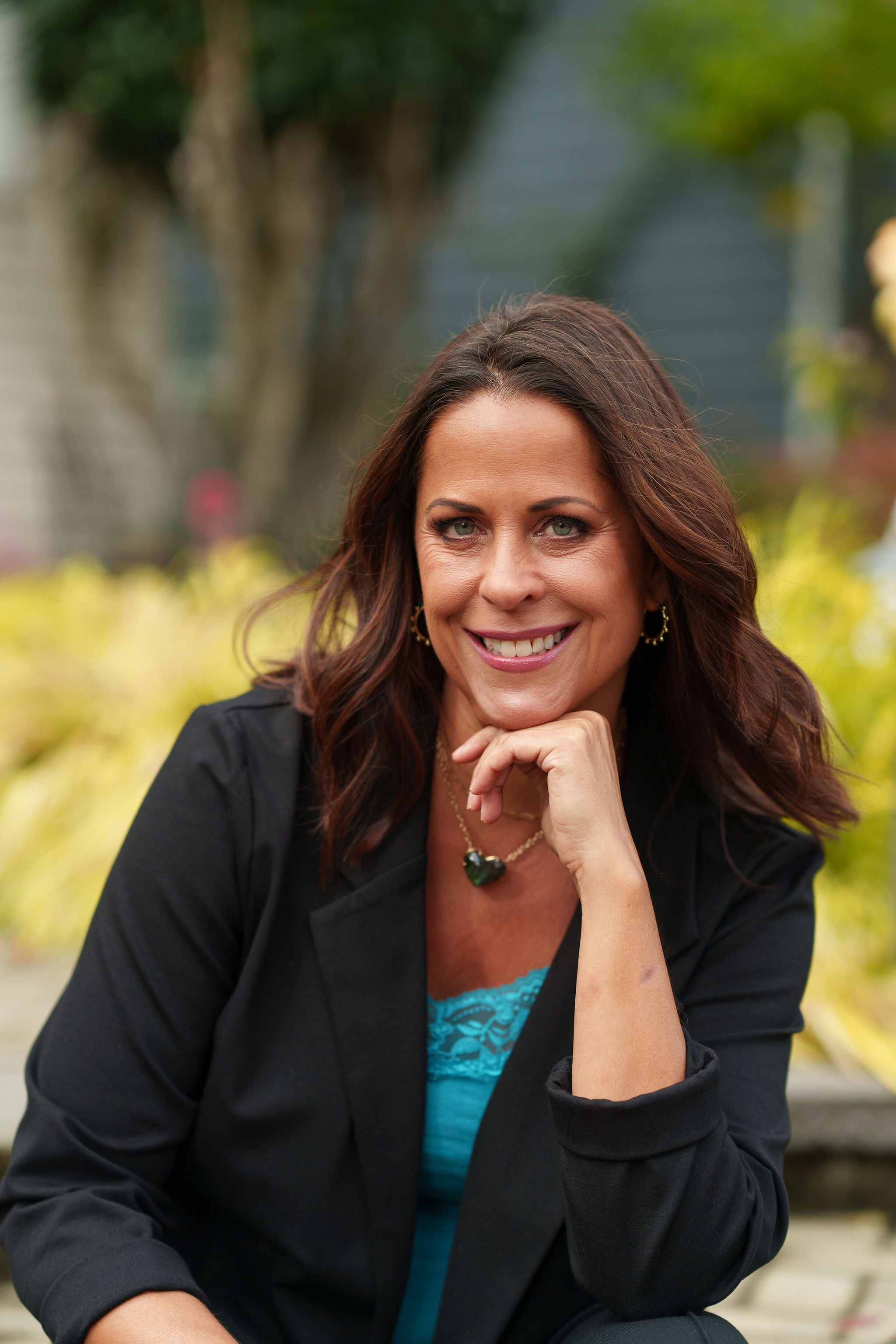
- Occupations: Tech worker organizer, climate justice advocate, speaker
- Known for: Climate justice, workers’ rights, and corporate, responsibility advocacy
- Notable work: Amazon Employees For Climate Justice

Maren Costa is a prominent American advocate for climate justice, workers’ rights, and corporate responsibility, best known for co-founding Amazon Employees For Climate Justice and being illegally terminated by Amazon for so-called "policy violations" tied to her activism. Costa was also featured in the 2024 Netflix documentary Buy Now! The Shopping Conspiracy.

== Education ==
Costa has Bachelor of Arts degree in English and Women's Studies (with concentrations in Ecofeminism and French) from St. Olaf College.

She also completed a Certificate of User Centered Design from the University of Washington.

== Career and activism ==
Costa joined Amazon in 2002 as a Senior User Experience Designer at the Seattle headquarters. She was promoted to Principal in 2006, and was the first Designer to reach that level at Amazon. Costa said it was exciting to be at Amazon in the early years, but described the culture as "intense" with a heavy rate of corporate employee turnover due to excessive firings. Costa has publicly discussed the toxic workplace culture at Amazon, even recalling that her therapist once asked if she was part of a social experiment due to the extreme levels of gaslighting and internal politics. After having two children, she found the culture incompatible with parenting and left Amazon in 2011. She returned in 2013.

Toward the end of 2018, Costa joined fellow designer Emily Cunningham and other Amazon employees, in launching a climate change initiative within Amazon, including a shareholder resolution demanding stronger climate commitments.

In early 2019, Amazon executives met with Costa, Cunningham, and other members of their newly formed group, Amazon Employees for Climate Justice (AECJ), and asked them to withdraw their shareholder resolution. The employees refused.

In September 2019, Costa was one of the leaders in organizing over 3,000 Amazon employees to join the Global Climate Strike. She spoke in front of thousands at Seattle City Hall, calling out Amazon's inadequate climate policies. Following this action, Amazon warned her that she had violated its policies regarding external communications and that further violations could lead to termination. Anticipating the company's retaliation, AECJ organized 400 Amazon employees to voluntarily break the external communications policy, effectively giving Amazon a choice: You can fire Maren and Emily and 400 employees, or fire no one.

On April 11, 2020, Costa was illegally terminated by Amazon after she had amplified an initiative led by Amazon warehouse workers who were raising warehouse serious safety concerns during the COVID-19 pandemic. Costa publicly supported Amazon warehouse workers in their demands for better protections and tweeted that she would match donations to warehouse workers in Amazonians United.

Costa filed a charge with the National Labor Relations Board (NLRB) and the agency found that Costa's firing was unlawful. While Amazon did not admit wrongdoing, the company agreed to a settlement covering lost wages and was required to post notices company-wide affirming employees' right to organize.

In 2021, Costa announced on LinkedIn that she was joining Microsoft as Principal Lead Designer, where she continued to advocate for climate justice and organize her colleagues for collective action.

Costa has nine patents pending.

=== City council campaign ===
Costa announced her candidacy for the Seattle City Council's District 1 seat ahead of the 2023 election. She won the primary election by a wide margin, and remarkably earned the endorsements of all seven opponents who had not advanced to the general election. However, in the general election, Costa was defeated by Rob Saka, who secured 54.35% of the vote to her 45.21%, with significant financial support from corporate PACs and Seattle's business elite.

Following the election, Costa joined WorkForClimate.org, where she continues to advocate for climate justice and corporate accountability.

== Personal life ==
Costa lives in Seattle, Washington. She is divorced and has two children. She has an identical twin sister and an older sister, both of whom also reside in Seattle.

== Filmography ==
- Buy Now! The Shopping Conspiracy (2024) - Self

== See also ==
- Abigail Borah
- Nicole Hernandez Hammer
- Julia Butterfly Hill
