= Debora Juarez =

American politician

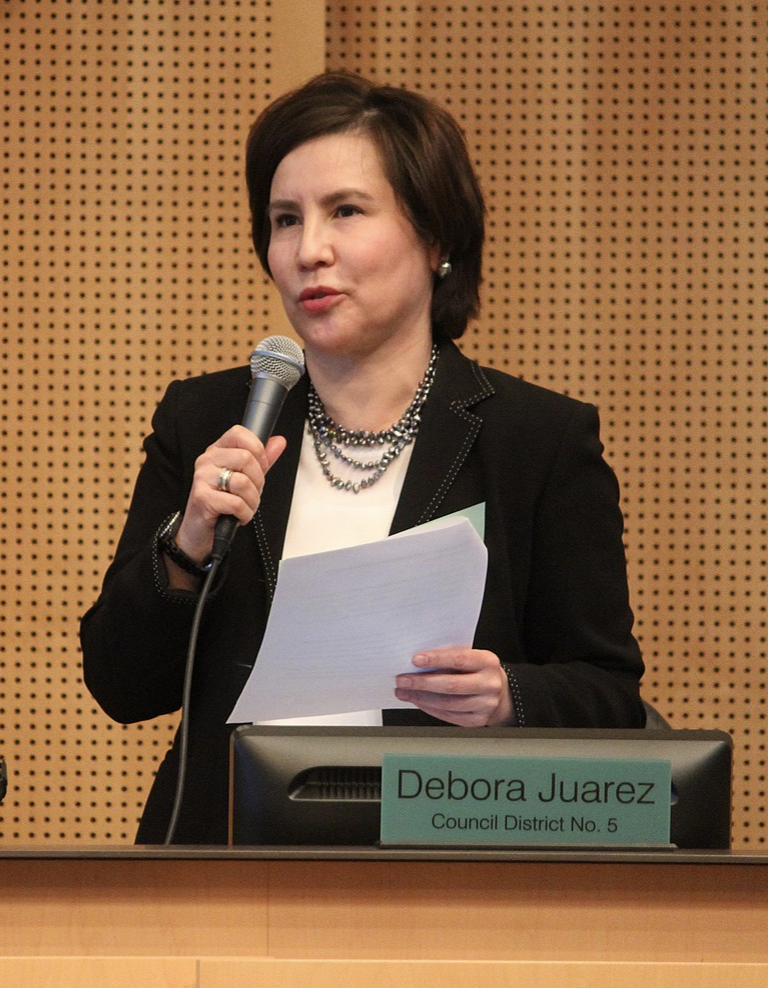
- Juarez in 2016

President of the Seattle City Council
- In office January 4, 2022 – January 2, 2024
- Preceded by: Lorena González
- Succeeded by: Sara Nelson

Member of the Seattle City Council from District 5
- Incumbent
- Assumed office July 28, 2025
- Preceded by: Cathy Moore
- Succeeded by: Nilu Jenks
- In office January 4, 2016 – January 2, 2024
- Preceded by: Constituency established
- Succeeded by: Cathy Moore

Personal details
- Party: Democratic
- Education: Western Washington University (BA); Seattle University (JD)
- Occupation: Attorney

Debora Juarez is an American lawyer and politician who served as the president of the Seattle City Council. She was first elected in 2015 to represent the 5th district. A member of the Blackfeet Nation, she was the first Native American person elected to the council.

== Early life and education ==
Juarez is an enrolled member of the Blackfeet Nation. She grew up on the Puyallup Reservation in Tacoma, Washington with her five siblings. Her mother was Native American and her father was a first-generation Mexican-American.

Juarez was the first member of her family to attend college. She earned an undergraduate degree at Western Washington University and then a JD from Seattle University School of Law.

== Career ==
Juarez began working as a public defender while attending law school at night. She spent five years as a public defender and then worked as an attorney for the Native American Project. She served two years as a King County Superior Court and City of Seattle Municipal Court pro-tem judge, and was the executive director of the Governor's Office of Indian Affairs under Mike Lowry and Gary Locke.

== Seattle City Council ==
=== Elections ===
In 2013, Seattle voters approved changing seven of the nine at-large district seats to district-based starting in 2015. In 2015, Juarez ran for the district 5 position, which represents North Seattle and had no incumbent council member. In the August primary, Juarez came in first against seven challengers, with 39.25%, and advanced to the general election with ex-clergy member Sandy Brown, who earned 19.88% of the vote.

A key focus of the general election was increasing the number of sidewalks in the district, which had the highest density of streets without sidewalks. Brown ran on creating local improvement districts to pay for sidewalks, which Juarez criticised saying that they would unfairly benefit wealthy neighborhoods. Juarez supported imposing developer impact fees as well as pushing for greater funding for sidewalks in SDOT's budget. In the November general election, Juarez defeated Brown, 64% to 35%.

Juarez ran for reelection in 2019 and faced five challengers in the primary. In the August primary, Juarez came in first with 45.1% of the vote and advanced to the general election with lawyer Ann Davison Sattler, who earned 26.71%. In the general election, Juaez focused her campaign on major projects she brought to the district, including the NHL training facility and a future light rail station. She and Davison Sattler sparred on homelessness, with Juarez focusing on increasing funding and affordable housing, while Davison Sattler focused on housing up to 2,000 homeless people into abandoned warehouses while not increasing funding for homelessness services.

In the general election, Juarez defeated Davison Sattler, 60.59% to 39.05%.

=== Tenure ===
Juarez was the first Indigenous person to serve as a Seattle City Council member, and later the first Indigenous Council President. She was sworn in by her two daughters and a niece on Monday, January 4, 2016. Near the end of her first year in office, Crosscut.com described Juarez as a "wildcard council member" for her voting record and manner of "speaking more bluntly than most politicians would".

As a council member, Juarez is well-known for focusing on her district and advocating for major capital projects, including the Northgate Pedestrian and Bicycle Bridge over Interstate 5 and a controversial police station in her district. She lobbied Sound Transit to add the Northeast 130th station on the Link light rail system to their 2016 ballot measure, which was passed. After members of the council were criticized for a 2016 vote against a street vacation necessary for a new arena to be built in the SoDo area, Juarez took a lead in the redevelopment of the Seattle Center Arena and was appointed chair of the Select Committee on Civic Arenas. In September 2018, the council unanimously approved a renovation of the arena with plans to attract an National Hockey League team to the city.

On December 12, 2022 Juarez announced that she would not seek re-election in 2023. After leaving the council, Juarez was later appointed to the District 5 seat again in July 2025 to serve Cathy Moore's term after her resignation until a special election could be held to fill the vacancy. During this period on the council she was a harsh critic of Seattle mayor Katie Wilson, especially in the area of public safety. In November 2026 progressive political activist Nilu Jenks won the special election to replace Juarez on the council.

== Personal life ==
Juarez lives in the Pinehurst neighborhood of Seattle.

In 2012, Juarez pleaded guilty to driving under the influence after crashing her car in Seattle's Northgate neighborhood.

== Electoral history ==
=== 2015 election ===
Seattle City Council District 5, Primary Election 2015
Party	Candidate	Votes	%
Nonpartisan	Debora Juarez	6,635	39.25%
Nonpartisan	Sandy Brown	3,360	19.88%
Nonpartisan	Halei Watkins	2,431	14.38%
Nonpartisan	Kris Lethin	1,307	7.73%
Nonpartisan	Mercedes Elizalde	985	5.83%
Nonpartisan	Debadutta Dash	968	5.73%
Nonpartisan	David Toledo	959	5.67%
Nonpartisan	Hugh H. Russell	231	1.37%
Nonpartisan	Write-in	27	0.16%
Turnout		17,224	29.72%
Registered electors		57,959	

Seattle City Council District 5, General Election 2015
Party	Candidate	Votes	%
Nonpartisan	Debora Juarez	15,058	64.33%
Nonpartisan	Sandy Brown	8,224	35.13%
Nonpartisan	Write-in	126	0.54%
Majority		6,834	29.20%
Turnout		26,301	45.06%
Registered electors		58,372	

=== 2019 election ===
Seattle City Council District 5, Primary Election 2019
Party	Candidate	Votes	%
Nonpartisan	Debora Juarez	11,085	45.10%
Nonpartisan	Ann Davidson Sattler	6,564	26.71%
Nonpartisan	John Lombard	3,201	13.02%
Nonpartisan	Tayla Mahoney	1,742	7.09%
Nonpartisan	Mark Mendez	1,558	6.34%
Nonpartisan	Alex Tsimerman	376	1.53%
Nonpartisan	Write-in	50	0.2%
Turnout		25,762	40.32%
Registered electors		63,892	

Seattle City Council District 5, General Election 2019
Party	Candidate	Votes	%
Nonpartisan	Debora Juarez	19,532	60.59%
Nonpartisan	Ann Davison Sattler	12,588	39.05%
Nonpartisan	Write-in	114	0.35%
Turnout		34,192	53.35%
Registered electors		64,094	

== See also ==
- List of Native American politicians
- Native American women in politics
