= Bob Kettle =

American politician

Robert Kettle
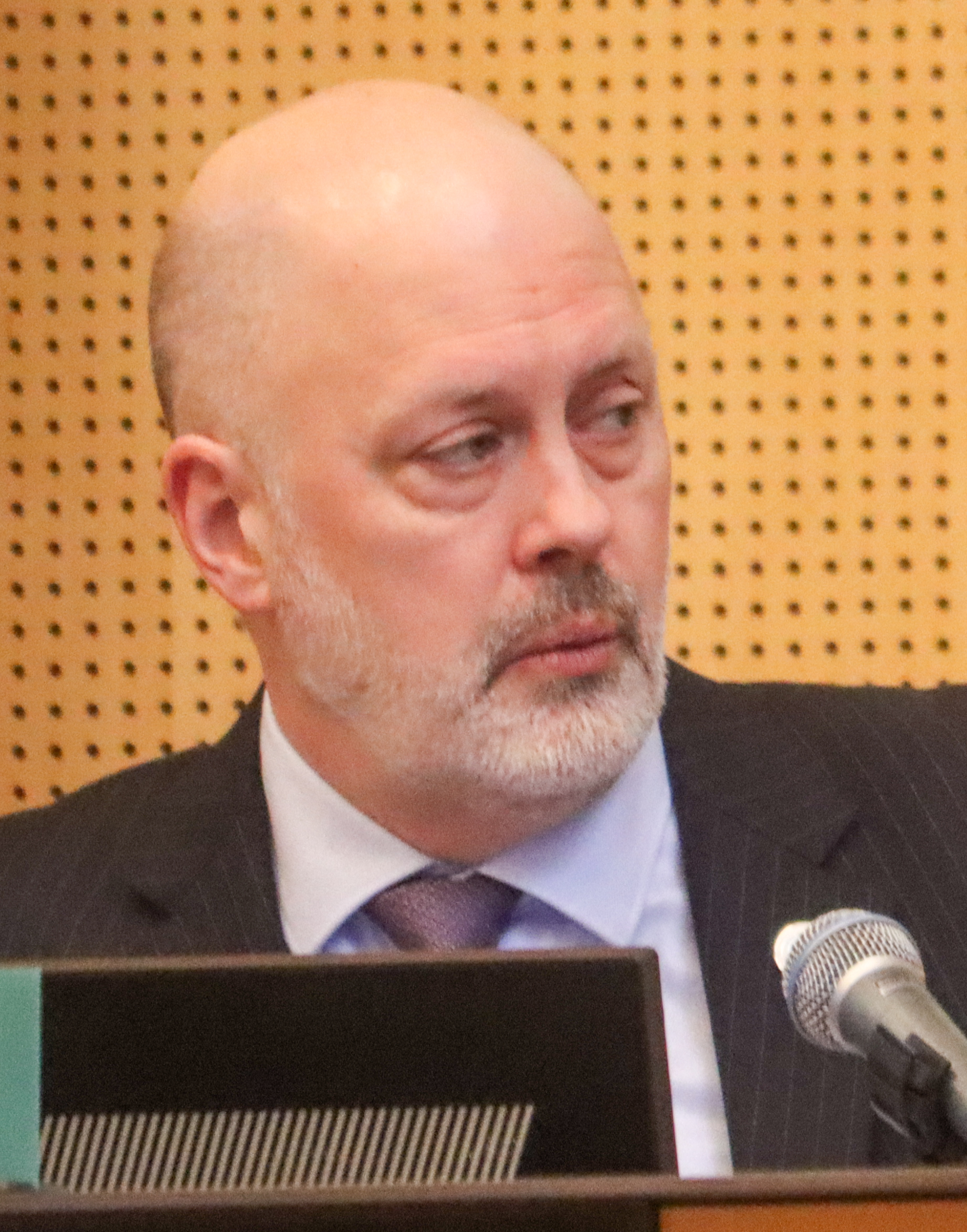
- Kettle in 2024

Member of the Seattle City Council from the 7th district
- Incumbent
- Assumed office January 1, 2024
- Preceded by: Andrew J. Lewis

Personal details
- Born: New York
- Party: Democratic
- Spouse: Sarah Dunne
- Education: Boston University (BA); Georgetown University (MA); University of Washington (MPA)

Robert Edward Kettle (born c. 1965-1966), usually referred to as Bob Kettle, is an American veteran and politician elected to represent District 7 of the Seattle City Council.

== Early life ==
Kettle was born in Le Roy, New York to a working class family. He graduated from Boston University and received a master’s in national security studies from Georgetown University. Kettle also graduated from the United States Army Command and General Staff College.

== Career ==
=== United States Navy ===
Kettle joined the United States Navy and served with them for 22 years. He was a naval intelligence officer and reached the rank of commander. At one point Kettle served in a CIA and Defense Intelligence Agency unit overseeing the Camp Cropper detention site in Baghdad, Iraq.

=== Queen Anne Community Council board ===
Kettle was active in the Queen Anne community as a member of the Queen Anne Community Council board and chair of its public safety board. He was also a member of the West Precinct Advisory Council, the Queen Anne Block Watch Network, and the Seattle chapter of the World Affairs Council.

=== Seattle city council ===
==== 2023 election ====
Kettle ran for city council in 2023 against incumbent Andrew J. Lewis. There were four other challengers in the race, which included Piroshky Piroshky owner Olga Sagan. In the August primary, Lewis and Kettle advanced to the general election, with 43% and 31% of the vote respectively.

Kettle was labeled a "centrist" and a "moderate" with the focus of his campaign being public safety and addressing rising crime in the city. He blamed Lewis and the council for the "permissive environment" that had been created through their policies, including support for a 50% cut to the Seattle Police Department. Kettle supported hiring more police officers, cracking down on public drug use, and alternative responses to police. Lewis would state that his support for defunding the police was "a mistake" and that he backed Mayor Bruce Harrell plan to recruit more officers.

Kettle received backing from business and real estate lobbyists, including the National Association of Realtors, as well as some Republicans, like city attorney Ann Davison and former Sacramento Kings basketball player Spencer Hawes.

In the general election, Kettle won with 50.78% to Lewis' 48.91%.

==== Tenure ====
Kettle was first elected to a council with a majority of moderates, a switch to the previous progressive city council. In his first term, he was appointed chair of the Public Safety Committee, and released his "6 pillars" to address public safety in the city which included, hiring more police, additional legal tools, and collaboration between different government entities. Kettle supported various bills to increase police officer hiring, including changing the police test to have a larger candidate pool.

In conjunction with council member Cathy Moore Stay out of Areas of Prostitution (SOAP) legislation, Kettle sponsored a bill to create Stay out of Drug Areas (SODA) zones. The bill originally created two areas, one in Downtown Seattle and the other in Little Saigon, that would exclude people with previous drug related charges from those areas with enhanced trespassing orders. In committee meetings, citizens were vocally opposed to the legislation, and people were removed from the meeting after causing a disturbance after the public comment period abruptly ended. Both the SODA and SOAP bills passed out of committee, with amendments adding additional SODA zones. At the full council, the public comment was extended to accommodate the more than 100 people who signed up to give testimony and the bills were both passed on a 8-1 vote.

In 2025, Kettle voted for a bill to repeal the city's ban on police use of blast balls, adding an amendment to restrict their use until approved by an on-scene commander. During the meeting on repealing the ban, he attributed the abuse of prisoners at the Abu Ghraib prison to "under deployment" of personnel, saying, "As you know, in detention prisons, at Abu Ghraib, a lot of bad things happened because of the under deployment."

== Personal life ==
After retiring from the Navy, Kettle married Sarah Anne Dunne on July 6, 2012. Kettle and his family moved to the Queen Anne neighborhood in Seattle where they live today.
