= Radford University College =

Private university in Ghana

Coordinates: 5.640472°N 0.163528°W

- Motto: Determination, Endurance and Achievement
- Type: Private
- Established: 2009
- Founders: Nana Worae Wiredu
- President: Dr. Paul Effah

Radford University College is a private university in East Legon, Accra, Ghana. It is affiliated with Kwame Nkrumah University of Science and Technology, and was most recently accredited in 2019 by the Ghana Tertiary Education Commission.

== Faculties ==
Faculty of Allied Health
Faculty of Business Science
Faculty of Fine Arts
Faculty of Applied Sciences

== Departments & programmes ==
=== Department of Business Administration ===
B.Sc. Business Administration

- Human Resource Management
- Marketing
- Entrepreneurship Development
- Accounting
- Banking & Finance

=== Department of Information Communication Technology ===
BSc Information Communication Technology

- Database Management
- Computer Networking
- System Analysis
- Web Development
- Computer Security

=== Department of Applied Science (Geology & Environmental Science) ===
- Applied Geophysics
- Environmental Geosciences
- Gemmology and Related Industries
- Geo-park Development and Management
- Geology and Earth Science Education
- Mining and Project Management
- Medical Geology
- Petroleum, Hydrogeology and Related Industries

== See also ==
- List of universities in Ghana
