= Lisa Herbold =

American politician (born 1967)

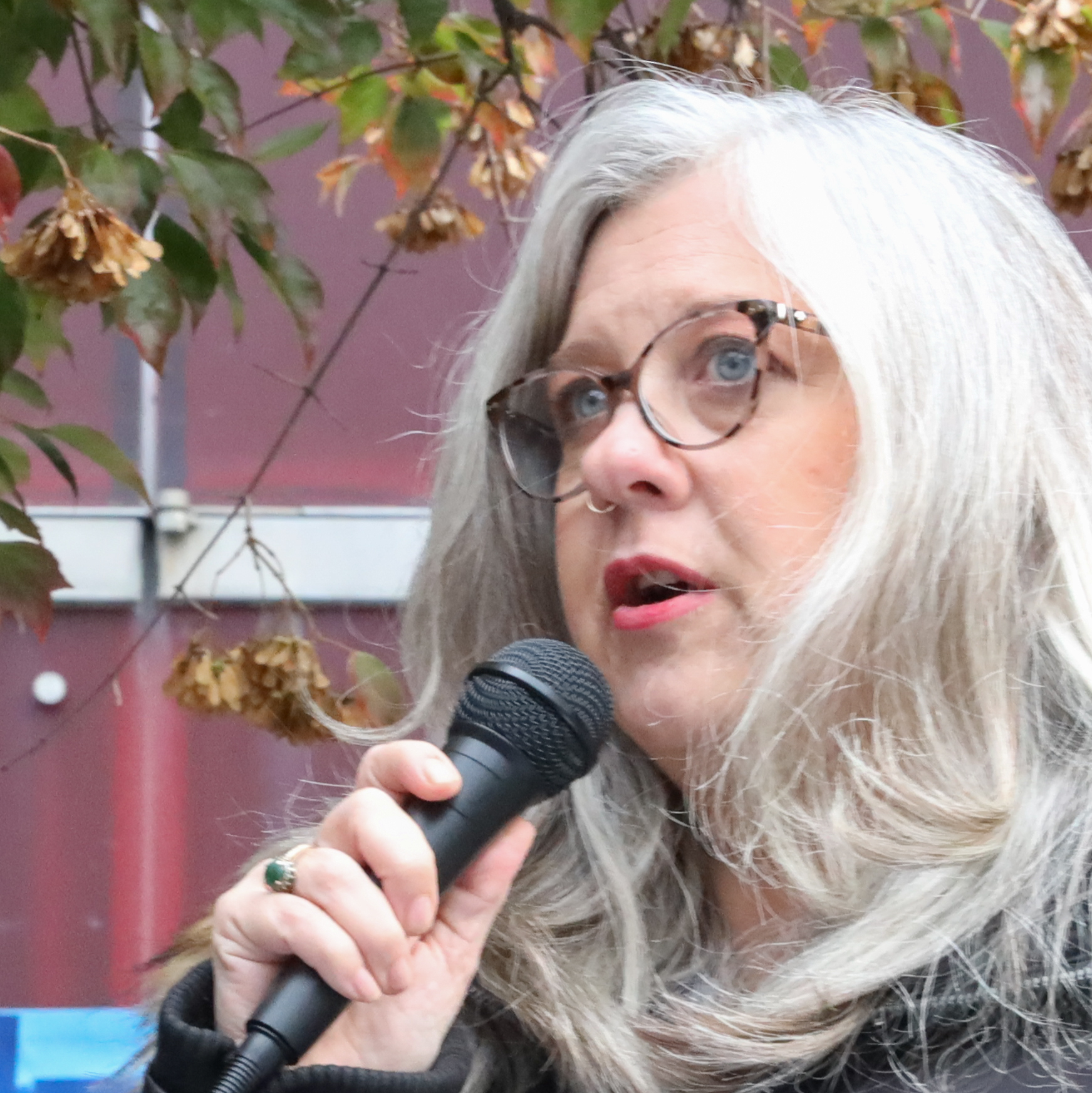
- Lisa Herbold in 2022

Member of the Seattle City Council from District 1
- In office January 4, 2016 – January 2, 2024
- Preceded by: Constituency established
- Succeeded by: Rob Saka

Personal details
- Born: June 14, 1967 (age 59)
- Party: Democratic
- Spouse: Robert Combs
- Children: 1
- Education: Syracuse University

Lisa Anne Herbold (born June 14, 1967) is an American politician. She served on the Seattle City Council representing the 1st District, which covers part of West Seattle, for two terms, from 2016 to 2023.

== Early life and education ==
Herbold was born and raised in New York State and studied political science and journalism at Syracuse University. While at Syracuse, she worked as a community organizer for Syracuse United Neighbors, ACORN, and the Tenants Union.

In 1997, Herbold helped coordinate Seattle City Councilmember Nick Licata, before joining his office as a legislative aide. She worked in Licata's office from 1998 to 2015, before running for city council.

== Seattle City Council ==
=== Elections ===
==== 2015 election ====
Herbold ran for the Seattle City Council in 2015 in the open District 1 seat and faced eight other challengers, including Shannon Braddock, an aide to King County Councilmember Joe McDermott, and Brianna Thomas, a non-profit organizer. In the August primary, Herbold came in first, with 30.15% of the vote, and advanced to the general election with Braddock, who earned 27.78%.

Herbold supported greater renters protection, rent control, and criticized Braddock's donations from landlords. Both candidates ran as progressives, but Herbold's opponents called her a political radical, while Braddock's opponents criticized her for being too close to business interests.

In the November general election, Herbold narrowly defeated Braddock, 49.57% to 49.59%, a margin of 39 votes. She was sworn into office on January 4, 2016.

==== 2019 election ====
Herbold ran for reelection in 2019 and faced two challengers in the primary election: defense attorney Phil Tavel and former Seattle police officer Brendan Kolding. In the August primary, Herbold came in first, with 50% of the vote, and advanced to the general election with Tavel, who earned 32%.

In the general election, Herbold and Tavel disagreed on the key issue of homelessness, with Herbold supporting increasing revenue for homelessness services, while Tavel focused on the effectiveness of the money spent. Herbold criticized Tavel for opening multiple businesses that were subsequently dissolved by the state, to which Tavel responded by saying the criticism was a "baseless attack."

Herbold, along with incumbent Kshama Sawant and District 2 challenger Tammy Morales, received national attention when Amazon donated $1.45 million to support opposing candidates via the Seattle Metropolitan Chamber of Commerce's political action committee, the Civic Alliance for a Sound Economy (CASE). She criticized CASE's support of Tavel, who received about $140,000 from the PAC.

In the November general election, Herbold defeated Tavel, with 55.71% of the vote to 43.90%.

=== Tenure ===
During her tenure, Herbold chaired the Civil Rights, Utilities, Economic Development, and Arts committee, as well as the Public Safety and Human Services committee.

In October 2019, Herbold contacted Seattle's chief of police to report what she thought was an RV stolen and parked in front of her home as a prank in West Seattle. The RV belonged to a homeless couple, who parked it near one of their mothers' home. Herbold was not seeking the removal of the RV, but to report it to the police chief. She subsequently acknowledged that she had violated the council's ethics code by contacting a department head directly and paid a $500 fine to the Seattle Ethics and Elections Commission.

Although she stated the Navigation Team had improved connecting homeless individuals to services in the 2019 election, she voted to eliminate the team in 2020. Herbold, and a majority of the council, would override Mayor Jenny Durkan's veto on the budget, which include the Navigation Team cut and divestiment from the police. By 2021, Herbold stated her position on large-scale reduction in the police force had evolved, saying, "I was not interested in pursuing a sworn officer reduction any greater than those 70 layoffs."

In 2023, Herbold pushed for an amendment to Seattle's Comprehensive Plan that would impose "impact fees" on new housing. Later that year, she sponsored and passed legislation to establish new building emissions standards, aiming to reduce greenhouse gas emissions.

In December 2022, Herbold announced she would not seek reelection. She cited a coalition of progressive activist targeting council seats as the reason behind her decision. Herbold stated, "I am reminded that we cannot repeat the 2021 race for the City Attorney when a very strong and proven progressive didn’t advance to the general, forcing a choice between a carceral system abolitionist and a Republican."

== Personal life ==
Herbold has a daughter, a granddaughter, a grandson, and two step-daughters.

== Electoral history ==
=== 2015 election ===
Seattle City Council District 1, Primary Election 2015
Party	Candidate	Votes	%
Nonpartisan	Lisa Herbold	5,234	30.15%
Nonpartisan	Shannon Braddock	4,824	27.78%
Nonpartisan	Phillip Tavel	3,156	18.18%
Nonpartisan	Brianna Thomas	1,765	10.17%
Nonpartisan	Chas Redmond	1,268	7.30%
Nonpartisan	Jody Rushmer	368	2.12%
Nonpartisan	Karl Wirsing	245	1.41%
Nonpartisan	Arturo Robles	240	1.38%
Nonpartisan	Pavel Goberman	204	1.17%
Nonpartisan	Write-in	58	0.33%
Turnout		17,728	29.32%
Registered electors		60,474	

Seattle City Council District 1, General Election 2015
Party	Candidate	Votes	%
Nonpartisan	Lisa Herbold	12,459	49.75%
Nonpartisan	Shannon Braddock	12,420	49.59%
Nonpartisan	Write-in	164	0.65%
Majority		39	0.16%
Turnout		27,757	45.51%
Registered electors		60,991	

=== 2019 election ===
Seattle City Council District 1, Primary Election 2019
Party	Candidate	Votes	%
Nonpartisan	Lisa Herbold	13,405	50.62%
Nonpartisan	Phil Tavel	8,558	32.32%
Nonpartisan	Brendan Kolding	4,435	16.75%
Nonpartisan	Write-in	85	0.32%
Turnout		27,528	40.42%
Registered electors		68,102	

Seattle City Council District 1, General Election 2019
Party	Candidate	Votes	%
Nonpartisan	Lisa Herbold	20,033	55.71%
Nonpartisan	Phil Tavel	15,787	43.90%
Nonpartisan	Write-in	139	0.39%
Turnout		37,401	54.51%
Registered electors		68,617	
