= Andrew J. Lewis (politician) =

American politician (born 1989)

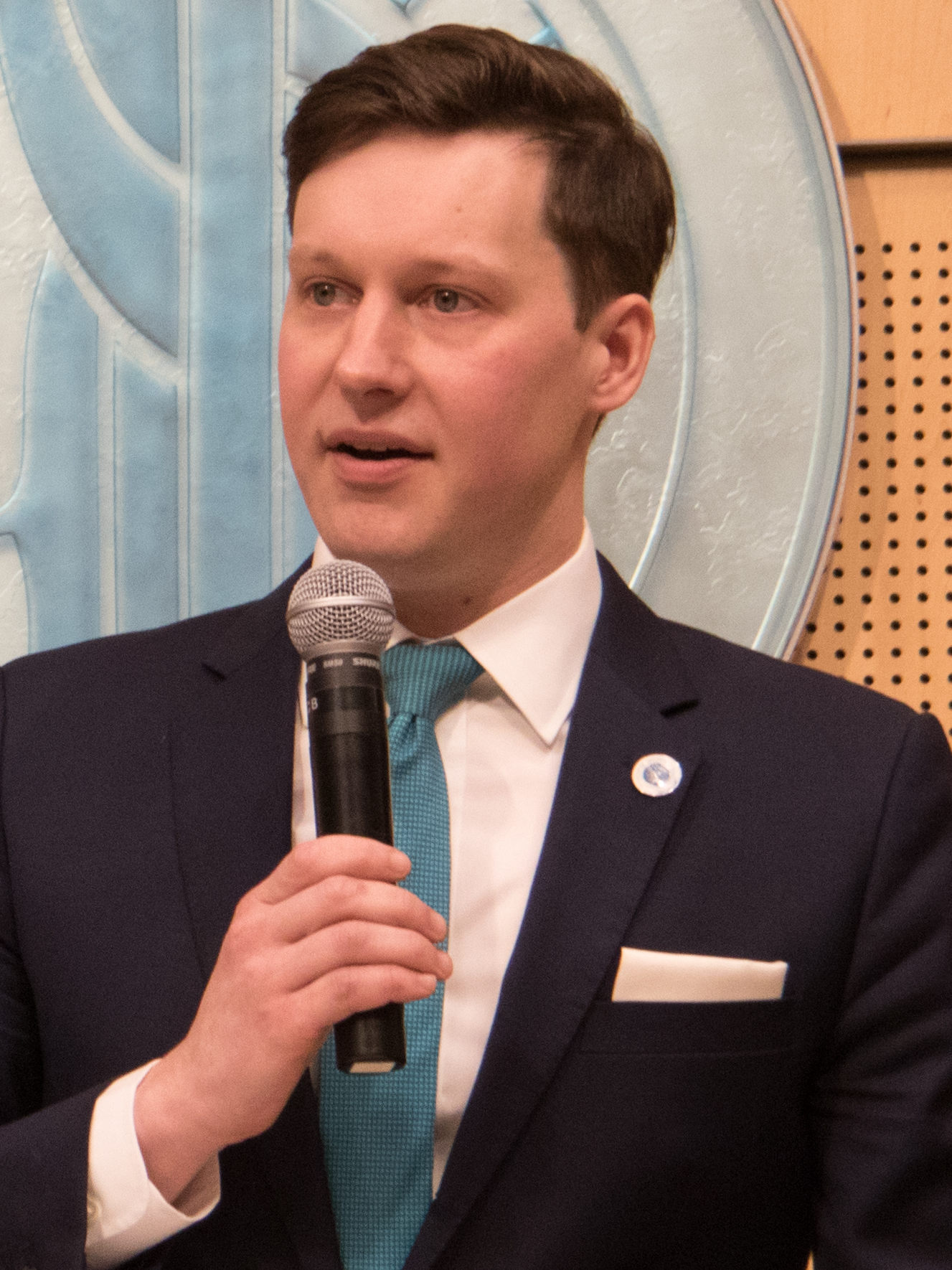

Member of the Seattle City Council from District 7
- In office January 6, 2020 – January 2, 2024
- Preceded by: Sally Bagshaw
- Succeeded by: Bob Kettle

Personal details
- Born: November 11, 1989 (age 35); Seattle, Washington, U.S.
- Political party: Democratic
- Education: University of Washington (BA); London School of Economics (MA); University of California, Berkeley (JD)
- Profession: Attorney

Andrew Joseph Lewis (born November 11, 1989) is an American politician and attorney who served as a member of the Seattle City Council from District 7. He was an assistant city attorney before his election to city council and worked on political campaigns.

== Early life and career ==
Lewis was raised in Seattle's Ballard neighborhood to a family of local political organizers; his father worked for Seattle City Light and his mother was a nurse at Harborview Medical Center. His activities in politics began in high school by attending marches and volunteering for political campaigns, including stints on the Seattle Youth Council and the board of the Young Democrats of Washington.

Lewis attended the University of Washington, where he earned a Bachelor of Arts in history and political science, was named a Harry S. Truman Scholar, and interned with the Seattle City Council. Lewis was the government relations director for the Associated Students of the University of Washington from 2011 to 2012. He was the campaign director for Nick Licata in his successful 2009 reelection campaign. Lewis earned a Master of Arts degree from the London School of Economics and Juris Doctor from the UC Berkeley School of Law. He also served as a teaching assistant for former Labor Secretary Robert Reich, who later endorsed him.

Upon his return to Seattle, Lewis was appointed to serve on the Seattle Human Rights Commission and the Rental Housing Inspection Stakeholder Committee. He also worked as a deputy prosecutor for the King County Juvenile Division until he left to work as an assistant city attorney for Seattle.

== Seattle City Council ==
=== 2019 election ===
Lewis announced his campaign for the District 7 council seat in November 2018, shortly after incumbent Sally Bagshaw announced she would not run.

He campaigned to expand housing affordability in the city and received support from progressive groups and local labor unions. On public safety, he proposed creating a drug court for the city of Seattle and a "high-frequency offender unit" in the City Attorney's office. Lewis wanted to get the Seattle Police Department out of its Consent decree, to implement long-term changes such as increasing staff.

Lewis finished first among the field in the primary election, with 32 percent of the vote, and advanced to the general election alongside former Seattle Police Department chief Jim Pugel. His campaign received financial support from a local hotel workers union's political action committee, while Pugel received support from Amazon and the Seattle Metropolitan Chamber of Commerce.

Lewis won in the general election with 53 percent of the vote after initial returns showed him narrowly trailing Pugel. He became the youngest city councilmember in Seattle history, entering office at the age of 29.

=== Tenure (2020–2024) ===
Lewis was sworn in on December 31, 2019, at the community P-Patch atop the Mercer Garage at the Seattle Center, which he announced would not close. He took office in January 2020 and was named to a regional homelessness governing board alongside at-large councilmember Lorena González.

Lewis did not support Seattle head tax ordinance. In July 2020, Lewis stated he was open to cuts to the Seattle Police Department budget, and by August, he voted to reduce funding to the Seattle Police Department by $3 million.

=== 2023 election ===
In January 2023, Lewis announced that he would seek reelection in the upcoming city council elections. He was one of only three councilmembers who chose to run for reelection. Lewis won the August primary election with 43 percent of the vote, leading a field with five challengers; former U.S. Navy officer Bob Kettle placed second with 32% of the vote and advanced to the general election alongside Lewis.

In the general election, Kettle stated that Lewis's support, and later votes, to defund SPD were wrong and "sapped the morale" of police officers. Lewis said those votes were a mistake, but still supported non-armed 911 response options. Lewis lost the general election to Kettle by a two-point margin. Lewis would be the only incumbent to lose reelection that year.

== Personal life ==
Lewis is a resident of the Lower Queen Anne neighborhood in Seattle. In an interview with The Seattle Times, he described himself as "not a socialist" and identified as a labor Democrat.

After losing reelection, Lewis would work for a private legal firm.

== Electoral history ==
Seattle City Council District 7, 2019 primary election
Party	Candidate	Votes	%
Nonpartisan	Andrew J. Lewis	8,409	31.71%
Nonpartisan	Jim Pugel	6,566	24.76%
Nonpartisan	Daniela Lipscomb-Eng	2,591	9.77%
Nonpartisan	Michael George	2,460	9.28%
Nonpartisan	Gene Burrus	1,501	5.66%
Nonpartisan	Jason Williams	1,347	5.08%
Nonpartisan	Don Harper	1,265	4.77%
Nonpartisan	James Donaldson	824	3.11%
Nonpartisan	Naveed Jamali	788	2.97%
Nonpartisan	Isabelle J. Kerner	691	2.61 %
Nonpartisan	Write-in	30	0.3%
Turnout		27,556	38.51%
Registered electors		71,550	

Seattle City Council District 7, 2019 general election
Party	Candidate	Votes	%
Nonpartisan	Andrew J. Lewis	18,336	52.98%
Nonpartisan	Jim Pugel	16,122	46.58%
Nonpartisan	Write-in	152	0.44%
Turnout		36,522	50.36%
Registered electors		72,517	

=== 2023 Elections ===
Seattle City Council District 7, 2023 primary election
Party	Candidate	Votes	%
Nonpartisan	Andrew J. Lewis	8,114	43.45%
Nonpartisan	Bob Kettle	5,888	31.53%
Nonpartisan	Olga Sagan	2,429	13.01%
Nonpartisan	Aaron Marshall	1,372	7.35%
Nonpartisan	Isabelle Kerner	502	2.69%
Nonpartisan	Wade Sowders	323	1.73%
Nonpartisan	Write-in	46	0.25%
Turnout		19,039	32.58%
Registered electors		58,437	

Seattle City Council District 7, 2023 general election
Party	Candidate	Votes	%
Nonpartisan	Bob Kettle	11,951	50.78%
Nonpartisan	Andrew J. Lewis	11,512	48.91%
Nonpartisan	Write-in	74	0.31%
Turnout		24,178	41.06%
Registered electors		58,884	
