= Sally Bagshaw =

American politician (born 1951)

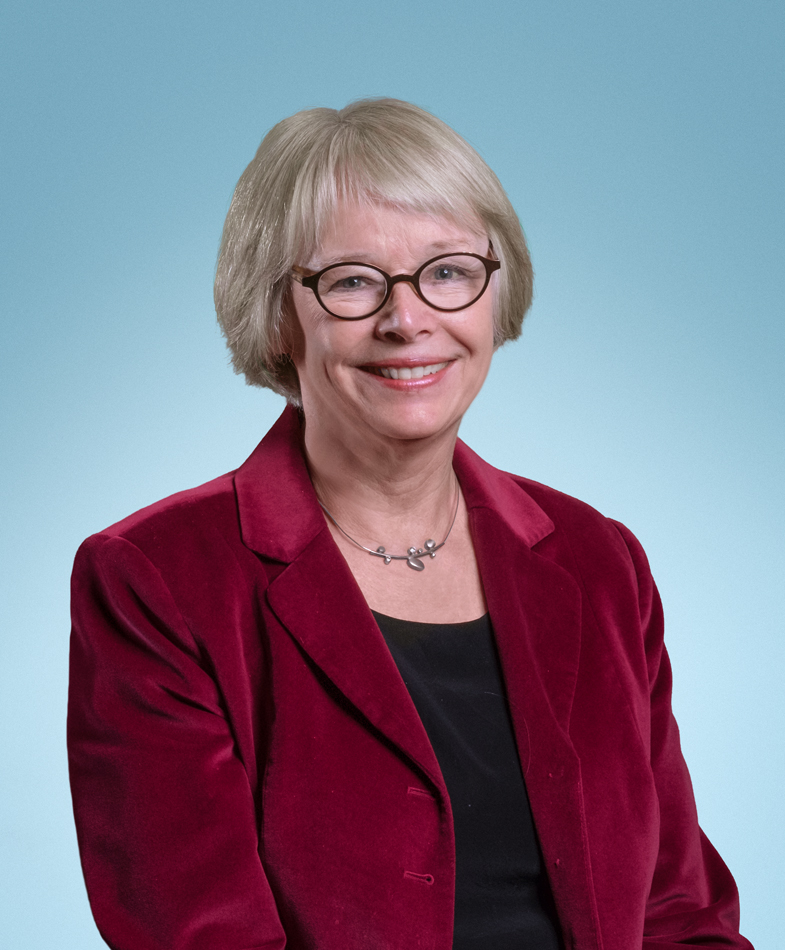
- Bagshaw in 2016

Member of the Seattle City Council from District 7
- In office January 1, 2016 – December 31, 2019
- Succeeded by: Andrew J. Lewis

Member of the Seattle City Council, Position 4
- In office January 1, 2010 – December 31, 2015
- Preceded by: Jan Drago
- Succeeded by: Redistricted

Personal details
- Born: February 15, 1951 (age 75) Portland, Oregon
- Party: Democratic
- Spouse: Brad Bagshaw
- Children: 2 sons
- Education: Stanford University (BA); University of Idaho (JD)
- Website: Council webpage

Sally G. Bagshaw (born 15 February 1951) is an American politician. She was a member of the Seattle City Council from 2016 to 2019. Before being elected to city council, she had been chief civil deputy prosecutor in the King County Prosecuting Attorney's Office for eight years under Norm Maleng.

== Legal career ==
Bagshaw attended Stanford University for her undergraduate degree, then University of Idaho earning a Juris Doctor degree. She began her legal career as an assistant attorney general at both the University of Washington and Washington State University. For thirteen years, we worked at the King County Prosecuting Attorney's Office, for eight of those years she was the chief civil deputy prosecutor. In 2004, Bagshaw earned the King County Bar Association's Pro Bono Lawyer of the Year award and the State Bar Association's annual award for lawyers in public service.

== Seattle City Council ==
=== 2009 election ===
On March 1, 2009, councilmember Jan Drago announced that she would not seek reelection, creating an open seat for Position 4. Drago urged Bagshaw to run for her seat because of her deep knowledge and unique skills. Bagshaw ran on replacing the Alaskan Way Viaduct with a tunnel, changing zoning laws to increase low-income housing and allowing for Assessor Dwelling Units in single-family zones, and bringing light rail to West Seattle.

Bagshaw would have to walk back a statement at a primary debate in which she raised a "No" card when candidates were asked if they had contributed to a Republican campaign. Bagshaw donated $150 to Republican Attorney General Rob Mckenna, and her husband donated $900 to King County Prosecutor Dan Satterberg She would later correct herself, and in an interview state, "...I worked hard to get Obama elected—but I supported a couple of Republicans over the years and I'm being shunned... I could reach across the aisle."

In the primary election, Bagshaw won a majority of votes, 51%, with her nearest challenger, David Bloom, only garnering 18% of the vote. In the November General election, Bagshaw won in a landslide with 69% of the vote compared to Bloom's 30%.

=== 2013 election ===
Bagshaw ran for reelection in 2013 with only one challenger, Sam Bellomio, who was known for speaking at council public comments calling the council "terrorists" and saying their meetings were "worse than Nazi Germany."

Bagshaw won in a landslide in the November General Election against Bellomio, 84% to 15%.

=== 2015 election ===
In 2015, all nine city council seats would be up for election, with seven seats turning from city-wide to district seats. Bagshaw was initially open to running in District 4, but ultimately decided to run in District 7 which covers Downtown, South Lake Union, Queen Anne, and Magnolia. There would be two other challengers for the district 4 seat.

In the August Primary election, Bagshaw would get first place in a landslide, with 76% of the vote, with her nearest competitor, Deborah Zech-Artis, only receiving 13%. In the general election, Bagshaw won in another landslide, with 81% of the vote compared to Zech-Artis' 18%.

=== Tenure ===
During her tenure as chair of the Human Services Committee, Bagshaw oversaw the council's response to the East Duwamish Greenbelt homeless encampment, also known as The Jungle. Councilmembers, included Bagshaw, wanted to slow down Mayor Ed Murray's plan to clear the encampment until permanent housing was offered to all people in the encampment. Bagshaw would receive backlash from community members over a slow response from the council and defended herself and the council by saying, "Nobody stopped or slowed down the work under the Duwamish Greenbelt."

On a 6–3 vote, the council, including Bagshaw, voted to sweep the Jungle. Later, Bagshaw floated the idea of reopening the Jungle, stating "I'm not saying it's the best place. I'm saying it may be better than letting them run around in neighborhoods where they're camping and causing problems."

Bagshaw worked closely on the demolition of the Alaskan Way Viaduct and later the creation of the State Route 99 tunnel.

After Ed Murray's resignation, the council had to vote on an interim mayor as his replacement. Bagshaw would nominate council member Tim Burgess (politician) and not fellow councilmember Lorena González. Her reasoning was "he’s the right guy" and when asked to elaborate, Bagshaw said "Well, Lorena’s getting married at the end of November. She’s also a candidate. Those two are very good reasons." Gonzalez responded by saying, "Let's stick to merit. #feminism," with Bagshaw apologizing to the full council. Burgess would be voted by the full council to replace Murray.

While in office, Bagshaw would pay a $150 fine to the Seattle Ethics and Elections Commission over her involvement in a campaign for a parks district.

In November 2018, Bagshaw announced that she would not seek reelection.

== Personal life ==
Bagshaw is married to her husband, Brad, and has two sons. At 47, Bagshaw earned her pilots license and sails internationally on her sailboat. In 2020, Bagshaw joined Harvard's Advanced Leadership Initiative as a fellow.

== Electoral history ==
=== 2009 election ===
Seattle City Council Position 4, Primary Election 2009
Party	Candidate	Votes	%
Nonpartisan	Sally Bagshaw	63,348	51.01%
Nonpartisan	David Bloom	22,690	18.27%
Nonpartisan	Dorsol Plants	17,822	14.35%
Nonpartisan	Thomas Tobin	10,274	8.27%
Nonpartisan	Brian Carver	9,581	7.72%
Nonpartisan	Write-in	467	0.38%
Turnout		146,568	38.60%
Registered electors		379,721	

Seattle City Council Position 4, General Election 2009
Party	Candidate	Votes	%
Nonpartisan	Sally Bagshaw	123,316	69.25%
Nonpartisan	David Bloom	54,210	30.44%
Nonpartisan	Write-in	556	0.31%
Majority		69,106	38.81%
Turnout		216,573	57.73%
Registered electors		375,164	

=== 2013 election ===
Seattle City Council Position 4, General Election 2013
Party	Candidate	Votes	%
Nonpartisan	Sally Bagshaw	146,908	84.14%
Nonpartisan	Sam Bellomio	26,582	15.22%
Nonpartisan	Write-in	1,109	0.64%
Majority		120,326	68.92%
Turnout		215,550	52.50%
Registered electors		410,572	

=== 2015 election ===
Seattle City Council District 7, Primary Election 2015
Party	Candidate	Votes	%
Nonpartisan	Sally Bagshaw	12,292	76.63%
Nonpartisan	Deborah Zech-Artis	2,144	13.37%
Nonpartisan	Gus Hartmann	1,487	9.27%
Nonpartisan	Write-in	117	0.73%
Turnout		16,532	26.73%
Registered electors		61,837	

Seattle City Council District 7, General Election 2015
Party	Candidate	Votes	%
Nonpartisan	Sally Bagshaw	18,576	80.90%
Nonpartisan	Deborah Zech-Artis	4,213	18.35%
Nonpartisan	Write-in	172	0.75%
Majority		14,363	62.55%
Turnout		26,207	41.88%
Registered electors		62,583	
