= Mercedes-Benz Fashion Week Tbilisi =

Georgian fashion industry event

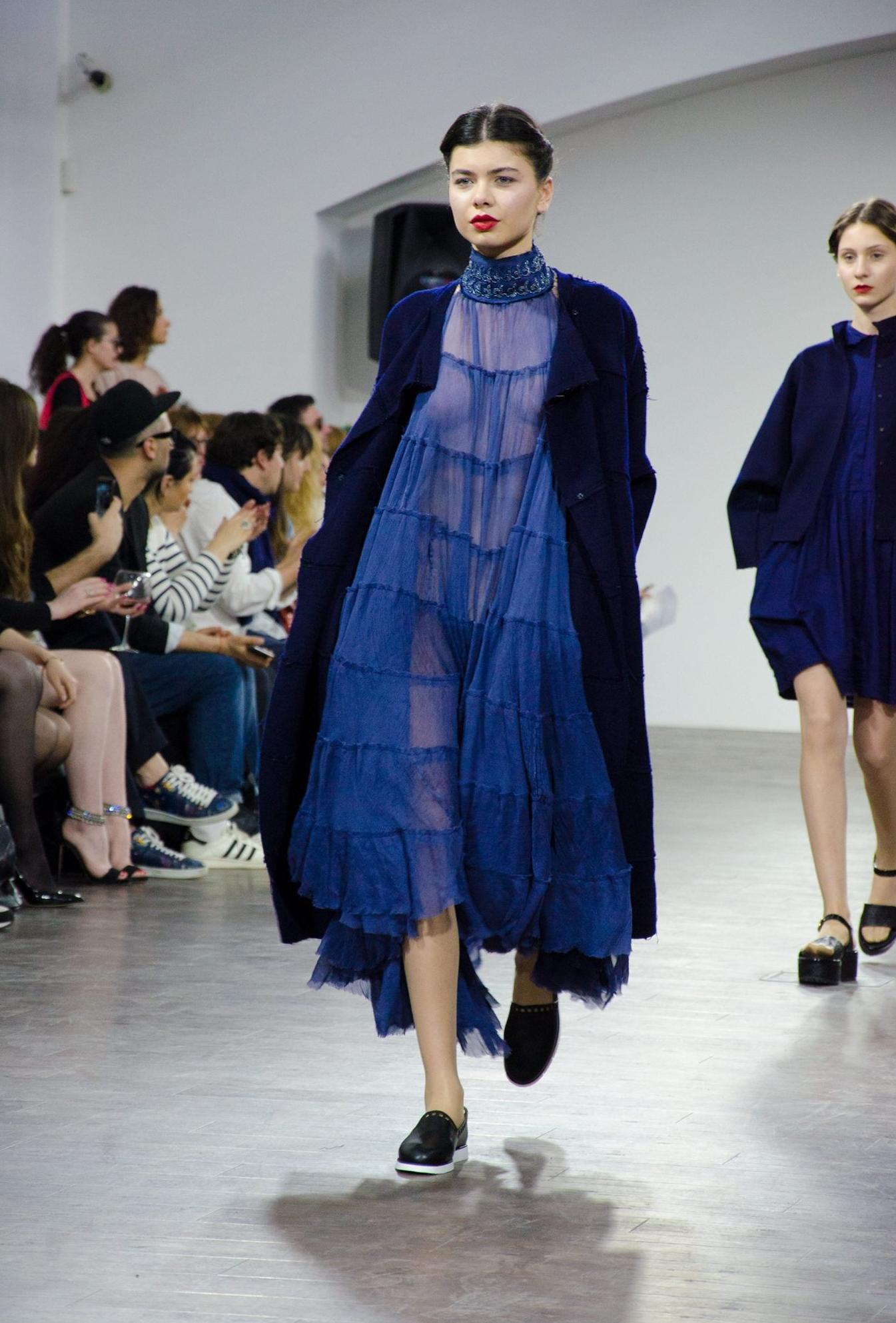
- MBFWT
- Genre: clothing and fashion exhibitions
- Frequency: semi-annually
- Location: Tbilisi
- Inaugurated: 2015
- Founder: Sofia Chkonia
- Website: mbfashionweektbilisi.com

Mercedes-Benz Fashion Week Tbilisi (MBFWT) (Georgian: მერსედეს-ბენცის თბილისის მოდის კვირეული) is a Mercedes-Benz-sponsored Georgian fashion week in its capital city of Tbilisi. MBFWT was established in 2015. During the fashion week ARTGeorgia art exhibition and BENEXT international fashion design contest is also held.

== Designers ==
Mercedes-Benz Fashion Week Tbilisi featured fashion designers such as Anouki, Avtandil, Lako Bukia, Tako Mekvabidze, among others.
