= Cathy Moore =

American politician

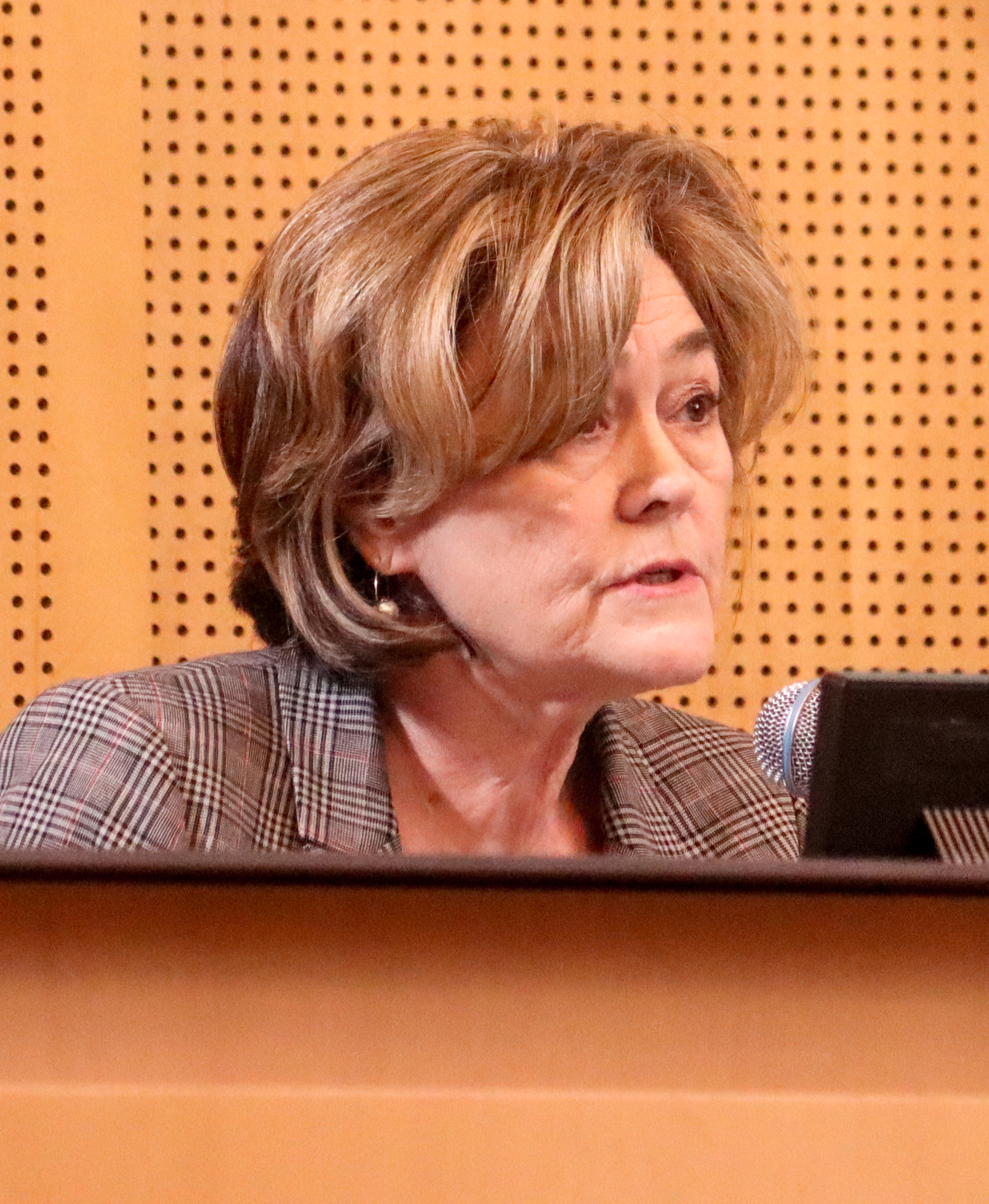
- Moore in 2024

Member of the Seattle City Council from District 5
- In office January 1, 2024 – July 7, 2025
- Preceded by: Debora Juarez
- Succeeded by: Debora Juarez

Judge of the King County Superior Court
- In office January 2017 – February 25, 2022
- Preceded by: Ronald Kessler
- Succeeded by: Jason Holloway

Personal details
- Born: Seattle, WA
- Party: Democratic
- Spouse: David Baxter
- Children: 3 sons
- Education: Binghamton University (BA); Albany Law School (JD)

Cathy Moore is an American lawyer and politician elected to represent District 5 of the Seattle City Council. She was a King County Superior Court judge from 2017 to 2022. During her time on the Seattle City Council, she opposed various efforts to increase housing supply and development in the city.

== Legal career ==
After graduating from Binghamton University and Albany Law School, Moore worked in Brooklyn as a public defender and continued to do so after she moved back to Seattle. She left her job as a public defender to serve various Seattle city jobs on an interim bases, including city clerk and legislative aide to councilmember Richard Conlin. Before her election to judge on the King County Superior Court, Moore was a judge pro tem and commissioner pro tem in King County Superior Court, as well as a tribal drug court judge and a state administrative law judge. She also served as the chair of the Seattle Human Rights Commission.

=== King County Superior Court ===
Moore ran for King County Superior Court in 2016 after Judge Ronald Kessler chose not to run for reelection. In the August primary, Moore finished first with 55% of the vote, with Air Force veteran and lawyer Eric Newman coming in second with 36%.

In the general election, the King County Bar Associated openly faulted Moore for a name tag at an event describing her as a judge and "elected official", at the time she was not, and misleading campaign materials. Moore said the campaign material was "...not misleading" and that she covered the "elected official" portion of the name tag. In the November election, Moore defeated Newman 55% to 44%.

Moore faced no challengers for reelection and retired in February 2022.

== Seattle City Council ==
=== 2023 election ===
Moore ran for city council in District 5 against nine other challengers after council president Debora Juarez announced she would not seek reelection. She focused her campaign on public safety, increasing the police force and increasing violence intervention prevention, as well as affordable housing and small business support. She was accused of flip-flopping on the criminalizing public drug use, at first opposing criminalization but then confirming support through the Downtown Seattle Association and The Seattle Times questionnaires. The Moore campaign did not respond to questions on changing her position during the primary, saying they did not have the time to, stating "We're focused on winning the election, and are prioritizing our limited time." In the August primary election, Moore came in first with 31% of the vote and ChrisTiana ObeySumner, a social equity consultant, with 24%.

ObeySumner focused her campaign on progressive issues, such as reducing the police budget, increasing alternatives to policing, stopping homeless sweeps, and not criminalizing public drug use. Moore continued to support Mayor Bruce Harrell plan to hire an additional 300 to 400 officers, and that the police budget was about right. Moore confirmed her support for the city ordinance that makes drug use and possession prosecutable, even though it allocated no additional funding for treatment. Moore received backing from business and real estate independent expenditure committees, which gave nearly $1.1 million in total to more "conservative" city council candidates.

In the November general election, Moore won in a landslide with 64% of the vote to ObeySumner's 36%. Moore was elected with a slate of other candidates that were considered "moderates" and generally support Mayor Harrell's agenda.

=== Tenure ===
Moore served as the chair of the Housing and Human Services Committee and has worked to make changes to the Seattle Housing levy passed in 2023. The committee would vote against the legislation, brought up by councilmember Tammy Morales, that would reduce red tape for affordable housing developers. After the vote, Morales said "Despite the fact that everybody’s talking about the need for more affordable housing, when it comes down to it, there’s either no understanding of how we actually get there, or no willingness to really take action." At the next full council meeting, Moore accused Morales of calling other councilmembers "evil, corporate shills" and of "The vilification of your fellow council members in the media—it is uncalled for, it is unprofessional." There is no record of Morales calling other councilmembers "evil, corporate shills."

In a February 2024 council meeting, protestors and asylum seekers disrupted the meeting by banging windows and demonstrating in the chambers. Protestors were arrested and the council chambers were cleared, with Moore stating she felt "physically threatened" and that "We need to make sure that this does not happen going forward." The protestors were charged with first-degree criminal trespassing, one was charged with obstruction as well.

At a press conference on Aurora Ave with city attorney Ann Davison, Moore announced that she would introduce legislation to create "Stay Out of Areas of Prostitution" (SOAP) zones on Aurora Ave in conjunction with councilmember Robert Kettle's "Stay Out of Drugs Areas" (SODA) zone legislation. Moore and Davison introduced the legislation in response to high crime on Aurora associated with prostitutions. City council Central Staff updated a memo in regards to comments by Moore, which removed sections that raised concerns about the legislation's impact and lack of additional funding for diversion and emergency services.

In 2024, Moore voted no on a bill that would have reduced some zoning restrictions for affordable housing projects. That same year, she was the lone vote to opposed a 182-unit residential building in Belltown. That same year, she was also the lone vote to oppose a bill to exempt new housing, hotel, and research science developments in Seattle’s downtown core from the city's onerous design review process.

In 2025, Moore opposed modest zoning reforms that would allow low-rise apartment buildings near the centers in some Seattle neighborhoods as part of a larger reform to alleviate the housing shortage in Seattle. She specifically mentioned that she did not want increased density in her own neighborhood, Maple Leaf. She has said that she does not believe increases in housing supply will lead to more affordable housing. She has also said, "I’d never really thought about land use or housing."

On June 2, 2025, Moore announced that she would resign from the city council citing health and personal reasons for the resignation. Her final day on the council was July 7.

== Personal life ==
Moore resides in Seattle with her husband and three children. She is the legal counsel for her family's landscaping business.
