= Rosie Hidalgo =

American attorney & political advisor (born 1965)

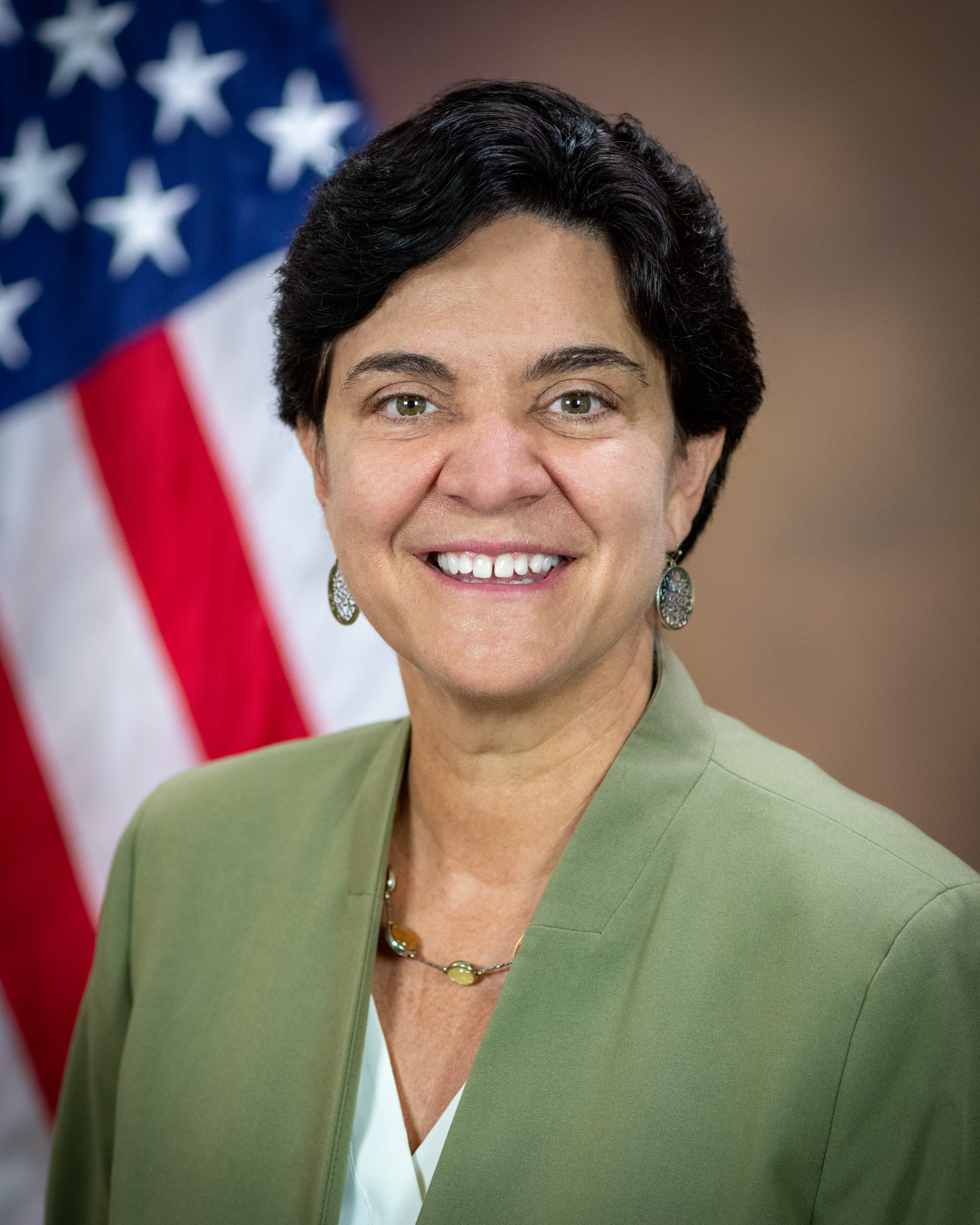
- Hidalgo in 2023

Director of the Office on Violence Against Women
- In office July 18, 2023 – January 20, 2025
- President: Joe Biden
- Preceded by: Susan B. Carbon
- Succeeded by: TBD

Personal details
- Born: November 3, 1965 (age 59); Washington, D.C., U.S.
- Education: Georgetown University (BA); New York University (JD)

Rosemarie Hidalgo (born November 3, 1965) is an American attorney and political advisor who served as the director of the Office on Violence Against Women from 2023 to 2025. Hidalgo had formerly served as deputy director in the office from 2014 to 2017. Prior to taking the position, Hidalgo served as a special assistant to President Joe Biden and senior advisor for the White House Gender Policy Council since January 2021.

== Early life and education ==
Hidalgo was born on November 3, 1965 in Washington, D.C. She is the daughter of immigrants from Cuba. She earned a Bachelor of Arts degree in political science and government from Georgetown University and a Juris Doctor from the New York University School of Law.

== Career ==
After graduating from law school, Hidalgo worked as a staff attorney for the Door – A Center of Alternatives and Legal Services of Northern Virginia. From 2004 to 2006, she was a social protection consultant at the World Bank Group. From 2006 to 2009, she was the director of policy for Alianza, a non-profit organization. From 2014 to 2017, she served as deputy director of the Office on Violence Against Women for policy.

From 2017 to 2021, she was the senior director of policy for Casa de Esperanza. She became an advisor on gender-based violence for the White House Gender Policy Council and special assistant to President Joe Biden in March 2021.

In 2023, she was chosen by President Biden to serve as director of the Office on Violence Against Women. In this capacity, she was responsible for overseeing the office's $700 million budget, which is allocated for gender violence prevention and survivor support services.

Hidalgo's tenure as Director ended with the inauguration of Donald Trump on January 20th, 2025.
