= Office on Violence Against Women =

US government agency

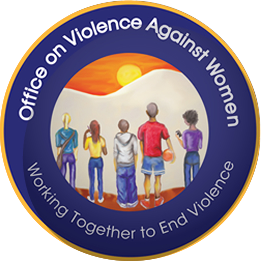

Agency overview
- Formed: 1995; 31 years ago
- Headquarters: 145 N Street NE, Washington, D.C.; 38.906827°N 77.004645°W
- Annual budget: $413 million (2013)
- Agency executive: Vacant, Director
- Parent agency: United States Department of Justice
- Website: www.justice.gov/ovw

The United States Office on Violence Against Women (OVW) was created following the Violence Against Women Act (VAWA) of 1994. The Act was renewed in 2005, 2013 and again in 2022. The Violence Against Women Act legislation requires the Office on Violence Against Women to work to respond to and reduce violence against women in many different areas, including on college campuses and in people's homes. VAWA requires Office on Violence Against Women to administer justice and strengthen services for victims of domestic violence, dating violence, sexual assault, and stalking.

The Office on Violence Against Women is headed by a director, who is appointed by the President and confirmed by the Senate. The principal deputy director serves directly under the director, as do the deputy directors. Until January 2017, Bea Hanson, Ph.D., was the acting director and principal deputy director. When Hanson resigned in January 2017, Deputy Director Nadine M. Neufville became acting director.

As an office in the United States Department of Justice, the Office on Violence Against Women receives federal funding for federal grants that are awarded to communities across America. These grants are used to create successful partnerships between federal, state, tribal, and local authorities as well as provide helpful services to victims of domestic violence, dating violence, sexual assault, and stalking. During fiscal year 2017, Office on Violence Against Women awarded $450,000,000 of grants. For example, Sexual Assault Services Program assists victims of sexual assault and family members affected by it. Since its inception, Office on Violence Against Women has awarded over $6 billion in grants directed towards such projects.

== Organization ==
The Office on Violence Against Women is headed by a director. The principal deputy director serves under the director, and the deputy director for tribal affairs under the principal deputy director. On the third and lowest tier of the office rests Training and Technical Assistance, Program Development and Evaluation and Demonstration/Special Projects.

=== Director ===
Former Iowa Attorney General Bonnie Campbell was appointed the first director of the Office on Violence Against Women in March 1995.

Diane Stuart became director of the Office on Violence Against Women in October 2001. Stuart had been helping victims of domestic violence since 1989, and she worked as Utah Governor Mike Leavitt's Coordinator for Domestic Violence since 1996. Stuart created Utah's first mobile crisis team; trained police officers would arrive at crime scenes to counsel victims and offer resources.

The 2002 authorization bill for the United States Department of Justice elevated the position to a presidential appointment requiring confirmation by the Senate. The Director serves as the liaison between the Federal, state, tribal, and international governments in regards to matters concerning Violence Against Women (i.e., crimes of domestic violence, sexual assault, dating violence, and stalking). The Director also serves in that role internationally, with Native American tribes in the country, and within other offices of the United States Federal Government. The Director reports to the Attorney General and is responsible for the legal and policy provisions that are implemented under the Violence Against Women Act. The Director of the Office on Violence Against Women also has ultimate control over all grants, cooperative agreements and contracts that the Office on Violence Against Women issues, and oversees a budget of almost $400 million.

==== List of directors ====
#	Name	Years served	Notes	
1	Bonnie Campbell	1995–2001	Campbell was appointed the first director of the Office on Violence Against Women in March 1995.	
2	Diane Stuart	2001–2006	Stuart was appointed by President George W. Bush in 2001, and then officially nominated by President Bush and confirmed by the Senate in 2003 (under the new provisions of the Office that mandate a formal nomination). As Director, Stuart increased grant and cooperative agreement awards by fifty percent, implemented the President's Family Justice Center Initiative, and developed the Safety for Indian Women Initiative. Under her supervision, the Office on Violence Against Women also developed and implemented the Judicial Demonstration Oversight Initiative, the "Greenbook" Initiative, and the Supervised Visitation Demonstration Program.	
3	Mary Beth Buchanan	2006–2007	Buchanan (acting director) is a graduate of California University of Pennsylvania (1984) and of the University of Pittsburgh School of Law (1987). With her guidance as Director, the Office on Violence Against Women opened the New Orleans Family Justice Center as part of the Family Justice Center concept, launched the National Teen Dating Abuse Hotline and released PSAs to increase education about domestic abuse.	
4	Cindy Dyer	2007–2009	Dyer was nominated by President George W. Bush in August 2007 and confirmed by the Senate in December 2007. She is a graduate of Texas A&M University, B.A. and Baylor Law School, J.D. Under her direction, the OVW awarded money to Tribal Governments for the first time under the Grants to Indian Tribal Governments Program. The National Domestic Violence Hotline also received its two-millionth call while Dyer was Director of the Office on Violence Against Women.	
5	Catherine Pierce	2009–2010	Pierce was designated acting director by President Barack Obama in January 2009. She had also previously served in that role from January to October 2001. She joined the OVW in 1995 as one of original staff members, and started working as the deputy director of the office in 1997. In that capacity, she was responsible for public outreach and communications; helped launch OVW's Sexual Assault Services Program and the Culturally and Linguistically Specific Services Program; developed new grant programs created by the Violence Against Women Act; created the Office on Violence Against Women's technical assistance program; oversaw numerous demonstration initiatives; and implemented a comprehensive effort to measure the effectiveness of the Office on Violence Against Women's grant programs.	
6	Susan B. Carbon	2010–2012	Judge Carbon was appointed by President Barack Obama in 2009 and confirmed by the Senate in early 2010. During her tenure as Director, the Office on Violence Against Women continued to press for the reauthorization of the Violence Against Women Act. While she was in Office, the Office on Violence Against Women also worked on the Domestic Violence Homicide Prevention Demonstration Initiative and helped to elevate the discussion of sexual violence, including the redefining of rape in the Universal Crime Reporting Summer Reporting System. With her guidance, the Office on Violence Against Women also launched the Sexual Assault Demonstration Initiative, wrestled with reform for family courts regarding domestic violence, and expanded the Office on Violence Against Women's sphere internationally	
7	Bea Hanson	2012–2017	Hanson served as the Acting Director of the Office on Violence Against Women until January 2017. Previously, she worked as the Principal Deputy Director of the Office on Violence Against Women (2011–2012). Her goals for her tenure as Acting Director were to maintain the financial commitments the Office had made to prevent and respond to domestic violence, sexual assault, dating violence, and stalking; to increase support for victims of sexual assault via expanding support services and improving the criminal justice system's response to sexual assault; to expand education about rape and its impact; to continue with the Office on Violence Against Women's initiative to reduce the rate of domestic violence homicide; and to provide appropriate services for low-income communities. She succeeded in what was her final goal: to encourage Congress to reauthorize the Violence Against Women Act, as President Obama reauthorized the Violence Against Women Act in March 2013.	Headshot of Bea Hanson, former Acting Director and Principal Deputy Director of the OVW, 2011–2017.
–	Nadine M. Neufville (acting)	2017–2019	Neufville has served as the Acting Director and deputy director of the Office on Violence Against Women since Hanson's resignation in January 2017	
–	Laura L. Rogers (acting)	2019–2021		
–	Allison Randall (acting)	2021–2023		
8	Rosie Hidalgo	2023–2025		

== Grant programs ==
The Office on Violence Against Women administers approximately 24 grant programs. Twenty programs use discretionary grant funds and four use formula grant funds. The Office can determine both how discretionary funds will be used and in what context. formula grants are must be distributed according to how the legislation describes. In order to receive funding under the formula grant program, the grant applicant must meet certain standards and qualifications.

=== Current formula grant programs ===
Name	Description
STOP (Services, Training, Officers, and Prosecutors) Violence Against Women Formula Grants to States	According to the Department of Justice, this program encourages law enforcement and criminal justice systems to improve their strategies and advocacy in response to violent crimes against women. This grant requires that state governments, organizations, and tribes "allocate 25 percent of the grant funds to law enforcement, 25 percent to prosecution, 5 percent to courts, and 30 percent to victim services. The remaining 15 percent is discretionary within the parameters of the Violence Against Women Act (VAWA)." According to Robert D. Evans representing the American Bar Association in congressional testimony for the VAWA of 2005, "VAWA-funded programs, including the Civil Legal Assistance and STOP Grants programs, have improved and aided in the prosecution of domestic violence, sexual assault, and child abuse cases; provided necessary training and support for law enforcement personnel; and increased civil legal services for victims of domestic violence, especially in the areas of civil protection orders and family law matters." STOP grants (Services, Training, Officers, Prosecutors) were appropriated $175 million, and an additional $50 million went to Transitional Housing Assistance Grants. A Criminal Justice Policy Review on this program and its effectiveness revealed that an increase of involvement of agencies with the community leads to a greater likelihood of programs experiencing success.
Sexual Assault Services Program	The Sexual Assault Services Program's mission is "to provide intervention, advocacy, accompaniment, support services, and related assistance" for all who are adversely affected by sexual assault. The utilities include a 24-hour sexual assault hotline and the maintenance/expansion of rape crisis centers. More specifically, the grants for the Sexual Assault Services Program help rape prevention clinics to provide up-to-date technology and methods of communication between young victims of sexual assault and caregivers. These public awareness campaigns play a critical role in informing teenagers of their rights and responsibilities with respect to sexual abuse. A fraction of the Sexual Assault Services Program's funds support the National Sexual Violence Resource Center, which contains resources related to sexual violence."VAWA 2005 authorized the appropriation of $50 million for each of Fiscal Years 2007 through 2011 for the Sexual Assault Services Program.
State and Territorial Sexual Assault and Domestic Violence Coalitions Program	This program creates statewide sexual assault coalitions that work with federal and local entities to support victims through advocacy, education, training and other services. According to the VAWA Measuring Effectiveness Initiative of the Muskie School of Public Service at the University of Southern Maine, the Violence Against Women Act of 2000 required the grant recipients and Attorney General to collect data that measures the effectiveness of each grant in the community where the money was donated in a semi-annual progress report.
Grants to Tribal Domestic Violence and Sexual Assault Coalitions	The Tribal Domestic Violence and Sexual Assault Coalitions Program (Tribal Coalitions Program) targets non-profit organizations, groups and individuals to improve systems of advocacy in Indian Tribes in order to help the women living there. The Tribal Coalitions Program primarily pursues and works with judicial agencies and police to organize well-coordinated responses to sexual assault within the state, tribe or territory.

=== Current discretionary grant programs ===
Name	Description
Campus Grant Program	The "Grants to Reduce Domestic Violence, Dating Violence, Sexual Assault, and Stalking on Campus Program" give money to institutions of higher education to help them improve their services, policies and protocols regarding domestic violence, dating violence, sexual assault, and stalking. With this grant, institutions are required to "create a coordinated community response to violence against women on campus", including forging external partnerships with law enforcement, non-profit organizations and the courts, as well as internal relationships with on-campus offices and organizations. Additionally, the institutions must create a mandatory prevention and education program, a judicial or disciplinary board and provide for law enforcement training "to effectively respond in sexual assault, domestic violence, dating violence, and stalking cases on campus".
Culturally and Linguistically Specific Services for Victims Program	This grant aims to fund successful existing programs that serve specific groups of victims. In addition, the grant is designed to enhance the access that victims, children and families have to local services and resources. The focus of the grant is on community-based programs that provide culturally and linguistically specific services to victims of domestic violence, dating violence, sexual assault, and stalking.
Education, Training and Enhanced Services to End Violence Against and Abuse of Women with Disabilities	This program's mission is to promote organizations that provide services for women with disabilities. The grant targets individuals with disabilities and funds programs that supply education, advocacy, and outreach for them. The grant also provides for cross-training with participating organizations, technical assistance to modify policies and protocols and funding to improve existing facilities to better serve deaf individuals or those with other disabilities.
Tribal Sexual Assault Services Program and Sexual Assault Services Program-Cultural	The Sexual Assault Services Program, has a separate grant designated for Native American Tribes as well as another separate grant for nonprofits that support culturally specific communities. The goals of both of these grants are to "[t]o provide direct intervention services and related assistance to victims of sexual violence and others collaterally affected " These services include advocacy, support groups, hotlines, crisis intervention, and training of agency members and outreach by agency members to make communities aware of the services that are available to them. Both grants provide for prevention efforts, research projects, criminal justice related projects, forensic medical examiner projects and training of other organizations or professionals.
Enhanced Training and Services to End Violence and Abuse of Women Later in Life Program	The objective of this grant is to address the needs of women 50 years and older by providing for training and other services that meet their specific needs." States, units of local government, Indian Tribal governments or Tribal organizations, nonprofit and nongovernmental victim services organizations with demonstrated experience in assisting elderly women or demonstrated experience in addressing sexual assault, domestic violence, dating violence, and stalking are eligible for this grant. Specific programs and areas of interest for this grant are focused on improving law enforcement, courts, government and community responses to sexual assault against victims over the age of 50 as well as providing for cross-training and enhancing services for victims.
Grants to Encourage Arrest Policies and Enforcement of Protection Orders	The aim of this program is to promote "the Department of Justice's mission by encouraging State, local, and Tribal governments and State, local, and Tribal courts to treat sexual assault, domestic violence, dating violence, and stalking as serious violations of criminal law requiring the coordinated involvement of the entire criminal justice system." Additionally, "[t]he Arrest Program challenges the community to listen, communicate, identify problems, and share ideas that will result in new responses to ensure victim safety and offender accountability". Purpose areas of the grant include pro-arrest programs in police departments, new policies and educational programs for judges and police, as well as coordinated computer tracking systems and centralized police enforcement of policies. E. Assata Wright for On The Issues notes that the mandatory arrest policy can be problematic with dual arresting because if a woman hits her abuser, she may be arrested in addition to the attacker, which discourages women from defending themselves and/or calling the police.
Grants to Tribal Domestic Violence and Sexual Assault Coalitions	The Tribal Domestic Violence and Sexual Assault Coalitions Program (Tribal Coalitions Program) targets non-profit organizations, groups and individuals to improve systems of advocacy in Indian Tribes in order to help the women living there. The Tribal Coalitions Program primarily pursues and works with judicial agencies and police to organize well-coordinated responses to sexual assault within the state, tribe or territory.
Legal Assistance for Victims Grant Program	This program is designed to make it easier for victims of abuse or violence to get access to "civil and criminal legal assistance".". The main goal of the Legal Assistance Program is to provide representation for victims of violent crime through innovative, collaborative programs. Camille Carey in the Columbia Journal of Gender and the Law noted that these grants generally go towards representation in family law cases and this can leave victims of domestic violence outside family court jurisdiction with their needs unmet.
Rural Grant Program	The Rural Grant Program works to lessen the frequency and effect of sexual crimes occurring in rural areas. It utilizes a collaborative approaches among the community, including those members of the legal system, to offer victims as much support as possible. A study by Mitchell Brown for the Public Administration Review noted that this program contributed to modest positive improvements in communities that were affected by these grants, but that there was little evidence grants would have long term positive benefits beyond the grant period.
Transitional Housing Grant Program	The Transitional Housing Assistance Program Grant for Victims of Domestic Violence, Dating Violence, Stalking, or Sexual Assault Program (Transitional Housing Assistance Program) aims to move victims to permanent housing by creating well-rounded, victim-centered transitional housing programs. Besides these specifically mentioned grant programs, the Senate bill that enacted the Violence Against Women Act also created National Domestic Violence Hotline and provided grants for police training and other additional training in the judicial system. The bill also reassessed current laws on prosecuting domestic violence, sexual assault and stalking and provided for the creation of new laws to address gaps in jurisdiction. According to the non-profit Break the Cycle, the community focus of many of these grants has made the legislation influential in improving services, advocacy, and responses by criminal justice across the country.

=== Formerly authorized grant programs ===
Activities previously funded by these grant programs are supported by the Consolidated Youth Program.

Name	Description
Court Training and Improvements Program	This program is designed to improve the United States' court system by awarding grant money for a period of 36 months by the creation of either a Sexual Assault or a Domestic Violence Docket, a Dedicated Sexual Assault or a Domestic Violence Court, or Specialized Court Enhancement. Additionally, courts may apply for funding for Judicial Education or Staff Training for a budget period of 24 months to allow their staff to better address dating violence, sexual assault, domestic violence and stalking issues.
Engaging Men and Youth Program	This program supports projects that create public education campaigns and community organizing to encourage men and boys to work as allies with women and girls to prevent sexual assault, domestic violence, dating violence, and stalking. According to Futures Without Violence, one of the recipients of this grant, this program will focus on the role that men hold in preventing (both directly and indirectly) violence against women by being their allies and supporters." In April 2011, the Department of Justice announced there would be $6.9 million in grants awarded to 23 projects. These initiatives were proposed by non-profit, state, and governmental institutions as a part of "OVW's ongoing commitment to support gender and culturally specific education on healthy relationships and strengthen existing community outreach efforts to men and boys"
Children and Youth Exposed to Violence Grant Program	The Violence Against Women Act of 2005 authorized the use of $20 million for the fiscal years 2007–2011 for the Children and Youth Exposed to Violence Grant program. This program specifically targets children: it is designed to decrease the effects that domestic violence, dating violence, sexual assault, and stalking may have on youth, and lessen the risks of their future victimization. By supporting programs that provide "direct counseling, advocacy, or mentoring ", and coordinating programs that refer families and children to direct services and service providers, the Children and Youth Exposed to Violence Grant Program aims to help "[v]ictim service providers, tribal nonprofit organizations, and community-based organizations."
Safe Havens: Supervised Visitation and Safe Exchange Grant Program	The Supervised Visitation and Safe Exchange Grant Program helps children of victims get the safe environment that they require to grow up emotionally healthy. Because domestic violence can be difficult on children, this program ensures that their safety is of paramount importance.
Services to Advocate for and Respond to Youth Grant Program	By using information from the past and newer modeling techniques, this program aims to optimally respond to victims' needs after trauma. This program was highlighted in the Violence Against Women Act of 2005, which provides for training to prepare those who work with children and young adults to diagnose and treat victims.
Services, Training, Education and Policies (STEP) to Reduce Domestic Violence, Dating Violence, Sexual Assault and Stalking in Secondary Schools Grant Program (STEP)	The Services, Training, Education and Policies program received an appropriation of $5 million from VAWA 2005 for Fiscal Years 2007 through 2011. This program is designed to "support middle and high schools to develop and implement effective training, services, prevention strategies, policies, and coordinated community responses for student victims of domestic violence, dating violence, sexual assault, or stalking " The non-profit organization Break the Cycle notes that Services, Training, Education and Policies in the 2005 Violence Against Women Act will help both middle and high school students, and the schools themselves, to create safe environments for young victims.

Besides these specifically mentioned grant programs, the Senate bill that enacted the Violence Against Women Act also created National Domestic Violence Hotline and provided grants for police training and other additional training in the judicial system. The bill also reassessed current laws on prosecuting domestic violence, sexual assault and stalking and provided for the creation of new laws to address gaps in jurisdiction. According to the non-profit organization Break the Cycle, the community focus of many of these grants has made the legislation influential in improving services, advocacy, and responses by criminal justice across the country.

== Funding criticisms ==
There have been critiques of the Office on Violence Against Women. Generally, the criticisms regard the implementation of the Office on Violence Against Women's programs and how effective the programs have been in actually decreasing domestic violence. While many scholars do not object to the idea of the Violence Against Women Act, some specialists have opinions about to whom, where and how the Office on Violence Against Women should allocate its funding.

A study from the Journal of Marriage and Family stated that the "VAWA does not specifically target funds to areas that are in the greatest need-communities with the most intimate partner violence. Instead of being targeted, such organizations must apply for VAWA funding. Although some effort has been made to distribute funds to reach the high-need areas and to address specific inadequacies, the funding process currently favors existing organizations. However, this may not be the most effective way of reaching communities with the greatest need". The Office on Violence Against Women has taken this criticism under consideration, and is currently in the process of finding new strategies to improve in these areas.

Other critics postulate that the VAWA does not allocate enough resources to men who suffer from domestic violence. There are claims that the Office on Violence Against Women portrays women as the only victims of domestic violence, dating violence, sexual assault, and stalking, while men are solely perpetrators of these crimes. The CDC offers that 13.8% of males have reported abuse, but supporting organizations of the Violence Against Women Act, such as the NNEDV, posit that that number has actually increased up to 37%. Others, including Connie Morella for the National Council of Jewish Women, have said that the Violence Against Women Act does not allocate enough funds or provide assistance to immigrant women, who they say often cannot receive state or federal assistance because of their status. Concerned Women for America believe that the Office on Violence Against Women should do more to promote a better image of marriage and healthy relationships and focus on real abuse crimes, instead of using the VAWA to expand the meaning of domestic violence to more trivial cases and leaving less monetary funding and judiciary assistance for the 'real' victims. At present, the Office on Violence Against Women's definition of domestic violence encompasses all forms of abuse, including those of an emotional, economic, psychological, physical and sexual nature.

The reauthorization of the Violence Against Women Act on February 28, 2013 was achieved despite some significant controversy in regards to the new provisions of the Act that include the LGBT community, Native Tribes, and undocumented immigrants. Twenty-two members of the U.S. House of representatives opposed the reauthorization because of the additional provision that protects those minority communities. However, according to the Centers for Disease Control and Prevention, partners in homosexual relationships say that they have encountered similar or greater levels of domestic violence in their lifetime than their straight counterparts. The 2013 re-authorization of the Violence Against Women Act proved to be more challenging than its last re-authorization in 2005, but the achieved changes focus mostly in who the Violence Against Women Act will now protect and how much money the Act allocates for helping those additional groups.

== Challenges ==
=== Mandatory arrest laws ===
While Congress was preparing to reauthorize Violence Against Women Act in 2013, Time published an article arguing that "[d]omestic violence is still a severely under-reported crime and some critics say mandatory arrest policies have exacerbated this problem." Furthermore, in Time Magazine the author concluded that "mandatory arrest laws remove the preferences of abused women from a process that can leave them financially strapped and worried that the state will take custody of their children."

The mandatory arrest policies were established in the original 1994 version of the Violence Against Women Act. These policies encouraged law enforcement to make arrests and move forward with domestic violence cases without the cooperation of victims. Contrary to what Time Magazine states about mandatory arrest provisions, the provisions were removed from Violence Against Women Act in 2000. While reviewing and reauthorizing the Violence Against Women Act in 2000, Congress changed from "encourage mandatory arrest" policies to "encourage arrest" policies instead, which focus on arresting based on probable cause.

=== Definition of violence ===
In April 2018, OVW changed its definitions of “domestic violence” and “sexual assault." Previously, under the Obama administration, OVW had recognized "forms of emotional, economic, or psychological abuse" within the definition of domestic violence, according to Natalie Nanasi of the Southern Methodist University Dedman School of Law. Now, under the Trump administration, only physical harm that could be prosecuted as a misdemeanor or felony can be considered by OVW as domestic violence. Similarly, whereas sexual assault had previously been defined by OVW as any sexual contact occurring "without the explicit consent of the recipient," now it is limited to only those acts that are already specifically prohibited by "Federal, tribal, or State law." According to Nanasi, the restrictive definitions inhibit OVW from pursuing broader policies to solve the problems of domestic violence and sexual assault.

== See also ==
- Dating violence
- Domestic violence
- Post-assault treatment of sexual assault victims
- Rape
- Sexual assault
- Stalking
- United States Associate Attorney General
- United States Department of Justice
- Violence Against Women Act
- Women's rights
