= National Campus Climate Survey =

The National Campus Climate Survey (NCCS) is a service offered to institutions of higher education in the United States who would like to better understand and improve their campus climate with regards to sexual assault and related topics. The study is designed to:

1. Meet all state and federal requirements for the conduct of sexual assault surveys.
2. Provide a scientifically rigorous survey instrument to help schools learn about the campus climate concerning sexual misconduct.
3. Provide varying survey implementation tiers to match institutions' varying needs for defensible data.
4. Provide a benchmarking tool to allow institutions to compare their results against other participating institutions, and where possible, peer groups.

The National Campus Climate Survey was developed at the University of Michigan in collaboration with a local survey research firm, SoundRocket (formerly known as Survey Sciences Group, LLC)

The study was developed in response to the report from the White House Task Force to Protect Students from Sexual Assault.

== The National Campus Climate Survey ==
=== Study Website & Enrollment ===
The National Campus Climate Survey launched its service and website (www.nationalcampusclimatesurvey.com) on September 1, 2015, and enrolled institutions of higher education for Spring 2016 data collection.

=== Study Design ===
The core NCCS design uses a sample survey approach rather than a census of all students. (However, schools will have the option to conduct a census if they wish.) A randomly selected sample of students (undergraduates and graduates) allowed the study to make scientifically based inferences to the population as a whole, helped focus finite research resources on successfully contacting and encouraging the participation of the broadest group of students, and reduced survey burden on an often over-surveyed population.

The NCCS requested sample data from university registrars (i.e. gender, race/ethnicity, year in school, on/off campus residence) in addition to contact information to allow for nonresponse analyses to be conducted. If deemed appropriate, the NCCS may generate nonresponse bias weights for the final analytic data file.

The NCCS was implemented as a web-based, mobile-optimized survey, to ensure the data collected is of highest quality. Logical branching and filters were used to tailor the questionnaire appropriately for each individual. Data collection included at least four email contacts, and may include mailed prenotification letters, telephone calls, and in-person visits (depending on the service level selected). Data was collected between January and April, 2016.

=== Service Levels ===
The NCCS has a three-tiered service structure, designed to meet the specific needs of the local campus.

	Tier 1: Campus Climate Pro	Tier 2: Campus Climate Pro Methods	Tier 3: Campus Climate Pro Comprehensive
Response Rate Goal	Up to 30%	10-20% higher than Tier 1	Achieved 67% at U-M Spring 2015
Scientific Sample Size	n=4,000	n=3,000	n=2,000

More specifics regarding the Tier services are available on the study website service levels page.

=== Survey Instrument ===
The survey instrument and methodology were designed by a team, led by the University of Michigan's Survey Research Center and including representatives from Student Life at the University of Michigan, the Office of the General Counsel at the University of Michigan, and SoundRocket. The team designed the survey measurements to include both the prevalence and incidence of sexual assault on campus, as well as perceptions of campus climate. The methodological team drew heavily upon behavioral-specific questions from the Sexual Experiences Survey to measure the prevalence and incidence of sexual assault, because such questions have been researched and validated. (1) The design features of this survey have demonstrated effectiveness in minimizing response errors in web surveys, as well as minimizing overall respondent burden. (2) The average length for completion of the survey instrument is less than 15 minutes.

An early draft of the survey instrument is available at the University of Michigan 2015 Campus Climate Surveys Regarding Sexual Misconduct page.
