= Jennifer Klein =

Jennifer Klein may refer to:

- Jennifer Klein (academic), American professor at Yale University
- Jennifer Klein (footballer) (born 1999), Austrian footballer
- Jennifer Klein (public official) (born 1965), American director of the White House Gender Policy Council
- Jennifer Klein (soccer coach) (born 1984), American soccer coach
