= Lynn Rosenthal =

- Education: Florida State University (B.S.W.); Ohio University (M.P.A.)
- Occupations: Policy maker, expert, activist, consultant
- Years active: 1988–present
- Employer: U.S. Department of Health and Human Services
- Organizations: The Center for Family Safety and Healing (President); Biden Foundation (Former Director of Violence Against Women Initiatives)
- Known for: First White House Advisor on Violence Against Women
- Notable work: Violence Against Women policy and advocacy
- Term: 2009–2015
- Predecessor: Position established

Lynn Rosenthal is an American policy maker, activist, and consultant on gender-based violence, sexual assault, and domestic violence who served in both the Obama and Biden Administrations. Vice President Joe Biden appointed her to be the first ever White House advisor on violence against women in 2009. Rosenthal later served as the deputy assistant secretary for the Office of Population Affairs and the director of the Office of Adolescent Health. At the Department of Health and Human Services, Rosenthal was the director of sexual violence and gender-based violence. Rosenthal worked as president of The Center for Family Safety and Healing. Rosenthal also had worked as the director of Violence Against Women Initiatives for the Biden Foundation in 2017.

== Education and Background ==
Born and raised in New Mexico, Rosenthal holds a bachelor's degree in social work from Florida State University and a Master's degree in public administration from Ohio University. When she was fifteen, an older teenager who was a friend of her family repeatedly sexually assaulted her.

== Activism ==
Rosenthal began her career working on reproductive halth as a health educator, clinic administrator, and community organizer in Florida. She then became the director of a local violence shelter and rape crisis center in Florida. Rosenthal has specialized knowledge about the links between domestic violence and housing, state and local collaborative community responses, federal policy, and survived-centered activism.

From 1988-1992, Rosenthal represented North Florida Women's Health & Counseling Services, an outpatient women's health center providing reproductive health care. While congruently serving as the executive director, Rosenthal acted as the clinic's media spokesperson.

From 1992 to 1995, Rosenthal was the Executive Director for Refuge House, a battered women's and rape crisis center in North Florida serving eight counties. Her leadership improved the center's community reputation and financial stability. Rosenthal increased their United Way funding by 50%. Rosenthal founded a sexual violence outreach program to serve three rural counties in North Florida while director.

=== Domestic violence coalitions ===
From 1995 to 1999, Rosenthal directed the Florida Coalition Against Domestic Violence, comprising 38 domestic violence centers serving over 74,000 people. Rosenthal participated in the alliance and task force development as well as advocating in the legislature. As director, she served as the media spokesperson and grew funding from $400,000 to $2.6 million. Rosenthal created new models of service for rural domestic violence shelters and developed innovative legal strategies. Rosenthal's first appearance on C-SPAN was for a 1999 Congressional News Conference representing the Florida Coalition Against Domestic Violence. In this appearance, Rosenthal discussed gun control legislation in the context of domestic and family violence, urging the Republican-controlled Congress to approve gun control legislation.

Lynn Rosenthal, the Executive Director for National Network to End Domestic Violence, served as a witness in the Judiciary Committee in Congress for the Reauthorization of the Violence Against Women Act

While serving as the executive director of the New Mexico Coalition Against Domestic Violence, Rosenthal took on the role of media spokesperson. She coordinated the collaboration of over thirty domestic violence centers from July 2008 to June 2009. Rosenthal represented the Coalition in the New Mexico State legislature. Her efforts in the coalition elevated the capacity of domestic violence centers through technical assistance and training.

Serving as the executive director for the National Network to End Domestic Violence (2000-2006), Rosenthal represented 54 state and territorial domestic violence coalitions in Congress which collectively included over 2000 local domestic violence initiatives. As executive director, Rosenthal outreached to corporate leaders to fundraise initiatives to address violence against women. In 2000 and 2005, Rosenthal was involved in reviving the Violence Against Women Act, speaking as the Executive Director of the National Network to End Domestic Violence as a witness in the Senate Judiciary Committee. After its reauthorization, Rosenthal aided communities to implement the federal legislation.

== White House Advisor ==
In July 2009, President Barack Obama and vice president Joe Biden named Rosenthal the first ever White House Advisor on Violence Against Women in the United States. In Rosenthal's appointment speech, Biden described Rosenthal as "passionate about these issues and knows them backwards and forwards. And as a former director of a shelter, she's also seen the human face of this tragic problem. She will be a leader in this White House in stopping the violence and sexual assault of women and will be an integral part of this Administration." She also served as a senior advisor to Vice President Biden holding both these positions until 2015. For five years, Rosenthal collaborated with Biden to reduce domestic violence and sexual violence. Rosenthal led initiatives to address sexual violence, reduce domestic violence homicides, and address HIV/AIDS health disparities. Similar to her work in earlier positions, Rosenthal pushed for preventing teen dating violence and improving workplace responses to gender-based violence. As a White House Advisor, she wrote for the White House blog for five years. Her policy work and persistence led to improvements to the Violence Against Women Act.

Through her policy making work, Rosenthal chaired and co-chaired several task forces and councils to further her life's work in addressing sexual and domestic violence. One opportunity that Rosenthal gained through this position was representing Biden on the White House Council on Women and Girls. Rosenthal also co-chaired the Federal Interagency Working Group on HIV/AIDS and Violence Against Women. Rosenthal and Biden co-chaired the White House Task Force to Protect Students from Sexual Assault. The Task Force's primary mission was to work with agencies to coordinate a federal response to campus rape and sexual assault. She acted as a key advisor for the task force's recommendations to Barack Obama.

== Advocacy ==
From March 2019 to December 2022, Rosenthal served as the President for The Center for Family Safety and Healing at Nationwide Children's Hospital in Columbus, Ohio. In this role, Rosenthal maintained relationships with various with local activists and community partners, such as the Franklin County Children's Service, Columbus Division of Police, Columbus City Prosecutor Office, Ohio Domestic Violence Network, and CHOICES for Victims of Domestic Violence. These partnerships were part of Rosenthal's unique strategy of unifying diverse groups to address family violence.

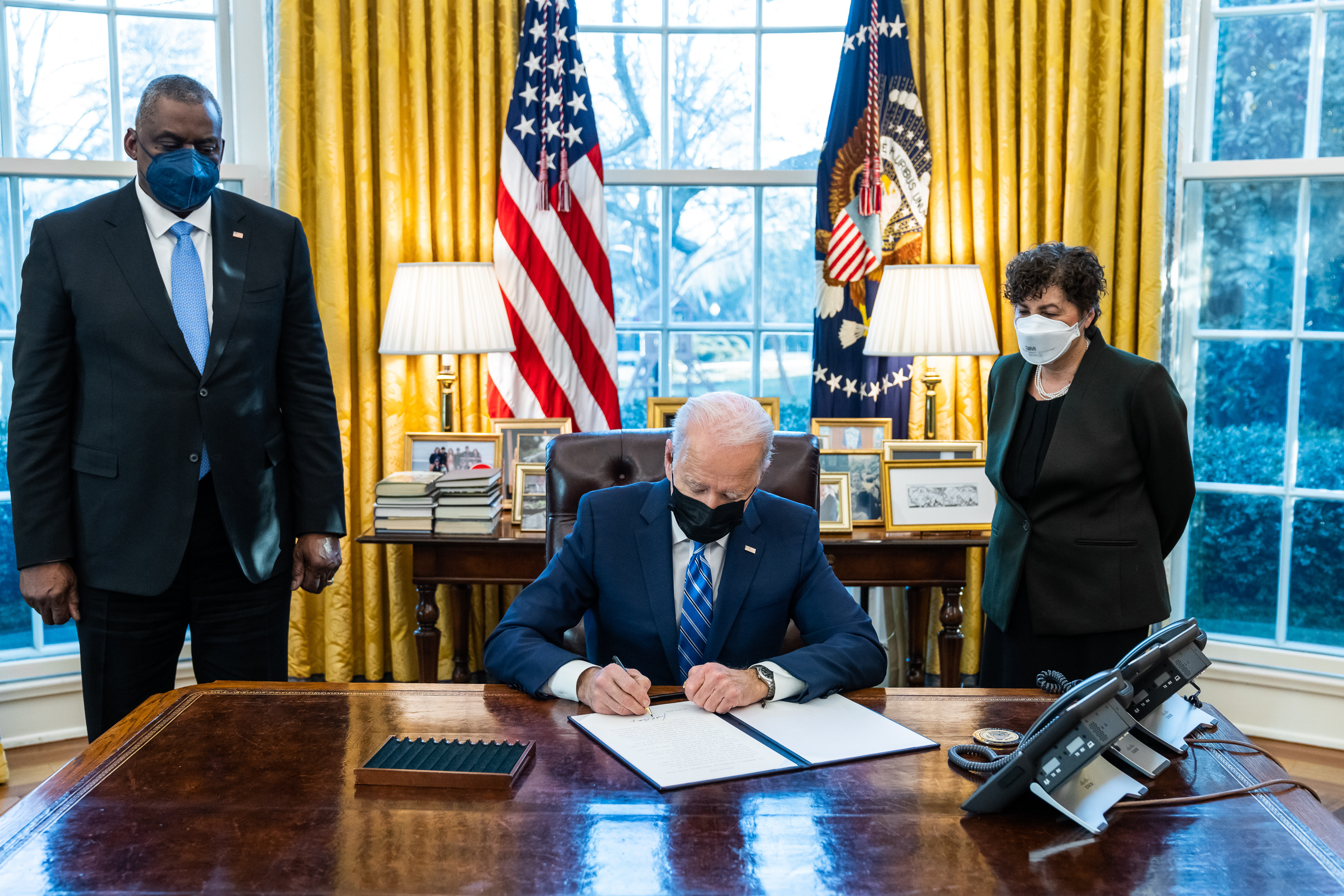
President Joe Biden, joined by Defense Secretary Lloyd Austin and Chair of the Independent Review Commission on Military Sexual Assault Lynn Rosenthal, signs an executive order for 2022 Amendments to the Manual for Courts-Martial, strengthening the military justice system's response to gender-based violence, Wednesday, January 26, 2022, in the Oval Office.

Another opportunity for Rosenthal to address sexual violence and make policy recommendations arose under President Biden's administration in 2021. The Secretary of Defense Lloyd J. Austin III ordered a 90-day Independent Review Commission on Military Sexual Assault to make policy recommendations to address sexual assault and harassment in the U.S. military, and he appointed Lynn Rosenthal as the IRC chair. While Rosenthal was Chair of the Independent Review Commission on Military Sexual Assault, it made 82 recommendations for accountability, prevention, climate and culture, and victim care and support. Rosenthal's efforts saw success in July 2021 when president Joe Biden endorsed the Secretary of Defense's announcement to accept the core recommendations created by the IRC. Specifically, the president thanked Rosenthal for leading the IRC in addition to her life's work to end gender-based violence and sexual violence. The adopted policy recommendations removed the investigation and prosecution of sexual assault from the chain of command and created specialized units to handle sexual violence cases and crimes. With the help of Rosenthal's policy expertise, sexual assault crimes occurring in the U.S. military were from then on out prosecuted under the Uniform Code of Military Justice.

External Videos
- Lynn Rosenthal, November 5, 1999 - c. January 1, 2001, C-SPAN
- Lynn Rosenthal, National Network to End Domestic Violence, August 29, 2001, C-SPAN
- Adviser, Women's Outreach and Initiatives Office, White House February 1, 2009, C-SPAN
- Adviser, Violence Against Women, White House, Lynn Rosenthal, January 1, 2011, C-SPAN
- Chair, Independent Review Commission on Sexual Assault in the Military, Department of Defense, February February 26, 202 C-SPAN

While she served as the IRC chair, Rosenthal appeared before the House Armed Services Subcommittee's Hearing on Sexual Assault in the Military. Rosenthal spoke on behalf of the IRC and presented a joint statement in testimony to the House Armed Services Subcommittee. She clarified that since leadership is so important in the military structure, the reforms recommended by the IRC targeted leadership specifically. She also stated that changing the military justice system alone will not reduce sexual assault without investing in preventing, improving command climates, and enhancing victim care.

After Rosenthal's White House service, she acted as the vice president for strategic partnerships for the National Domestic Violence Hotline. The hotline provides 24/7 access to resources and support specifically serving teen and young adult relationships. In other advocacy work, Rosenthal began working as the Director of Sexual and Gender-based Violence at the U.S. Department of Health and Human Services in 2022. Her responsibilities include leads the department to implement the National Plan to End Gender-based Violence. Since July 2024 as deputy assistant, Rosenthal oversees sexual and reproductive health services. The Office of Population Affairs that Rosenthal oversees provides services to advance health outcomes and adolescent health and wellbeing.

=== Consulting ===
As a consultant in Washington D.C., Rosenthal focuses on collecting knowledge and bringing innovation together to build movement-based organizations. Schools, government agencies, and services providers are the focus for Rosenthal's policy developments. Her goal is to improve responses to domestic violence and sexual assault and end the conditions allowing the violence to occur.

== Distinctions ==
In 1999, the Florida Governor's Peace at Home Award was given to Rosenthal for her impact on the lives of abused women and children. In 2005, Doris Buffet's National Sunshine Lady Foundation distinguished Rosenthal to honor her contributions to the Violence Against Women Act. Additionally, Rosenthal was the first recipient of the National Advocacy Award given by the Sheila Wellstone Institute in 2006. In 2023, Rosenthal gave the opening welcome speech at the National Sexual Assault Conference.

== Publications ==
- "Availability of Family Violence Services for Military Service Members and Their Families" RAND Corporation, November 25, 2019.
- "Lynn Rosenthal: A Call to Action.” In West Wingers: Stories from the Dream Chasers, Change Makers, and Hope Creators Inside the Obama White House, 2018.
