= It's On Us =

Anti-sexual assault movement in the United States

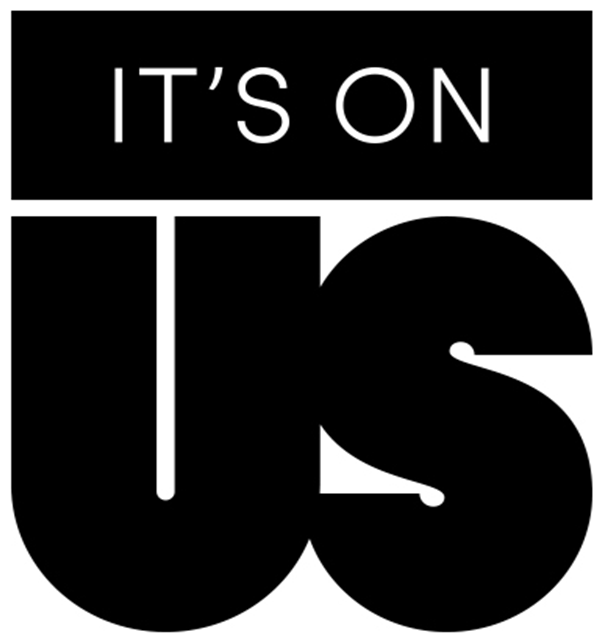
It's On Us Logo

"It's On Us" (to stop sexual assault) is a social movement created by Barack Obama and White House Council on Women and Girls to raise awareness and fight against sexual assault on United States college campuses for both men and women. This campaign urges the public to stand up against sexual assault and step away from the sidelines to be an active part of the solution.

According to the statistics provided by It's On Us, 1 in 5 college females and 1 in 20 college males are sexually assaulted.

== Background ==
Started on September 19, 2014, the It's On Us campaign was put into motion with the intent of ending sexual assault on college campuses. On this release date, they also published a YouTube video with many famous celebrities taking a stand against sexual assault. Each year, It's On Us selects student leaders across the country to serve as part of the It's On Us National Student Advisory Committee. The Advisory Committee is in its third year.

=== Legal ===
The Campus Crime Statistics Act was passed in 1990 forcing public campuses to share information regarding crime and their efforts to improve the safety within and around campus. It's On Us brings awareness to the information and numbers shared in these reports.

== Social ==
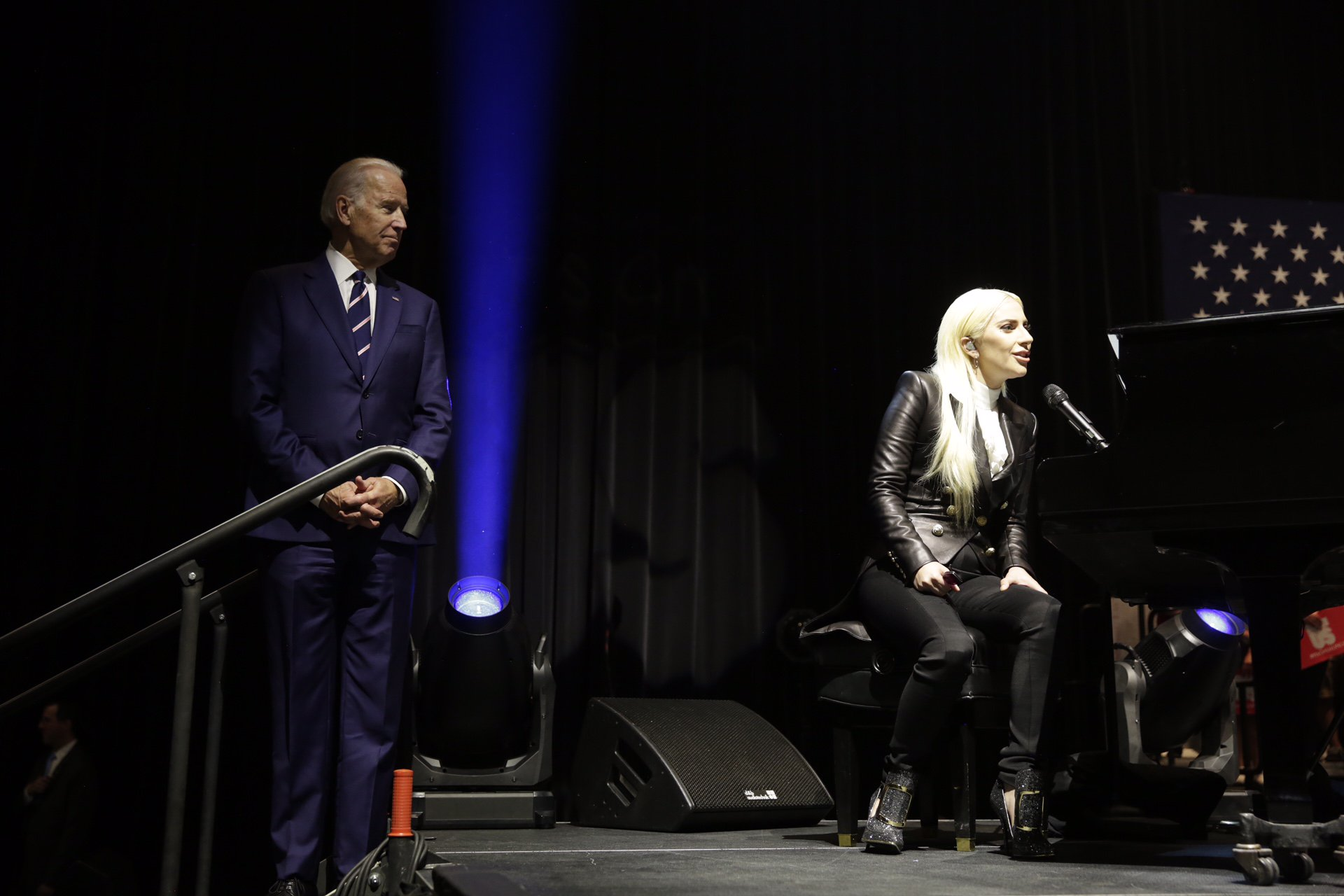
Joe Biden and Lady Gaga at an It's On Us event at the University of Las Vegas in 2016

It's On Us has utilized multiple social media platforms to increase awareness for sexual assault including Facebook, Twitter, Instagram, YouTube, etc. The hashtag #itsonus is used to create awareness about the campaign to stop sexual assault.

In the year end summary report for 2015, It's On Us stated that, "students have launched... campaigns at over 300 schools and hosted more than 650 events". They also stated that, "since the launch... almost 220,000 people have taken the pledge." They also have gained 90 partners over the duration.

In 2015, It's On Us released a public service announcement titled "The One Thing". The announcement focused on consent when engaging in sexual acts. They also stated that this PSA would be released to more than 20,000 media outlets nationwide.

On February 28, 2016, Lady Gaga took sexual abuse survivors on stage while performing "Til It Happens to You" at the 88th Academy Awards for It's On Us. It's On Us reported 37,401 new pledges and the hashtag #itsonus reached 348.67 million impressions.

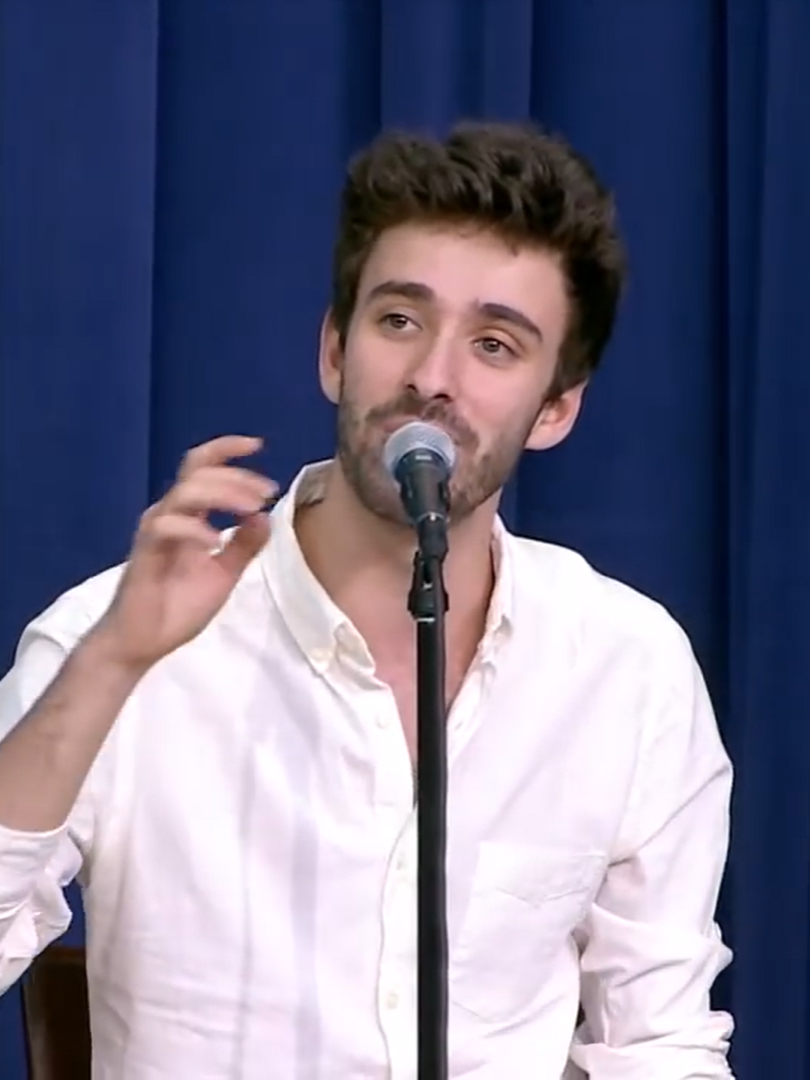
Jack Met from AJR singing "It's On Us" at the White House

On March 31, 2017, the American indie-pop trio AJR released a charity single of the same name in support of the campaign, and all the proceeds from the song were donated to It's On Us. The band released an encouraging statement regarding the campaign, saying: "When we heard about the amazing work It’s On Us is doing to create an environment to support survivors and change the way [to] think about and talk about sexual assault, we knew we wanted to be part of this conversation the best way we knew how – by writing a song."

=== YouTube ===
One of their most popular forms of social reach is through YouTube videos. The campaigns has created numerous videos with celebrities advocating against sexual assault.

Joe Biden and Adam Devine also took part in a Funny or Die video, in which they crash a college party and show how to prevent potential sexual assault.

=== Goals ===
The goals of this organization are:

1. To RECOGNIZE that non-consensual sex is sexual assault.

2. To IDENTIFY situations in which sexual assault may occur.

3. To INTERVENE in situations where consent has not or cannot be given.

4. To CREATE an environment in which sexual assault is unacceptable and survivors are supported."

5. The organization is geared towards creating a social movement by asking people to take a "PLEDGE" against sexual assault."

=== Supporters ===
Supporters of this organization include: Kerry Washington, Zoe Saldaña, Nina Dobrev, Matt McGorry, John Cho, Jon Hamm, Connie Britton, and others. They have an extensive list of collegiate supporters, such as universities, fraternities and sororities.

=== Impact ===
For It's On Us week 2016, according to a Twitter poll of Ole Miss Students, "43 percent of Ole Miss students are well aware of the university-provided resources available to victims of sexual assault, compared to the 25 percent who say they are not".
