= Executive Order 14020 =

Executive order by President Joe Biden

- "Establishment of the White House Gender Policy Council"
- Front page of Executive Order 14020
- Type: Executive order
- Number: 14020
- President: Joe Biden
- Signed: March 8, 2021

Federal Register details
- Federal Register document number: 2021-05183
- Publication date: March 8, 2021

Summary
- The creation of the White House Gender Policy Council.

Executive Order 14020, officially titled Establishment of the White House Gender Policy Council, was signed on March 8, 2021, and is the 36th executive order signed by U.S. President Joe Biden. The order established the White House Gender Policy Council.

== Provisions ==
The purpose of this order is to achieve gender equality and promote equal rights in the United States and worldwide. This order is a strategic objective designed to reduce poverty and foster economic growth in the US with the purpose of encouraging gender equality in employment. The council is responsible for the establishment of policies to fight systematic prejudices and sexual harassment. The aim of the Order is to enhance economic security by eliminating structural obstacles to the involvement of women in the workforce and by reducing the salary and wealth disparity.

== See also ==
- List of executive actions by Joe Biden
- 2020 United States census
