= Abigail Borah =

American environmental activist (born c. 1990)

- Born: 1990 (age 35–36); Near Princeton, New Jersey, U.S.
- Citizenship: American
- Education: Middlebury College (BA in Conservation Biology)
- Occupation: Environmental activist
- Known for: Interrupting Todd Stern at the 2011 United Nations Climate Change Conference; co-founding Race to Replace Vermont Yankee

Abigail Borah (born c. 1990) is an American environmental activist who interrupted Todd Stern at the 2011 United Nations Climate Change Conference and who co-founded Race to Replace Vermont Yankee.

== Early life and education ==
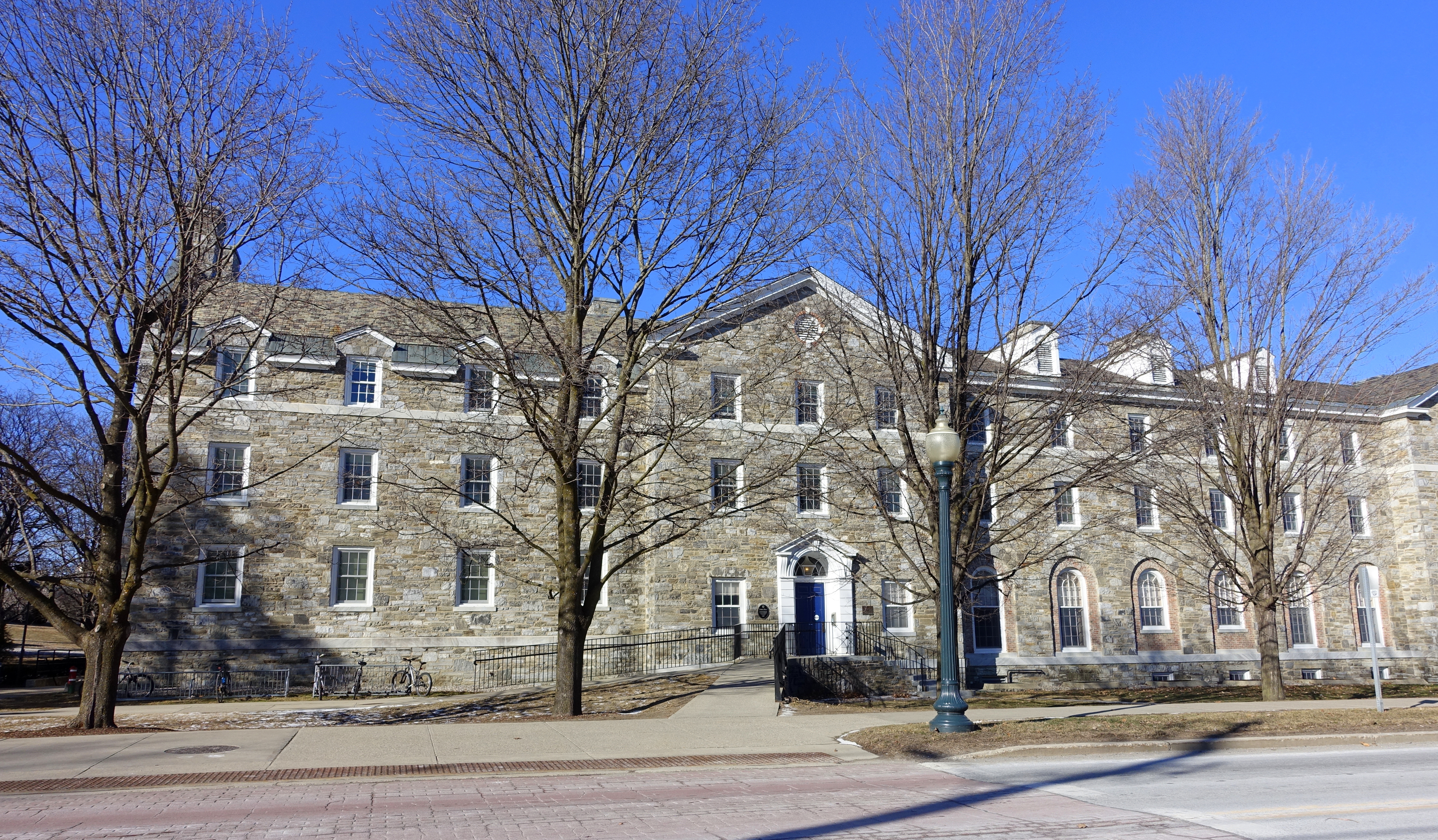
Middlebury College

Borah grew up near Princeton and attended Stuart Country Day School of the Sacred Heart.

Borah studied at Middlebury College, where she majored in Conservation Biology. While studying, she joined SustainUS, which sent her to the 2010 United Nations Climate Change Conference in Cancun (also known as COP-16).

== Activism and career ==
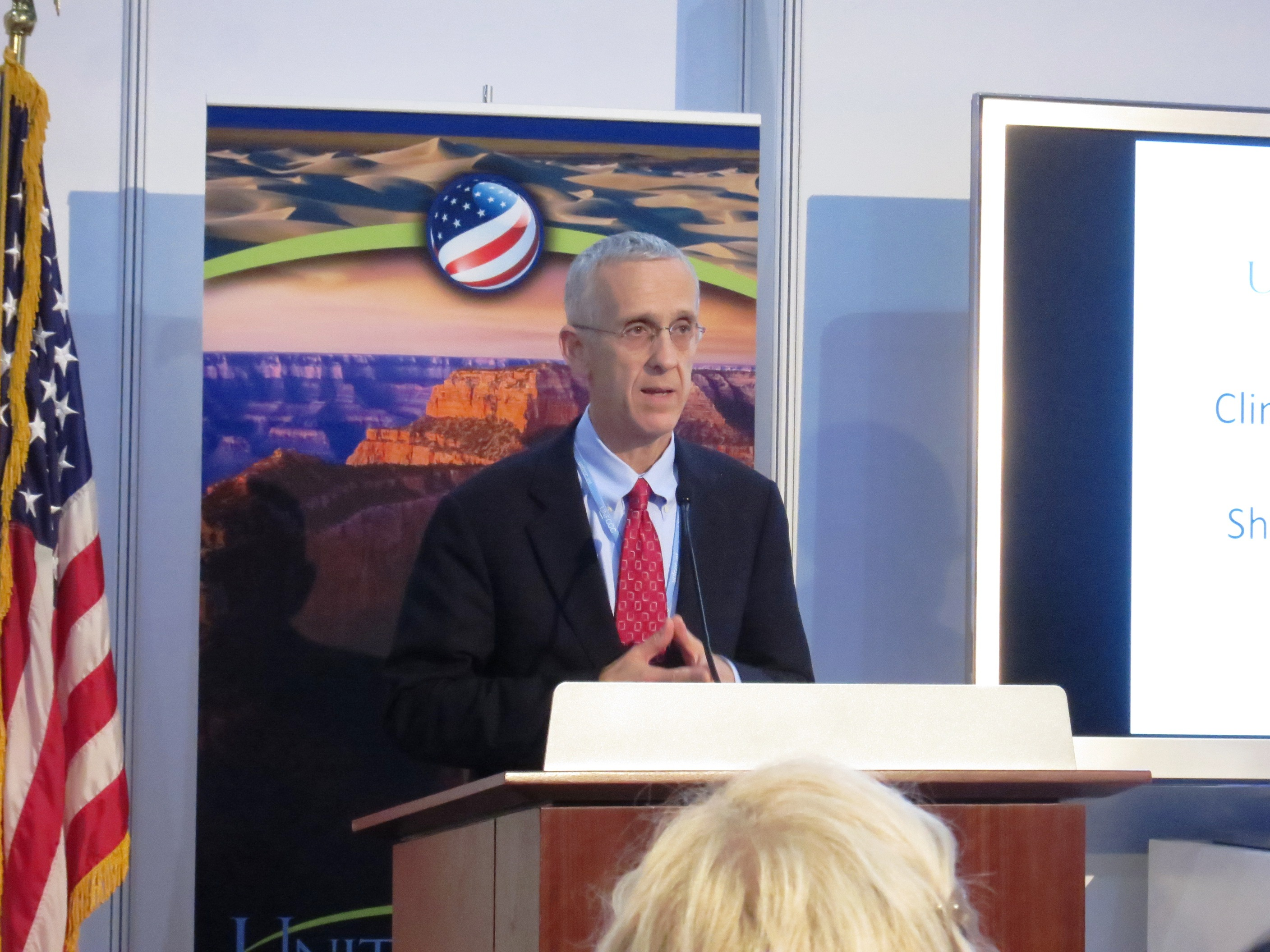
Todd Stern at COP18 in Doha, 2012

In 2011, when she was 21 years old, Borah interrupted US negotiator Todd Stern at the 2011 United Nations Climate Change Conference (COP-17) in Durban to say:

“I am speaking on behalf of the United States of America because my negotiators cannot. I am scared for my future. 2020 is too late to wait.”

Borah received applause from the audience and had her credentials allowing her to attend the conference removed by guards. Stern later conceded that he agreed with her points. She was later dubbed the "Durban Climate Hero" by Climate Progress.

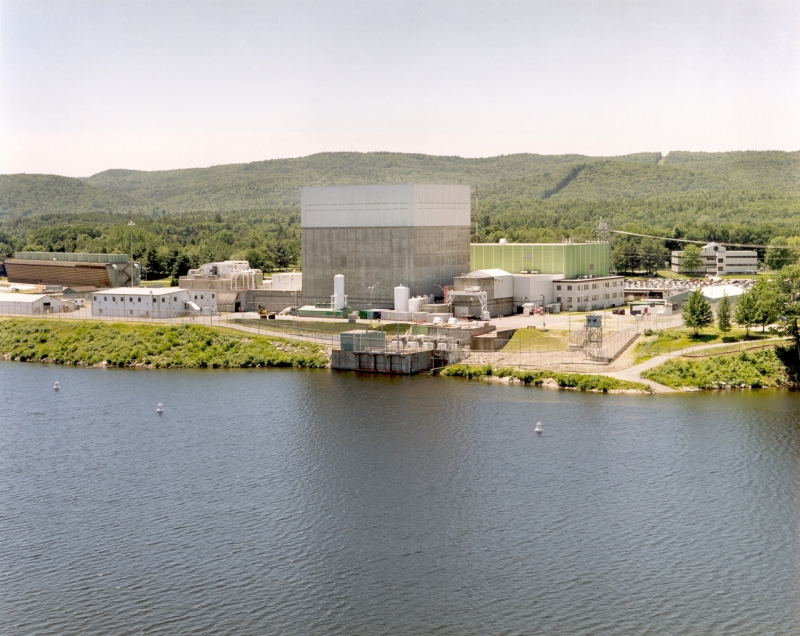
Vermont Yankee Nuclear Power Plant

Borah is the co-founder of Race to Replace Vermont Yankee, a campaign that aims to replace nuclear power in Vermont with clean energy.

== See also ==
- Emily Cunningham
- Julia Butterfly Hill
- Nicole Hernandez Hammer
