= Todd Stern =

American lawyer

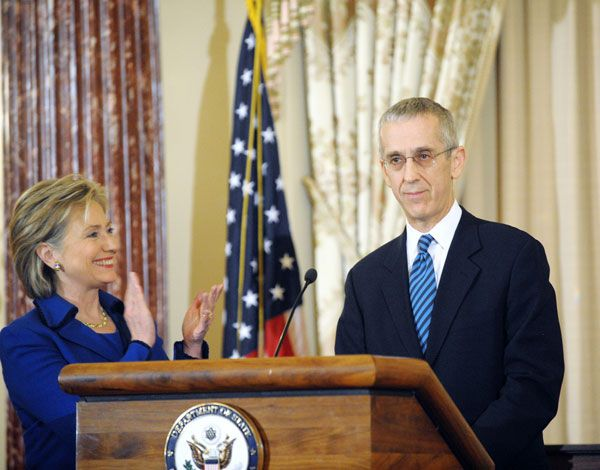

United States Special Envoy for Climate Change
- In office January 26, 2009 – April 1, 2016
- President: Barack Obama
- Preceded by: Position established
- Succeeded by: Jonathan Pershing

White House Staff Secretary
- In office June 30, 1995 – March 11, 1998
- President: Bill Clinton
- Preceded by: John Podesta
- Succeeded by: Phillip Caplan

Personal details
- Born: May 4, 1951 (age 75) Chicago, Illinois, U.S.
- Party: Democratic
- Spouse: Jennifer L. Klein
- Education: Dartmouth College (BA); Harvard University (JD)

Todd D. Stern (born May 4, 1951) is an American lawyer and diplomat. He served as the United States Special Envoy for Climate Change and was the United States' chief negotiator at the 2015 Paris Climate Agreement.

== Education ==
Stern graduated from Dartmouth College in 1973, and earned a J.D. at Harvard Law School.

== Career ==
Stern served as the United States Special Envoy for Climate Change, leading talks at the United Nations climate change conferences and smaller sessions, appointed by U.S. Secretary of State Hillary Clinton on January 26, 2009. He was the United States' chief negotiator at the 2015 Paris Climate Agreement.

Stern has proposed the creation of the E-8, a novel international group uniting leading developed nations and developing ones for an annual gathering focused on combating global warming.

Stern previously served under the Bill Clinton administration as Assistant to the President and Staff Secretary in the White House from 1993 to 1998, during which time he also acted as the senior White House negotiator at the Kyoto Protocol and Buenos Aires negotiations.

At the 2011 United Nations Climate Change Conference (COP-17) in Durban, Stern was interrupted by Abigail Borah, who accused USA of moving to slowly to tackle climate change.

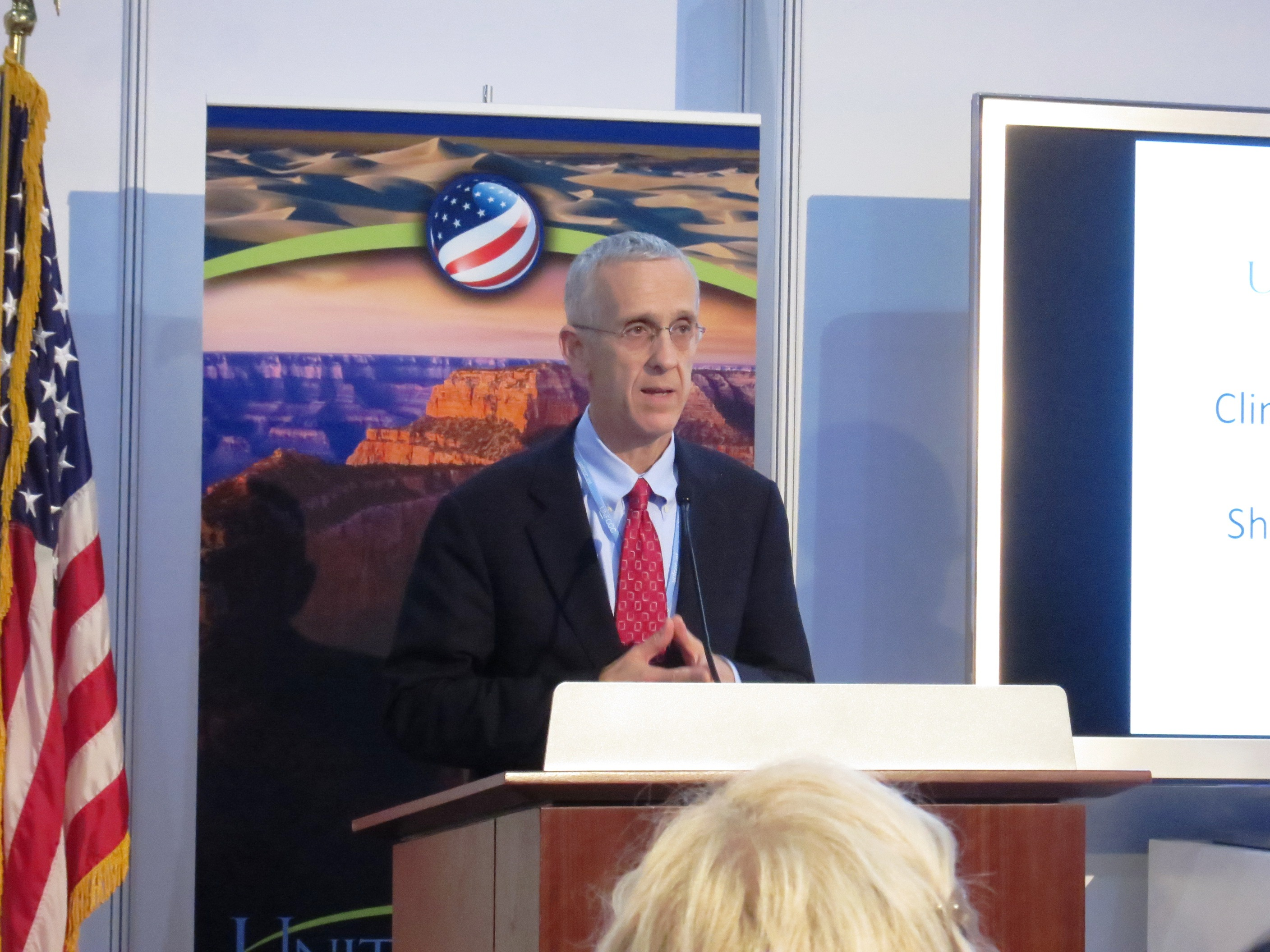
Todd Stern at COP18 in Doha, 2012

== Personal life ==
On 10 September 1995, at the Brooklyn Botanic Garden, Stern married Jennifer Klein, a policy analyst working for the Domestic Policy Council and office of the First Lady.

== See also ==
- Initiative on Global Climate Change

Political offices
Preceded by John Podesta	White House Staff Secretary; 1995–1998	Succeeded by Phillip Caplan
Diplomatic posts
New office	United States Special Envoy for Climate Change; 2009–2016	Succeeded by Jonathan Pershing
