= National Network to End Domestic Violence =

Non-profit organization in the USA

- Abbreviation: NNEDV
- Founded: 1990
- Tax ID no.: 52-1973408
- Legal status: 501(c)(3) nonprofit organization
- Headquarters: Washington, D.C., United States
- Coordinates: 38.909031°N 77.037053°W
- Chair: Jenny Backus
- President, Chief Executive Officer: Deborah J. Vagins
- Executive Vice President: Cindy Southworth
- Revenue: $3,807,937 (2014)
- Expenses: $2,921,894 (2014)
- Employees: 21 (2014)
- Volunteers: 16 (2014)
- Website: www.nnedv.org
- Formerly called: Domestic Violence Coalition on Public Policy

The National Network to End Domestic Violence (NNEDV) is a 501(c)(3) not-for-profit organization founded in 1990, based in the District of Columbia. It is a network of state and territorial domestic violence coalitions, representing over 2,000 member organizations throughout the US. The National Network to End Domestic Violence works to address the many aspects of domestic violence.

== Policy work ==
The National Network to End Domestic Violence performs legislative policy work with all three branches. NNEDV has been called to testify before the U.S. Congress on domestic violence issues to assist state and territorial coalitions in better serving the needs of the victim by presenting research on domestic violence issues for pending legislation. NNEDV works proactively with Congress to make ending domestic violence a national priority.

NNEDV's members are state and territorial coalitions representing domestic violence shelters and programs in every state and territory in the nation. NNEDV works closely with the coalitions to understand the ongoing and emerging needs at the local, state, and territorial level, and then ensures those needs are heard and understood by policymakers at the national level.

Ensuring the funding of domestic violence programs remains a continued concern. NNEDV's policy efforts also focus on gun violence, the technology sector, and economic and financial security.

=== Violence Against Women Act implementation ===
The National Network to End Domestic Violence worked for the 2013 reauthorization of the Violence Against Women Act (VAWA). VAWA closed critical gaps in justice, improved upon lifesaving services and ensuring all domestic violence survivors receive services. NNEDV participated in the Office on Violence Against Women conferral process, sharing information about VAWA's impact on the field, gaps in the federal response, and challenges and successes of implementation.

NNEDV also participated in stakeholder meetings about the implementation of VAWA's Campus SaVE provisions and worked to ensure that the negotiated rule-making committee considered, in particular, the needs of student victims of dating abuse and stalking, as well as the confidentiality and safety needs of student victims. NNEDV also communicated the same messages to the White House Task Force on Campus Sexual Assault. Historically, VAWA was the first piece of federal legislation to specifically provide protections for members of the LGBT community.

NNEDV continues to work to ensure that programs such as the Family Violence Prevention and Services Act and Victims of Crime Act receive adequate funding.

=== Appropriations and funding ===
The National Network to End Domestic Violence leads the national Campaign for Funding to End Domestic and Sexual Violence. Through this work, NNEDV is at the forefront of advocating for increased funding and resources for local programs and state and territorial coalitions. As part of this advocacy, NNEDV coordinates and implements a strategic action plan that combines national level work with grasstops and grassroots mobilization around the federal budget. The primary focus of appropriations advocacy is on increasing funding under the Violence Against Women Act, the Family Violence Prevention Services Act, and the Victims of Crime Act.

=== Gun violence ===
The National Network to End Domestic Violence has emerged as one of the leading organizations for commonsense firearms legislation, specifically, an improved and expanded background check system. The clear connection to this work—preventing domestic violence homicides—has helped to build momentum around such legislation. NNEDV advocates for closing loopholes in the background checks system and for needed improvements to data collection through NICS. NNEDV continues to work with Everytown for Gun Safety (formerly Mayors Against Illegal Guns), as well as with other national organizations, to provide critical information and targeted action alerts to the field around proposed legislation to address gun violence.

NNEDV hosted a webinar with coalitions on gun violence and conducted a thorough review of state- and territory-level domestic violence homicide data, as well as information about lethality assessment programs and fatality review teams in the states and territories. NNEDV won a significant victory on this issue under the United States Supreme Court decision in U.S. v. Castleman, where the Court upheld a definition under the law that will continue to prohibit convicted domestic violence abusers from possessing firearms. NNEDV's amicus curiae brief in the case, which outlined the importance of upholding this protection through a common-sense interpretation of the law, was referenced by the Supreme Court.

=== Sexual Assault Nurse Examiners Act (SANEs) ===
In February 2022, ANA partnered with Congresswoman Deborah Ross and Congressman Dave Joyce to introduce the Sexual Assault Nurse Examiners (SANEs) Act, which is designed to address the nationwide shortage of Sexual Assault Nurse Examiners (SANEs) and improve care for survivors of sexual violence. It bill was also endorsed by the American Nurses Association and RAINN.

== Amicus briefs ==
=== Commonwealth v. Claybrook ===
In February 2013, the National Network to End Domestic Violence signed onto an amicus curiae brief filed in the case Commonwealth v. Claybrook. This case involved three men who sexually assaulted a college freshman in her dorm room. A Pennsylvania jury convicted the men, and the trial court denied their motions for judgment of acquittal and/or a new trial on the charges. The Superior Court overturned the convictions.

The advocates' amicus brief argued that the Superior Court's decision was based on misconceptions and myths about sexual assault, including the victim's supposed insufficient resistance, which was long ago removed as a requirement in Pennsylvania. The Pennsylvania Supreme Court reversed the Superior Court and remanded the case.

=== Souratgar v. Fair ===
The case of Souratgar v. Fair involved the question of whether to remove a child from the custody of his mother and return the child to the custody of his father in Singapore, in a circumstance where the father had been physically and verbally abusive toward the mother, including in the presence of the child. The district court held that the child was not in "grave risk of harm" in living with his father.

The advocates amicus brief argued that this conclusion runs counter to the weight of evidence that children exposed to domestic violence are themselves at serious risk of harm and that both mother and child were continuously abused post-separation from the abuser and that this abuse must be taken seriously.

=== Cromeartie v. RCM of Washington ===
The case of Cromartie v. RCM involved a woman who was fired for allegedly allowing her abusive partner to enter the work site in violation of workplace rules. The case asked whether or not this firing constitutes a separation from employment "due to domestic violence" subject to unemployment compensation. This is the first case requiring interpretation of D.C. Code Section 51-131 in the District of Columbia; it is also the first case in the country on this subject to reach a court of appeals.

The advocates amicus brief argues that her allowing her partner onto the worksite was not truly voluntary but was rather a product of the pattern of coercion and power exerted by her abuser and characteristic of domestic violence.

== Projects ==
=== Domestic Violence Counts: National Census of Domestic Violence Services ===
Conducted since 2006, Domestic Violence Counts: National Census of Domestic Violence Services is an annual noninvasive, unduplicated count of adults and children who seek services from United States domestic violence shelter programs during a single 24-hour survey period. This census takes into account the dangerous nature of domestic violence by using a survey designed to protect the confidentiality and safety of victims. It also allows for a true representation of the gaps in services, and the strain it causes upon US domestic violence shelters.

The tenth annual census report conducted on September 16, 2015, had a 93% participation rate among identified local domestic violence in the United States and territories. The survey reported that during a 24-hour period on the census day, 71,828 victims were served. Among those victims, 40,302 victims found refuge in emergency shelters or transitional housing, and 31,526 adults and children received non-residential assistance and services, including counseling, legal advocacy, and children’s support groups. The survey also reported that there were 12,197 unmet requests for services in one day, with 63% of the unmet need under the housing umbrella.

=== Coalition Capacity Project ===
The Coalition Capacity Project offers technical assistance for coalitions of groups working with survivors, such as organizational and leadership development. An annual roundtable brings coalition leaders together.

=== Safety Net project ===
Founded by Cindy Southworth in 2000 and brought to the National Network to End Domestic Violence in 2002, the Safety Net Project provides training to help community agencies and programs respond to the needs of survivors. The project has trained more than 78,000 advocates, police officers, prosecutors, and other community agency members. The Safety Net Project sits on the advisory boards of Pinterest, Twitter, and Facebook. It has launched a sister SafetyNet in Australia.

=== Positively Safe ===
Developed in 2010, with a grant from the MAC AIDS Foundation, Positively Safe addresses the intersection between HIV/AIDS and domestic violence. Together with the National Domestic Violence & HIV/AIDS Advisory Committee, the National Network to End Domestic Violence developed a curriculum to train service providers in both fields. The curriculum has a large focus on building collaboration to address the intersection and prevent HIV and domestic violence.

In 2013, NNEDV was able to present its curriculum to the President’s Working Group on the Intersection of HIV/AIDS, Violence against Women and Girls, and Gender-Related Health Disparities. Because of NNEDV's ongoing commitment to these issues, the project was funded to provide training to select groups on the intersection.

In 2015 the Positively Safe project launched a toolkit for domestic violence and HIV/AIDS service providers, with resources on safety planning, linkage to retention in care, conversation guides, and more. The project will continue to expand the resources in the toolkit.

=== WomensLaw ===
WomensLaw was founded in February 2000 by a group of lawyers, teachers, advocates and web designers interested in using the Internet to educate survivors of domestic violence about their legal rights and ways to get help. WomensLaw has two components, namely a website and an email hotline. It joined NNEDV in 2010. The website provides legal information related to domestic violence. The email hotline is a service through which victims, friends, family, and advocates can ask questions anonymously.

== Congressional testimony ==
=== 2006 ===
On February 8, 2006, the National Network to End Domestic Violence's staff member Cindy Southworth testified before the Senate Consumer Affairs, Product Safety, and Insurance subcommittee. The hearing focused upon pretexting and phone records.

Southworth's testimony focused upon the necessity of keeping domestic violence survivor's information confidential. Southworth said, "All companies that collect and retain personal information about their customers should enhance the security and privacy options available to consumers, and create levels of security that are not easily breached from within or from outside of the company. Given the creative and persistent tactics of perpetrators, companies must work with consumers to identify the methods of security that will work best for general consumers, as well as methods for consumers in higher-risk situations, including victims of domestic violence and law enforcement officers."

=== 2014 ===
On June 4, 2014, Southworth, representing both the National Network to End Domestic Violence and the Minnesota Council for Battered Women, testified before the Senate Subcommittee on Privacy, Technology, and the Law. Southworth testified in support of Minnesota Senator Al Franken's proposed legislation, The Location Privacy Protection Act of 2014. The bill sought to ban these stalking apps and would require companies to inform consumers when their information is being used and what for what purpose.

Southworth testified that these apps are not covert in their marketing. Calling attention to apps such as HelloSpy, Southworth showed screenshots from the website showing women in various domestic violence situations. In one picture, under the section advertising the importance of catching cheating spouses, a man stands holding a woman's arm tightly while her face shows clear abrasions. This is a pattern among the majority of these alleged spy applications. Southworth testified that "consent is critical...and a reminder that the user's location is being tracked is critical." Southworth also provided additional recommendations on behalf of the organization and stood in firm support of the legislation.

== Staff ==
Deborah J. Vagins has served as the president and chief executive officer of the organization since 2019. Vagins had previously served as Vice President of Policy at the American Association of University Women.

Past presidents of the National Network to End Domestic Violence include Kim Gandy (former vice president of the Feminist Majority Foundation in Virginia), Congresswoman Donna Edwards, Sue Else (current CEO of Girl Scouts of Historic Georgia), and Lynn Rosenthal (former White House Advisor on Violence Against Women).

Cindy Southworth served as Executive Vice President until joining Facebook as Women’s Safety Policy Manager in July 2020.

== History ==
In 1990, the organization was founded as the Domestic Violence Coalition on Public Policy by a group of domestic violence coalitions in order to promote federal legislation related to domestic violence. Along with local, state, territorial, and national domestic violence coalitions, the National Network to End Domestic Violence led the efforts to pass the landmark Violence Against Women Act (VAWA), authored by then-Senator Joe Biden.

On February 25, 1995, after the passage of VAWA, the organization changed its name to the National Network to End Domestic Violence. VAWA's implementation led to NNEDV's work on transitional housing.
