= Nicole Hernandez Hammer =

American climate researcher

Nicole Hernández Hammer
- Born: Nicole Hernández Estrada c. 1975 (age 50–51); Guatemala
- Other names: Nicole Hernandez Hammer; Nicole H. Hammer
- Education: University of South Florida (BS); Palm Beach Atlantic University (MBA); Florida Atlantic University (MS)
- Occupations: Sea-level researcher; Environmental-justice advocate; Climate scientist
- Children: 1 son
- Relatives: Oscar Isaac (brother); Elvira Lind (sister-in-law)
- Scientific career
- Known for: Climate change's Disproportionate impact on low-income neighborhoods and communities of color
- Awards: Great Immigrants Award (2022)
- Fields: Biology; Climatology; Oceanography

Nicole Hernández Hammer (née Hernández Estrada; born c. 1975) is an American sea-level researcher, climate scientist, and environmental-justice advocate, known for her work on the disproportionate impact of climate change on low-income neighborhoods and communities of color.

== Early life and education ==
Nicole Hernández Estrada was born in Guatemala to a Guatemalan mother, María Eugenia Estrada Nicolle, and a Cuban-American father, Óscar Gonzalo Hernández-Cano, a pulmonologist. Hernández has two younger brothers, the actor Oscar Isaac and Mike, a journalist.

As a baby, Hernández's family home in Guatemala City was destroyed by the 1976 Guatemala earthquake. The family later moved to the El Quiché Highlands as part of Hernández's father medical training. In 1979, the family migrated to the United States so that Hernández's father could complete medical residency. The family lived in Randallstown near Baltimore, followed by New Orleans, before settling in Miami. In 1992, Hurricane Andrew destroyed the family's Miami home.

Hernández attended the University of South Florida and earned a bachelor's degree in integrated natural sciences. Hernández then studied for a M.S. in biology at Florida Atlantic University, and an MBA in finance at Palm Beach Atlantic University.

== Career ==
Hernández worked in academia for 15 years before turning to advocacy and public outreach. Hernández taught at both the Florida Atlantic University and University of Southern Florida, and was the deputy director of the Florida Center for Environmental Studies at Florida Atlantic University.

=== Advocacy and public outreach ===
Hernández credits her mother Maria for instilling in her the need to protect the environment, and her upbringing in Southern Florida for her interest in analyzing the interplay between climate change and Hispanic communities. Hernández's advocacy focuses on how climate change disproportionately affects communities of color and low-income communities, and how sea level rise disproportionately affects Latino populations.

In 2012, Hernández was appointed the Florida Coastal Expert for the Union of Concerned Scientists, and later the Southeast Climate Science and Community Advocate. Hernández worked to make climate science more accessible to Latino communities. In 2013, Hernández contributed to the Southeast Climate Consortium (SECC) regional technical input report on the climate of the Southeast United States, for the Third National Climate Assessment.

Hernánde was the Florida field manager for Moms Clean Air Force, and advocated for pollution regulation and children's health. In 2015, Hernández was invited to the State of the Union Address by First Lady Michelle Obama to spread awareness about climate change and its effects on communities of color. The same year, Hammer presented Governor Rick Scott a report on climate change's effects in Florida, yet she was allegedly instructed by his administration to remove all mention of climate change (which he denies). In 2016, Hammer attended the Climate March and spoke to several news networks on how important research funding from the government is for tracking the changes of the earth from climate change.

In June 2016, Hernández spoke at the Democratic National Convention about how climate change is an immediate concern for the country through the effects of rising sea levels on vulnerable Latino communities. She communicated direct immediate actions the government can take to relieve the stresses of rising sea levels and pollution on Latino communities. In 2017, Hernández was on the panel for Amy Poehler's Smart Girls, and spoke about the disproportionate impacts of climate change on communities of color.

In 2020, Hernández became an environmental scientist at UPROSE, a Latino community-based organization in Brooklyn. The same year Hernández was a guest lecturer at Yale University, Harvard University and Brown University. Hernández was a presenter at the National Institute of Environmental Health Sciences’ 2020 virtual series on COVID-19, climate, environment and health.

Hernández previously worked as a project director for the Clean Energy State Alliance (CESA).

=== Honors and awards ===
In 2022, Hernández was awarded the Carnegie Corporation of New York's Great Immigrant Award.

== Personal life ==
Hernández lives in Rhode Island with her husband and son.

== Filmography ==
=== Television ===
Year	Title	Role	Notes	Ref(s)
2016	Years of Living Dangerously	Self	Season 2, episode 2	

== See also ==
- Emily Cunningham
- Julia Butterfly Hill
- Abigail Borah
