= Emily Cunningham =

American user experience designer

- Occupation: User experience designer
- Known for: Environmental activism
- Notable work: Amazon Employees For Climate Justice

Emily Cunningham is an American user experience designer and environmentalist. She is known for co-founding Amazon Employees For Climate Justice and for being illegally terminated by her former employer, Amazon.

== Early life and education ==
Cunningham was born in Tucson, Arizona and grew up in various cities around Arizona between Tucson, Phoenix, and Globe. She moved to Seattle, Washington in 1998.

Cunningham has a Bachelor of Arts in sociology and a Master of Science in information management.

== Activism at Amazon ==
Cunningham joined Amazon as a user experience designer in 2013.

In late 2018, Cunningham led an employee-shareholder proposal asking Amazon to develop a climate change initiative. In January 2019, Cunningham, along with Maren Costa and others from the group calling themselves Amazon Employees For Climate Justice, met with Amazon leadership to discuss the proposal, and in February, the company announced a carbon offset plan and asked for the employees to withdraw the proposal. At the annual shareholder meeting the following May 2019, Cunningham delivered a speech to the chief executive officer of the company, Jeff Bezos, asking him to commit to the proposed resolution. The proposal was not approved.

Cunningham was terminated in April 2020 and filed an unlawful termination charge with the National Labor Relations Board (NLRB). The NLRB determined that Cunningham's termination was unlawful. Amazon denied any wrongdoing, but reached a settlement with Cunningham and the NLRB. Amazon was required to pay back wages and post notices in offices and warehouses informing employees that the company is not allowed to discharge employees for organizing.

== See also ==
- Abigail Borah
- Nicole Hernandez Hammer
- Julia Butterfly Hill
