= White House Gender Policy Council =

Department in the White House Office

Agency overview
- Formed: January 20, 2021
- Dissolved: January 20, 2025
- Agency executive: Jennifer Klein, Director
- Parent department: White House Office

White House Gender Policy Council was a department within the White House Office for the advancement of gender equity and equality in both domestic and foreign policy development and implementation. It was established upon the inauguration of the Biden administration and was initially co-chaired by Jennifer Klein and Julissa Reynoso Pantaleón.

== Formation ==
The council was a successor body to the White House Council on Women and Girls (2009-2017), which was established under the Obama administration but dissolved under the Trump administration, as well as the earlier White House Office for Women's Initiatives and Outreach (1995-2001), established under the Clinton administration but dissolved under the George W. Bush administration.

In Executive Order 14020, President Joe Biden said:

The Council shall work across executive departments and agencies (agencies) to advance gender equity and equality and provide a coordinated Federal response on issues that have a distinct impact on gender equity and equality. The Council shall also work with each agency to ensure that agency operations are conducted in a manner that promotes gender equity and equality, to the extent permitted by law.

== Accomplishments ==
The council was tasked with the creation and implementation of the Biden administration's National Strategy on Gender Equity and Equality. It advocated for lower childcare payments and better paid leave for families, and enforcing federal guidance that require hospitals to treat miscarriage patients in emergency rooms (regardless of an individual state's abortion laws).

The council launched a $100 million Initiative on Women's Health Research. After Roe v. Wade was overturned, revoking the constitutional right to abortion, the council worked to promote contraception access. It also worked to expand preventative measures for sexual assault, and safety and support measures for survivors.

The office helped draft another Biden executive order that established an independent review commission on military sexual assault, which led to decision-making about military sexual assault cases to shift from unit commanders to specialized independent military prosecutors.

The office also organized the inaugural "Girls Leading Change" awards, which were held at the White House on October 11, 2023 on the International Day of the Girl Child.

== Dissolution ==
On his first day of his second term in office, President Donald Trump signed Executive Order 14168, in which he stated:

Efforts to eradicate the biological reality of sex fundamentally attack women by depriving them of their dignity, safety, and well-being. The erasure of sex in language and policy has a corrosive impact not just on women but on the validity of the entire American system. Basing Federal policy on truth is critical to scientific inquiry, public safety, morale, and trust in government itself.

The order rescinded the Biden-era Executive Order 14020, among others.

== Personnel ==
- Lauren Supina (1995-2001, as Director of the White House Office for Women's Initiatives and Outreach)
- Valerie Jarrett (2009-2017, as Director of the White House Council on Women and Girls)
- Julissa Reynoso Pantaleón (2021-2022, as Director of the White House Gender Policy Council)
- Jennifer Klein (2022-2025)

== See also ==
- White House Council on Women and Girls
