= Criminal Justice Policy Review =

- Discipline: Criminal justice
- Language: English
- Edited by: David L. Myers

Publication details
- History: 1986-present
- Publisher: SAGE Publications
- Frequency: Quarterly
- Impact factor: (2010)

Standard abbreviations
- ISO 4: Crim. Justice Policy Rev.

Indexing
- ISSN: 0887-4034 (print); 1552-3586 (web)
- LCCN: 87654278
- OCLC no.: 48009067

Links
- Journal homepage; Online access; Online archive

Criminal Justice Policy Review is a quarterly peer-reviewed academic journal that covers the field of criminal justice. The editor-in-chief is David L. Myers (Indiana University of Pennsylvania). It was established in 1986 and is currently published by SAGE Publications.

== Abstracting and indexing ==
Criminal Justice Policy Review is abstracted and indexed in:

- Academic Search Premier
- Academic Search Elite
- Criminal Justice Abstracts
- Family Index Database
- NISC
- Sociological Abstracts
