= White House Task Force to Protect Students from Sexual Assault =

U.S. federal task force to reduce sexual assault on U.S. colleges

Council overview
- Formed: January 22, 2014
- Jurisdiction: United States
- Headquarters: White House
- Employees: 9+
- Council executives: Joe Biden, Co-chair; Valerie Jarrett, Co-chair
- Parent Council: Office of the Vice President of the United States and White House Council on Women and Girls

The White House Task Force to Protect Students from Sexual Assault was formed on January 22, 2014, after President Barack Obama directed the Office of the Vice President of the United States and the White House Council on Women and Girls to "strengthen and address compliance issues and provide institutions with additional tools to respond to and address rape and sexual assault". The Task Force is part of a wider federal move to bring awareness to sexual violence on American campuses, which also included the Office for Civil Rights release of a list of American higher education institutions with open Title IX sexual violence investigations and the It's On Us public awareness campaign. The co-chairs of the Task Force are Vice President Joe Biden and Senior Advisor to the President Valerie Jarrett.

== Background and history ==
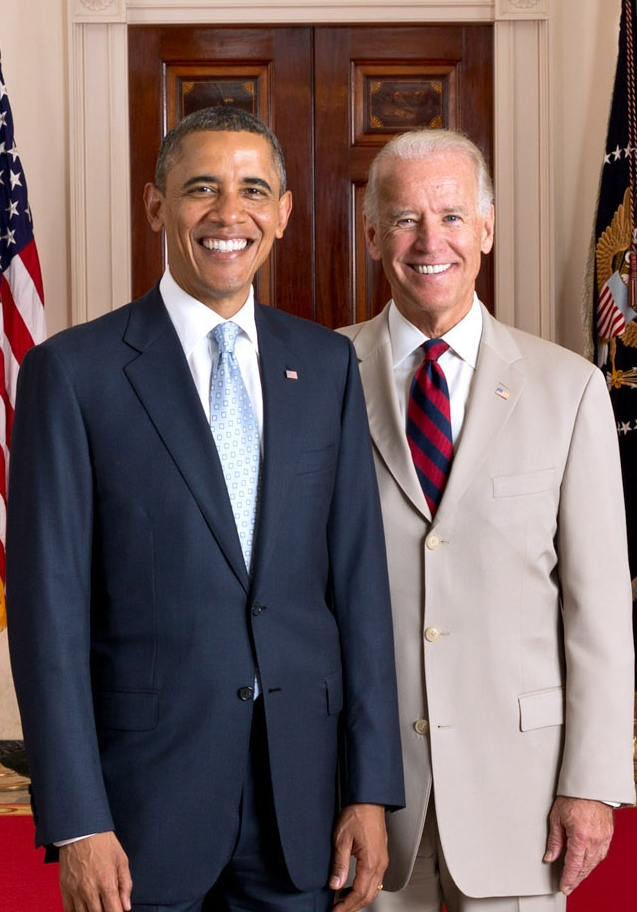
Biden with President Barack Obama, July 2012

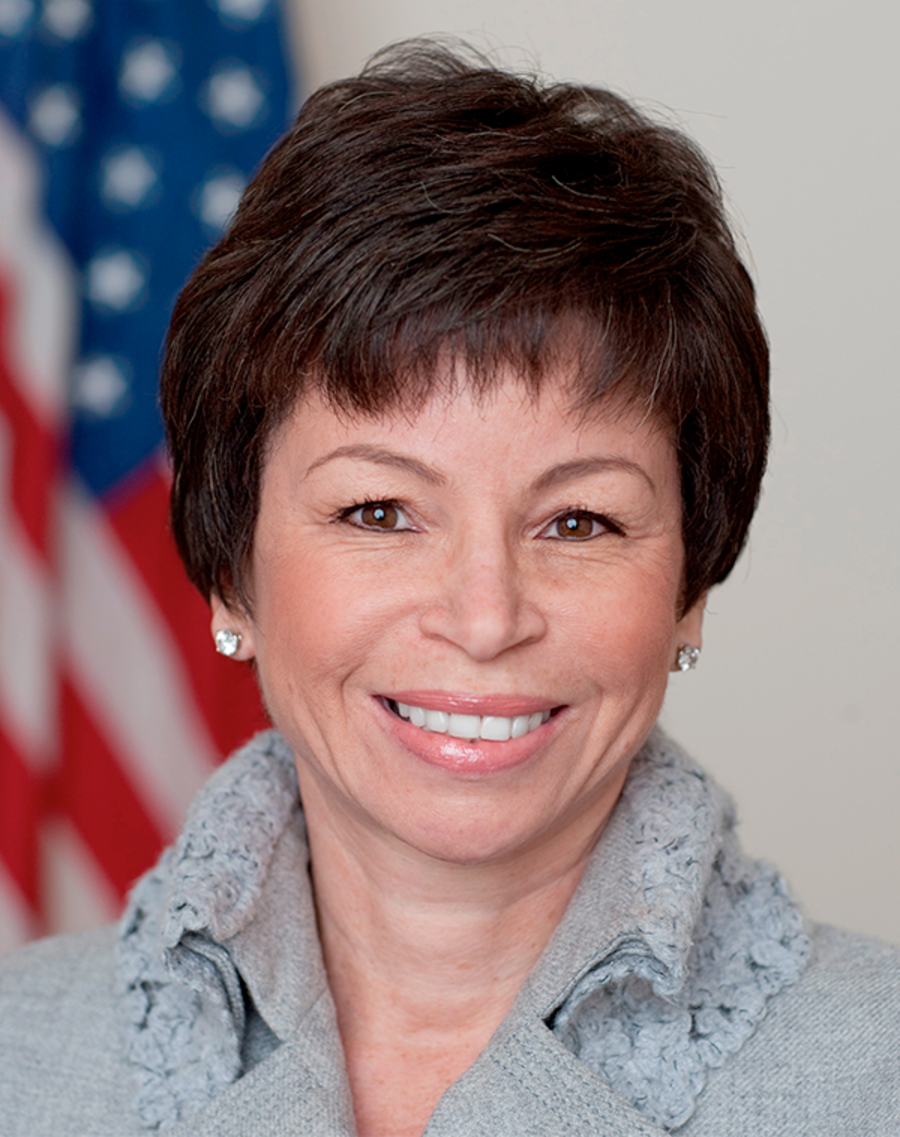
Valerie Jarrett official portrait

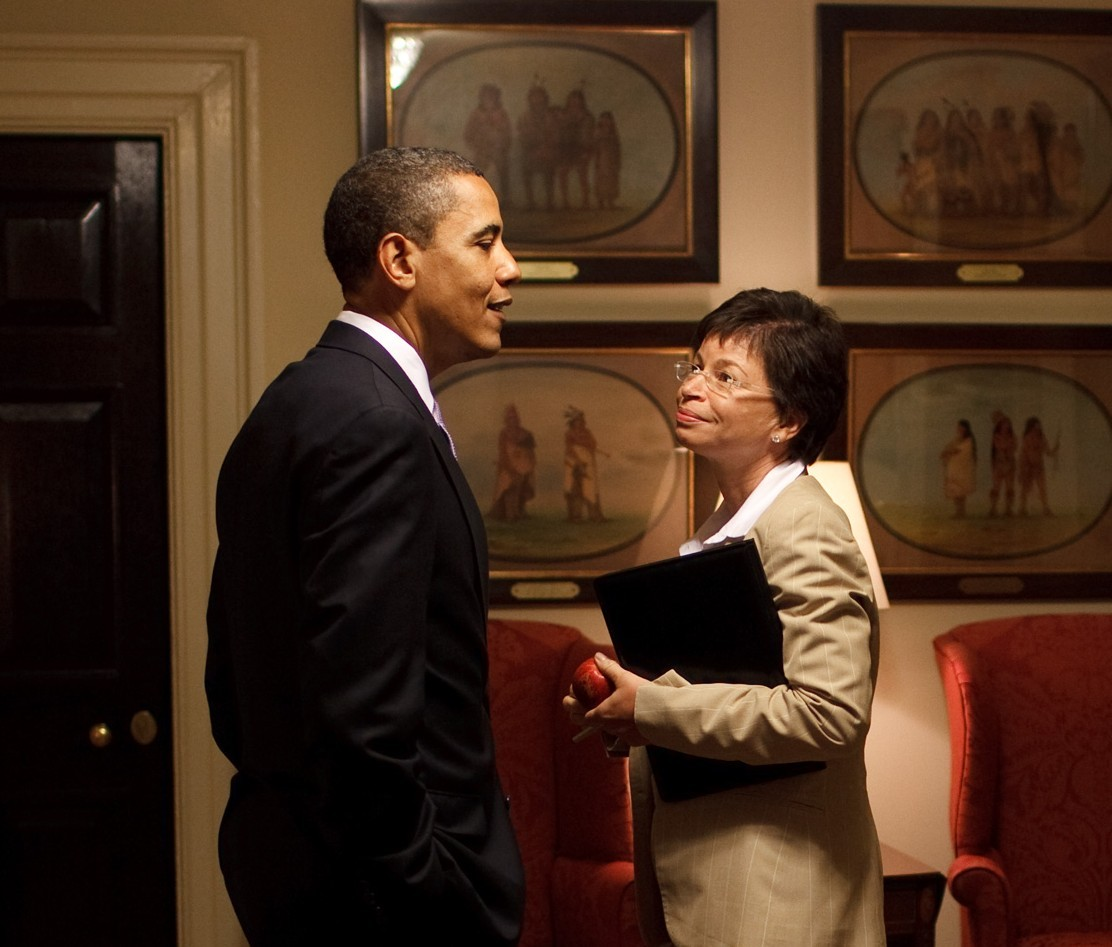
Obama speaks with Jarrett in a West Wing corridor.

While formed through an official government memorandum on January 22, 2014, the White House Task Force to Protect Students from Sexual Assault exists as part of a lineage of government interventions against sexual violence, notably the White House Council on Women and Girls formed in 2009 and the Violence Against Women Act first drafted by Biden when he was a senator in 1994. Simultaneously, activists within The New Campus Anti-Rape Movement have pushed for legislative changes in the ways the U.S. government enforces regulations, as demonstrated in the collaborations between nationally recognized activists and U.S. senators.

Since the end of the Obama presidency, the Task Force has not issued any reports and has not been revived since under the Biden administration. The website NotAlone.gov, launched as part of the Task Force initiation, has since become unavailable.

== Responsibilities ==
The Task Force was created to protect students from sexual assault, to help improve the safety of American college and university campuses, and to help American colleges and universities to "meet their obligations" and be in compliance with federal regulations in this area.

By 2016, the Task Force, in collaboration with federal agencies, produced training, messaging and guidance materials "concerning sexual assault in educational spaces," which can be found in a public-facing Resource Guide. Reporting in 2017 indicated an increase in investigations.

== Members ==
Obama specified in his official memorandum those people who are to be members of the Task Force. Those individuals include Joe Biden or his designee; Valerie Jarrett or her designee; the Attorney General; the Secretary of the Interior; the Secretary of Health and Human Services; the Secretary of Education; the Director of the Office of Science and Technology Policy; the Director of the Domestic Policy Council; the Cabinet Secretary; and agency or office heads as may be designated by the co-chairs.

== See also ==
- Post-assault treatment of sexual assault victims
- Women's rights in 2014
