= Jennifer Klein (public official) =

Member of the Gender Policy Council (2021–2025)

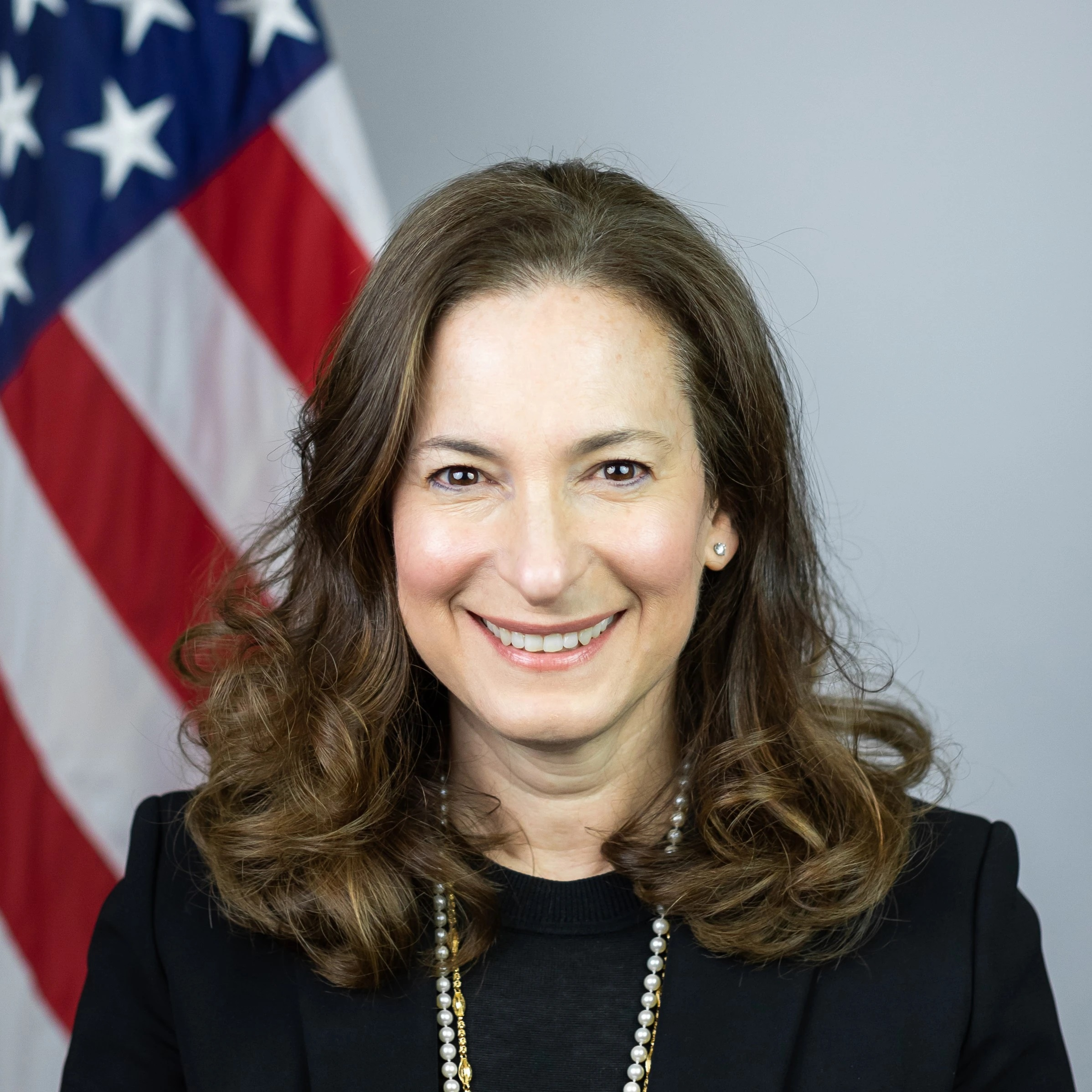

Director of the White House Gender Policy Council
- In office March 8, 2021 – January 20, 2025
- President: Joe Biden
- Preceded by: Position established
- Succeeded by: Position abolished

Personal details
- Born: June 26, 1965 (age 60)
- Party: Democratic
- Spouse: Todd Stern
- Education: Brown University (BA); Columbia University (JD)

Jennifer Lynn Klein (born June 26, 1965) served as Director of the Gender Policy Council and Assistant to the President in the Biden-Harris Administration until 2025. Director Klein was politically appointed to the role on the Gender Policy Council in 2021. President Trump dissolved the council with immediate effect on January 20, 2025. She is well known for her work that has focused on protecting women's rights and advancing gender equality in the United States and around the world. Prior to her role in the Biden-Harris Administration, Klein served in the Clinton and Obama Administrations, taught courses on gender policy issues at Georgetown University and Brown University, and served as Chief Strategy and Policy Officer at TIME'S UP.

== Education ==
Klein obtained a B.A. from Brown University in 1987 and a J.D. from Columbia University School of Law in 1990. She spent her third year of law school at Yale University Law School as a visiting student.

== Career ==
After receiving her J.D., Klein worked as an associate at Simpson Thacher & Bartlett LLP.

She then worked at the White House during the Clinton Administration, where she held a dual appointment as a Special Assistant to the President on the Domestic Policy Council and as First Lady Hillary Rodham Clinton’s senior domestic policy advisor. Her responsibilities included health care policy development and strategy, such as the State Children's Health Insurance Program and comprehensive health care reform. In addition, her work included a sweeping range of women's and children's issues such as family and medical leave, reproductive rights, adoption and child welfare, early childhood development, and child care.

Following this, Klein continued to focus on gender equality, approaching the issue from an implementation, policy, and academic perspective. She taught gender issues as an adjunct professor at Georgetown Law Center and served as a Senior Fellow at Brown University's Watson Institute.

Starting in 2009, she worked as Deputy and Senior Advisor in the State Department's Office of Global Women's Issues in the Obama Administration.

In 2015, she worked with Secretary Clinton on No Ceilings, an initiative designed to evaluate progress toward equality for women in the years after the 1995 Beijing Conference on Women.

After this, she served as a senior advisor on Women's Issues during the 2016 Hillary Clinton presidential campaign. She also served as co-chair of the Women and Families Policy Committee and a member of Women for Biden during the 2020 Joe Biden presidential campaign.

Before her appointment to the Gender Policy Council, Klein served as Chief Strategy and Policy Officer at TIME'S UP, a non-profit organization focused on survivors of gender-based violence in the workplace.

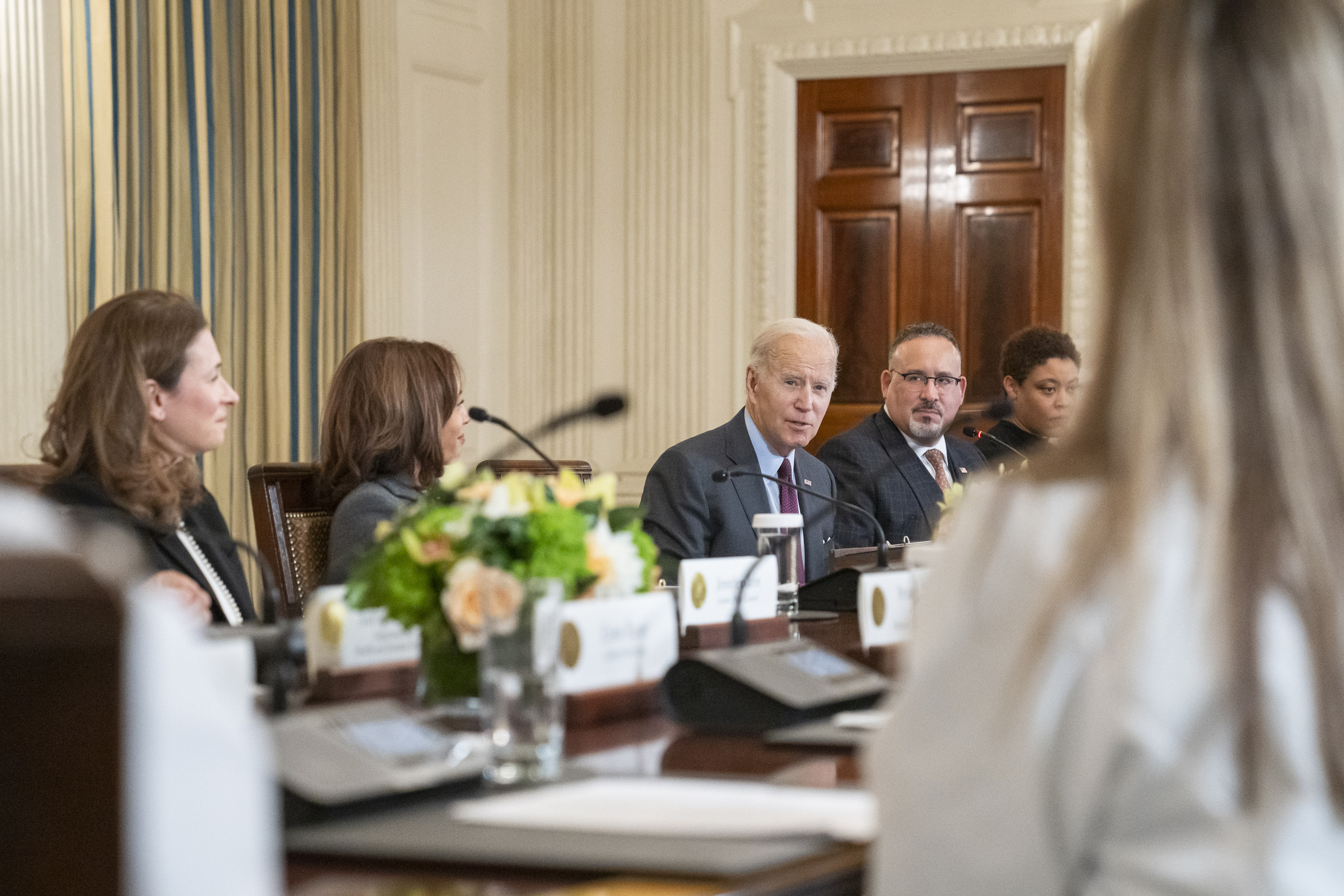
President Joe Biden and Vice President Kamala Harris visit a meeting with Klein, October 4, 2022

=== Biden-Harris Administration ===
In 2021, Klein was appointed by President Joe Biden as Director of the White House Gender Policy Council. She was then promoted to Assistant to the President in addition to her title of Director. The Gender Policy Council was designed "to guide and coordinate government policy that impacts women and girls, across a wide range of issues such as economic security, health care, racial justice, gender-based violence, and foreign policy, working in cooperation with the other White House policy councils." In this role, Klein advises President Biden on a variety of issues ranging from women's economic security, reproductive rights, and gender-based violence. The Gender Policy Council coordinates with other White House policy councils and federal agencies to advance gender equity.

Klein said that the Dobbs decision removed a fundamental constitutional right from American women and said the only way to restore the protections previously provided by Roe v. Wade is through a federal law. She said there’s a need for federal legislation to restore the rights that existed under Roe v. Wade and said there was widespread support, including among Republicans, for reproductive rights and the severe consequences women are facing due to the decision. She noted that women have been turned away from emergency rooms, forced to delay treatment, travel hundreds of miles for care, and even go to court to obtain the healthcare they need, and that doctors are leaving their home states due to laws that criminalize practicing medicine and hinder their ability to care for patients, despite their oaths to do so.

== Personal life ==
Klein currently lives in Washington, D.C. with her husband, Todd Stern, and their three children. Stern is a Senior Fellow at the Brookings Institution and former White House Special Envoy for Climate Change.
