= White House Council on Women and Girls =

US government advisory council

Council on Women and Girls
Council overview
- Formed: March 11, 2009
- Preceding Council: White House Office for Women's Initiatives and Outreach (1995–2001)
- Dissolved: 2017
- Headquarters: White House
- Employees: 10
- Council executive: Chair; Executive Director
- Parent Council: Office of Intergovernmental Affairs
- Website: The White House Council on Women and Girls

The White House Council on Women and Girls was an advisory council within the Office of Intergovernmental Affairs of the Executive Office of the President of the United States. It was established by Executive Order 13506 on March 11, 2009, with a broad mandate to advise the president on issues relating to the welfare of women and girls in order to ensure gender equality. It also ensured that other White House agencies acted in a manner to allow all things to be possible for all people. The Council was chaired by Valerie Jarrett and included the heads of every federal agency and major White House office.

The Council was not convened during the Trump administration and was disbanded in 2017. A successor body, the White House Gender Policy Council, was formed under the Biden administration on January 20, 2021.

== Formation ==
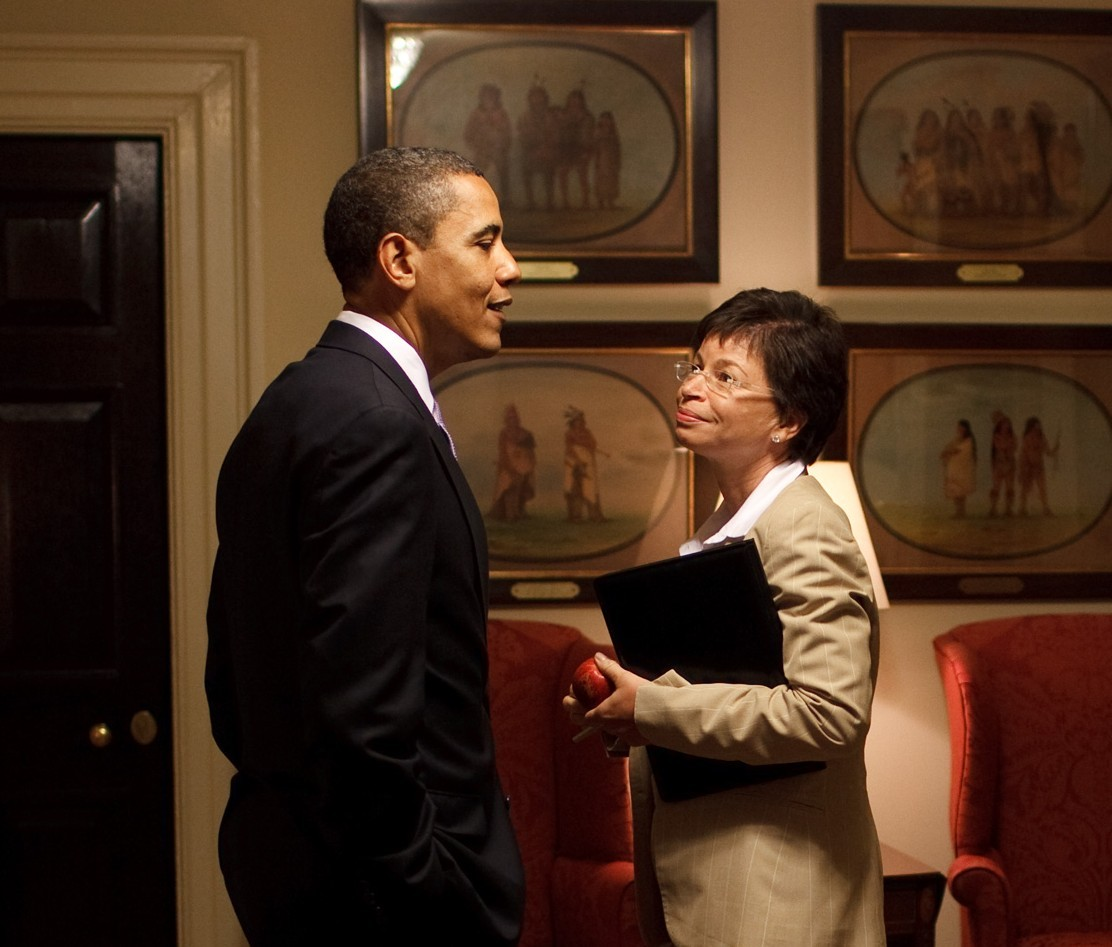
Obama speaks with Jarrett in a West Wing corridor.

President Barack Obama created the council in March 2009, effectively recreating the White House Office for Women's Initiatives and Outreach (1995–2001). This earlier office had acted as a liaison with women's groups, but had been disliked by conservatives.

In his Executive Order 13506, signed on March 11, 2009, Obama stated:

The purpose of this order is to establish a coordinated Federal response to issues that particularly impact the lives of women and girls and to ensure that Federal programs and policies address and take into account the distinctive concerns of women and girls, including women of color and those with disabilities.

The executive order lists progress in eliminating barriers to success for women, including record attendance of women at colleges and graduate schools, record numbers of female corporate executives and business owners, and a record number of women in all areas of government.

The executive order then lists areas where inequalities remained. It stated that the average American woman earns "78 cents for every dollar men make" and that women are not significantly represented in careers involving hard sciences. The executive order additionally stated that "too many women lack health insurance [... and that] violence against women and girls remains a global epidemic". It noted the challenges in guaranteeing equal opportunities in education for girls and women, and that and women had disproportionately suffered from the 2008 financial crisis.

The executive order also stated that the issues that affect women are not solely the concerns of women:

When jobs do not offer family leave, that affects men who wish to help care for their families. When women earn less than men for the same work, that affects families who have to work harder to make ends meet. When our daughters do not have the same educational and career opportunities as our sons, that affects entire communities, our economy, and our future as a Nation.

The Department of Commerce provided funding and administrative support for the Council.

== Mission ==
The Council on Women and Girls was intended to work with federal executive departments and agencies "to provide a coordinated Federal response to issues that have an impact on the lives of women and girls", including providing assistance to women-owned businesses and to help women enter professions in science, engineering and technology.

The Council was to advise the president on the effects of pending legislation and policy proposals, and to suggest changes and help develop new legislation and proposals to address issues for women and girls.

== Accomplishments ==
The White House Task Force to Protect Students from Sexual Assault was a development of both the White House Council on Women and Girls and the Office of the Vice President of the United States. The Task Force was established to protect American college and university students from sexual assault, to ensure that American colleges and universities are in compliance with federal regulations regarding sexual assault on campuses, and to help provide a safer environment for students on college and university campuses in the United States.

The Council was instrumental in providing a provision in the Affordable Care Act for women's contraception without co-pay and for general preventative healthcare and breastfeeding services, as well as with policies on education, equal pay, working families, and violence against women. It also focused on issues for women with disabilities, trans women, women of color and women of low-income communities.

On October 4–5, 2010, the Council and Fortune magazine hosted the Most Powerful Women Summit for female entrepreneurs.

On April 22, 2013, the Council and the Center for American Women and Politics at Rutgers University hosted a White House conference on girls' leadership and civic education.

On June 14, 2016, the White House Council on Women and Girls hosted the first United State of Women Summit. This conference brought attention to the successes the Obama Administration had made in promoting gender equality, as well as the issues and obstacles that women continued to face domestically and internationally. Guests at the summit included President Obama, Vice President Biden, House Democratic Leader Nancy Pelosi, and Planned Parenthood President Cecile Richards.

== Dissolution ==
After being disused for the first several months of the Trump administration, the Council was disbanded in mid-2017. Trump called the council's efforts "redundant".

== Personnel ==
=== Members ===
The following list reflects council leaders, members, and attendees as of May 2014.

Council on Women and Girls
Chair	Valerie Jarrett, senior advisor to the president and assistant to the president for intergovernmental relations and public engagement
Directors	Tina Tchen, executive director; Avra Siegel, deputy director
Regular attendees	John Kerry, Secretary of State; Jacob Lew, Secretary of the Treasury; Chuck Hagel, Secretary of Defense; Eric Holder, Attorney General; Sally Jewell, Secretary of Interior; Tom Vilsack, Secretary of Agriculture; Penny Prizker, Secretary of Commerce; Thomas Perez, Secretary of Labor; Kathleen Sebelius, Secretary of Health and Human Services; Shaun Donovan, Secretary of Housing and Urban Development; Anthony Foxx, Secretary of Transportation; Ernest Moniz, Secretary of Energy; Arne Duncan, Secretary of Education; Eric Shinseki, Secretary of Veteran Affairs; Rafael Borras, Secretary of Homeland Security; Ron Kirk, United States Trade Representative; Sylvia Mathews Burwell, Director of the Office of Management and Budget; Gina McCarthy, Administrator of the Environmental Protection Agency; Jason Furman, Chair of the Council of Economic Advisers; Katherine Archuleta, Director of the Office of Personnel Management; Karen Mills, Administrator of the Small Business Administration; Cecilia Muñoz, Director of the Domestic Policy Council; Jeffrey Zients, Director of the National Economic Council; Rajiv Shah, Administrator of the Agency for International Development; Edith Ramirez, Chair of the Federal Trade Commission; Carrie Hessler-Radelet, Director of the Peace Corps; Charles Bolden, Administrator of the National Aeronautics and Space Administration (NASA)

The executive order allowed for a member of the Council to designate a senior-level official who is a part of the member's department, agency, or office, and who is a full-time officer or employee of the federal government, to perform the Council functions of the member.

=== Support staff ===
The following individuals served in the role of support staff to the Council:

- Lynn Rosenthal, Office of the Vice President
- Jocelyn Frye, Office of the First Lady
- Meredith DeFraites, Office of National Drug Control Policy
- Rachana Bhowmik, Office of Cabinet Affairs
- John Holdren, Office of Science and Technology Policy
