= Government and politics of Seattle =

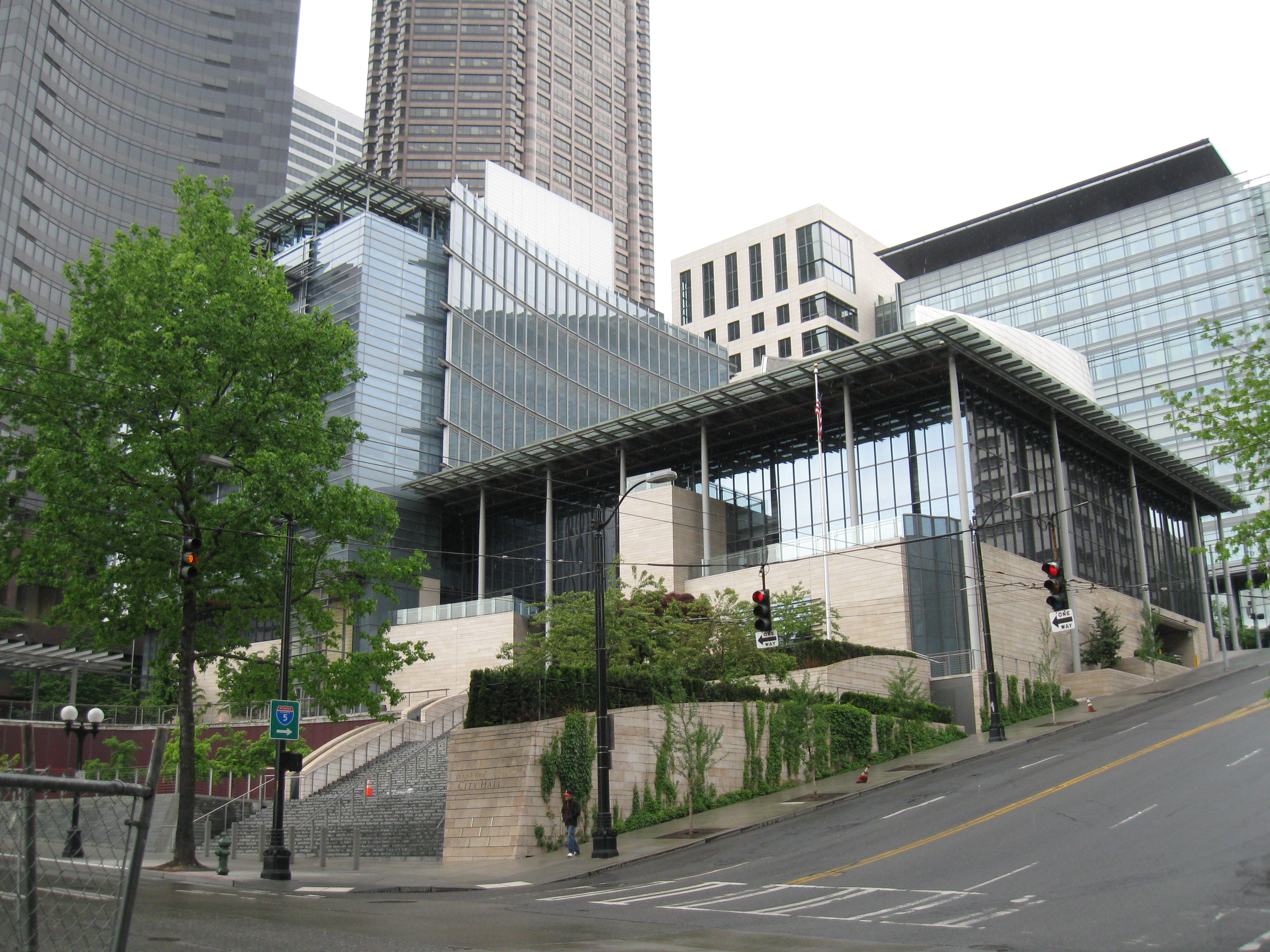
Seattle City Hall

Seattle is a charter city in the U.S. state of Washington with a mayor–council form of government. The Mayor of Seattle is head of the executive branch of city government, and the Seattle City Council, led by a Council President, is the legislative branch.

The mayor of Seattle and two of the nine members of the Seattle City Council are elected at large, rather than by geographic subdivisions. The remaining seven council positions are elected based on the city's seven council districts. The only other elected offices are the city attorney and Municipal Court judges. All offices are non-partisan. Seattle is a predominantly liberal city and tends to elect left-leaning politicians to office. Katie Wilson was elected as Mayor of Seattle in a municipal election in November 2025.

== Government ==
The city government provides more utilities than many cities; either running the whole operation, such as the water and electricity services, or handling the billing and administration, but contracting out the rest of the operations, like trash and recycling collections.

=== Organization ===
The government of the city of Seattle includes the following officers:

- Mayor
- Members of the Council
- President of the Council
- City Attorney
- Municipal Judges
- Chief of Police
- City Auditor
- City Clerk
- Fire Chief
- City Librarian
- The members of the boards or commissions of the departments and the chief administrative officer of each department and office
- The civil service
- other officers prescribed by ordinance.

== Politics ==
Presidential Elections Results
Year	Republican	Democratic	Third parties
2024	8.95% 37,281	87.00% 362,545	4.05% 16,881
2020	9.11% 39,834	88.45% 386,570	2.43% 10,625
2016	8.44% 32,362	84.22% 323,126	7.34% 28,162
2012	13.74% 48,164	83.01% 290,963	3.25% 11,385
2008	13.81% 45,761	84.32% 279,441	1.87% 6,207
2004	17.87% 57,034	80.50% 256,974	1.63% 5,195

Seattle's politics lean famously to the left compared to the U.S. as a whole. In this regard, it sits with a small set of similar U.S. cities (such as Madison, Wisconsin, Berkeley, California, and Cambridge and Boston in Massachusetts) where the dominant politics tend to range from center-left to social democratic. Seattle politics are generally dominated by the liberal wing (in the U.S. sense of the word "liberal") of the Democratic Party; in some local elections, Greens (and even, on at least one occasion, a member of the Freedom Socialist Party) have fared better than Republicans. There exists pockets of conservatism, especially in the north and in affluent neighborhoods such as Broadmoor, as well as scattered libertarians, but for the most part Seattle is primarily a Democratic city on all political levels. The city has not voted for a Republican presidential nominee since Ronald Reagan in 1984. While local elections are officially nonpartisan, most of the city's elected officials are known to be Democrats.

In 2015, Seattle voters approved the nation's first Democracy Vouchers Program, in which every city resident receives 4 $25 vouchers to donate to local candidates. The program has diversified the donor pool, allowed more candidates to run for office, and boosted political engagement among voucher users.

Democratic dominance is no less pronounced at the state and federal level. The Democrats hold majorities in both houses of the Washington State Legislature covering a significant portion of the city. At the federal level, for years Seattle was entirely within Washington's 7th congressional district, the most Democratic white-majority district in the nation. Jim McDermott, who held the district from 1989 to 2017, consistently won reelection with margins of well over 70 percent of the vote. He was succeeded by another progressive Democrat, Pramila Jayapal. After the 2010 census, part of southeast Seattle was drawn into the 9th District, represented by Democrat Adam Smith.

=== Crime and criminal justice ===
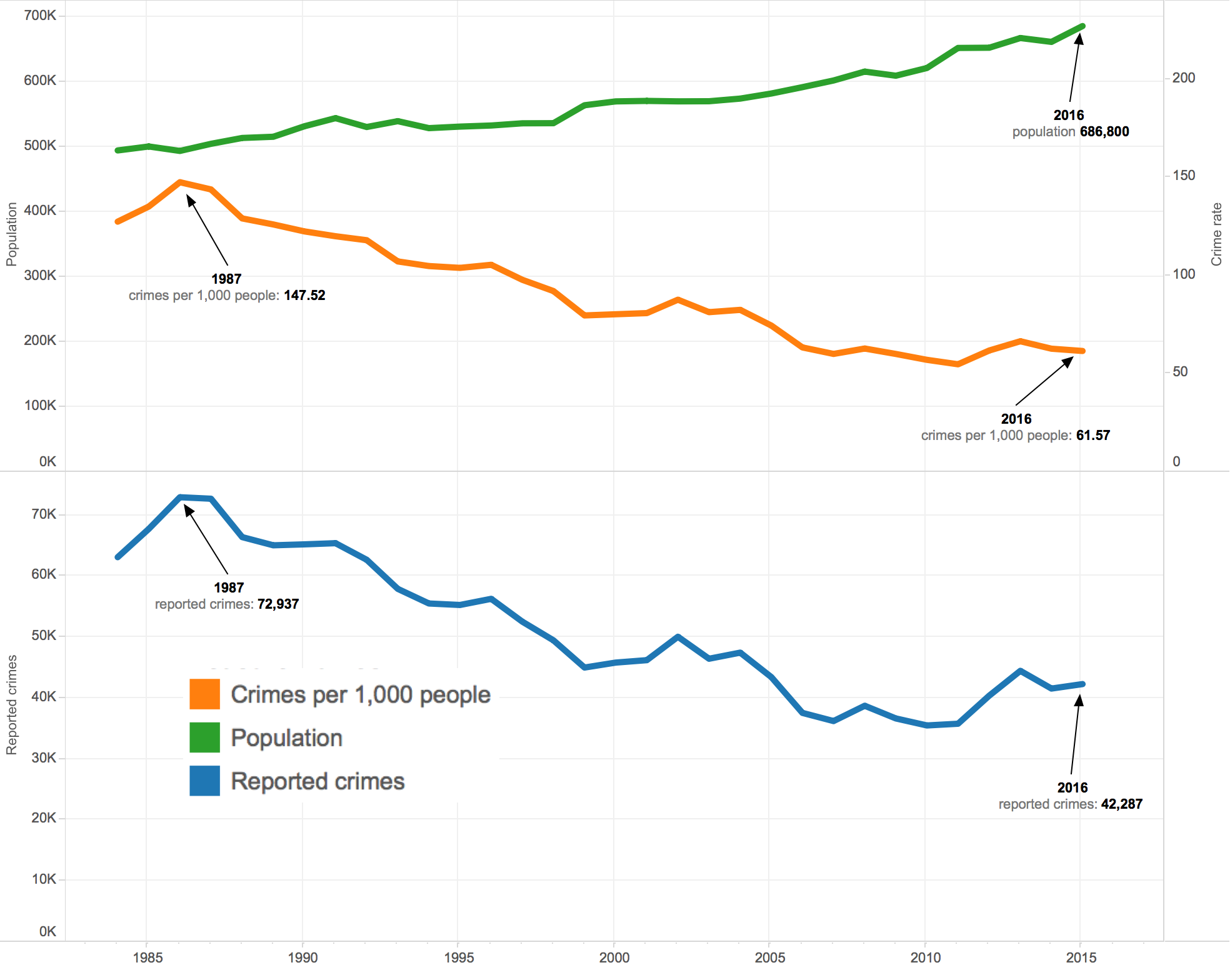
Line graph of reported crime in Seattle from 1985 through 2016. Population shown in green, total reported crimes in blue, and rate of reported crimes per 1,000 people in orange.

As with most U.S. cities, the county judicial system handles felony crimes — the Seattle Municipal Court deals with parking tickets, traffic infractions, and misdemeanors. Seattle does not have its own jail, contracting out inmates it convicts to either the King County Jail (which is located downtown), the Yakima County Jail, or (for short-term holdings) the Renton City Jail. After reaching its highest murder rate in 1994 with 69 homicides, Seattle's murder rate declined to a 40-year low with 24 homicides in 2004. By 2006, Seattle's murder rate had increased, with thirty murders that year. Auto theft is another matter: Seattle has until recently ranked in the top ten "hot spots" for auto theft; the Seattle Police Department has responded by nearly doubling the number of auto theft detail detectives, and started a "bait car" program in 2004.

Seattle has suffered two mass-murders in recent history: the 1983 Wah Mee massacre (13 people killed in the Wah Mee gambling club) and the March 25, 2006 Capitol Hill massacre when 28-year-old Kyle Aaron Huff killed six at a rave afterparty. Later in 2006, an attempted spree killing by Naveed Afzal Haq left one dead at the Jewish Federation building.

=== Official nickname, flower, slogan, and song ===
In 1981, Seattle held a contest to come up with a new official nickname to replace "the Queen City." "Queen City" had been devised by real estate promoters and used since 1869, but was also the nickname of: Cincinnati; Denver; Regina, Saskatchewan; Buffalo; Bangor, Maine; Helena, Montana; Burlington, Vermont, Charlotte, and several other cities. The winner of this contest, selected in 1982, was "the Emerald City". Submitted by Californian Sarah Sterling-Franklin, it referred to the lush, thickly forested surroundings of Seattle that were the result of frequent rain. Seattle has also been known in the past as "the Jet City"—though this nickname, related to Boeing, was entirely unofficial. It has also been known as the "Portal to the Pacific", a phrase inscribed on the arches of the tunnel leading westward into the city from the Interstate 90 floating bridge over Lake Washington.

Seattle's official flower has been the dahlia since 1913. Its official song has been "Seattle the Peerless City" since 1909. In 1942, its official slogan was "The City of Flowers"; 48 years later, in 1990, it was "The City of Goodwill", for the Goodwill Games held that year in Seattle. On October 20, 2006, the Space Needle was adorned with the new slogan "Metronatural." The slogan is a result of a 16-month, $200,000 effort by the Seattle Convention and Visitor's Bureau. The official bird of Seattle is the great blue heron, named by the City Council in 2003.

=== Seattle mayors of note ===
- Bertha Knight Landes, mayor from 1926 to 1928. She was the first woman mayor of a major American city.
- Bailey Gatzert was mayor from 1875 to 1876. He was the first Jewish mayor of Seattle, and narrowly missed being the first Jewish mayor of a major American city (Moses Bloom became mayor of Iowa City, Iowa in 1873). He has been the only Jewish mayor of Seattle to date.
- Arthur B. Langlie, 1938–1941, three term governor of Washington (1941–45, 1949–57), the only Seattle mayor to become governor.
- Robert Moran mayor from 1888 to 1909, was instrumental in the rebuilding after the 1889 fire that destroyed much of Downtown. A successful shipbuilder, most famous for the Battleship Nebraska built in Seattle between 1902 and 1907, Moran eventually donated what became Moran State Park, over 5000 acres (20 km^{2}), including Mt. Constitution on Orcas Island.

=== Sister cities ===
Seattle, Washington, has 21 sister cities through Sister Cities International.

City	Region	Country	Year
Kobe	Hyōgo Prefecture	Japan	1957
Bergen	Vestland	Norway	1967
Tashkent	Tashkent Region	Uzbekistan	1973
Beersheba	Southern District	Israel	1977
Mazatlán	Sinaloa	Mexico	1979
Nantes	Pays de la Loire	France	1980
Christchurch	Canterbury	New Zealand	1981
Mombasa	Coast Province	Kenya	1981
Chongqing	none; directly administered	People's Republic of China	1983
Limbe	Southwest Region	Cameroon	1984
Galway	County Galway	Ireland	1986
Reykjavík	N/A	Iceland	1986
Daejeon	none; directly administered	South Korea	1989
Cebu City	Cebu	Philippines	1991
Kaohsiung	none; directly administered	Taiwan	1991
Pécs	Baranya	Hungary	1991
Perugia	Umbria	Italy	1991
Surabaya	East Java	Indonesia	1992
Gdynia	Pomeranian Voivodeship	Poland	1993
Sihanoukville	Sihanoukville Province	Cambodia	1993
Haiphong	none; directly administered	Vietnam	1996

=== Sister ports ===
Port	Region	Country	Year
Port of Kobe	Hyōgo Prefecture	Japan	1957
Port of Kesennuma	Miyagi Prefecture	Japan	1990
Port of Rotterdam	South Holland	Netherlands	1959

== See also ==
- Democracy voucher, unique Seattle public-financing system for election campaigns
- City government in Washington (state)
