= Sidran =

Sidran is a surname. Notable people with the surname include:

- Abdulah Sidran (1944–2024), a Bosnian writer and poet
- Ben Sidran (born 1943), an American jazz pianist
- Leo Sidran (born 1976), an American musician, composer, performer, and producer, son of Ben Sidran
- Mark Sidran (born 1951), former Seattle City Attorney
