= 2021 Seattle City Attorney election =

- November 2, 2021
- Turnout: 54.57%
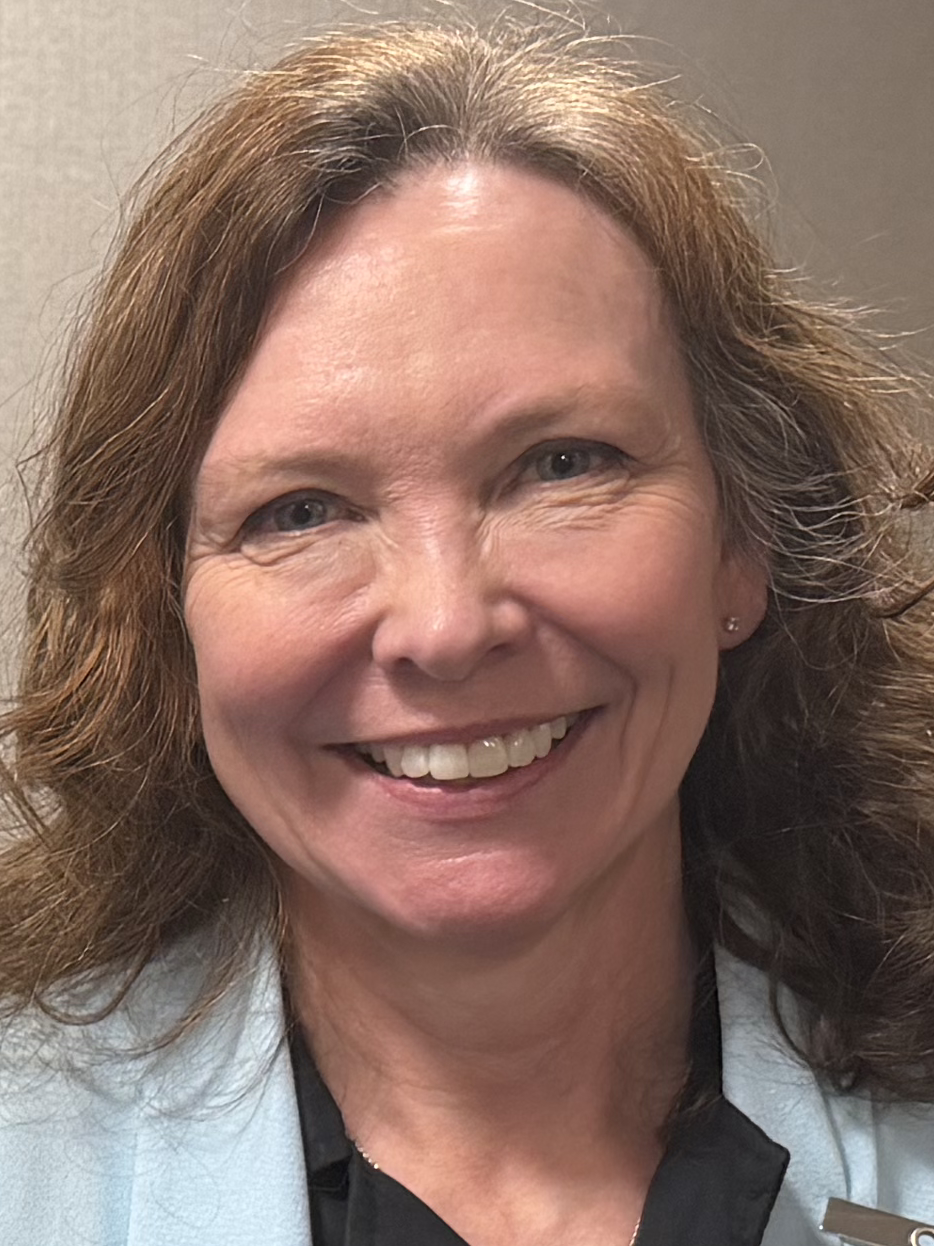

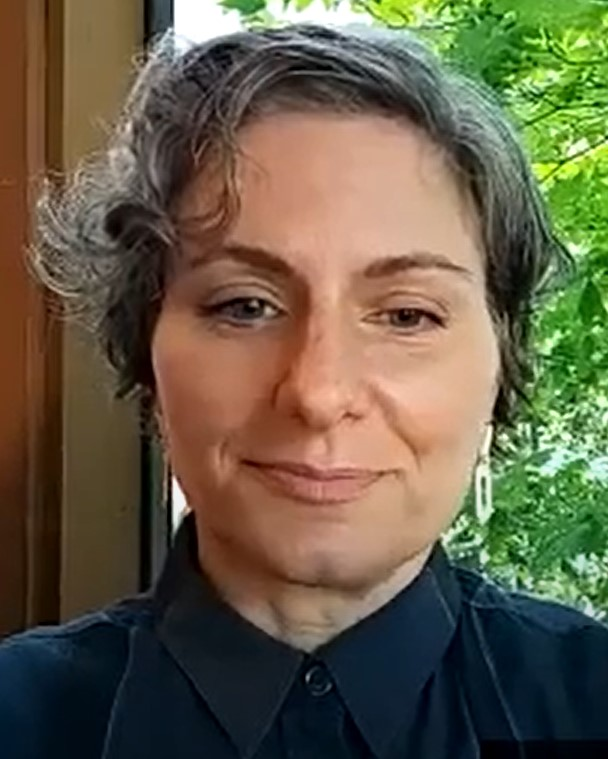
Candidate	Ann Davison	Nicole Thomas-Kennedy
Party	Nonpartisan	Nonpartisan
Popular vote	132,638	122,947
Percentage	51.49%	47.73%
- Davison: 40–50% 50–60% 60–70% 70–80% 80–90% >90% Thomas-Kennedy: 40–50% 50–60% 60–70% 70–80% 80–90% >90% Tie: 50% No data
City Attorney before election
Pete Holmes
Democratic
Elected City Attorney
Ann Davison
Republican

The 2021 Seattle city attorney election was held on November 2, 2021. Incumbent City Attorney Pete Holmes sought reelection to a fourth term in office, but came third place in the officially nonpartisan August 3 primary election and failed to advance to the general election, with both Nicole Thomas-Kennedy and Ann Davison finishing ahead of Holmes in the primary. Davison defeated Thomas-Kennedy in the general election.

== Primary election ==
=== Candidates ===
==== Declared ====
- Ann Davison (Republican), commercial lawyer, Republican candidate for lieutenant governor in 2020, and runner-up for Seattle City Council District 5 in 2019
- Pete Holmes (Democratic), incumbent Seattle city attorney (2010–present)
- Nicole Thomas-Kennedy (Democratic), police abolitionist, former public defender, and pro bono defense attorney

==== Withdrawn ====
- Steve Fortney (Democratic), former U.S. Department of Justice lawyer

=== Endorsements ===
Pete Holmes

Statewide officeholders

- Bob Ferguson, attorney general of Washington (2013–present) and former King County Councilmember (2004–2013)
- Hilary Franz, Washington Commissioner of Public Lands (2017–present)
- Mike Pellicciotti, Washington state treasurer (2021–present) and former state representative (2017–2021)

State legislators

- Liz Berry, state representative (District 36)
- David Frockt, state senator (District 46)
- Roger Goodman, state representative (District 45)
- Kirsten Harris-Talley, state representative (District 37)
- Adam Kline, former state representative (1997–2015)
- Nicole Macri, state representative (District 43)
- Jamie Pedersen, state senator (District 43)
- Gerry Pollet, state representative (District 46)
- Rebecca Saldaña, state senator (District 37)
- Javier Valdez, state representative (District 46)

Judges

- Faith Ireland, former associate justice of the Washington Supreme Court

Local officeholders

- Dow Constantine, King County executive (2009–present), former King County Councilmember (2002–2009), former state senator (2000–2002), and former state representative (1997–2000)
- Rod Dembowski, King County Councilmember (District 1)
- Jeanne Kohl-Welles, King County Councilmember (District 4)
- Dan Satterberg, King County prosecuting attorney (2007–present) (former Republican)

Seattle city councilmembers

- Lisa Herbold, Seattle City Councilmember (District 1)
- Andrew J. Lewis, Seattle City Councilmember (District 7)
- Nick Licata, former Seattle City Councilmember (1998–2016)
- Teresa Mosqueda, Seattle City Councilmember (District 8)

Organizations

- UFCW 21

Individuals

- Lisa Daugaard, executive director of the Public Defender Association and co-founder of Law Enforcement Assisted Diversion
- Rick Steves, travel writer

=== Polling ===
Poll source	Date(s) administered	Sample size (Note: Key: A – all adults RV – registered voters LV – likely voters V – unclear)	Margin of error	Ann Davison	Pete Holmes	Nicole Thomas-Kennedy	Other	Undecided
Change Research (D) (Note: Poll sponsored by the Northwest Progressive Institute)	July 12–15, 2021	617 (LV)	± 4.3%	14%	16%	14%	4% (Note: "Would not vote" with 4%)	53%

=== Results ===
Nonpartisan primary results
Candidate	Votes	%
Nicole Thomas-Kennedy	71,367	36.39%
Ann Davison	64,179	32.72%
Pete Holmes (incumbent)	60,093	30.64%
Write-in	500	0.25%
Total votes	196,139	100.0%

== General election ==
=== Debate ===
2021 Seattle city attorney debate
No.	Date	Host	Moderator	Link	Nonpartisan	Nonpartisan
Key: P Participant A Absent N Not invited I Invited W Withdrawn						
Key: P Participant A Absent N Not invited I Invited W Withdrawn					Ann Davison	Nicole Thomas-Kennedy
1	Oct. 7, 2021	Seattle Channel	Brian Callanan	YouTube	P	P

=== Endorsements ===
Ann Davison

U.S. senators

- Daniel J. Evans, former U.S. senator (1983–1989) and governor of Washington (1965–1977)

State officials

- Christine Gregoire, former governor of Washington (2005–2013) (Democrat)
- Gary Locke, former governor of Washington (1997–2005) (Democrat)

County officials

- Chris Bayley, former King County prosecuting attorney (1971–1979)

Local officials

- Richard Conlin, former Seattle City Councilmember (1998–2014) (Democrat)
- Greg Nickels, former mayor of Seattle (2002–2010) (Democrat)
- Charles Royer, former mayor of Seattle (1978–1989) (Independent)
- Mark Sidran, former Seattle city attorney (1990–2002) (Democrat)
- Wesley C. Uhlman, former mayor of Seattle (1969–1978) (Democrat)

Labor unions

- Seattle Building and Construction Trades Council

Newspapers

- The Seattle Times
Nicole Thomas-Kennedy

State legislators

- Kirsten Harris-Talley, state representative (District 37)
- Rebecca Saldaña, state senator (District 37)

Local officials

- Michael McGinn, former mayor of Seattle (2010–2013)
- Tammy Morales, Seattle City Councilmember (District 2)
- Teresa Mosqueda, Seattle City Councilmember (District 8)
- Mike O'Brien, former Seattle City Councilmember (2010–2020)
- Girmay Zahilay, King County Councilmember (District 2)

Organizations

- Fuse Washington
- Planned Parenthood Alliance Advocates
- Seattle Democratic Socialists of America
- Seattle Indivisible

Labor unions

- IUPAT DC 5
- Joint Council of Teamsters No. 28
- Martin Luther King. Jr. County Labor Council
- SEIU 775
- SEIU 925
- SEIU 1199NW
- UFCW 21

Newspapers

- The Daily of the University of Washington
- Seattle Medium
- The Stranger
- The Urbanist

=== Campaign finance ===
Candidate totals raised are as of filings on or before November 2, 2021, and totals spent reflect expenditures up to October 25, 2021. Independent expenditures are up-to-date as of filings on or before November 1, 2021.

Candidate	Campaign committee		Independent expenditure		References
Candidate	Raised	Spent	For	Against	References
Ann Davison	$439,216.26	$370,194.11	$9,930.34	$14,000.00	
Nicole Thomas-Kennedy	$428,408.98	$348,061.48	$1,176.29	$425,462.86	

=== Polling ===
Poll source	Date(s) administered	Sample size	Margin of error	Ann Davison	Nicole Thomas-Kennedy	Other	Undecided
Change Research (D)	October 12–15, 2021	617 (LV)	± 4.1%	43%	24%	2% (Note: "Would not vote" with 2%)	30%
Strategies 360 (D)	September 13–16, 2021	450 (RV)	± 4.6%	19%	16%	–	65%
Strategies 360 (D)	September 13–16, 2021	287 (LV)	± 5.8%	26%	19%	–	55%
Elway Research	September 7–9, 2021	400 (LV)	± 5.0%	26%	22%	8% (Note: "Neither One" and "No Opinion" with 4%)	45%

=== Results ===
2021 Seattle city attorney election
Candidate	Votes	%
Ann Davison	132,638	51.49%
Nicole Thomas-Kennedy	122,947	47.73%
Write-in	2,004	0.78%
Total votes	257,589	100.0%

== Notes ==
Partisan clients
