= 2025 Seattle City Attorney election =

- November 4, 2025
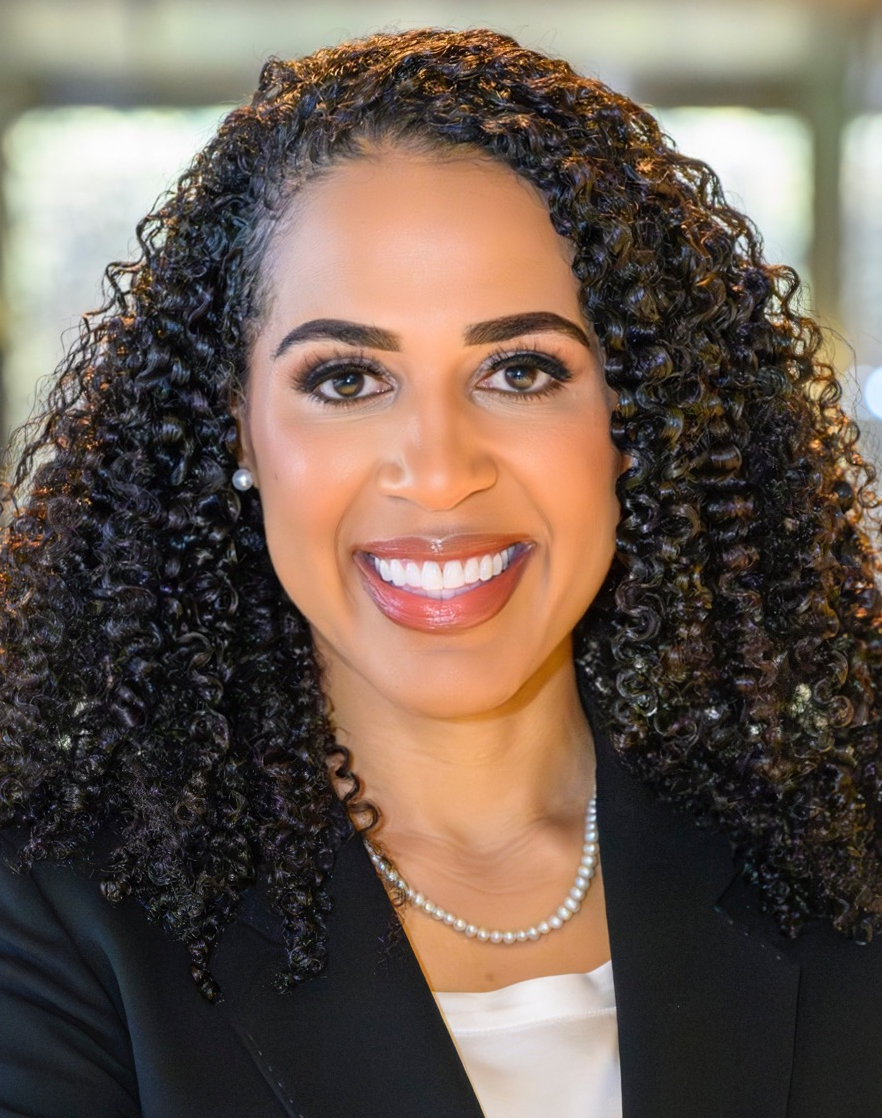

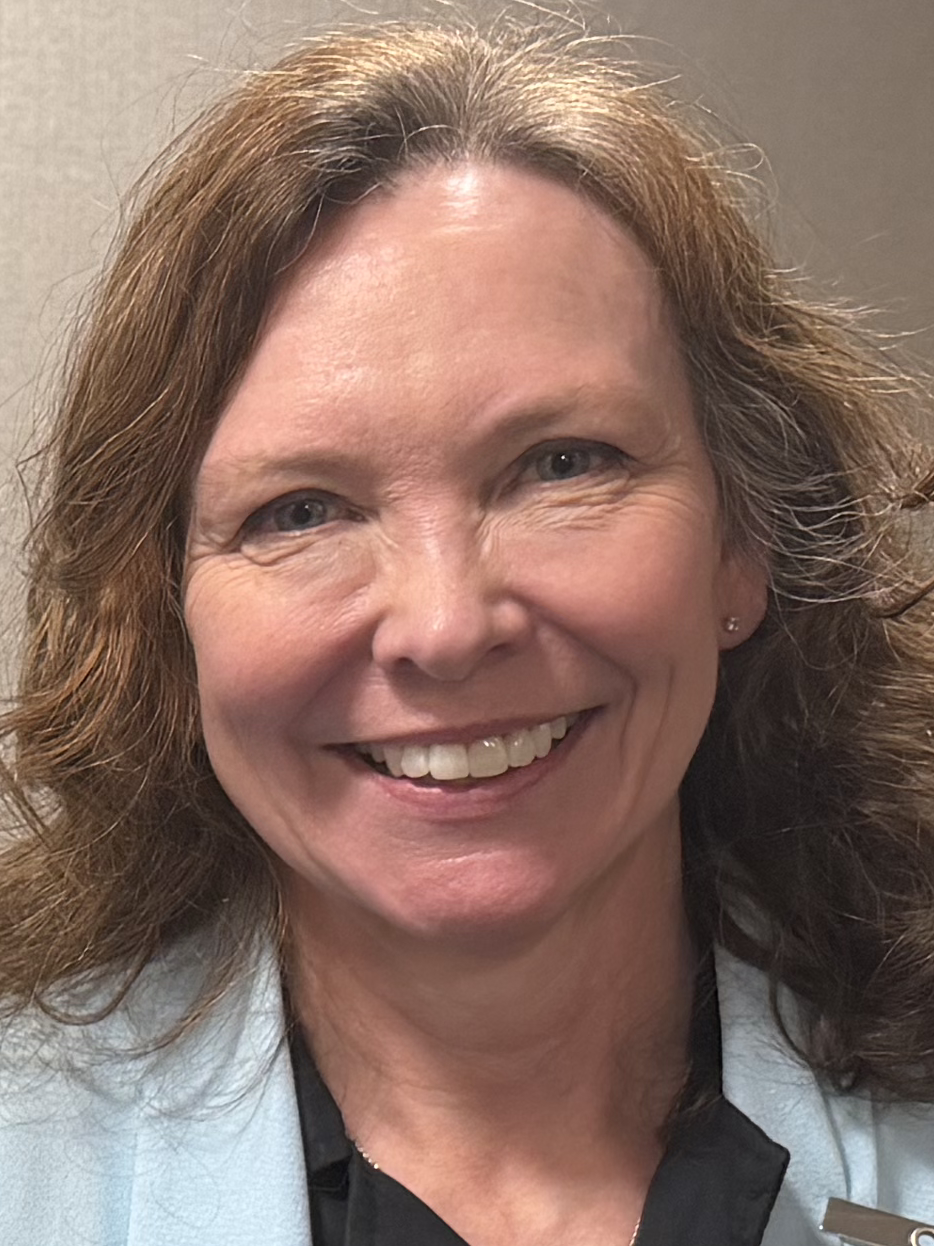
Candidate	Erika Evans	Ann Davison
Party	Nonpartisan	Nonpartisan
Popular vote	178,470	87,886
Percentage	66.90%	32.94%
- Precinct results Evans: 50–60% 60–70% 70–80% 80–90% >90% Davison: 50–60% 60–70% 70–80% 80–90%
City Attorney before election
Ann Davison
Republican
Elected City Attorney
Erika Evans
Democratic

The 2025 Seattle City Attorney elections were held on November 4, 2025. The primary election was held on August 5. Incumbent City Attorney Ann Davison was seeking re-election to a second term in office but was defeated by Erika Evans.

== Primary election ==
=== Candidates ===
==== Advanced to general ====
- Ann Davison, incumbent city attorney (Republican)
- Erika Evans, former assistant U.S. attorney (Democratic)

==== Eliminated in primary ====
- Rory O'Sullivan, housing law attorney (Democratic)
- Nathan Rouse, public defender (Democratic)

==== Declined ====
- Nicole Thomas-Kennedy, public defender and runner-up for city attorney in 2021

=== Endorsements ===
Ann Davison

Executive branch officials

- Gary Locke, former U.S. ambassador to China (2011–2014) and former governor of Washington (1997–2005)

U.S. representatives

- Adam Smith, WA-09 (1997–present)

Statewide officials

- Christine Gregoire, former governor of Washington (2005–2013)

Local officials

- Joy Hollingsworth, city councilmember from the 3rd district (2024–present) (co-endorsement with Evans)
- Robert Kettle, city councilmember from the 7th district (2024–present)
- Sara Nelson, president of the Seattle City Council (2024–present) from the 2nd district (2022–present)
- Maritza Rivera, city councilmember from the 4th district (2024–present)
- Mark Solomon, city councilmember from the 2nd district (2025–present)

Newspapers

- The Seattle Times
Erika Evans

Statewide officials

- Nick Brown, attorney general of Washington (2025–present)

Supreme court judges

- Bobbe Bridge, former Associate Justice of the Washington Supreme Court (1999–2007)

State legislators

- Rebecca Saldaña, state senator from the 37th district (2016–present) (co-endorsement with O'Sullivan)
- Shaun Scott, state representative from the 43rd district (2025–present)
- Chipalo Street, state representative from the 37th district (2023–present) (co-endorsement with O'Sullivan)

Local officials

- Joy Hollingsworth, city councilmember from the 3rd district (2024–present) (co-endorsement with Davidson)
- Teresa Mosqueda, King County Councilmember from the 8th district (2024–present)
- Alexis Mercedes Rinck, city councilmember from the 8th district (2024–present)
- Girmay Zahilay, King County Councilmember from the 2nd district (2020–present)

Labor unions

- King County Labor Council
- Service Employees International Union 775
- United Auto Workers Local 4121
- United Food and Commercial Workers Local 3000

Organizations

- National Women's Political Caucus of Washington

Newspapers

- The Daily of the University of Washington
- The Stranger
Rory O'Sullivan

Statewide officials

- Patty Kuderer, insurance commissioner of Washington (2025–present)

State legislators

- Rebecca Saldaña, state senator from the 37th district (2016–present) (co-endorsement with Evans)
- Sharon Tomiko Santos, state representative from the 37th district (1999–present)
- Chipalo Street, state representative from the 37th district (2023–present) (co-endorsement with Evans)

Local officials

- Lisa Herbold, former city councilmember from the 1st district (2016–2024)
- Tammy Morales, former city councilmember from the 2nd district (2020–2025)
- Mike O'Brien, former city councilmember from the 6th district (2010–2020)

Labor unions

- American Federation of Teachers Washington
Nathan Rouse

State legislators

- Maralyn Chase, former state senator from the 32nd district (2011–2019)
- Darya Farivar, state representative from the 46th district (2023–present)

=== Polling ===
Poll source	Date(s) administered	Sample size (Note: Key: A – all adults RV – registered voters LV – likely voters V – unclear)	Margin of error	Ann Davison	Erika Evans	Rory O'Sullivan	Nathan Rouse	Other	Undecided
Change Research (D) (Note: Poll sponsored by the Northwest Progressive Institute)	July 23–25, 2025	651 (LV)	± 4.1%	31%	18%	5%	2%	3% (Note: "Would not vote" with 3%)	41%

Hypothetical polling

Ann Davison vs. generic Democratic candidate

Poll source	Date(s) administered	Sample size	Margin of error	Ann Davison	Generic Democratic candidate	Undecided
Change Research (D)	January 31 – February 5, 2025	684 (LV)	± 4.3%	32%	46%	22%

=== Results ===
2025 Seattle City Attorney primary election
Candidate	Votes	%
Erika Evans	106,254	55.83%
Ann Davison (incumbent)	63,587	33.41%
Rory O'Sullivan	10,973	5.77%
Nathan Rouse	9,073	4.77%
Write-in	417	0.22%
Total votes	190,304	100.00%

== General election ==
=== Polling ===
Poll source	Date(s) administered	Sample size	Margin of error	Ann Davison	Erika Evans	Other	Undecided
Change Research (D)	October 19–23, 2025	615 (LV)	± 4.0%	26%	45%	–	29%
Change Research (D)	October 19–23, 2025	615 (LV)	± 4.0%	28% (Note: With voters who lean towards a given candidate)	49%	4% (Note: "Would not vote" with 4%)	19%
DHM Research (Note: Poll sponsored by The Stranger)	October 6–13, 2025	400 (LV)	± 4.0%	27%	38%	–	35%

=== Results ===
General election turnout map by precinct 0–10% 10–20% 20–30% 30–40% 40–50% 50–60% 60–70% 70–80%

2025 Seattle City Attorney general election
Candidate	Votes	%
Erika Evans	178,470	66.90%
Ann Davison (incumbent)	87,886	32.94%
Write-in	422	0.16%
Total votes	266,778	100.00%

== See also ==
- 2025 Seattle mayoral election
- 2025 Seattle City Council election

== Notes ==
Partisan clients
