= 2004 Washington Attorney General election =

- November 2, 2004
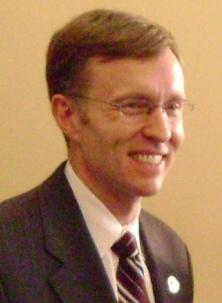

Nominee	Rob McKenna	Deborah Senn
Party	Republican	Democratic
Popular vote	1,425,368	1,163,964
Percentage	52.98%	43.27%
- McKenna: 40–50% 50–60% 60–70% Senn: 40–50% 50–60%
Attorney General before election
Christine Gregoire
Democratic
Elected Attorney General
Rob McKenna
Republican

The 2004 Washington Attorney General election was held on Tuesday, November 2, 2004, to elect the attorney general of Washington, concurrently with the 2004 U.S. presidential election, as well as elections to the U.S. Senate and various state and local elections, including for U.S. House and governor of Washington.

Incumbent Democratic Attorney General Christine Gregoire retired to run for governor. Republican King County Councilor Rob McKenna defeated Democratic former state Insurance Commissioner Deborah Senn to succeed Gregoire. Primary elections took place on September 14.

== Democratic primary ==
=== Candidates ===
==== Nominee ====
- Deborah Senn, former insurance commissioner of Washington (1993–2001) and candidate for U.S. Senate in 2000

==== Eliminated in primary ====
- Mark Sidran, former Seattle City Attorney (1990–2002) and candidate for Mayor of Seattle in 2001

==== Declined ====
- Christine Gregoire, incumbent attorney general (1993–2005) (ran for governor)

=== Endorsements ===
Mark Sidran

Statewide officials

- Gary Locke, governor of Washington (1997–2005)

=== Polling ===
Poll source	Date(s) administered	Sample size (Note: Key: A – all adults RV – registered voters LV – likely voters V – unclear)	Margin of error	Deborah Senn	Mark Sidran	Undecided
SurveyUSA	September 10–12, 2004	471 (LV)	± 4.6%	47%	47%	6%

=== Results ===
Results by county Senn: 50–60%; 60–70%; 70–80%; Sidran: 50–60%

Democratic primary results
Party	Candidate	Votes	%
Democratic	Deborah Senn	365,922	50.68%
Democratic	Mark Sidran	356,125	49.32%
Total votes		722,047	100.00%

==== By county ====
County results
County	Deborah Senn		Mark Sidran		Margin		Total votes
County	#	%	#	%	#	%	Total votes
Adams	395	60.03%	263	39.97%	132	20.06%	658
Asotin	913	61.23%	578	38.77%	335	22.47%	1,491
Benton	5,463	65.51%	2,876	34.49%	2,587	31.02%	8,339
Chelan	2,887	56.77%	2,198	43.23%	689	13.55%	5,085
Clallam	4,768	52.17%	4,372	47.83%	396	4.33%	9,140
Clark	18,277	67.88%	8,647	32.12%	9,630	35.77%	26,924
Columbia	194	64.67%	106	35.33%	88	29.33%	300
Cowlitz	6,129	63.47%	3,528	36.53%	2,601	26.93%	9,657
Douglas	1,250	59.02%	868	40.98%	382	18.04%	2,118
Ferry	404	70.02%	173	29.98%	231	40.03%	577
Franklin	1,474	63.84%	835	36.16%	639	27.67%	2,309
Garfield	103	60.23%	68	39.77%	35	20.47%	171
Grant	2,354	60.64%	1,528	39.36%	826	21.28%	3,882
Grays Harbor	4,169	46.32%	4,831	53.68%	-662	-7.36%	9,000
Island	5,208	52.28%	4,754	47.72%	454	4.56%	9,962
Jefferson	3,333	52.09%	3,065	47.91%	268	4.19%	6,398
King	125,591	45.24%	152,001	54.76%	-26,410	-9.51%	277,592
Kitsap	16,989	47.90%	18,481	52.10%	-1,492	-4.21%	35,470
Kittitas	1,813	61.52%	1,134	38.48%	679	23.04%	2,947
Klickitat	855	67.06%	420	32.94%	435	34.12%	1,275
Lewis	2,833	51.64%	2,653	48.36%	180	3.28%	5,486
Lincoln	553	65.91%	286	34.09%	267	31.82%	839
Mason	3,349	52.94%	2,977	47.06%	372	5.88%	6,326
Okanogan	1,853	65.25%	987	34.75%	866	30.49%	2,840
Pacific	1,618	55.00%	1,324	45.00%	294	9.99%	2,942
Pend Oreille	910	68.84%	412	31.16%	498	37.67%	1,322
Pierce	39,690	49.73%	40,113	50.27%	-423	-0.53%	79,803
San Juan	1,868	57.14%	1,401	42.86%	467	14.29%	3,269
Skagit	6,830	50.28%	6,755	49.72%	75	0.55%	13,585
Skamania	643	66.36%	326	33.64%	317	32.71%	969
Snohomish	35,206	46.97%	39,751	53.03%	-4,545	-6.06%	74,957
Spokane	29,492	65.22%	15,726	34.78%	13,766	30.44%	45,218
Stevens	1,967	66.10%	1,009	33.90%	958	32.19%	2,976
Thurston	12,562	42.90%	16,718	57.10%	-4,156	-14.19%	29,280
Wahkiakum	340	63.67%	194	36.33%	146	27.34%	534
Walla Walla	2,304	65.83%	1,196	34.17%	1,108	31.66%	3,500
Whatcom	11,922	57.70%	8,740	42.30%	3,182	15.40%	20,662
Whitman	1,560	62.00%	956	38.00%	604	24.01%	2,516
Yakima	7,853	66.96%	3,875	33.04%	3,978	33.92%	11,728
Totals	365,922	50.68%	356,125	49.32%	9,797	1.36%	722,047

== Republican primary ==
=== Candidates ===
==== Nominee ====
- Rob McKenna, King County Councilor (1996–2005)

==== Eliminated in primary ====
- Mike Vaska, attorney

=== Endorsements ===
Mike Vaska

Statewide officials

- Daniel J. Evans, former governor of Washington (1965–1977)
- Doug Sutherland, public lands commissioner of Washington (2001–2009)

Individuals

- John W. Stanton, CEO of Western Wireless Corporation

=== Results ===
Results by county McKenna: 70–80%; 80–90%; 90–100%

Republican primary results
Party	Candidate	Votes	%
Republican	Rob McKenna	366,906	77.61%
Republican	Mike Vaska	105,848	22.39%
Total votes		472,754	100.00%

==== By county ====
County results
County	Rob McKenna		Mike Vaska		Margin		Total votes
County	#	%	#	%	#	%	Total votes
Adams	1,278	72.49%	485	27.51%	793	44.98%	1,763
Asotin	1,345	85.83%	222	14.17%	1,123	71.67%	1,567
Benton	12,838	82.40%	2,742	17.60%	10,096	64.80%	15,580
Chelan	5,111	83.79%	989	16.21%	4,122	67.57%	6,100
Clallam	5,684	79.45%	1,470	20.55%	4,214	58.90%	7,154
Clark	16,199	71.20%	6,551	28.80%	9,648	42.41%	22,750
Columbia	615	90.18%	67	9.82%	548	80.35%	682
Cowlitz	3,633	76.78%	1,099	23.22%	2,534	53.55%	4,732
Douglas	2,944	82.23%	636	17.77%	2,308	64.47%	3,580
Ferry	753	75.60%	243	24.40%	510	51.20%	996
Franklin	3,229	84.55%	590	15.45%	2,639	69.10%	3,819
Garfield	333	80.43%	81	19.57%	252	60.87%	414
Grant	5,676	83.84%	1,094	16.16%	4,582	67.68%	6,770
Grays Harbor	2,436	78.78%	656	21.22%	1,780	57.57%	3,092
Island	5,751	74.23%	1,997	25.77%	3,754	48.45%	7,748
Jefferson	2,250	75.99%	711	24.01%	1,539	51.98%	2,961
King	92,676	78.43%	25,488	21.57%	67,188	56.86%	118,164
Kitsap	16,019	75.87%	5,094	24.13%	10,925	51.75%	21,113
Kittitas	3,438	85.42%	587	14.58%	2,851	70.83%	4,025
Klickitat	1,146	83.65%	224	16.35%	922	67.30%	1,370
Lewis	5,653	79.51%	1,457	20.49%	4,196	59.02%	7,110
Lincoln	1,558	83.27%	313	16.73%	1,245	66.54%	1,871
Mason	3,095	76.34%	959	24.66%	2,136	52.69%	4,054
Okanogan	3,285	80.34%	804	19.66%	2,481	60.67%	4,089
Pacific	1,031	80.74%	246	19.26%	785	61.47%	1,277
Pend Oreille	1,402	80.02%	350	19.98%	1,052	60.05%	1,752
Pierce	38,037	74.70%	12,885	25.30%	25,152	49.39%	50,922
San Juan	1,250	82.29%	269	17.71%	981	64.58%	1,519
Skagit	7,567	78.80%	2,036	21.20%	5,531	57.60%	9,603
Skamania	659	70.78%	272	29.22%	387	41.57%	931
Snohomish	33,492	75.35%	10,957	24.65%	22,535	50.70%	44,449
Spokane	35,843	75.71%	11,497	24.29%	24,346	51.43%	47,340
Stevens	4,161	82.38%	890	17.62%	3,271	64.76%	5,051
Thurston	11,982	76.14%	3,755	23.86%	8,227	52.28%	15,737
Wahkiakum	194	72.66%	73	27.34%	121	45.32%	267
Walla Walla	5,059	83.13%	1,027	16.87%	4,032	66.25%	6,086
Whatcom	12,374	87.09%	1,835	12.91%	10,539	74.17%	14,209
Whitman	3,353	86.06%	543	13.94%	2,810	72.13%	3,896
Yakima	13,557	74.44%	4,654	25.56%	8,903	48.89%	18,211
Totals	366,906	77.61%	105,848	22.39%	261,058	55.22%	472,754

== Libertarian primary ==
=== Candidates ===
==== Nominee ====
- J. Bradley Gibson, attorney

=== Results ===
Libertarian primary results
Party	Candidate	Votes	%
Libertarian	J. Bradley Gibson	12,710	100.00%
Total votes		12,710	100.00%

== General election ==
=== Post-primary endorsements ===
Rob McKenna (R)

Newspapers

- The Seattle Times

=== Polling ===
Poll source	Date(s) administered	Sample size	Margin of error	Deborah Senn (D)	Rob McKenna (R)	Other / Undecided
SurveyUSA	October 29–31, 2004	617 (LV)	± 4.0%	43%	49%	8%

=== Results ===
2004 Washington Attorney General election
Party	Candidate	Votes	%	±%
Republican	Rob McKenna	1,425,368	52.98%	+14.75%
Democratic	Deborah Senn	1,163,964	43.27%	–12.71%
Libertarian	J. Bradley Gibson	56,792	2.11%	–1.83%
Green	Paul Richmond	44,020	1.64%	N/A
Total votes		2,690,144	100.00%	N/A
Republican gain from Democratic				

==== By county ====
County	Deborah Senn Democratic		Rob McKenna Republican		Various candidates Other parties		Margin		Total
County	#	%	#	%	#	%	#	%	Total
Adams	1,322	27.59%	3,340	69.71%	129	2.69%	2,018	42.12%	4,791
Asotin	3,124	38.37%	4,716	57.93%	301	3.70%	1,592	19.56%	8,141
Benton	17,716	28.49%	42,465	68.28%	2,011	3.23%	24,749	39.79%	62,192
Chelan	8,759	31.52%	18,176	65.41%	852	3.07%	9,417	33.89%	27,787
Clallam	13,938	41.34%	18,321	54.34%	1,459	4.33%	4,383	13.00%	33,718
Clark	64,613	41.53%	85,111	54.70%	5,874	3.78%	20,498	13.17%	155,598
Columbia	572	29.24%	1,331	68.05%	53	2.71%	759	38.80%	1,956
Cowlitz	19,097	48.18%	19,138	48.28%	1,405	3.54%	41	0.10%	39,640
Douglas	3,850	30.22%	8,547	67.09%	342	2.68%	4,697	36.87%	12,739
Ferry	1,114	36.19%	1,810	58.80%	154	5.00%	696	22.61%	3,078
Franklin	4,828	31.05%	10,266	66.02%	455	2.93%	5,438	34.97%	15,549
Garfield	348	28.95%	821	68.30%	33	2.75%	473	39.35%	1,202
Grant	7,252	29.46%	16,575	67.33%	789	3.21%	9,323	37.87%	24,616
Grays Harbor	11,897	44.93%	13,566	51.24%	1,014	3.83%	1,669	6.30%	26,477
Island	14,425	40.28%	20,228	56.48%	1,159	3.24%	5,803	16.20%	35,812
Jefferson	9,438	53.17%	7,503	42.27%	808	4.55%	-1,935	-10.90%	17,749
King	421,843	50.39%	383,397	45.80%	31,953	3.82%	-38,446	-4.59%	837,193
Kitsap	48,133	42.55%	60,644	53.61%	4,347	3.84%	12,511	11.06%	113,124
Kittitas	5,372	35.48%	9,213	60.85%	556	3.67%	3,841	25.37%	15,141
Klickitat	3,506	41.63%	4,540	53.91%	375	4.45%	1,034	12.28%	8,421
Lewis	9,209	30.20%	20,124	65.99%	1,161	3.81%	10,915	35.79%	30,494
Lincoln	1,507	27.71%	3,758	69.09%	174	3.20%	2,251	41.39%	5,439
Mason	9,770	41.08%	12,909	54.29%	1,101	4.63%	3,139	13.20%	23,780
Okanogan	5,399	36.03%	8,877	59.24%	710	4.74%	3,478	23.21%	14,986
Pacific	4,711	49.28%	4,411	46.14%	438	4.58%	-300	-3.14%	9,560
Pend Oreille	2,199	37.58%	3,382	57.80%	270	4.61%	1,183	20.22%	5,851
Pierce	126,703	42.42%	161,770	54.16%	10,233	3.43%	35,067	11.74%	298,706
San Juan	5,054	53.42%	3,776	39.92%	630	6.66%	-1,278	-13.51%	9,460
Skagit	20,310	40.89%	27,594	55.55%	1,767	3.56%	7,284	14.66%	49,671
Skamania	2,068	43.76%	2,363	50.00%	295	6.24%	295	6.24%	4,726
Snohomish	118,422	42.18%	152,846	54.44%	9,480	3.38%	34,424	12.26%	280,748
Spokane	73,132	38.08%	113,682	59.19%	6,254	3.26%	40,550	21.11%	193,068
Stevens	5,973	31.28%	12,280	64.30%	845	4.42%	6,307	33.02%	19,098
Thurston	43,051	40.44%	58,156	54.63%	5,254	4.94%	15,105	14.19%	106,461
Wahkiakum	850	42.78%	1,035	52.09%	102	5.13%	185	9.31%	1,987
Walla Walla	7,092	33.09%	13,665	63.76%	676	3.15%	6,573	30.67%	21,433
Whatcom	36,899	44.51%	42,061	50.74%	3,935	4.75%	5,162	6.23%	82,895
Whitman	6,612	39.83%	9,284	55.93%	704	4.24%	2,672	16.10%	16,600
Yakima	23,856	33.96%	43,687	62.18%	2,714	3.86%	19,831	28.23%	70,257
Totals	1,163,964	43.27%	1,425,368	52.98%	100,812	3.75%	261,404	9.72%	2,690,144

Counties that flipped from Democratic to Republican

- Benton (largest city: Kennewick)
- Clallam (largest city: Port Angeles)
- Clark (largest city: Vancouver)
- Cowlitz (largest city: Longview)
- Franklin (largest city: Pasco)
- Grays Harbor (largest city: Abderdeen)
- Island (largest city: Oak Harbor)
- Kitsap (largest city: Bremerton)
- Kittitas (largest city: Ellensburg)
- Mason (largest city: Shelton)
- Pend Oreille (largest city: Newport)
- Pierce (largest city: Tacoma)
- Skagit (largest city: Mount Vernon)
- Skamania (largest city: Carson)
- Snohomish (largest city: Everett)
- Spokane (largest city: Spokane)
- Thurston (largest city: Lacey)
- Wahkiakum (largest city: Puget Island)
- Whatcom (largest city: Bellingham)
- Whitman (largest city: Pullman)
- Yakima (largest city: Yakima)
