= Daugaard =

Daugaard is a Danish surname. Notable people with the surname include:

- Dennis Daugaard (born 1953), American politician
- Kim Daugaard (born 1974), Danish football player and manager
- Katrine Daugaard (born 1981), Danish politician
- Line Daugaard (born 1978), Danish handball player
- Lisa Daugaard (born 1965/1966), American criminal reform activist
- Rasmus Daugaard (born 1976), Danish footballer
