= Erika Evans =

American lawyer and politician

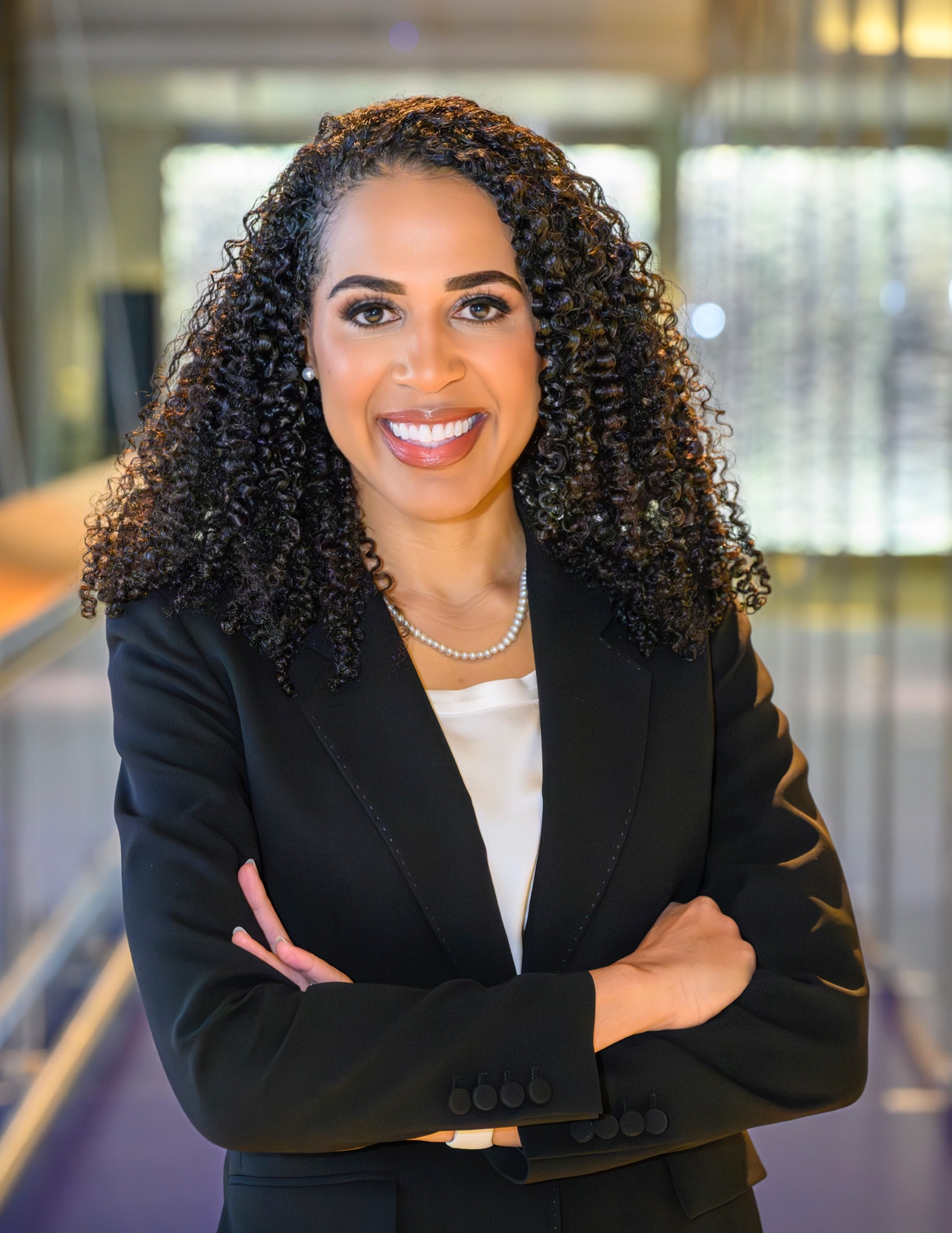
- Evans in 2026

City Attorney of Seattle
- Incumbent
- Assumed office January 7, 2026
- Preceded by: Ann Davison

Personal details
- Born: 1989 or 1990 (age 36–37)
- Party: Democratic
- Education: University of Washington, Tacoma (BA); Seattle University (JD)

Erika Evans (born 1989 or 1990) is an American lawyer and politician serving as the Seattle City Attorney since 2026. In the November 2025 election, she defeated incumbent Republican Ann Davison with 66.8 percent of the vote. Evans is the first Black person elected to the office.

Evans previously served as an assistant U.S. Attorney, where she was the office's Civil Rights Coordinator. She resigned from the U.S. Department of Justice in March 2025, citing the department's direction under the second Trump administration, including the rollback of diversity initiatives and new policies on birthright citizenship. She ran for City Attorney on a platform that included implementing a restorative justice model, increasing the prosecution of wage theft, and opposing the administration's policies.

== Early life and education ==
Evans grew up in Tacoma, Washington, in a Black, working-class, and low-income household that was steeped in civil rights activism. She has stated that her family has deep roots in civil rights activism. Her grandfather was Lee Evans, a track and field athlete who won a gold medal in the 400-meter race at the 1968 Olympics. At the Games, he protested racial inequality by wearing a Black Panther-style beret and raising his fist during the medal presentation, while her grandmother planned human rights demonstrations at the games. Evans has recounted that her grandfather was guided by his own childhood experiences with injustice.

Evans attended the University of Washington Tacoma for her undergraduate degree and later completed a J.D. from Seattle University School of Law. Before attending law school, she volunteered at legal aid clinics assisting people who could not afford an attorney.

== Career ==
=== Early legal career ===
Evans began her legal career at the Seattle City Attorney's Office under then-City Attorney Pete Holmes, working in both the criminal and civil divisions. As a line-level trial prosecutor, she handled misdemeanor cases, including DUI and assault, before being promoted to the civil side, where she defended the City of Seattle in lawsuits.

During this time, Evans served as a judge pro tempore, presiding over cases in the city-level courts of Seatac, Puyallup, and Tukwila.

She was president of the Loren Miller Bar Association, a civil rights group for the Black legal community. For seven years, Evans led the association's Bar Studies Program, which assists diverse law graduates in passing the bar exam. She co-chaired the Charles V. Johnson youth in law forum and was selected as co-chair of the Washington Leadership Institute, which helps attorneys from underserved backgrounds advance into leadership roles.

=== U.S. Attorney's Office ===
In 2021, Evans became an assistant U.S. Attorney for the Western District of Washington, working under Nicholas W. Brown. Evans worked in the violent crimes and terrorism unit, and her most recent role was as the office's Civil Rights Coordinator, where she was responsible for prosecuting hate crimes and holding police officers accountable for excessive use of force.

Evans resigned from the U.S. Department of Justice (DOJ) in March 2025, soon after U.S. president Donald Trump returned to the White House. Her stated reasons for leaving included the DOJ's new direction, such as rolling back diversity initiatives and defending the administration's Executive Order 14160 to end birthright citizenship. Evans also cited new directives, stating, "We were getting notices to report on colleagues doing diversity work in the office," and being told that U.S. attorney general Pam Bondi's interpretation of the law was binding on all DOJ lawyers.

== Seattle City Attorney ==
=== 2025 election ===
In March 2025, Evans entered 2025 Seattle City Attorney election, challenging the incumbent, Ann Davison, to become the first Black person to hold the office. Her campaign platform included three main priorities, public safety, a restorative justice model, and fight "federal overreach" from the Trump administration. Evans' platform also included creating a new unit to prosecute hate crimes and housing discrimination, as well as hiring more attorneys to increase the prosecution of wage theft and protect labor and tenant rights.

In the August primary, Evans finished first with 55.8% of the vote, while Davison received 33.4%, allowing both to advance to the general election. Other primary candidates included legal aid attorney Rory O'Sullivan and public defender Nathan Rouse.

Evans was a vocal critic of Davison's "tough on crime" policies, calling them "ineffective." She criticized Davison's High Utilizers Initiative, which targeted repeat offenders, arguing that jailing individuals with behavioral health issues without resources creates a regressive cycle of imprisonment. Evans called Davison's "Stay Out of Drug Area" (SODA) and "Stay Out of Area of Prostitution" (SOAP) zones a "failed policy" and "racist." Davison defended the exclusionary zones, stating that she has heard from community members that they are working.

Evans criticized the Davison administration for the "doubled" filing times in domestic violence cases, stating that she would prioritize domestic violence and DUIs cases. She also would reinstate the community court program that Davison ended, and strengthen it to help provide better access to fundamental services across the board.

Evans' campaign received endorsements from Washington attorney general Nick Brown, U.S. representative Pramila Jayapal, former Seattle City Attorney Pete Holmes, and the King County Democrats. Davison received endorsements from the majority of the Seattle City Council, and former governors Christine Gregoire and Gary Locke.

In the November general election, Evans won the election, securing 66.8% (177,699 votes) to Davison's 32.9% (87,480 votes).

=== Tenure ===
Evans was sworn in on 7 January 2026 by federal judge Richard A. Jones. Her swearing-in ceremony was also attended by Seattle Police Chief Shon Barnes and Washington Attorney General Nick Brown.

In October 2026, a federal judge ordered the Department of Justice to provisionally reinstate Erika Evans—a judicial appointee who had been dismissed by President Donald Trump—amid a broader dispute regarding the president's authority to appoint individuals of his choosing to key prosecutorial positions.

== Personal life ==
In 2017, Evans' apartment building in Eastlake, Seattle was shot up by police officers. As of 2024, she is a resident of Seattle and her partner is Christopher Sanders.
