= Pooja Vaddadi =

American lawyer

Judge of the Seattle Municipal Court
- Incumbent
- Assumed office January 2023
- Preceded by: Adam Eisenberg

Personal details
- Education: Bryn Mawr College (BA); Seattle University (JD); University of California, Berkeley (MLL)

Pooja Vaddadi is an American lawyer who has served as a judge in the Seattle Municipal Court since January 2023. She was a public defender before she was elected judge.

== Biography ==
Before her judge election, Vaddadi was a private defense attorney and worked as a public defender for the King County Department of Public Defense. She was an adjunct professor at Seattle University.

Vaddadi earned her Bachelor's degree in political science from Bryn Mawr College, her Juris Doctor from Seattle University, and her Master of Laws from University of California, Berkeley.

== Seattle Municipal Court ==
=== Election ===
Vaddadi ran for a position on the Seattle Municipal Court in 2022 against incumbent Adam Eisenberg. She ran as a progressive, highlighting her role as a public defender, and said she would focus on restorative justice. Vaddadi said almost all the "miscarriages of justice" at the court were caused by judicial error and that she would be competent and impartial to "rehabilitate the reputation of the court." She also said that she would run her courtroom that is not biased in favor of the prosecution.

Vaddadi published a statement stating 15 individuals came to her alleging sex-based discrimination and professional misconduct by Eisenberg, which he denied. Vaddadi also said he focused on providing harsh punishments, especially in domestic violence cases.

In the November general election, Vaddadi defeated Eisenberg, 62% to 38%.

=== Tenure ===
In February 2024, Vaddadi ruled that a Seattle city prosecutor was disqualified from a specific case due to a conflict in witness statements but denied a motion disqualifying the Seattle City Attorney office from the case. In response to the ruling, the City Attorney's office sent a memo disqualifying Vaddadi from hearing new criminal cases, accusing her of bias against the prosecution and mishandling cases. Vaddadi responded to the memo stating that "all my decisions have been made within the confines of the law" and "I have to follow the court rules." She also said, "I affectionately call the municipal court a teaching court...I am supposed to rule on the law within my discretion, not based on what's prompted to me." Months after she was disqualified from hearing criminal cases, Vaddadi wrote an op-ed saying the city attorney's decision was the "most extreme version of such a policy that I'm aware of anywhere in Washington."

After the City Attorney disqualified Vaddadi, the Municipal Court reassigned her to traffic cases, which magistrates primarily hear. Vaddadi said, "I really just want to help the best way that I can here. I would love to sit in my own courtroom to do the criminal cases that I've been elected to do."

In October 2024, the American Civil Liberties Union filed a lawsuit against the City Attorney's Office, alleging that the memo disqualifying Vaddadi removed a sitting judge off the bench. In the letter, the ACLU stated that Davison disqualifying Vaddadi "is undermining the democratic will of Seattle voters." In February 2025, the lawsuit was dismissed by the King County Superior Court, as the "ability to remove a judge from specific cases is available as a matter of right to each party", although the Superior Court judge noted "This isn’t a decision on the merits of what this city attorney was doing with respect to this judge". At a court hearing the same day, however, a member of the city prosecutor's office indicated they were no longer seeking to remove Vaddadi from all criminal cases.
