= 2001 Seattle mayoral election =

- November 6, 2001
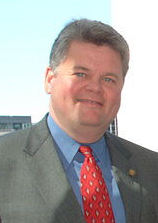

Nominee	Greg Nickels	Mark Sidran
Party	Nonpartisan	Nonpartisan
Popular vote	86,403	83,245
Percentage	50.15%	48.32%
Mayor before election
Paul Schell
Nonpartisan
Elected Mayor
Greg Nickels
Nonpartisan

The 2001 Seattle mayoral election took place on November 6, 2001, to select the Mayor of Seattle, Washington. Incumbent Mayor Paul Schell ran for re-election to a second term. Schell faced criticism over his handling of the Mardi Gras riot, the relocation of Boeing's headquarters out of the city, and the 1999 WTO protests.

In the primary election, Sidran and Nickels placed first and second by a wide margin, with Sidran receiving 34 percent of the vote and Nickels receiving 33 percent. Schell placed a distant third with 22 percent of the vote, becoming the first incumbent Mayor since 1956 to lose re-election.

The general election was close, and though Nickels narrowly led Sidran on election night, the race was too close to call. Nickels ultimately defeated Sidran, winning 50 percent of the vote to Sidran's 48 percent, in what was the closest mayoral election since 1912.

== Primary election ==
=== Candidates ===
- Mark Sidran, City Attorney
- Greg Nickels, County Councilman, 1997 candidate for Mayor
- Paul Schell, incumbent Mayor
- Charlie Chong, former City Councilman, 1997 candidate for Mayor
- Scott Kennedy, businessman
- Bob Hegamin, retired engineer
- Omari Tahir-Garrett, community activist
- Caleb Schaber, artist
- Scott K. Whittemore
- Richard Lee, conspiracy theorist
- Piero Bugoni
- Max Englerius, security consultant

=== Results ===
Primary election results
Candidate	Votes	%
Mark Sidran	39,506	33.80%
Greg Nickels	39,098	33.46%
Paul Schell (inc.)	25,392	21.73%
Charlie Chong	8,162	6.98%
Scott Kennedy	2,279	1.95%
Bob Hegamin	502	0.43%
Omari Tahir-Garrett	487	0.42%
Caleb Schaber	479	0.41%
Scott K. Whittemore	353	0.30%
Richard Lee	281	0.24%
Piero Bugoni	219	0.19%
Max Englerius	107	0.09%
Write-in	297	0.25%
Total votes	116,865	100.00%

== General election ==
=== Results ===
2001 Seattle mayoral election
Candidate	Votes	%
Greg Nickels	86,403	50.15%
Mark Sidran	83,245	48.32%
Total votes	188,097	100.00%
