= Ann Davison (politician) =

American lawyer and politician

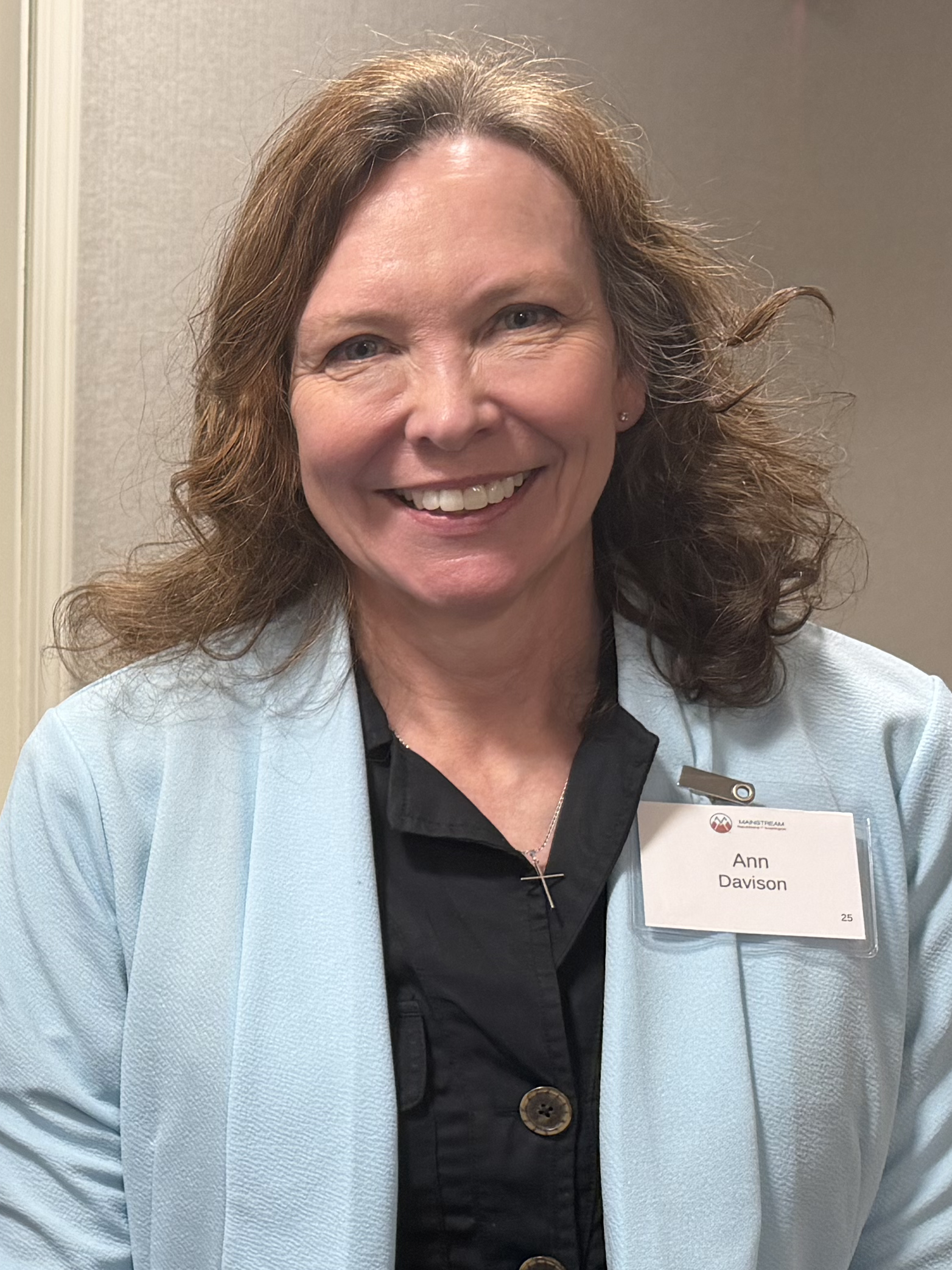
- Davison in 2026

City Attorney of Seattle
- In office January 1, 2022 – January 1, 2026
- Preceded by: Pete Holmes
- Succeeded by: Erika Evans

Personal details
- Born: Texas, U.S.
- Party: Democratic (before 2020); Republican (2020–present)
- Education: Baylor University (BA); Willamette University (JD)

Ann Davison is an American attorney who served as Seattle City Attorney from 2022 to 2026. She was elected to the nonpartisan office in 2021 as a Republican and is the first woman to hold the position. She lost her bid for re-election in 2025.

== Early life and education ==
Before moving to Seattle, Davison worked as a caseworker at the United States House of Representatives in Washington D.C. In 1996, she moved from her home state of Texas to Seattle where she worked at the front desk for the Seattle SuperSonics until 2001. She then graduated from law school and began practicing law in 2005, working as a law clerk in Salem, Oregon and in private practice. Davison also taught international business law at the University of Washington.

Davison earned a BA in sociology from Baylor University, and her Juris Doctor degree from Willamette University College of Law.

== Previous political campaigns ==
=== Seattle City Council ===
In 2019, Davison challenged Debora Juarez, an incumbent member of the Seattle City Council, with four other challengers. In the August primary, Juarez came in first, with 45.1% of the vote, and advanced to the general election with Davison, who earned 26.71%. She and Jaurez sparred on homelessness, with Juarez focusing on increasing funding and affordable housing, while Davison focused on housing up to 2,000 homeless people into abandoned warehouses while not increasing funding for homelessness services.

In the general election, Juarez defeated Davison, 60.59% to 39.05%.

=== Washington Lieutenant Governor ===
In 2020, Davison left the Democratic Party and announced her campaign for lieutenant governor of Washington, running as a Republican. She promoted her status as a former Democrat, associating with the WalkAway campaign of Democrats-turned-Republicans. In making the case for her party switch, Davison said she felt unwelcome in the Democratic Party and that the "Right has gotten more welcoming, because we’re really wanting to talk about everyone in the middle.” During her campaign, she floated the idea that the state legislature should abolish the lieutenant governor's office to save money.

Davison finished third in the August primary with 12% of the vote, finishing behind Democrats Congressman Denny Heck and state Senator Marko Liias but ahead of four other Republican candidates.

Davison later confirmed she voted for Democrat Joe Biden for president that same year.

== Seattle City Attorney ==
=== Elections ===
==== 2021 election ====
Davison ran in the 2021 Seattle City Attorney election and faced incumbent Pete Holmes and former public defender Nicole Thomas-Kennedy. Davison criticized Holmes for being too lenient on low-level crimes and allowing too many repeat offenders to cycle through the system, while Thomas-Kennedy criticized him for being too aggressive against shoplifters and other misdemeanor defendants. In the August primary, Thomas-Kennedy came in first, with 36.39%, and advanced to the general with Davison, who earned 32.72% of the vote.

In the general election Davison focused on enforcing existing laws, while Thomas-Kennedy argued for ending traditional prosecutions of misdemeanors. Davison played down her Republican party affiliation in the overwhelmingly Democratic city, and focused on Thomas-Kennedy support for the abolition of police. Thomas-Kennedy received the support of many labor unions and Democratic politicians during the campaign while Davison received support from three former governors of Washington, Democrats Christine Gregoire and Gary Locke, and Republican Dan Evans as well as The Seattle Times newspaper.

In the November general election, Davison defeated Thomas-Kennedy, 51.5% to 47.7%

==== 2025 reelection ====
In January 2025, Davison announced she would run for re-election. She drew three challengers for the August primary; former Federal and Seattle prosecutor Erika Evans, public defender Nathan Rouse, and employment lawyer Rory O'Sullivan. On July 10 she was endorsed by the Seattle Times. In the August primary, Davison came in a distant second, with 33.41% of the vote, and advanced to the general election with Evans, who came in first with 55.83%. In the November 4, 2025 general election Davison would be ousted by Evans after only winning close to 33% of the vote.

=== Tenure ===
Davison is the first female city attorney since the office was created in 1875.

When Davison took office, she stated that there was a 5,000-case backlog left over from Holmes, due to the COVID-19 pandemic. In a review of cases, Davison stated she would decline to prosecute nearly 2,000 misdemeanor cases, and would prioritize "crimes against persons." She also launched a "high utilizer initiative," which identified 118 individuals with 12 or more cases, who were responsible for over 2,400 cases from 2016 to 2021.

In May 2023, Davison announced that she would end the city's participation in Community Court, a program created to address racial disproportionality in the criminal justice system and divert individuals from criminal charges. She cited data as her reason to end participation, saying that 52% of people who participating in Community Court committed crime after participating in the program. In May 2025, Davison announced plans to create a New "Drug Prosecution Alternative," which would "provide an incentive for defendants arrested for drug use and possession to connect with services and commit no new law violations to have their drug cases dismissed." The program is similar to Community Court that she ended participation in.

In February 2024, the Seattle Prosecuting Attorney's Office Criminal Division released a memo stating that "All parties have the legal right" to file affidavits, "if the party believes that it cannot receive a fair hearing or trial." The office then filed hundreds of affidavits of prejudice to stop Judge Pooja Vaddadi, who was elected the year prior, from hearing criminal cases. Davison cited a "regular pattern of biased rulings" and stated that Vaddadi's "decisions demonstrate a complete lack of understanding, or perhaps even intentional disregard, of the evidence rules, even on basic issues." Vaddadi was reassigned to traffic and civil cases due to the block by Davison's office. The ACLU of Washington filed a lawsuit against the Seattle Prosecuting Attorney's office, which claimed that city prosecutors were misusing their discretion by effectively unseating an elected judge. In February 2025, a King County Superior Court judge dismissed the ACLU's case, and Davison's office stated they would end blocking Vaddadi from hearing cases. In April 2025, Vaddidi filed a complaint with the Washington State Bar Association against Davison and her former criminal division chief, stating their claims were "counterfactual, false, and defamatory."

In August 2024, Davison, along with Councilmembers Cathy Moore and Robert Kettle, announced legislation to create two exclusionary zones, a Stay Out of Areas of Prostitution (SOAP) and Stay Out of Drug Areas (SODA) zones. Although there was a large and fierce public opposition to the zones, the SODA and SOAP zones passed the city council 8-1.
