= Tom Carr (politician) =

American lawyer

Seattle City Attorney
- In office 2002–2009
- Preceded by: Mark Sidran
- Succeeded by: Pete Holmes

Personal details
- Education: New York Law School; St. John's University

Tom Carr was the City Attorney of Boulder, Colorado from 2010 to 2021. He managed an office of 17 people, and received a salary of $170,000 per year.

He formerly served as Seattle City Attorney from 2002 to 2009. He is remembered for founding the Community Court (giving repeat petty criminals access to treatment), and supporting an extensive undercover operation (Operation Sobering Thought) against underage drinking. He was defeated in 2009, receiving 38% of the vote to Pete Holmes' 62%.

Prior to his career in public service, Carr was a partner at Barrett Gilman & Ziker (specializing in commercial litigation), an Assistant United States Attorney in the Eastern District of New York (specializing in organized crime), and Chairman of the Elevated Transportation Company Council (planning the Seattle Center Monorail, during which time he became close friends with future-mayor Greg Nickels). He received his bachelor's degree from St. Johns University and his Juris Doctor from New York Law School. He was born in The Bronx.

Political offices
Preceded by Mark Sidran	Seattle City Attorney; 2002–2009	Succeeded by Pete Holmes
