= Metronatural =

Metronatural is a trade-marked tourism slogan created for the City of Seattle by the Seattle Convention and Visitor's Bureau. It was unveiled on October 20, 2006. According to Exclaim, the firm who developed the slogan, "metronatural is the fusion of city and nature. It is what makes Seattle unique."

The slogan's creator defined Metronatural as: "Met-ro-nat-u-ral adj. 1. Having the characteristics of a world-class metropolis, beautiful natural surroundings. 2. A blending of clear skies and expansive water with a fast-paced city life. n. 1. One who respects the environment and lives a balanced lifestyle of urban and natural experiences. 2. Seattle."

The slogan was developed at a cost of $200,000, that included the creation of the new tagline, new photography, promotional and collateral materials as well as publications aimed to leisure travelers, meeting planners, travel agents and tour operators and the media. As part of the unveiling, the slogan's logo (the word "metronatural" in black and green with "TM" symbol) was painted on the roof of the Space Needle, and Seattle Mayor Greg Nickels proclaimed October 20, 2006 to be "Metronatural Day".

Seattle's previous tourism slogan, "See-At-L", was created in 1999, and written with the image of an eye, the at (@) symbol, and letter "L".
