= Seattle Municipal Court =

City court in Washington, US

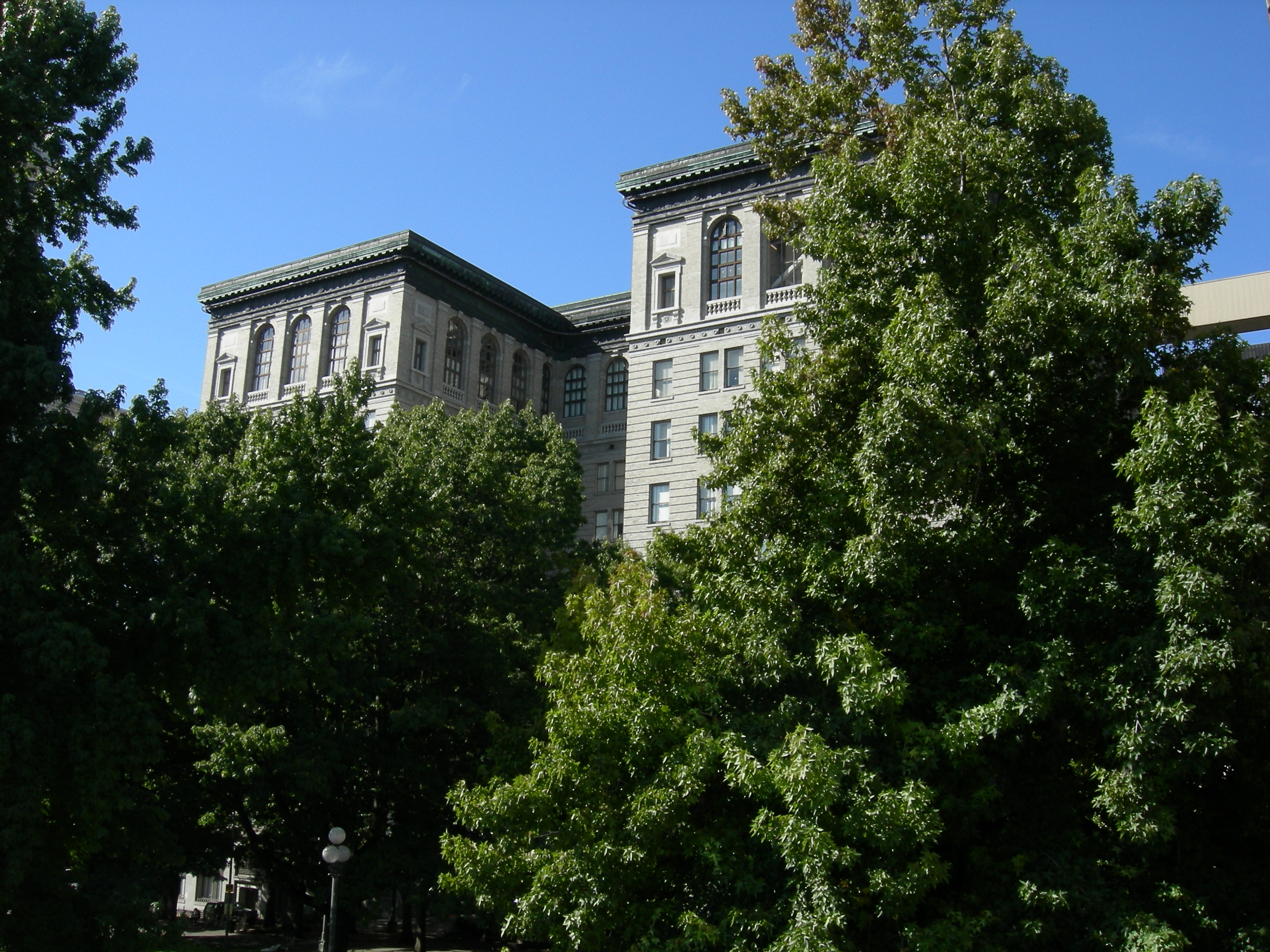
- King County Courthouse, Seattle
- Established: 1891
- Jurisdiction: Seattle, Washington
- Location: Seattle, Washington
- Composition method: Seven elected judges; five appointed magistrates
- Authorised by: Constitution of Washington; City of Seattle Charter
- Appeals to: King County Superior Court
- Website: seattle.gov/courts

Presiding Judge
- Currently: Anita Crawford-Willis

Assistant Presiding Judge
- Currently: Damon Shadid

The Seattle Municipal Court is a city court of limited jurisdiction within King County, Washington. It was created in 1891 by the Washington State Legislature. The court handles misdemeanors, gross misdemeanors, civil offenses, and infractions.

== History ==
Seattle Police Court was the precursor to the Municipal Court. Justices were appointed by the city council among King County Justices of the Peace serving in Seattle. The 1890 Freeholders Charter established a police court in Seattle, but the provision was repealed in 1892 after a state law created a municipal court for the city. The Municipal court was created to be a "court of limited jurisdiction" and heard cased involving violations of state laws and city ordinances in city jurisdiction.

The current Municipal Court was created in 1955 and has jurisdiction over violations of all city ordinances and hears misdemeanor cases. Municipal justices are elected to their positions.

== Jurisdiction and administration ==
The Seattle Municipal Court serves the City of Seattle.

According to Seattle City Ordinance 3.33.010, "[T]he purpose of the Court is to try violations of City ordinances and all other actions brought to enforce or recover license penalties or forfeitures declared or given by any such ordinances and perform such other duties as may be authorized by law."

The administration of security is handled by the Seattle Municipal Court Marshals, who are both law enforcement and security officers for the Seattle Municipal Court.

== Current judges ==
	Name	Assumed office	Current term end	Law school
Judges
Presiding Judge	Anita Crawford-Willis	January 2017	January 2027	Seattle University
Assistant Presiding Judge	Damon Shadid	January 2014	January 2027	University of Houston
Judge	Faye R. Chess	April 2018	January 2027	University of Cincinnati
Judge	Andrea Chin	January 2018	January 2027	Loyola Marymount University
Judge	Willie Gregory	January 2011	January 2027	Seattle University
Judge	Catherine McDowall	September 2020	January 2027	University of Virginia
Judge	Pooja Vaddadi	January 2023	January 2027	Seattle University
Magistrates
Magistrate	Mary Lynch	-	-	Seattle University
Magistrate	Robert Chung	-	-	Seattle University
Magistrate	Seth Niesen	-	-	Gonzaga University
Magistrate	Noah Weil	-	-	Seattle University
Magistrate	Lisa Mansfield	-	-	University of Washington
