= Pete Holmes (politician) =

American lawyer

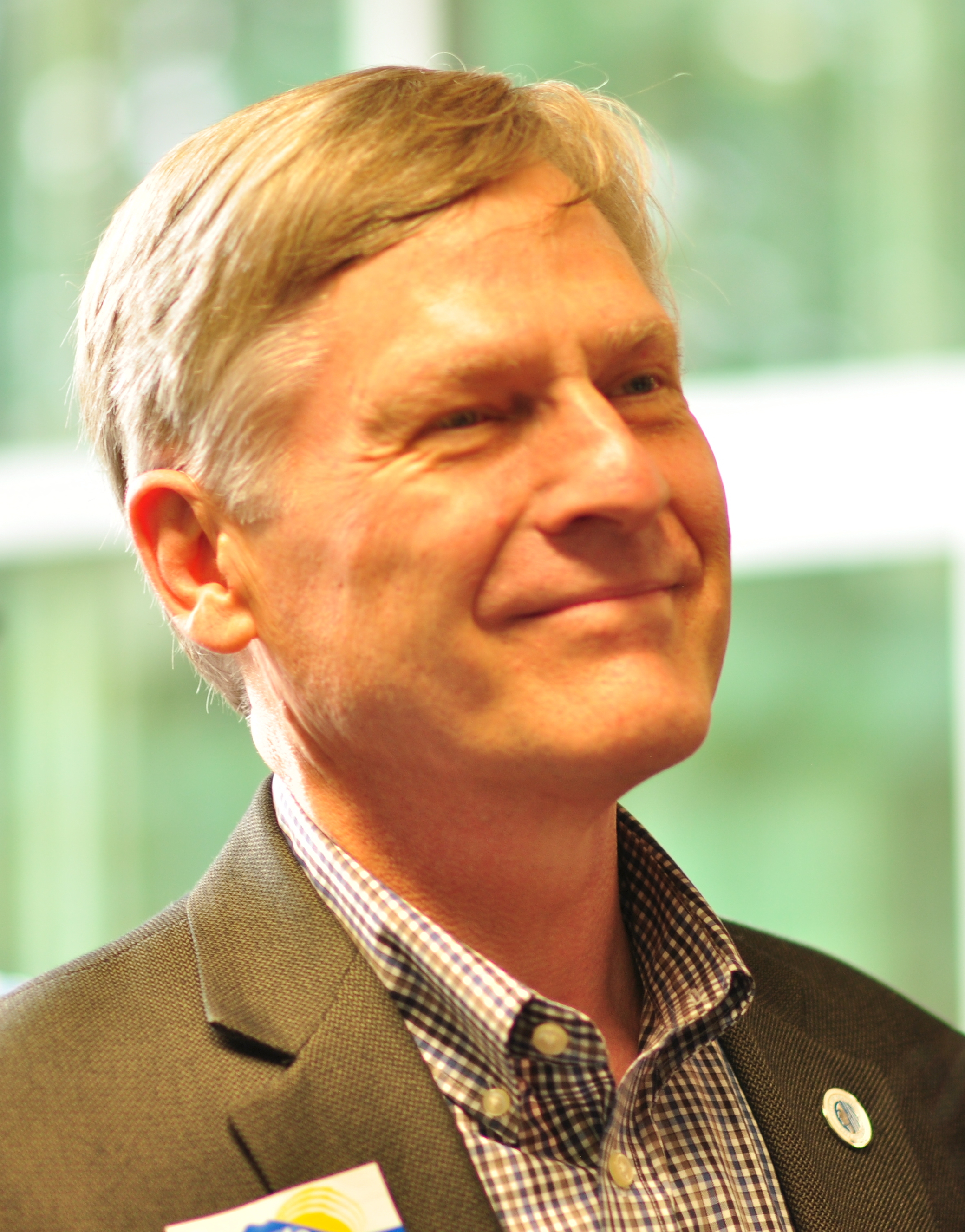
- Holmes in 2017

Seattle City Attorney
- In office January 1, 2010 – January 1, 2022
- Preceded by: Tom Carr
- Succeeded by: Ann Davison

Personal details
- Born: March 21, 1956 (age 70) Richmond, Virginia, U.S.
- Party: Democratic
- Spouse: Ann
- Children: 2
- Education: Yale University (BA); University of Virginia (JD)
- Profession: Attorney

Peter S. Holmes (born March 21, 1956) is an American politician and attorney who served as the Seattle City Attorney from 2010 to 2022. He was elected in November 2009, defeating incumbent Tom Carr, and was re-elected in 2013 and 2017. He failed to advance from the primary in a bid for a fourth term in the 2021 election, coming in third to Republican Ann Davison and progressive Nicole Thomas-Kennedy.

== Early life and education ==
Holmes was born in Richmond, Virginia, and grew up in Buckingham County. He earned a Bachelor of Arts from Yale College, majoring in American studies with a concentration in energy and environmental sciences. After graduating in 1978, Holmes went to work at the Natural Resources Defense Council in Washington D.C. In 1984, he earned his Juris Doctor degree from the University of Virginia School of Law. He remained in private bankruptcy practice in Ohio and Seattle for over 25 years.

Prior to his election, Holmes served as an original member of the Seattle Police Department's Office of Professional Accountability Review Board (OPARB), a citizen review board that reviews police policy and procedures and maintains civilian oversight of the police department. He served as chair of OPARB between 2003 and 2008, during which time he advocated for public release of police records and OPARB reports. As chair, Holmes criticized the police chief for overturning or changing discipline recommendations without giving a reason.

== Seattle City Attorney ==
=== 2009 election ===
In March 2009, Holmes announced that he would challenge incumbent City Attorney Tom Carr, largely because of disagreements over the handling of public disclosure for OPARB and police records, as well as the proper role of the City Attorney. Carr stated that he represented city government and provided "neutral legal advice," whereas Holmes stated that he would act as an advocate for the people of Seattle.

Holmes promised not to prosecute marijuana possession, in line with a 2003 voter-approved initiative making it the lowest priority for law enforcement. Carr maintained that prosecution of possession "in conjunction with other crimes" was within his authority as City Attorney. Holmes said he would consider moving the city’s nine domestic-violence advocates out of the attorney’s office so that they could act with more independence, while Carr said the move would weaken the city's commitment to prosecuting domestic violence cases.

Eventually, Holmes received endorsements from both The Seattle Times and The Stranger. In the November general election, Holmes defeated Carr, 63.85% to 35.92%, a nearly 28-point margin.

=== 2013 election ===
Holmes ran unopposed for a second term.

=== 2017 election ===
Holmes faced one opponent in his second reelection bid, former public-safety adviser to ex-Mayor Ed Murray, Scott Lindsay. Holmes ran on his record as an "incrementalist" in changing the justice system, like not prosecuting certain low-level drug offenses and "driving while poor," and sponsoring an initiative to legalize and regulate recreational marijuana in Washington. Lindsay focused his campaign on progressive change within the city attorney's office to address addiction and homelessness.

Holmes was critical of Lindsay's lack of experience, saying he was woefully inexperienced to run an office of 100 attorneys. He also criticized Lindsay as the architect of the city's homelessness removal, saying Lindsay used "prison labor" to clear encampments. Lindsay denied the claims and accused Holmes of being slow to support Law Enforcement Assisted Diversion (LEAD). Lindsay claimed that the city attorney's office was a "rudderless ship" and said Holmes lacked vision, saying, "Where's the beef?"

In the general election, Holmes defeated Lindsay in a landslide, 75.5% to 24.9%.

=== 2021 election ===
Holmes faced two opponents in this third reelection bid: public defender and police abolitionist Nicole Thomas-Kennedy and Republican arbitrator Ann Davidson. Holmes had a limited campaign, but focused on his work through COVID-19 pandemic and the creation of a peer review board within the city attorney's office. Thomas-Kennedy stated that she would not prosecute most misdemeanors, particularly "crimes of poverty," and would focus the civil division on environmental accountability and wage theft. Davison was critical of Holmes, saying he was too soft on low-level crime, and advocated for "smart prosecuting."

Both Thomas-Kennedy and Davison said that Holmes didn't do enough to enact change and keep Seattleites safe, with Thomas-Kennedy saying his policies were too draconian and Davison saying they were too lax. Holmes ran in the middle of and leading up to the primary warned that he may fall through the middle of his two challengers.

In the August primary, Holmes came in third with 30% of the vote, failing to advance to the general election, while Thomas-Kennedy came in first with 36% and Davison came in second with 32%. In the general election, Davison would defeat Thomas Kennedy, 51% to 47%.

=== Tenure ===
In the winter of 2010-2011, opponents of the Alaskan Way Viaduct replacement tunnel collected signatures to place both an initiative and a referendum opposing the project on the ballot. The proposed initiative, I-101, sought to void the contracts made between the City of Seattle and the State of Washington, while the referendum sought to approve or reject the contracts once they had been finalized by the City Council. In March, Holmes filed a motion with the King County Superior Court seeking a declaratory judgment against the proposed referendum, on the grounds that referendums are typically used to seek citizen review of legislation, not administrative contracts. The court allowed one of the eight sections of the referendum to go to ballot, where construction of the tunnel was eventually approved by voters. Holmes also sued to prevent Initiative 101 from making the same ballot, arguing that a city initiative could not prevent the state from constructing a state highway. The court agreed, and Initiative 101 was struck from the August ballot.

Shortly after taking office, Holmes directed prosecutors to limit sentences for misdemeanor crimes to a maximum of 364 days' imprisonment, one day less than the previous one-year limit. This would avoid automatic deportation of non-citizens sentenced to one year or more. A year later, the Washington State Legislature changed the maximum sentence for misdemeanor crimes to 364 days, in part at Holmes' urging. Legal residents convicted of felonies or misdemeanor domestic violence still faced deportation under the law.

==== Marijuana policy ====
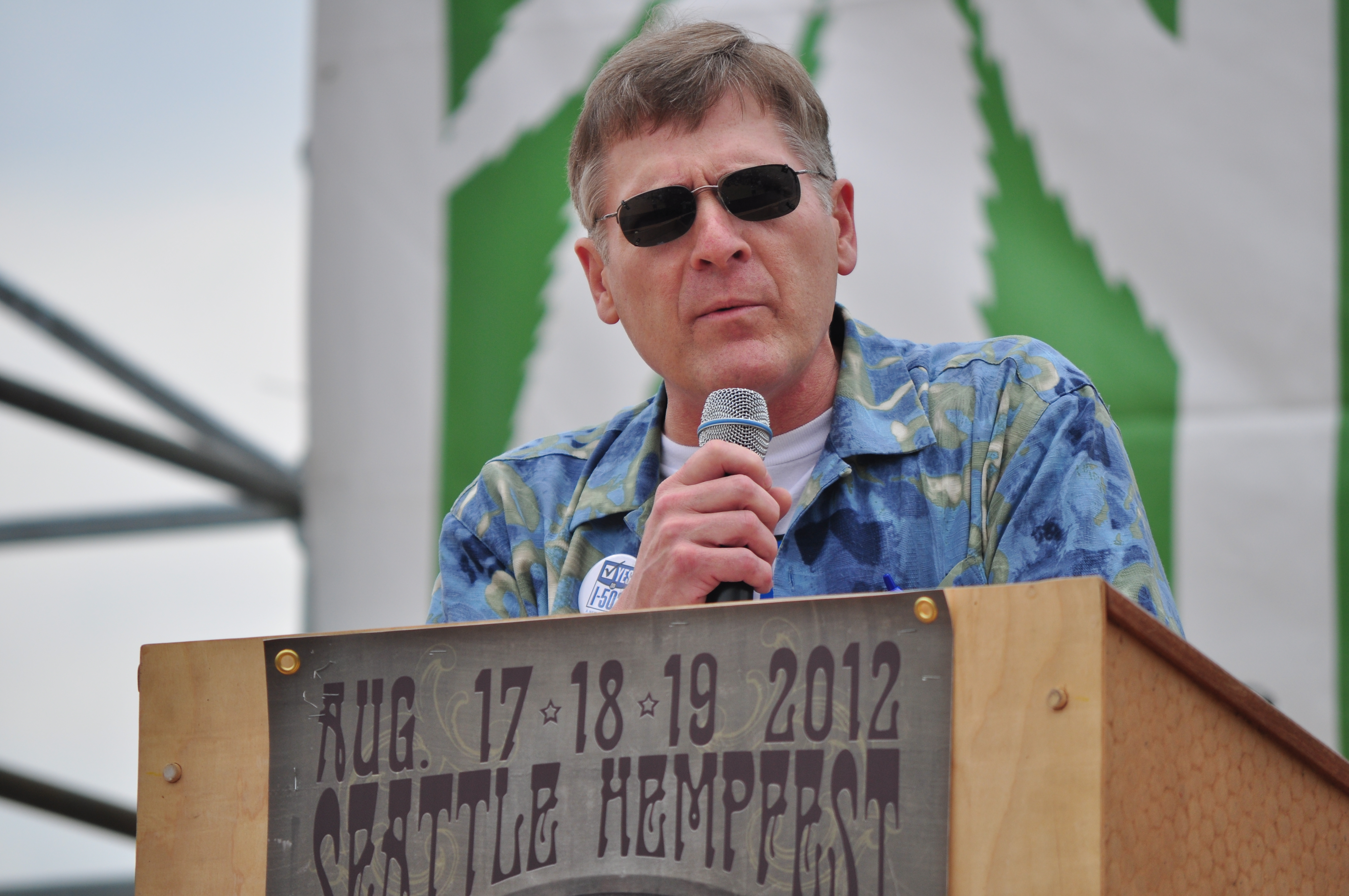
Holmes addressing the crowd from the main stage of the 2012 Seattle Hempfest

In the months after Holmes was elected, arrests for possession of marijuana increased significantly, but none of these cases were prosecuted. He authored an editorial in the Seattle Times calling for legalization, and thereafter sponsored Washington Initiative 502 to legalize, tax and regulate marijuana for adult recreational use.

As one of its earliest sponsors, Holmes edited drafts of the initiative and secured the support of John McKay, a former United States Attorney. Holmes frequently provided his legal opinion in local press, radio, and television broadcasts, and took part in public debates as an advocate of legalization where he framed the issue as a method of confronting racially disproportionate drug enforcement.

On election day, Initiative 502 passed by ten points. In an August 2013 Department of Justice memo, the Obama Administration stated its intent to watch state legalization efforts unfold without intervention. Holmes's involvement in I-502 led to what the state's Public Disclosure Commission characterized as inadvertent, minor violations of state law, due to his failure to consistently keep his advocacy completely separate from the marijuana policy aspects of his city work.

==== Police reforms ====
In 2011, the Seattle Police Department was investigated by the Department of Justice, which found that officers had engaged in a pattern or practice of excessive use of force. The Justice Department alleged that one in every five uses of force by an officer violated the Constitution's protections against illegal search and seizure, and further noted concerns about discriminatory policing. In two separate letters addressed to Holmes, Justice Department attorney Jonathan Smith accused City officials of negotiating in poor faith after several documents related to the investigation were leaked by the City. Shortly after this, Holmes sent the mayor's office a strongly worded letter urging him and the City's negotiating team to cooperate with the Justice Department, and warning that the July 31 negotiating deadline set by the Department was likely the last chance for the City to avoid a federal lawsuit. Following a series of last-minute negotiations, the City and Justice Department arrived at a workable compromise on July 26; a settlement agreement announced the next day included substantial reforms of police practices.

Holmes and the mayor sparred over Merrick Bobb's eventual appointment as federal monitor and approval of the monitor’s first monitoring plan. At the March 12, 2013 status conference, U.S. District Ct Judge James Robart approved Bobb's proposed monitoring plan, effectively ending the public feud between Holmes and the mayor. In the ensuing 2013 campaign, Holmes endorsed the incumbent mayor's opponent, Ed Murray. Murray won the election, along with Holmes, who ran unopposed. Mayor Murray, the candidate endorsed by Holmes, pledged to embrace federal reforms and appointed Kathleen O'Toole to be Seattle's Chief of Police.

Political offices
Preceded by Tom Carr	Seattle City Attorney; 2010 – 2022	Succeeded by Ann Davison
