= 1997 Seattle mayoral election =

- November 4, 1997
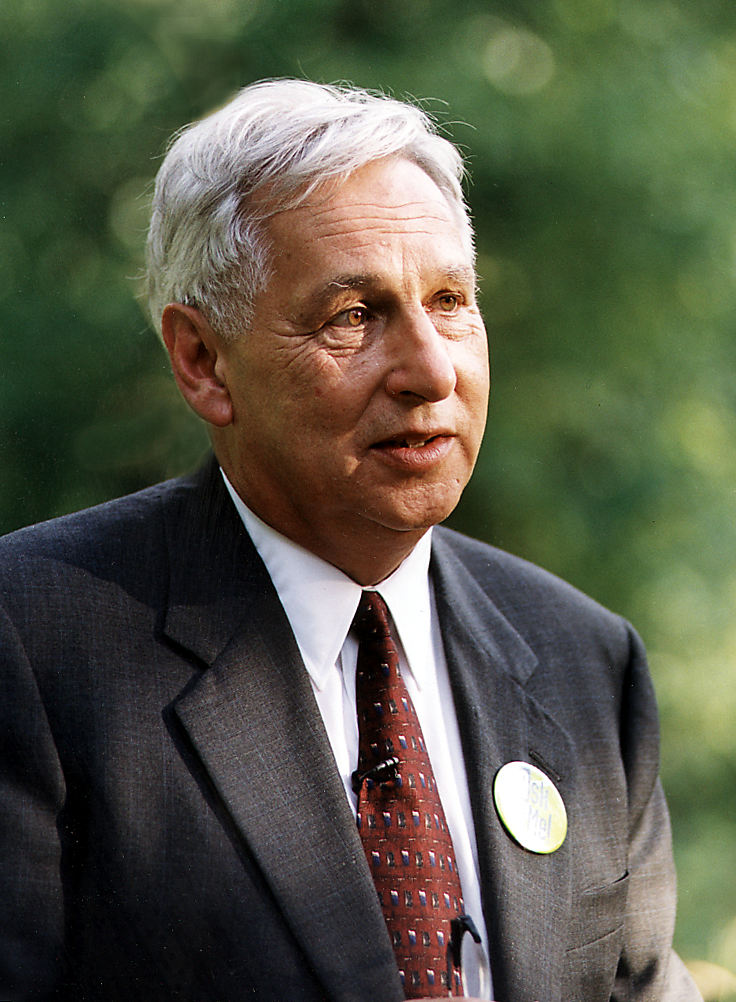

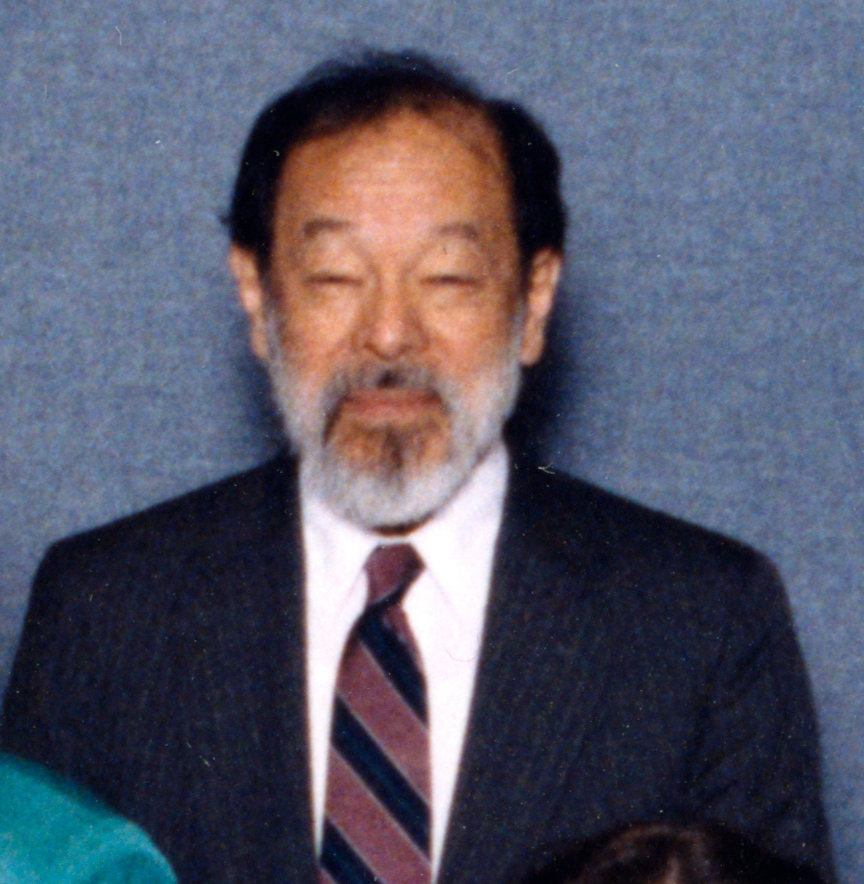
Nominee	Paul Schell	Charlie Chong
Party	Nonpartisan	Nonpartisan
Popular vote	106,414	81,683
Percentage	56.57%	43.43%
Mayor before election
Norm Rice
Nonpartisan
Elected Mayor
Paul Schell
Nonpartisan

The 1997 Seattle mayoral election took place on November 4, 1997, to select the Mayor of Seattle, Washington. Incumbent Mayor Norm Rice, who unsuccessfully ran for governor in 1996, declined to seek re-election to a third term. Eleven candidates ran to succeed him, including Port Commissioner Paul Schell, County Councilman Greg Nickels, and three members of the Seattle City Council: Charlie Chong, Cheryl Chow, and Jane Noland.

In the primary election, Schell placed first, winning 28 percent of the vote. Chong narrowly defeated Nickels for second place, winning 21 percent of the vote to Nickels's 20 percent, a result that took several days to determine as mail ballots were counted. Schell ultimately defeated Chong by a wide margin in the general election, winning 57 percent.

== Primary election ==
=== Candidates ===
- Paul Schell, Port Commissioner
- Charlie Chong, City Councilman
- Greg Nickels, County Councilman
- Jane Noland, City Councilwoman
- Cheryl Chow, City Councilwoman
- Scott A. Breen
- Mike The Mover, perennial candidate
- Gordon Herr, former State Senator
- Jim (Davy Jones XLV) Guilfoil, pirate impersonator
- Stan Lippmann
- Max Englerius

=== Results ===
Primary election results
Candidate	Votes	%
Paul Schell	31,396	28.14%
Charlie Chong	23,725	21.26%
Greg Nickels	22,642	20.29%
Jane Noland	17,633	15.80%
Cheryl Chow	13,192	11.82%
Scott A. Breen	712	0.64%
Mike The Mover	670	0.60%
Gordon Herr	575	0.52%
Jim (Davy Jones XLV) Guilfoil	556	0.50%
Stan Lippmann	262	0.23%
Max Englerius	227	0.20%
Total votes	111,590	100.00%

== General election ==
=== Results ===
1997 Seattle mayoral election
Candidate	Votes	%
Paul Schell	106,414	56.57%
Charlie Chong	81,683	43.43%
Total votes	188,097	100.00%
