= Mark Sidran =

American lawyer

Seattle City Attorney
- In office January 1, 1990 – January 1, 2002
- Preceded by: Douglas Jewett
- Succeeded by: Tom Carr

Personal details
- Born: July 7, 1951 (age 75)
- Party: Democratic
- Education: Harvard University; University of Washington School of Law
- Occupation: Lawyer; Politician

Mark Sidran (born July 7, 1951) is a former Seattle City Attorney, serving three terms from 1990 to 2002. He is remembered most for his controversial "civility" laws.

== Early life ==
Sidran grew up in the Rainier Valley neighborhood of Seattle, Washington. He attended Franklin High School alongside future-Governor Gary Locke and was elected Class President during his senior year. In 1973, he graduated from Harvard University with a bachelor's degree in government. He then returned to Seattle to attend the University of Washington School of Law, graduating in 1976 with a Juris Doctor. Sidran is Jewish.

== Legal career ==
Sidran spent ten years (1975-1985) as a Deputy Prosecuting Attorney in the King County Prosecuting Attorney's Office. Later, as head of the Juvenile Division, he played a major role in the child molestation prosecution of Judge Gary Little.

From 1986 to 1989, Sidran was a partner at McKay & Gaitan. He was also a Special Counsel to Governor Booth Gardner.

In 1990, Sidran ran for and was elected Seattle City Attorney. Sidran was highly controversial for his "no broken windows" approach to law enforcement. He has been called the Rudy Giuliani of Seattle. For example, he sponsored civility ordinances against public urination, public drinking, aggressive panhandling, sleeping in parks, sitting on sidewalks, and driving with a suspended license. His supporters have claimed that these ordinances cleaned up the city significantly, while detractors claim that they unfairly harass the homeless.

== Political career ==
In 2001, Sidran became the Commissioner of the Washington Utilities and Transportation Commission.

In 2001, Sidran ran unsuccessfully for Mayor of Seattle, losing to Greg Nickels. Nickels won with 50.1 percent of the vote compared to Sidran's 48.4 percent. Both candidates had outpolled mayor Paul Schell in the primary. Nickels overcame Sidran's two-to-one fundraising advantage and near-monopoly on press endorsements.

In 2004, Sidran ran unsuccessfully for Attorney General of Washington, losing the primary to Deborah Senn who was in turn defeated by Republican Rob McKenna in the general election.

Political offices
Preceded by Douglas Jewett	Seattle City Attorney; 1990–2002	Succeeded by Tom Carr
