= Lisa Daugaard =

American criminal justice reformer

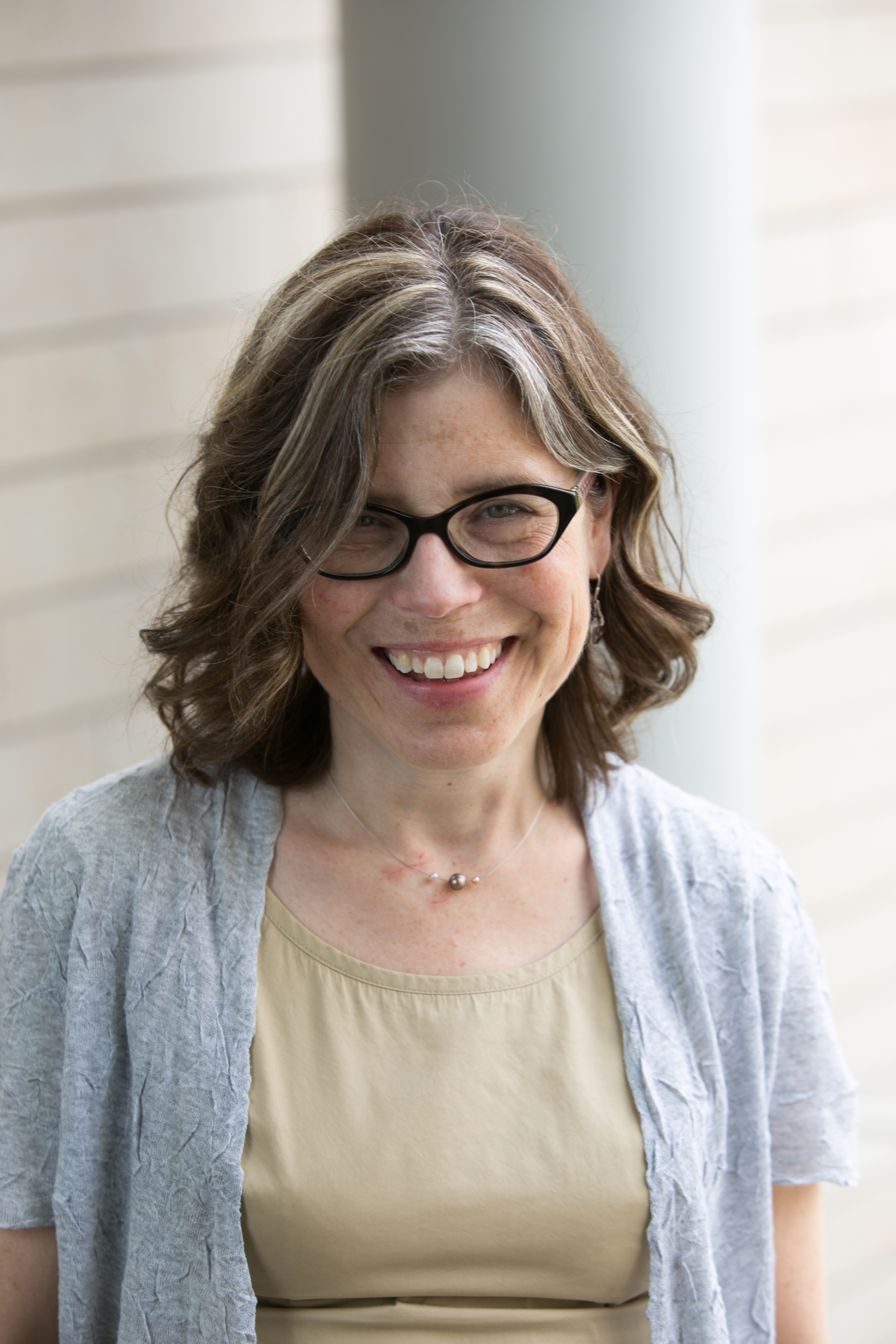
- Daugaard in 2016
- Born: 1965 or 1966 (age 59–60)
- Education: University of Washington (BA); Cornell University (MA); Yale Law School (JD)
- Occupation: Criminal justice reform activist
- Awards: 2019 MacArthur Fellowship

Lisa Daugaard (born 1965/1966) is an American criminal justice reform activist. She is the director of the nonprofit organization Public Defender Association and a commissioner of the Community Police Commission in Seattle. She received a 2019 MacArthur Fellowship for her criminal justice reform work.

== Early life and education ==
Daugaard was born in either 1965 or 1966, and raised in Seattle, Washington. She started college at the University of Washington when she was twelve years old. She completed her B.A. degree in 1983. Daugaard started graduate school at Cornell University at age seventeen, initially studying political science and earning an M.A. degree in 1987, but after repeatedly being arrested and disciplined for her involvement in the campus South Africa divestment movement, she left her Ph.D. program to attend law school. She graduated from Yale Law School with a J.D. degree in 1995.

== Career and legal work ==
After graduating from Yale Law School, Daugaard joined the American Civil Liberties Union, where she continued work on litigation regarding Haitian refugees held at the Guantanamo Bay Naval Base that she had begun at Yale. In 1996, she joined The Defender Association as an attorney. She was a Liman Fellow at the Arthur Liman Center for Public Interest Law from 1998–99. During the 1999 Seattle WTO protests, Daugaard organized the legal defense of activists.

Daugaard started the Racial Disparity Project, a program in Seattle that addresses police use of racial information in law enforcement, in 2001. Ten years later, she helped create Law Enforcement Assisted Diversion (LEAD), a program that diverts low-level offenders in King County, Washington, from the criminal justice system into the social services system. She joined Seattle's Community Police Commission in 2013, first as co-chair, then as a commissioner. As of 2019, she is Executive Director of the Public Defender Association.

== Recognition ==
Daugaard received a 2019 MacArthur Fellowship for her criminal justice reform work. The award citation noted the measurable successes of LEAD, which have resulted in expansion of the LEAD program to other cities and tribal areas across the United States.
