= Seattle City Attorney =

City Attorney of Seattle

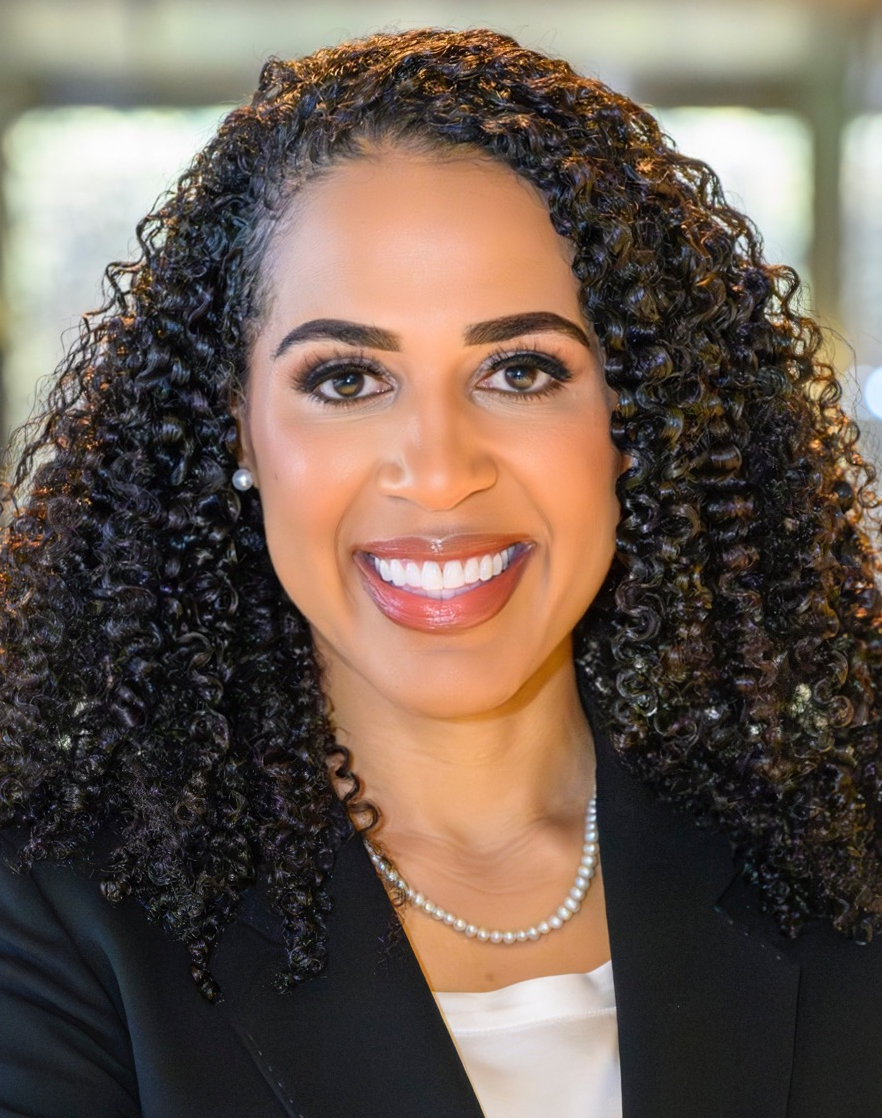
- Incumbent; Erika Evans since January 1, 2026
- Term length: 4 years
- Website: http://www.seattle.gov/law/

The Seattle City Attorney is a non-partisan elected official in Seattle, Washington whose job is to "prosecute people for misdemeanor offenses, defend the city against lawsuits, and gives legal advice to the city". The current city attorney is Erika Evans.

== Departmental organization ==
The city attorney is the head of the Seattle City Law Department, a branch of the Seattle Municipal Government, and the fourth-largest public law office in Washington. There are approximately 90 staff attorneys and 65 support staff. They are split among four divisions:

- Civil: torts (claims), land use, environmental protection, employment, contracts & utilities, government affairs, and regulatory enforcement & economic justice
- Criminal: traffic infractions, misdemeanors, and gross misdemeanors
- Administration: human resources, information technology, budgeting, accounting, internships/externships (approximately 35 law students per year)
- Precinct liaison (with the Seattle Police Department): North, South, East, Southwest, Vice/Narcotics

The city attorney receives a salary of $145,000 per year, making them only the 265th highest paid municipal employee (as of 2012).

The Law Department began issuing a digital newsletter in 2011.

== List of city attorneys ==
- Erika Evans, 2026–present
- Ann Davison, 2022–2026
- Pete Holmes, 2010–2022
- Tom Carr, 2002–2009
- Mark Sidran, 1990–2002
- Douglas Jewett, 1978–1989
- John Harris, 1974–1977
- A.L. Newbould, 1963–1973
- A.C. Van Soelen, 1930–1963
- Thomas Kennedy, 1924–1930
- Walter F. Meier, 1918–1923
