= Vehicle registration plates of the United States for 1979 =

1979 license plates in the United States

Vehicle registration plates of the United States by year
Vehicle registration plates of the United States for 1978	Events of 1979	Vehicle registration plates of the United States for 1980

All of the 50 constituent states of the United States of America plus several of its territories and the District of Columbia issued individual passenger license plates for the year 1979.

== Passenger baseplates ==
Passenger car plates
Image	Region	Design	Slogan	Serial format	Serials issued	Notes
	Alabama	Dark blue embossed digits on reflective white; red Alabama State Capitol graphic in lower center; blue "ALABAMA" in serifed letters centered at top; blue rectangle centered at bottom	"Heart of Dixie" in white letters on red heart at the upper left corner	ABC 123	AAA 001 to approximately HDZ 999	Issued from October 1976 to December 1981. Early plates carried the county of issuance on a sticker over the blue rectangle. Later plates used taller serial dies. Letters I and Q not used in serials.
	Alaska	Embossed red numbers on reflective white plate; standing brown Kodiak bear screened in the center between letters and digits, with pale brown mountain and forest landscape in the background; "ALASKA" embossed in red serifed letters centered at top	None	ABC 123	AAA 100 to ASZ 999	Issued from 1976 to 1980. Letters I, O and Q not used in serial format.
	American Samoa					
	Arizona	Embossed green numbers on reflective pale orange plate with border line; "ARIZONA 73" centered at top	"GRAND CANYON STATE" centered at bottom	ABC-123	PAA-001 to approximately WNJ-999	Issued from 1973 to 1980; revalidated with stickers until 1990.
	Arkansas	Embossed red numbers on reflective white plate; "Arkansas" screened in blue centered at top	"Land of Opportunity" screened in blue centered at bottom	ABC 123	GED 001 to POP 999	Issued from 1978 to 1988.
	California	Gold on blue, embossed state name	None	123 ABC	000 AAA to 999 ZZZ	Issued from 1969 to 1980; monthly staggered registration introduced 1976. I, O and Q not used as first letters in the 123 ABC serial format. Narrower serial dies introduced at the beginning of the WLA series in late 1977, in preparation for the 1ABC123 format.
	Canal Zone	Green on white	Funnel For World Commerce	12345		1979: Rectangular black on red validation sticker with small "Canal Zone" at top, "79" in center, and small "No" and serial number at bottom
	Colorado	Embossed white on reflective green; mountains at top	None	AB-1234	County-coded	
	Connecticut	Embossed reflective (glass-beaded) white numbers on blue plate with border line; "CONNECTICUT" centered at bottom	"CONSTITUTION STATE" at top	AB·1234^{1}	TP·5000 to YZ·9999; ZG·1000 to ZZ·9999	Issued from 1976 to 1980.
	Delaware	Screened gold numbers on reflective dark blue plate with gold border; "DELAWARE" centered at bottom	"THE FIRST STATE" centered at top	123456	4 to 999999^{1-2}	Several variations of the font used for the serial exist. Some replacement plates have riveted numbers.
	District of Columbia	Embossed blue numbers on reflective white plate, embossed blue U.S. Capitol dome graphic used as separator, screened red stripes above and below numbers, "WASHINGTON, D.C." centered at bottom, "3-31" sticker at bottom left, and debossed sticker box at bottom right	"NATION'S CAPITAL" centered at top	123-456	500-001 to 562-000	Issued from April 1, 1978 to March 31, 1979. Monthly staggered registration introduced August 1, 1983. All plates replaced between 1984 and 1986.
	Florida	Embossed green numbers on reflective white plate; orange state map screened to left of center behind numbers; "FLORIDA" centered at top	County name centered at bottom	ABC 123	FBP 000 to YZZ 999; AIA 000 to YQZ 999	Issued from February 1979 to February 1984. 'M' and 'Z' series in the ABC 123 serial format reserved for dealers and rental vehicles respectively. After YZZ 999 was issued in late 1982, serials with I and Q as the first and/or second letters were issued, before the 123 ABC format was introduced. Revalidated with stickers until 1992.
	Georgia	Embossed red on reflective white with border line; "GEORGIA" centered at top; "76" at top left; county name on sticker at bottom	None	ABC 123	TAA 001 to TZZ 999; WAA 001 to approximately WGZ 999	Issued from 1979 to 1980. Letters A through E were used for vehicles weighing 3,000 lb or less; G and H for vehicles between 3,001 lb and 3,500 lb; L, M and N for vehicles between 3,501 lb and 4,000 lb; and R and S for vehicles 4,001 lb or greater.
	Guam		"HAFA ADAI" centered at top			
	Hawaii	Blue on reflective white with border line; "HAWAII" centered at top; pink images of King Kamehameha I and Diamond Head screened in background; red hibiscus screened in top left corner and "76" in top right corner	"ALOHA STATE" centered at bottom	1A-1234; A-12345	County-coded	Issued from 1976 to 1980.
	Idaho	Embossed green numbers on white plate with border line; "IDAHO" centered at top	"FAMOUS POTATOES" centered at bottom	A 12345; A A1234; 0/A 12345; 0/A A1234; 0/A AB123	Coded by county of issuance (A or 0/A)	Issued from 1975 to 1982
	Illinois	Dark blue on reflective white; state name screened in dark blue at top	"Land of Lincoln" centered at bottom	123 456	1 to 999 999	First multi-year base, and first to feature monthly staggered registration. Manufactured in Texas using that state's number dies, and issued in the colors of Illinois College in honor of its sesquicentennial. Vanity plates introduced 1980. Replaced from 1984 to 1986.
	Indiana	Brown serial on reflective white, yellow and brown background	"1779 George Rogers Clark" at bottom	0A1234; 00A1234	County-coded	Awarded "Plate of the Year" for best new license plate of 1979 by the Automobile License Plate Collectors Association, the first and, to date, only time Indiana has been so honored. Plates expired from January 31 through June 30, 1980.
	Iowa	Reflective white numbers on green plate with border line; "IOWA" and county name centered at top and bottom respectively; "79" at top right. Plate elements either embossed (above) or debossed (below)	County name centered at bottom	ABC 123	AAA 000 to approximately KCZ 999	Issued from 1979 to 1985. County codes abolished after 57 years, replaced by county names at bottom of plate. Whether the plate was embossed or debossed depended on the county of issuance. The serial blocks initially assigned were the same as those on the 1975–78 base. Non-resident plates had blank bottoms.
	Kansas	Embossed white numbers on dark blue plate with state-shaped border; "KANSAS 76" centered at top	None	A/B C12345	Coded by county of issuance (A/B) and month of expiration (C)	Issued from 1975 to 1980.
	Kentucky	Embossed dark blue numbers on white plate; "KY" at top left and top right; debossed box for expiration sticker centered at top; county-name sticker centered at bottom	None	ABC-123	AAA-000 to approximately GFZ-999	Issued from 1977 to 1983; monthly staggered registration introduced.
	Louisiana	Embossed black numbers on reflective white plate with border line; "LOUISIANA" centered at bottom	"SPORTSMAN'S PARADISE" centered at top	123A456	Letter corresponds to State Police troop area of issue	Issued from 1978 to 1983.
	Maine	Embossed black numbers on reflective white plate with border line; "MAINE" centered at top	"VACATIONLAND" centered at bottom	12345 A	1 A to 52000 N	Issued from 1979 to June 30, 1987.
	Maryland	Embossed red numbers on white plate; border line around plate and around sticker spot at top right; "MARYLAND" centered at top	None	ABC 123	AAA 001 to approximately HNB 999	Issued from April 1975 to March 1980.
	Massachusetts	Embossed green numbers on reflective white plate with border line; "MASSACHUSETTS" centered at top	None	123·ABC	100·AAA to 999·VZZ (see right)	Only rear plates issued (except for reserved and non-passenger plates). On all plates, the last digit corresponded to the month of expiration, with November and December expirations discontinued except on non-passenger plates and on red-and-white plates until 1980–81. All-numeric plates were generally issued to holders of the same serials on the red-on-white base. Still currently revalidated.
	Michigan	Embossed reflective (glass-beaded) white numbers on black plate with border line; "19 MICHIGAN 79" at top	"GREAT LAKE STATE" centered at bottom	ABC-123	BBB-000 to ZZZ-999	Issued from 1979 to 1982. Serials BBB-000 through NVM-999 were issued by county. Front and rear plates issued until April 1, 1981; only rear plates have been issued ever since.
	Minnesota	Embossed blue numbers on reflective graphic plate featuring a lake scene with pale blue and white water, pale blue sky, green island and trees, and a small green canoe; "Minnesota" screened in blue centered at top	"10,000 lakes" screened in blue centered at bottom	ABC 123	CHA 001 to approximately FOR 999	Issued from 1978 to 1982.
	Mississippi	Embossed red numbers on reflective white plate with border line; green magnolia graphic screened in the center; "MISSISSIPPI" screened in green italic serifed letters centered at top; county name embossed in red block letters centered at bottom	"The Hospitality State" centered in middle	ABC 123	Issued in blocks by county	First graphic plate; staggered registration also introduced. Awarded "Plate of the Year" for best new license plate of 1977 by the Automobile License Plate Collectors Association, the first time Mississippi was so honored. Some plates had the magnolia graphic in a darker shade of green.
	Missouri	Embossed reflective (glass-beaded) white numbers on blue plate with border line; "MISSOURI" centered at bottom, month of expiration at bottom left and "79" at bottom right	None	AA1-234	First letter corresponds to month of expiration	
	Montana	Embossed sky blue numbers on reflective white plate with screened red state-shaped border; red "76 Bicentennial" logo and sky blue buffalo skull screened at top left and bottom left corners respectively; red band screened above numbers containing "MONTANA" in white block letters; screened sky blue "'76" in bottom right corner	"BIG SKY" screened in sky blue block letters centered at bottom	1·123456; 10·12345	Coded by county of issuance (1 or 10)	A straight-line die was originally used for the number '1', before being replaced by a serifed version.
	Nebraska	Red on reflective white with sky blue banner at bottom, Conestoga wagon graphic at top left and Native American chief graphic at top right	1776 BICENTENNIAL 1976	1-A1234; 1-AB123; 10-A123; 10-AB12; 2/1-A1234; 5/9-A1234	Coded by county of issuance (1 or 10)	Issued from 1976 to 1984. Only base on which Scotts Bluff County, as well as Sarpy County, used five-character serials with stacked county codes.
	Nevada	Debossed white numbers on reflective blue plate with border line; "NEVADA" centered at top offset to left	None	A12345; AB1234; ABC123	Coded by county of issuance	Issued from 1974 to 1981.
	New Hampshire	Embossed forest green numbers on reflective white plate with border line; "NEW HAMPSHIRE" centered at bottom	"LIVE FREE OR DIE" centered at top	123456	1 to 999999	Issued from January 1979 to December 1983.
	New Jersey	Embossed buff lettering on medium blue plate, non-reflective, "NEW JERSEY" embossed in plain block letters centered at top	"GARDEN STATE" embossed in plain block letters centered at bottom	123-ABC; New Jersey state icon used as dash	100-LAA to 999-ZZZ^{2, 5}	Some of these plates were overpainted.
	New Mexico	Embossed red numbers on yellow plate, embossed Zia sun symbol used as separator, "NEW MEXICO" centered at bottom, stamped indentation at top center for county-name sticker	"LAND OF ENCHANTMENT" centered between numbers and state name	ABC-123	CCX-001 to approximately EGZ-999	Issued from 1978 to 1982.
	New York	Embossed dark blue numbers on reflective orange plate; border lines around plate and around registration sticker spot at bottom right; "NEW YORK" centered at bottom	None	12-ABC; 123-ABC^{1}	County-coded	Numbers 51 through 999 were used on the 12-ABC and 123-ABC serial formats. Narrower dies introduced 1979 to accommodate 1234-ABC format. All plates revalidated with windshield decals; plate stickers never used despite sticker box.
	North Carolina	Embossed red numbers on reflective white plate with border line, "NORTH CAROLINA" at bottom	None	ABC-123	PNA-101 to approximately SXZ-999	First base to be revalidated with stickers. Monthly staggered registration introduced 1981. Plates from AAA-101 through JAY-999 replaced 1982; all other plates replaced by 1992.
	North Dakota	Embossed green numbers on reflective white plate with border line; "N.DAKOTA" at top left and "74" at top right	"PEACE GARDEN STATE" at bottom	123-456	1 to approximately 580-000	Issued from 1974 to 1979.
	Northern Mariana; Islands					
	Ohio	Red on reflective white	None	123456; A 12345; AB 1234; 12345 A 1234 AB; A 1234 B	Issued in blocks by county	Issued from the 1976 to 1979.
	Oklahoma	Embossed blue numbers on reflective white plate; "OKLAHOMA" centered at top; debossed sticker boxes in top corners with "79" further debossed in right box	None	AB-1234; ABC-1234	County-coded	Issued from 1979 to 1980; monthly staggered registration introduced.
	Oregon	Embossed blue numbers on golden yellow plate; border line around plate and around registration year sticker spot at bottom right; "OREGON" centered at bottom; month of expiration at bottom left	None	ABC 123	First letter corresponds to month of expiration	Issued from 1973 to 1985; serials for each month continued from where the 1964 to 1973 plates left off.
	Pennsylvania	Blue on reflective yellow with large keystone separator	"Keystone State" centered at bottom	ABC-123	AAA-000 to GZZ-999	Staggered registration introduced 1979–80. Sticker validation through 2000.
	Rhode Island	Embossed black numbers on reflective white plate with border line; "RHODE ISLAND" centered at bottom	"OCEAN STATE" centered at top	AB-123	Unused and reissued 1967–71 serials	Issued from 1972 to 1979; only to new registrants. During 1977, some plates were manufactured in New York, using that state's number dies (with the letters taller than the digits) and omitting the slogan.
	South Carolina	Embossed blue numbers on reflective white plate; red Sabal palmetto and blue cannon screened in the center; "1775" and "1783" screened in blue on either side of cannon; red band screened at bottom containing "SOUTH CAROLINA" in white in the center	"1776 Bicentennial 1976" screened in blue at top	ABC 123	AAA 101 to WZZ 400; AAA 401 to WZZ 500	Issued from 1976 to December 1979. Commemorated both the U.S. Bicentennial and the Revolutionary War. Numbers 101 to 400 issued for each three-letter series first, followed by numbers 401 to 500 from 1978. I, O, P, Q, U and Y used only as overflow letters; this practice continued until 1985.
	South Dakota	Embossed blue on white with screened blue and white Mount Rushmore graphic and three red stripes at top	None	AB:1234	Coded by county of issuance (AB)	Issued from 1976 to 1980.
	Tennessee	Embossed dark blue numbers on reflective white plate; pale yellow state seal screened in the center behind numbers; blue banner graphic screened at top containing "TENNESSEE" in white in the center	"Volunteer State" screened in blue centered at bottom	1-A1234; 1-AB123; 10-A123; 10-AB12	Coded by county of issuance (1 or 10)	First base not to feature the state shape since 1935, and first to use the full state name since 1936. Monthly staggered registration introduced. Some plates manufactured in Texas using that state's serial dies.
	Texas	Black on reflective white, Texas state-shaped separator	None	ABC-123	MMV-501 to ZZZ-999	Issued from 1976 to 1981. Letters I and O not used in serials; this practice continued until 1990. Staggered registration introduced 1978.
	Utah	Black on reflective white; "UTAH" centered at bottom	None	ABC 123	MLA 001 to WWK 999; LLL 001 to approximately MVW 999	Three-letter series used a split-alphabet system, with each letter advancing A, B, C, D, E, F, H, J, K (block 1), or L, M, N, P, R, S, T, V, W (block 2). Progression was as follows: all three letters in block 1, then first letter in block 2 and last two letters in block 1, then first two letters in block 2 and last letter in block 1, then all three letters in block 2, and finally first two letters in block 1 and last letter in block 2. On the 1974–78 variant, two different designs of beehive were used - one rounded, the other pointed. All variants are still currently revalidated.
	Vermont	Debossed white numbers on green plate with border line; "VERMONT" centered at bottom; round sticker box at bottom left and rectangular sticker box at bottom right	"GREEN MOUNTAINS" centered at top	A·1234	A·100 to Y·9999	Issued from 1977 to 1984. Round sticker box never used; revalidated until 1989.
	Virginia	Embossed blue numbers on white plate with border line; "VIRGINIA" centered at top	None	ABC-123	AAA-101 to SZZ-999	Issued from 1973 to 1979; revalidated with stickers until 1984. 'R' series of serials reserved for rental cars; this practice continued until the late 1990s.
	Virginia	Embossed dark blue serial on reflective white plate with border line; "Virginia" screened in blue centered at top.	None	ABC-123		Still currently revalidated.
	Washington	Embossed green numbers on reflective white plate with border line; "WASHINGTON" centered at bottom	None	ABC 123	County-coded (until 1981)	
	West Virginia	Embossed dark blue numbers on reflective white plate; yellow state shape with blue outline screened at left behind numbers; "WEST VIRGINIA" screened in dark blue centered at bottom.	Dark blue bar screened at top with "Wild, Wonderful" in white in the center	0A-1234; AA-1234	First character corresponds to month of expiration	Issued from 1976 to 1982.
	Wisconsin	Embossed red numbers on reflective white plate; "WISCONSIN" centered at bottom; month of expiration at bottom left; debossed "73" at bottom right	"AMERICA'S DAIRYLAND" centered at top	A12-345; AA 1234	First letter corresponds to month of expiration	Issued from 1973 to 1979. Revalidated for 1979 with yellow on black stickers.
	Wyoming	Embossed brown numbers and Bucking Horse and Rider on white plate; brown wooden fence graphic screened at bottom; "WYOMING" screened in Wild West-style font on wooden sign graphic at top, offset to right; "78" screened in same manner in top left corner	None	1-1234; 1-123A/B; 1/0-1234; 1/0-123A/B	Coded by county of issuance (1 or 1/0)	Issued from 1978 to 1982. Awarded "Plate of the Year" for best new license plate of 1978 by the Automobile License Plate Collectors Association, the second time Wyoming was so honored.

== Non-passenger plates ==
Non-passenger Plates
Image (standard)	Region	Type	Design and slogan	Serial format	Serials issued	Notes
	Maine	Trailer	Embossed black serial on reflective white plate with border line; "MAINE 74" at top offset to left, "TRAILER" at bottom	123-456	1 to approximately 125-000, 150-001 to 205-000	Revalidated for 1979 with white on red stickers.
	Maine	Trailer	Embossed black serial on reflective white plate with border line; "MAINE 74" at top, "TRAILER" at bottom	123-456	125-001 to approximately 150-000	Revalidated for 1979 with white on red stickers.
	Maine	Trailer	Embossed black serial on reflective white plate with border line; "MAINE" at top left, "TRAILER" at bottom	123-456	205-001 to approximately 362-000	Revalidated for 1979 with white on red stickers.
	Maine	Trailer	Embossed black serial on reflective white plate with border line; "MAINE" at top, "TRAILER" at bottom	123-456	362-001 to approximately 599-999	Revalidated for 1979 with white on red stickers.
	Maryland	Temporary				
	Wisconsin	Insert trailer	Embossed white serial on light blue plate; "WISCONSIN" at bottom, "TRAILER" at top; "78" at bottom right	A/B1234	Coded by weight class (A)	Validated with quarterly stickers. The sticker colors for each quarter are as follows: 1 - green on yellow, 2 - green on white, 3 - white on green, 4 - green on orange. Weight classes are A, B, C, D, E, F, G, H, J, K, L, N, P, Q, R, S, and T.
	Wisconsin	Insert trailer	Embossed white serial on light blue plate; "WISCONSIN" at bottom, "TRAILER" at top; "78" at bottom right	C/Z1234	C/Z 1 to approximately C/Z4000	Validated with quarterly stickers. The sticker colors for each quarter are as follows: 1 - green on yellow, 2 - green on white, 3 - white on green, 4 - green on orange. Weight classes are A, B, C, D, E, F, G, H, J, K, L, N, P, Q, R, S, and T.

== See also ==
- Antique vehicle registration
- Electronic license plate
- Motor vehicle registration
- Vehicle license
