= Vehicle registration plates of the United States for 1978 =

1978 license plates in the United States

Vehicle registration plates of the United States by year
Vehicle registration plates of the United States for 1977	Events of 1978	Vehicle registration plates of the United States for 1979

Each of the 50 states of the United States of America plus several of its territories and the District of Columbia issued individual passenger license plates for 1978.

== Passenger baseplates ==
Passenger car plates
Image	Region	Design	Slogan	Serial format	Serials issued	Notes
	Alabama	Embossed blue serial on reflective white plate; red Alabama State Capitol graphic screened in the center; state flag, blue rectangle and U.S. Bicentennial logo screened at bottom; "ALABAMA" screened in blue centered at top.	"HEART OF DIXIE" in white within red heart screened at top left	ABC 123		
	Alaska					
	American Samoa					
	Arizona					
	Arkansas	Embossed red numbers on reflective white plate; "Arkansas" screened in blue centered at top	"Land of Opportunity" screened in blue centered at bottom	ABC 123	GED 001 to POP 999	Issued from 1978 to 1988.
	California					
	Canal Zone					
	Colorado					
	Connecticut					
	Delaware	1969 base with 1978 sticker				
	District of Columbia					
	Florida					
	Georgia					
	Guam					
	Hawaii					
	Idaho					
	Illinois					
	Indiana	Black embossed serial and red screened state name on reflective white plate with light blue Indianapolis 500 race cars in the background, background reflective	none	0A1234; 00A1234	County-coded	Indianapolis 500 race cars in background. This issue is thought by some to be a tribute to Tony Hulman, owner of the Indianapolis Motor Speedway, who died in 1977; sample plates, normally numbered 00A0000 in most years, were numbered 00H0000 this year, lending some credence to this belief. Plates expired from January 31 through June 30, 1979.
	Iowa					
	Kansas					
	Kentucky					
	Louisiana					
	Maine					
	Maryland					
	Massachusetts					
	Michigan					
	Minnesota					
	Mississippi					
	Missouri					
	Montana					
	Nebraska					
	Nevada					
	New Hampshire					
	New Jersey					
	New Mexico					
	New York					
	North Carolina					
	North Dakota					
	Northern Mariana; Islands					
	Ohio					
	Oklahoma					
	Oregon					
	Pennsylvania					
	Puerto Rico					
	Rhode Island					
	South Carolina					
	South Dakota					
	Tennessee					
	Texas					
	Utah					
	Vermont					
	Virginia					
	Washington					
	West Virginia	Embossed dark blue numbers on reflective white plate; yellow state shape with blue outline screened at left behind numbers; "WEST VIRGINIA" screened in dark blue centered at bottom.	Dark blue bar screened at top with "Wild, Wonderful" in white in the center			
	Wisconsin	Embossed red serial on white plate; "WISCONSIN" at bottom, slogan at top; month of expiration at bottom left, debossed "73" at bottom right	AMERICA'S DAIRYLAND	A12-345; AB 1234	Coded by month of expiration (A)	Revalidated for 1978 with white on blue stickers
	Wyoming					

== Non-passenger plates ==
Non-passenger Plates
Image (standard)	Region	Type	Design & Slogan	Serial format	Serials issued	Notes
	Maine	Trailer	Embossed black serial on reflective white plate with border line; "MAINE 74" at top offset to the left, "TRAILER" at bottom	123-456	1 to approximately 125-000, 150-001 to 205-000	Revalidated for 1978 with white on dark green stickers.
	Maine	Trailer	Embossed black serial on reflective white plate with border line; "MAINE 74" at top, "TRAILER" at bottom	123-456	125-001 to approximately 150-000	Revalidated for 1978 with white on dark green stickers.
	Maine	Trailer	Embossed black serial on reflective white plate with border line; "MAINE" at top left, "TRAILER" at bottom	123-456	205-001 to approximately 362-000	Revalidated for 1978 with white on dark green stickers.
	Maryland	Temporary				
	Wisconsin	Insert trailer	Embossed white serial on light blue plate; "WISCONSIN" at bottom, "TRAILER" at top; "78" at bottom right	A/B1234	Coded by weight class (A)	Revalidated with quarterly stickers. The stickers for each quarter are as follows: 1 - black on orange, 2 - black on yellow, 3 - white on red, 4 - black on white. Weight classes are A, B, C, D, E, F, G, H, J, K, L, N, P, Q, R, S, and T.
	Wisconsin	Insert trailer	Embossed white serial on light blue plate; "WISCONSIN" at bottom, "TRAILER" at top; "78" at bottom right	C/Z1234	CZ 1 to approximately CZ4000	Revalidated with quarterly stickers. The stickers for each quarter are as follows: 1 - black on orange, 2 - black on yellow, 3 - white on red, 4 - black on white. Weight classes are A, B, C, D, E, F, G, H, J, K, L, N, P, Q, R, S, and T.

== See also ==
- Antique vehicle registration
- Electronic license plate
- Motor vehicle registration
- Vehicle license
