= Vehicle registration plates of the United States for 1975 =

1975 license plates in the United States

Vehicle registration plates of the United States by year
Vehicle registration plates of the United States for 1974	Events of 1975	Vehicle registration plates of the United States for 1976

Each of the 50 states of the United States of America plus several of its territories and the District of Columbia issued individual passenger license plates for 1975.

== Passenger baseplates ==
Passenger car plates
Image	Region	Design	Slogan	Serial format	Serials issued	Notes
	Alabama					
	Alaska					
	American Samoa					
	Arizona					
	Arkansas					
	California					
	Canal Zone					
	Colorado					
	Connecticut					
	Delaware					
	District of Columbia					
	Florida	Embossed red serial on reflective white plate with border line; "FLORIDA" centered at top; "75" at top left	"SUNSHINE STATE" centered at bottom			Coded by county of issuance (1 or 10) and weight class. Revalidated with stickers until 1980.
	Georgia					
	Guam					
	Hawaii					
	Idaho					
	Illinois	Black on reflective yellow with border line; "19 ILLINOIS 75" at top.	"LAND OF LINCOLN" centered at bottom			*Issued in the colors of Peoria-based Caterpillar Inc., in honor of its 50th anniversary. *Three-letter prefix program expanded from about 800 combinations in 1974 to 2,851.
	Indiana					
	Iowa					
	Kansas					
	Kentucky					
	Louisiana					
	Maine					
	Maryland					
	Massachusetts					
	Michigan					
	Minnesota					
	Mississippi					
	Missouri					
	Montana					
	Nebraska					
	Nevada					
	New Hampshire					
	New Jersey					
	New Mexico					
	New York					
	North Carolina					
	North Dakota					
	Northern Mariana; Islands					
	Ohio					
	Oklahoma					
	Oregon					
	Pennsylvania					
	Puerto Rico					
	Rhode Island					
	South Carolina					
	South Dakota					
	Tennessee					
	Texas					
	Utah					
	Vermont					
	Virginia					
	Virgin Islands					
	Washington					
	West Virginia					
	Wisconsin					
	Wyoming					

== Non-passenger plates ==
Non-passenger plates
Image	Region	Type	Design and slogan	Serial format	Serials issued	Notes
	Colorado	Trailer	Embossed red serial on red background; "TRAILER" centered at top; "19 COLORADO 75" at bottom			

== See also ==
- Antique vehicle registration
- Electronic license plate
- Motor vehicle registration
- Vehicle license
