= Vehicle registration plates of the United States for 1973 =

1973 license plates in the United States

Vehicle registration plates of the United States by year
| Vehicle registration plates of the United States for 1972 | Events of 1973 | Vehicle registration plates of the United States for 1974 |

Each of the 50 states of the United States of America plus several of its territories and the District of Columbia issued individual passenger license plates for 1973.

== Passenger baseplates ==
Passenger car plates
| Image (standard) | Region | Design | Slogan | Serial format | Serials issued | Notes |
|---|---|---|---|---|---|---|
| | Alabama | | | | | |
| | Alaska | | | | | |
| | American Samoa | | | | | |
| | Arizona | | | | | |
| | Arkansas | | | | | |
| | California | | | | | |
| | Canal Zone | | | | | |
| | Colorado | | | | | |
| | Connecticut | | | | | |
| | Delaware | | | | | |
| | District of Columbia | | | | | Sample plate shown. |
| | District of Columbia | | | | | Limited time use around Inauguration Day. |
| | Florida | | | | | |
| | Georgia | | | | | |
| | Guam | | | | | |
| | Hawaii | | | | | |
| | Idaho | | | | | |
| | Illinois | | | | | |
| | Indiana | | | | | |
| | Iowa | | | | | |
| | Kansas | | | | | |
| | Kentucky | | | | | |
| | Louisiana | | | | | |
| | Maine | | | | | |
| | Maryland | | | | | |
| | Massachusetts | | | | | |
| | Michigan | | | | | |
| | Minnesota | | | | | |
| | Mississippi | | | | | |
| | Missouri | | | | | |
| | Montana | | | | | |
| | Nebraska | | | | | |
| | Nevada | | | | | |
| | New Hampshire | | | | | Vanity plate shown. |
| | New Jersey | | | | | |
| | New Mexico | | | | | |
| | New York | | none | | | Validated with a sticker on the license plate. |
| | New York | | none | | | Validated by a windshield sticker. |
| | North Carolina | Embossed red serial on reflective white plate with border line; "19" at top left and "73" at top right; "NORTH CAROLINA" at bottom | none | ABC-123 | AAA-101 to approximately HVA-999 | |
| | North Dakota | | | | | |
| | Northern Mariana; Islands | | | | | |
| | Ohio | | | | | |
| | Oklahoma | | | | | |
| | Oregon | | | | | |
| | Pennsylvania | | | | | |
| | Puerto Rico | | | | | |
| | Rhode Island | | | | | |
| | South Carolina | | | | | |
| | South Dakota | | | | | |
| | Tennessee | | | | | |
| | Texas | | | | | |
| | Utah | | | | | There are many variations including sticker wells, beehive graphic in the center, and placement of "Utah" with/without the year. Validation by a year/month sticker. |
| | Vermont | | | | | |
| | Virginia | | | | | |
| | Washington | | | | | |
| | West Virginia | | | | | |
| | Wisconsin | Embossed red serial on white plate; "WISCONSIN" at bottom, slogan at top; month of expiration at bottom left, debossed "73" at bottom right | AMERICA'S DAIRYLAND | A12-345; AB 1234 | Coded by month of expiration (A) | |
| | Wyoming | | | | | |

== Non-passenger plates ==
Non-passenger plates
| Image (standard) | Region | Type | Design & Slogan | Serial format | Serials issued | Notes |
|---|---|---|---|---|---|---|
| | Maryland | Temporary | | | | |
| | Wisconsin | Light trailer | Embossed black serial on teal plate; "WISCONSIN" at bottom, "TRAILER" at top; "70" at bottom left | A12345 | A 1 to approximately A12000 | Revalidated to 1973 with black on white stickers |

== See also ==
- Antique vehicle registration
- Electronic license plate
- Motor vehicle registration
- Vehicle license
