= Vehicle registration plates of the United States for 1976 =

1976 license plates in the United States

Vehicle registration plates of the United States by year
Vehicle registration plates of the United States for 1975	Events of 1976	Vehicle registration plates of the United States for 1977

Each of the 50 constituent states of the United States of America plus several of its territories and the District of Columbia issued individual passenger license plates for 1976.

== Passenger baseplates ==
Passenger car plates
Image	Region	Design	Slogan	Serial format	Serials issued	Notes
	Alabama					
	Alaska					
	American Samoa					
	Arizona					
	Arkansas					
	California					
	Canal Zone					
	Colorado					
	Connecticut					
	Delaware					
	District of Columbia					
	Florida	Embossed red serial on reflective white plate with border line; "FLORIDA" centered at top; "75" at top left	"SUNSHINE STATE" centered at bottom			Coded by county of issuance (1 or 10) and weight class. Monthly staggered registration introduced July 1976, with each plate expiring in the same month as the registrant's birthday. Revalidated with stickers until 1980.
	Georgia					
	Guam					
	Hawaii					
	Idaho					
	Illinois					
	Indiana					
	Iowa					
	Kansas					
	Kentucky					
	Louisiana					
	Maine					
	Maryland					
	Massachusetts					
	Michigan					
	Minnesota					
	Mississippi					
	Missouri					
	Montana					
	Nebraska					
	Nevada					
	New Hampshire					
	New Jersey					
	New Mexico					
	New York					
	North Carolina					
	North Dakota					
	Northern Mariana; Islands					
	Ohio					
	Oklahoma					
	Oregon					
	Pennsylvania					
	Puerto Rico					
	Rhode Island					
	South Carolina					
	South Dakota					
	Tennessee					
	Texas					
	Utah					
	Vermont					
	Virginia					
	Virgin Islands					
	Washington					
	West Virginia	Embossed dark blue numbers on reflective white plate; yellow state shape with blue outline screened at left behind numbers; "WEST VIRGINIA" screened in dark blue centered at bottom.	Dark blue bar screened at top with "Wild, Wonderful" in white in the center			
	Wisconsin	Embossed red serial on reflective white plate; "WISCONSIN" at bottom, slogan at top; month of expiration at bottom left, debossed "73" at bottom right	AMERICA'S DAIRYLAND	A12-345; AB 1234	Coded by month of expiration (A)	Revalidated for 1976 with yellow on blue stickers.
	Wyoming					

== Non-passenger plates ==
Non-passenger plates
Image	Region	Type	Design and slogan	Serial format	Serials issued	Notes
	Maine	Trailer	Embossed black serial on reflective white plate with border line; "MAINE 74" offset left at top, "TRAILER" at bottom	123-456	1 to approximately 125-000, 150-001 to 205-000	Revalidated for 1976 with red on white stickers.
	Maine	Trailer	Embossed black serial on reflective white plate with border line; "MAINE 74" at top, "TRAILER" at bottom	123-456	125-001 to approximately 150-000	Revalidated for 1976 with red on white stickers.
	Maine	Trailer	Embossed black serial on reflective white plate with border line; "MAINE" at top left, "TRAILER" at bottom	123-456	205-001 to approximately 362-000	Revalidated for 1976 with red on white stickers.
	Maryland	Temporary	Black lettering on white background with no slogan; machine-printed serial with relevant dates and vehicular information hand-written.	A12345		

== See also ==
- Antique vehicle registration
- Electronic license plate
- Motor vehicle registration
- Vehicle license
