= Vehicle registration plates of North Dakota =

North Dakota vehicle license plates

North Dakota
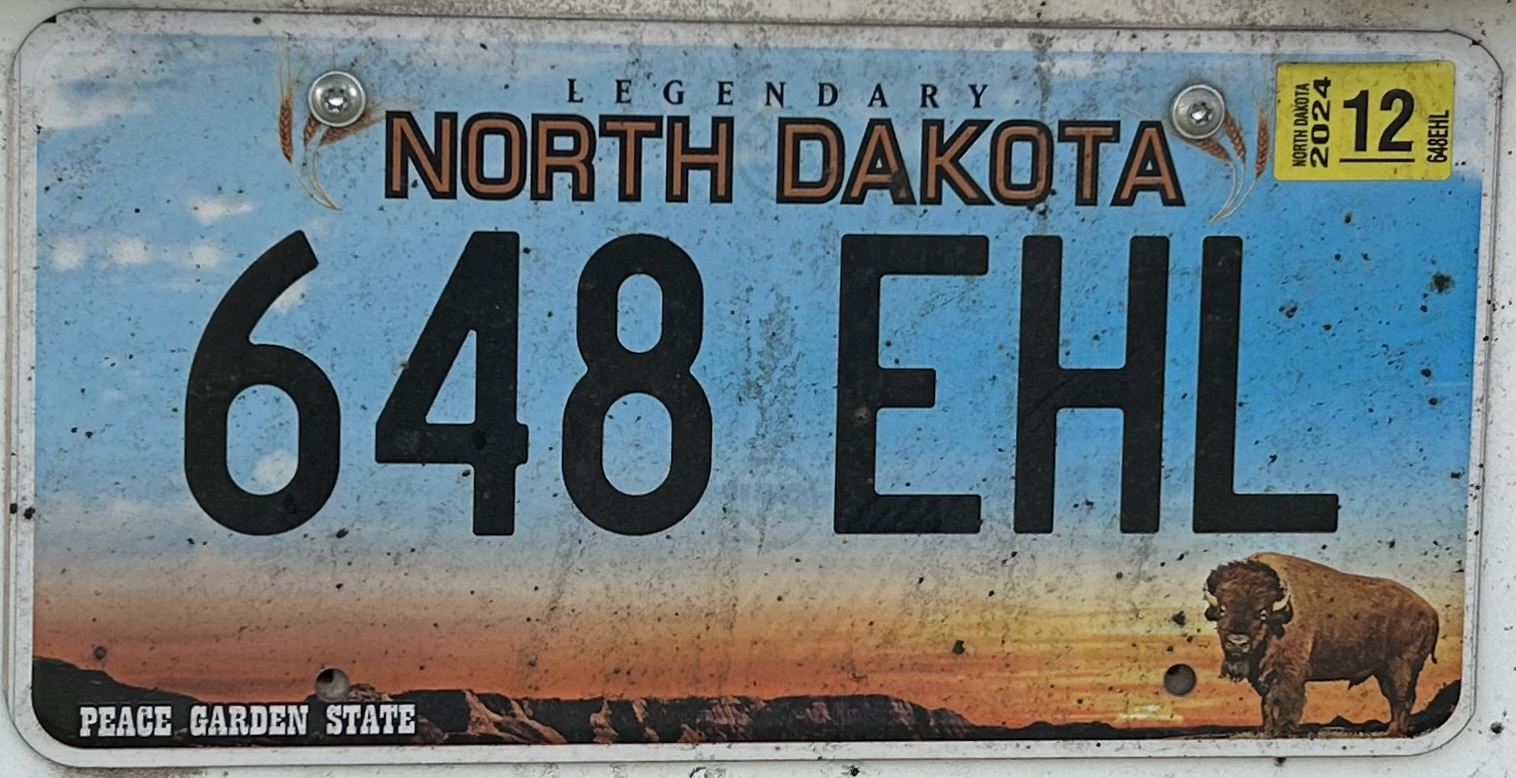
- "Legendary" plate with revised font for the state name

Current series
- Name: Legendary
- Slogan: Legendary North Dakota; Peace Garden State
- Size: 12 in × 6 in 30 cm × 15 cm
- Material: Aluminum
- Serial format: 123 ABC
- Introduced: November 12, 2015 (minor redesign November 2016)

Availability
- Issued by: North Dakota Department of Transportation, Motor Vehicle Division

History
- First issued: 1911

The U.S. state of North Dakota first required its residents to register their motor vehicles and display license plates in 1911. As of 2026, plates are issued by the North Dakota Department of Transportation through its Motor Vehicle Division. Front and rear plates are required for most classes of vehicles, while only rear plates are required for motorcycles and trailers.

== Passenger baseplates ==
=== 1911 to 1957 ===
In 1956, the United States, Canada, and Mexico came to an agreement with the American Association of Motor Vehicle Administrators, the Automobile Manufacturers Association and the National Safety Council that standardized the size for license plates for vehicles (except those for motorcycles) at 6 inches (15 cm) in height by 12 inches (30 cm) in width, with standardized mounting holes. The 1955 (dated 1956) issue was the first North Dakota license plate that complied with these standards.

Image	Dates issued	Design	Slogan	Serial format	Serials issued	Notes
	1911	Golden yellow serial on black flat metal plate; vertical "ND" and "1911" at left and right respectively	none	1234	1 to approximately 7000	
	1912	Embossed red serial on white plate; vertical "ND" and "1912" at left and right respectively	none	1234	1 to approximately 9000	
	1913	Embossed black serial on tan plate; vertical "ND" and "1913" at left and right respectively	none	12345	1 to approximately 12500	
	1914	Embossed black serial on yellow plate; vertical "ND" and "1914" at left and right respectively	none	12345	1 to approximately 17000	
	1915	Embossed black serial on green plate; vertical "ND" and "1915" at left and right respectively	none	12345	1 to approximately 25000	
	1916	Debossed yellow serial on black plate with border line; vertical "ND" and "1916" at left and right respectively	none	12345	1 to approximately 41000	
	1917	Debossed black serial on white plate with border line; vertical "ND" and "1917" at left and right respectively	none	12-345	1 to approximately 50-000	
	1917	As above, but embossed rather than debossed, and without border line	none	12345	50001 to approximately 63000	
	1918	Debossed red serial on white plate with border line; vertical "ND" and "1918" at left and right respectively	none	12345	1 to approximately 72000	
	1919	Debossed light green serial on black plate with border line; vertical "ND" and "1919" at left and right respectively	none	12345	1 to approximately 85000	
	1920	Embossed cream serial on green plate with border line; vertical "ND" and "1920" at left and right respectively	none	12345	1 to approximately 91000	
	1921	Embossed white serial on dark blue plate with border line; vertical "ND" and "1921" at left and right respectively	none	12345	1 to approximately 92000	
	1922	Embossed black serial on golden yellow plate with border line; vertical "ND" and "1922" at left and right respectively	none	12-345	1 to approximately 99-000	
	1923	Embossed white serial on green plate with border line; vertical "ND" and "1923" at left and right respectively	none	123-456	1 to approximately 110-000	
	1924	Embossed black serial on silver plate with border line; vertical "ND" and "1924" at left and right respectively	none	123-456	1 to approximately 116-000	
	1925	Embossed silver serial on black plate with border line; vertical "ND" and "1925" at left and right respectively	none	F12-345	F1 to approximately F82-000	Issued on Fords.
	1925	Embossed silver serial on black plate with border line; vertical "ND" and "1925" at left and right respectively	none	12-345	1 to approximately 51-000	Issued on all other vehicles.
	1926	Embossed red serial on gray plate with border line; vertical "ND" and "1926" at left and right respectively	none	F12-345	F1 to approximately F85-000	Issued on Fords.
	1926	Embossed red serial on gray plate with border line; vertical "ND" and "1926" at left and right respectively	none	12-345	1 to approximately 56-000	Issued on all other vehicles.
	1927	Embossed black serial on orange plate with border line; vertical "ND" and "1927" at left and right respectively	none	123-456	1 to approximately 140-000	
	1928	Embossed white serial on black plate with border line; vertical "ND" and "1928" at left and right respectively	none	123-456	1 to approximately 151-000	
	1929	Embossed black serial on silver plate with border line; vertical "ND" and "1929" at left and right respectively	none	123-456	1 to approximately 162-000	
	1930	Embossed green serial on golden yellow plate with border line; vertical "ND" and "1930" at left and right respectively	none	123-456	1 to approximately 155-000	
	1931	Embossed tan serial on dark blue plate with border line; vertical "ND" and "1931" at left and right respectively	none	123-456	1 to approximately 145-000	
	1932	Embossed white serial on maroon plate with border line; vertical "ND" and "1932" at left and right respectively	none	123-456	1 to approximately 125-000	
	1933	Embossed white serial on green plate with border line; vertical "ND" and "1933" at left and right respectively	none	123-456	1 to approximately 149-000	
	1934	Embossed blue serial on orange plate with border line; vertical "ND" and "1934" at left and right respectively	none	123-456	1 to approximately 155-000	
	1935	Embossed orange serial on black plate with border line; vertical "ND" and "1935" at left and right respectively	none	123-456	1 to approximately 135-000	
	1936	Embossed black serial on orange plate with border line; vertical "ND" and "1936" at left and right respectively	none	123-456	1 to approximately 140-000	
	1937	Embossed green serial on white plate with border line; vertical "ND" and "1937" at left and right respectively	none	123-456	1 to approximately 140-000	
	1938	Embossed black serial on yellow plate with border line; vertical "ND" and "1938" at left and right respectively	none	123-456	1 to approximately 141-000	
	1939	Embossed red serial on white plate with border line; vertical "ND" and "1939" at left and right respectively	none	123-456	1 to approximately 142-000	
	1940	Embossed yellow serial on black plate with border line; vertical "ND" and "1940" at left and right respectively	none	123-456	1 to approximately 147-000	
	1941	Embossed black serial on yellow plate with border line; vertical "ND" and "1941" at left and right respectively	none	123-456	1 to approximately 150-000	
	1942	Embossed yellow serial on red plate with border line; vertical "ND" and "1942" at left and right respectively	none	123-456	1 to approximately 143-000	Revalidated for 1943 with windshield stickers, due to metal conservation for World War II.
	1943	As 1942 base, but with vertical "1943" at right	none	123-456	200-001 to approximately 213-000	Issued only to new registrants.
	1944	Embossed yellow serial on black plate with border line; vertical "ND" and "1944" at left and right respectively	none	123-456	1 to approximately 135-000	
	1945	Embossed white serial on black plate with border line; vertical "ND" and "1945" at left and right respectively	none	123-456	1 to approximately 130-000	
	1946	Embossed red serial on silver plate with border line; vertical "ND" and "1946" at left and right respectively	none	123-456	1 to approximately 140-000	
	1947	Embossed black serial on yellow plate with border line; vertical "ND" and "1947" at left and right respectively	none	123-456	1 to approximately 152-000	
	1948	Embossed black serial on yellow plate with border line; "NORTH DAKOTA" centered at top; vertical "1948" at right	none	123-456	1 to approximately 162-000	First use of the full state name. Revalidated for 1949 with white tabs.
	1949	As 1948 base, but waffle-textured, and with vertical "1949" at right	none	123-456	200-001 to approximately 237-000	Issued only to new registrants.
	1950	Embossed black serial on orange plate with border line; "NORTH DAKOTA" centered at top; vertical "1950" at right	none	123-456	1 to approximately 194-000	
	1951	Embossed white serial on black plate with border line; "NORTH DAKOTA" centered at top; vertical "1951" at right	none	123-456	1 to approximately 196-000	
	1952	Embossed black serial on white plate with border line; "NORTH DAKOTA" centered at top; vertical "1952" at right	none	123-456	1 to approximately 192-000	
	1953	Embossed white serial on green plate with border line; "NORTH DAKOTA" centered at top; vertical "1953" at right	none	123-456	1 to approximately 198-000	
	1954	Embossed white serial on black plate with border line; "NORTH DAKOTA 54" at top	none	123-456	1 to approximately 201-000	
	1955	Embossed yellow serial on black plate with border line; "NORTH DAKOTA 55" at top	none	123-456	1 to approximately 209-000	
	1956	Embossed blue serial on white plate with border line; "NORTH DAKOTA 56" at top	"PEACE GARDEN STATE" at bottom	123-456	1 to approximately 208-000	First 6" x 12" plate, and first use of the "Peace Garden State" slogan.
	1957	Embossed white serial on blue plate with border line; "NORTH DAKOTA 57" at top	"PEACE GARDEN STATE" at bottom	123-456	1 to approximately 213-000	

=== 1958 to present ===
Image	Dates issued	Design	Slogan	Serial format	Serials issued	Notes
	1958–61	Embossed green serial on reflective white plate with border line; "NORTH DAKOTA 58" at top	"PEACE GARDEN STATE" at bottom	123-456	1 to approximately 316-000	Revalidated for 1959 with yellow tabs, for 1960 with orange tabs, and for 1961 with green tabs.
	1962–65	Embossed black serial on reflective white plate with border line; "N.DAKOTA" at top left and "62" at top right	"PEACE GARDEN STATE" at bottom	123-456	1 to approximately 355-000	Revalidated for 1963, 1964 and 1965 with stickers.
	1966–69	Embossed red serial on reflective white plate with border line; "N.DAKOTA" at top left and "66" at top right	"PEACE GARDEN STATE" at bottom	123-456	1 to approximately 378-000	Revalidated for 1967, 1968 and 1969 with stickers.
	1970–73	Embossed blue serial on reflective white plate with border line; "N.DAKOTA" at top left and "70" at top right	"PEACE GARDEN STATE" at bottom	123-456	1 to approximately 416-000	
	1974–79	Embossed green serial on reflective white plate with border line; "N.DAKOTA" at top left and "74" at top right	"PEACE GARDEN STATE" at bottom	123-456	1 to approximately 580-000	
	1980–82	Embossed black serial on reflective white plate with border line; "NORTH DAKOTA" centered at top; "80" at top right	"PEACE GARDEN STATE" at bottom	ABC 123	AAA 000 to AVP 999	Manufactured in Iowa using that state's serial dies. Issued concurrently with the Theodore Roosevelt base (below) from 1984.
	1983–88	As above, but without "80"	"PEACE GARDEN STATE" at bottom	ABC 123	AVR 000 to approximately AZM 999	Manufactured in Iowa using that state's serial dies. Issued concurrently with the Theodore Roosevelt base (below) from 1984.
	1984–88	Embossed blue serial on reflective white plate; blue, white and red graphic featuring Theodore Roosevelt screened at left; "NORTH DAKOTA" screened in blue centered at bottom	"PEACE GARDEN STATE" screened in red centered at top	AB123	AA000 to approximately KS999	Manufactured in South Dakota using that state's serial dies. Awarded "Plate of the Year" for best new license plate of 1985 by the Automobile License Plate Collectors Association, the first time North Dakota was so honored. Co-recipient with Nevada.
	1989–92	Embossed black serial on light blue, white and light orange gradient plate; long black bar screened below serial containing "1889 NORTH DAKOTA 1989" in white	Short black bar screened above serial containing "CENTENNIAL" in white; "PEACE GARDEN STATE" screened in black centered at top	ABC 123	BAA 000 to approximately CNP 999	Commemorated North Dakota's 100 years of statehood.
	1993 – November 11, 2015	Embossed black serial on prairie scene with gradient light blue sky, grey mountains and yellow grass; bison at bottom left and three wheat stalks at bottom right; "NORTH DAKOTA" screened in white with heavy black outline, centered below serial	"Discover the Spirit" screened in white centered at top; "PEACE GARDEN STATE" screened in brown centered at bottom	ABC 123	DAA 000 to approximately KRZ 999	Awarded "Plate of the Year" for best new license plate of 1993 by the Automobile License Plate Collectors Association, the second time North Dakota was so honored. 'F' series of serials reserved for Farm plates; 'I' series not used.
	November 12, 2015 – November 2016	Screened black serial on badlands scene with light blue, orange and yellow gradient sky, yellow rising sun and brown canyon; bison at bottom right; "NORTH DAKOTA" screened in orange centered above serial, with three wheat stalks on either side	"LEGENDARY" screened in black centered above state name; "PEACE GARDEN STATE" screened in white at bottom left	123 ABC	000 AAA to 999 BTX	First general reissue since 1993.
	November 2016 – present	As above, but with state name in larger, non-serif font	"LEGENDARY" screened in black centered above state name; "PEACE GARDEN STATE" screened in white at bottom left	123 ABC	000 BTY to 402 EXB (as of April 6, 2025)	First general reissue since 1993.

== Non-passenger plates ==
Image	Type	Dates issued	Design	Serial format	Serials issued	Notes
	Motorcycle	1988–94	Embossed black serial on beige plate; "ND" at top left, "88" at top right and "MOTORCYCLE" at bottom	L12345	L1 to approximately L35000	
	Motorcycle	1994–2010	Embossed black serial on light blue plate; "ND" at top left and "MOTORCYCLE" at bottom	M12345	M1 to approximately M93000	
	Motorcycle	2010–15	Embossed black serial on graphic plate similar to "Discover the Spirit" passenger base; "ND" screened at top left and "MOTORCYCLE" at bottom	M12345	M93001 to M99999	
	Motorcycle	2010–15	Embossed black serial on graphic plate similar to "Discover the Spirit" passenger base; "ND" screened at top left and "MOTORCYCLE" at bottom	12345M	1M to approximately 40000M	
	Motorcycle	2015–present	Similar to "Legendary" passenger base; "MOTORCYCLE" screened at bottom	12345M	50001M to present	
	Trailer	1993–2015	As "Discover the Spirit" passenger base	T123456	T1 to approximately T380000	
	Trailer	2015–present	As "Legendary" passenger base	T123456	T400001 to present	
