= Vehicle registration plates of Missouri =

Missouri vehicle license plates

Missouri
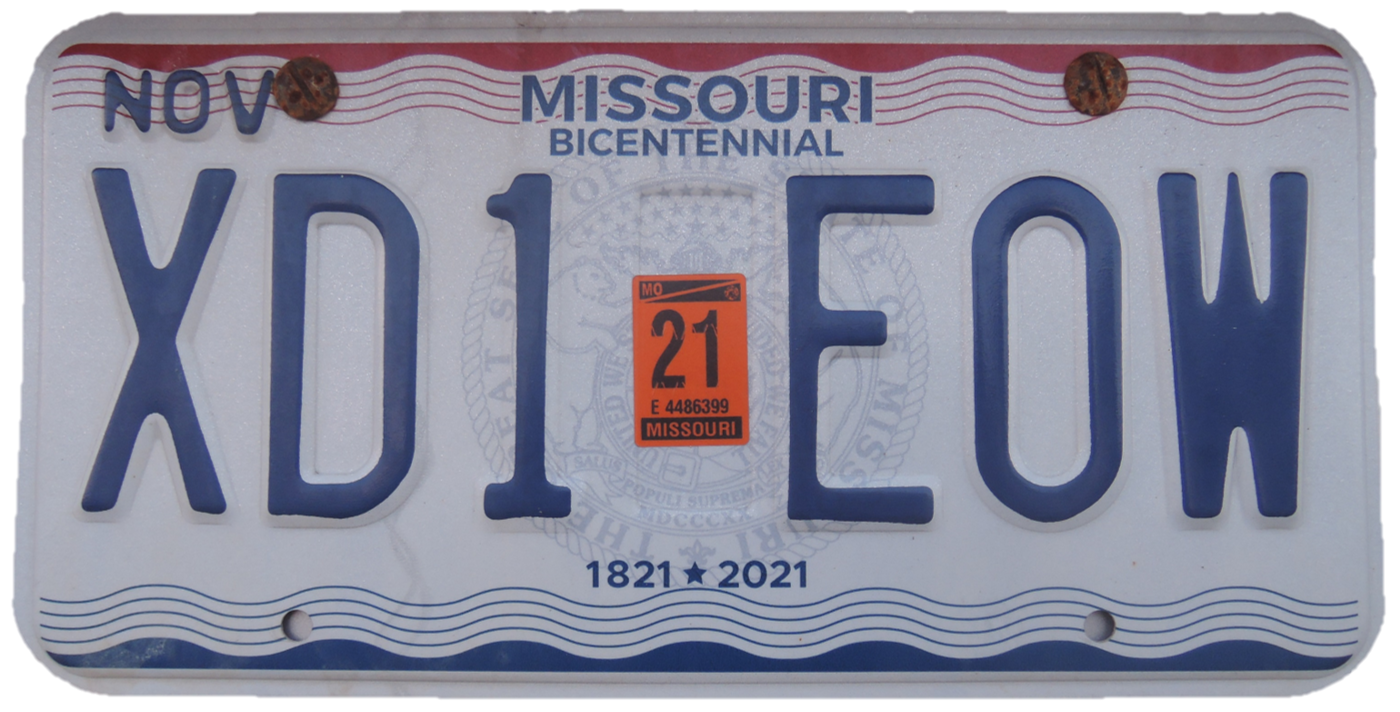

Current series
- Slogan: Show-Me State
- Size: 12 in × 6 in 30 cm × 15 cm
- Material: Aluminum
- Serial format: AB1 C2D (month-coded)
- Introduced: October 15, 2018 (revised 2024)

Availability
- Issued by: Missouri Department of Revenue

History
- First issued: March 9, 1911 (pre-state plates from 1907 through March 8, 1911)

The U.S. state of Missouri first required its residents to register their motor vehicles in 1907. Registrants provided their own license plates for display until 1911, when the state began to issue plates.

As of 2026, plates are manufactured at the Jefferson City Correctional Center and are issued by the Missouri Department of Revenue. Front and rear plates are required for most classes of vehicles, while only rear plates are required for motorcycles and trailers, and only front plates are required for trucks licensed in excess of twelve thousand pounds.

== Passenger baseplates ==
=== 1911 to 1948 ===
| Image | Dates issued | Description | Serial format | Serials issued | Notes |
|---|---|---|---|---|---|
| | 1911 | Embossed unpainted aluminum serial on yellow plate; "MISSOURI 1911" at bottom | 12345 | 1 to approximately 16500 | |
| | 1912 | Embossed white serial on red plate; "MO 12" at right | 12345 | 1 to approximately 24500 | |
| | 1913 | Embossed white serial on dark blue plate; "MO 13" at right | 12345 | 1 to approximately 36000 | |
| | 1914 | Embossed black serial on white plate; "MO 14" at right | 12345 | 1 to approximately 51000 | |
| | 1915 | Embossed black serial on bright green plate; "MO 15" at right | 12345 | 1 to approximately 73000 | |
| | 1916 | Embossed white serial on black plate; "MO 16" at right | 123456 | 1 to approximately 103000 | |
| | 1917 | Embossed black serial on gold plate; "MO 17" at right | 123456 | 1 to approximately 151000 | |
| | 1918 | Embossed blue serial on white plate; "MO 18" at right | 123456 | 1 to approximately 185000 | |
| | 1919 | Embossed white serial on dark blue plate with border line; "MO 19" at right | 123456 | 1 to approximately 243000 | |
| | 1920 | Embossed black serial on light green plate with border line; "MO. 1920" centered at bottom | 123-456 | 1 to approximately 309-000 | |
| | 1921 | Embossed red serial on white plate with border line; "MO. 1921" centered at bottom | 123-456 | 1 to approximately 350-000 | |
| | 1922 | Embossed white serial on brown plate with border line; "MO. 1922" centered at bottom | 123-456 | 1 to approximately 355-000 | |
| | 1923 | Embossed light blue serial on black plate with border line; "MO. 1923" centered at bottom | 123-456 | 1 to approximately 431-000 | |
| | 1924 | Embossed black serial on orange plate with border line; "MO. 1924" centered at bottom | 123-456 | 1 to approximately 495-000 | |
| | 1925 | Embossed white serial on dark green plate with border line; "MO. 1925" centered at bottom | 123-456 | 1 to approximately 550-000 | |
| | 1926 | Embossed black serial on yellow plate with border line; "MO. 1926" centered at bottom | 123-456 | 1 to approximately 595-000 | |
| | 1927 | Embossed white serial on dark blue plate with border line; "MO. 1927" centered at bottom | 123-456 | 1 to approximately 606-000 | |
| | 1928 | Embossed purple serial on orange plate with border line; "MO. 1928" centered at bottom | 123-456 | 1 to approximately 631-000 | |
| | 1929 | Embossed white serial on black plate with border line; "MO. 1929" centered at bottom | 123-456 | 1 to approximately 662-000 | |
| | 1930 | Embossed white serial on brown plate with border line; "MISSOURI 1930" at bottom | 123-456 | 1 to approximately 699-000 | |
| | 1931 | Embossed black serial on gray plate with border line; "1931 MISSOURI" at bottom | 123-456 | 1 to approximately 659-000 | |
| | 1932 | Embossed white serial on black plate with border line; "MISSOURI 1932" at bottom | 123-456 | 1 to approximately 657-000 | |
| | 1933 | Embossed beige serial on brown plate with border line; "1933 MISSOURI" at bottom | 123-456 | 1 to approximately 598-000 | |
| | 1934 | Embossed white serial on black plate with border line; "MO–1934" centered at bottom | 123-456 | 1 to approximately 627-000 | |
| | 1935 | Embossed white serial on dark green plate with border line; "MO–1935" centered at top | 123-456 | 1 to approximately 655-000 | |
| | 1936 | Embossed black serial on white plate with border line; "MISSOURI-1936" at bottom | 123-456 | 1 to approximately 678-000 | |
| | 1937 | Embossed white serial on black plate with border line; "19 MISSOURI 37" at top | 123-456 | 1 to approximately 697-000 | |
| | 1938 | Embossed black serial on buff plate with border line; "19 MISSOURI 38" at bottom | 123-456 | 1 to approximately 715-000 | |
| | 1939 | Embossed buff serial on black plate with border line; "MISSOURI-1939" at top | 123-456 | 1 to approximately 731-000 | |
| | 1940 | Embossed black serial on white plate with border line; "MISSOURI-1940" at bottom | 123-456 | 1 to approximately 767-000 | |
| | 1941 | Embossed white serial on black plate with border line; "MISSOURI-1941" at top | 123-456 | 1 to approximately 821-000 | |
| | 1942–43 | Embossed black serial on white plate with border line; "MISSOURI-1942" at bottom | 123-456 | 1 to approximately 820-000 | Embossed plates revalidated for 1943 with green tabs due to metal conservation for World War II; fiberboard plates manufactured for the same reason. |
| | 1942–43 | Black serial on white fiberboard plate; "MISSOURI-1942" centered at bottom | 123-456 | 820-001 to approximately 865-000 | Embossed plates revalidated for 1943 with green tabs due to metal conservation for World War II; fiberboard plates manufactured for the same reason. |
| | 1944 | Embossed yellow serial on black plate with border line; "MISSOURI-1944" at top | 123-456 | 1 to approximately 696-000 | |
| | 1945 | Embossed black serial on buff plate with border line; "MISSOURI-1945" at bottom | 123-456 | 1 to approximately 697-000 | |
| | 1946 | Embossed white serial on black plate with border line; "1946-MISSOURI" at bottom | 123-456 | 1 to approximately 774-000 | |
| | 1947 | Embossed black serial on white plate with border line; "MISSOURI-1947" at top | 123-456 | 1 to approximately 828-000 | |
| | 1948 | Embossed white serial on maroon plate with border line; "MISSOURI-1948" at bottom | 123-456 | 1 to approximately 871-000 | |

=== 1949 to 1966 ===
In 1956, the United States, Canada, and Mexico came to an agreement with the American Association of Motor Vehicle Administrators, the Automobile Manufacturers Association and the National Safety Council that standardized the size for license plates for vehicles (except those for motorcycles) at 6 inches (15 cm) in height by 12 inches (30 cm) in width, with standardized mounting holes. The 1955 (dated 1956) issue was the first Missouri license plate that complied with these standards.

| Image | Dates issued | Description | Serial format | Serials issued | Notes |
|---|---|---|---|---|---|
| | 1949–54 | Embossed white serial on maroon plate with border line; "MISSOURI" centered at top; month of expiration at top left | 123-456 | 1 to 905-000 | Monthly staggered registration introduced. All plates validated for 1949 with orange tabs, for 1950 with green tabs, for 1951 with white tabs, and for 1952 with black tabs. Plates expiring between January and August were validated for 1953 with maroon tabs, while those expiring between September and December were validated for that year with stickers. All plates were then validated for 1954 and 1955 with stickers. |
| | 1949–54 | Embossed white serial on maroon plate with border line; "MISSOURI" centered at top; month of expiration at top left | A12-345 | Letter corresponds to month of expiration | Monthly staggered registration introduced. All plates validated for 1949 with orange tabs, for 1950 with green tabs, for 1951 with white tabs, and for 1952 with black tabs. Plates expiring between January and August were validated for 1953 with maroon tabs, while those expiring between September and December were validated for that year with stickers. All plates were then validated for 1954 and 1955 with stickers. |
| | 1955–60 | Embossed yellow serial on black plate with border line; month of expiration at top left and "MO" at top right | 123-456 | 1 to 999-999 | Validated with stickers each year until 1961 expiration. |
| | 1955–60 | Embossed yellow serial on black plate with border line; month of expiration at top left and "MO" at top right | A12-345; AB1-234 | First letter corresponds to month of expiration | Validated with stickers each year until 1961 expiration. |
| | 1961–66 | Embossed white serial on maroon plate with border line; "MISSOURI" centered at top; month of expiration at top left and white box at top right containing debossed "62" | AB1-234 | First letter corresponds to month of expiration | Valid without stickers until 1962 expiration, then revalidated with stickers each year until 1967 expiration. |

=== 1967 to 1978 ===
| Image | Dates issued | Description | Slogan | Serial format | Serials issued | Notes |
|---|---|---|---|---|---|---|
| | 1967 | Embossed white serial on green plate with border line; month of expiration, "MISSOURI" and "68" at bottom | none | AB1-234 | First letter corresponds to month of expiration | |
| | 1968 | Embossed green serial on white plate with border line; "69", "MISSOURI" and month of expiration at top | none | AB1-234 | First letter corresponds to month of expiration | |
| | 1969 | Embossed black serial on white plate with border line; month of expiration, "MISSOURI" and "70" at bottom | none | A1B-234 | First letter corresponds to month of expiration | |
| | 1970 | Embossed white serial on maroon plate with border line; month of expiration, "MISSOURI" and "71" at top | none | AB1-234 | First letter corresponds to month of expiration | |
| | 1971 | Embossed blue serial on reflective white plate with border line; month of expiration, "MISSOURI" and "72" at top | none | A1B-234 | First letter corresponds to month of expiration | |
| | 1972 | Embossed maroon serial on reflective white plate with border line; month of expiration, "MISSOURI" and "73" at bottom | none | AB1-234 | First letter corresponds to month of expiration | |
| | 1973 | Embossed black serial on reflective white plate with border line; "74", "MISSOURI" and month of expiration at top | none | A1B-234 | First letter corresponds to month of expiration | |
| | 1974 | Embossed blue serial on reflective white plate with border line; "75", "MISSOURI" and month of expiration at bottom | none | AB1-234 | First letter corresponds to month of expiration | |
| | 1975 | Embossed reflective (glass-beaded) yellow serial on blue plate with border line; month of expiration, "MISSOURI" and "76" at top | none | A1B-234 | First letter corresponds to month of expiration | |
| | 1976 | Embossed reflective (glass-beaded) white serial on red plate with border line; embossed white stylized "76" and flag stripes centered at top; "MO" at top left and "77" and month of expiration at top right | "200 YRS" at top left, below state abbreviation | AB1-234 | First letter corresponds to month of expiration | |
| | 1977 | Embossed reflective (glass-beaded) yellow serial on black plate with border line; "78", "MISSOURI" and month of expiration at top | none | A1B-234 | First letter corresponds to month of expiration | |
| | 1978 | Embossed reflective (glass-beaded) white serial on blue plate with border line; month of expiration, "MISSOURI" and "79" at bottom | none | AB1-234 | First letter corresponds to month of expiration | |

=== 1979 to present ===
| Image | Dates issued | Description | Slogan | Serial format | Serials issued | Notes |
|---|---|---|---|---|---|---|
| | 1979–96 | Embossed reflective (glass-beaded) white serial on maroon plate with border line; "MISSOURI" centered at top; month of expiration at top left | "SHOW-ME STATE" centered at bottom | ABC 123 | First letter corresponds to month of expiration | |
| | 1986–96 | Embossed reflective (glass-beaded) white serial on maroon plate with border line; "MISSOURI" centered at top; month of expiration at top left | "SHOW-ME STATE" centered at bottom | A1B 234 | First letter corresponds to month of expiration | |
| | 1995–96 | Embossed reflective (glass-beaded) white serial on maroon plate with border line; "MISSOURI" centered at top; month of expiration at top left | "SHOW-ME STATE" centered at bottom | 1A2 34B | First letter corresponds to month of expiration | |
| | 1997 – early 2006 | Embossed dark blue serial on reflective white, blue and green gradient plate; "MISSOURI" screened in green, with wavy dark blue underline, centered at top | "SHOW-ME STATE" screened in dark blue centered at bottom | 123 ABC | 001 AAA to 999 ZZZ | Letters I, O, Q, U and V not used in serials, and D used only as the first letter. |
| | early 2006 – June 15, 2008 | Embossed dark blue serial on reflective white, blue and green gradient plate; "MISSOURI" screened in green, with wavy dark blue underline, centered at top | "SHOW-ME STATE" screened in dark blue centered at bottom | 1AB 23C | 0AA 01A to approximately 9DG 99G | Letters I, O, Q, U and V not used in serials, and D used only as the first letter. |
| | June 16, 2008 – October 14, 2018 | Embossed dark blue on reflective light blue gradient fade with bluebird graphic | Show Me State | AB1 C2D | First letter corresponds to month of expiration | Letters I, O and Q not used in serials. |
| | October 15, 2018 – November 2024 | Embossed dark blue on reflective white with red waves at top, blue waves at bottom and state seal in center | "BICENTENNIAL" centered at top; "1821 * 2021" centered at bottom | AB1 C2D | First letter corresponds to month of expiration | |
| | November 2024 – present | Embossed dark blue on reflective white with red waves at top, blue waves at bottom and state seal in center | "SHOW-ME STATE" centered at top | AB1 C2D | First letter corresponds to month of expiration | |

== Month coding ==
Missouri implemented a monthly staggered registration system in 1949, when it introduced its first multi-year passenger plate. At first, serials were in an all-numeric format, with a block allocated to each month. When these were exhausted, a new format was introduced, featuring a one-letter prefix corresponding to the month. When new multi-year plates were introduced in 1955, the same all-numeric and one-letter serial formats were used, with some months then exhausting their one-letter serials and introducing a two-letter format (the first letter still corresponding to the month).

| Month | All-numeric serials, 1949–54 | All-numeric serials, 1955–60 | Letter code |
|---|---|---|---|
| January | 1 to 75-000 | 1 to 75-000 | A |
| February | 75-001 to 150-000 | 75-001 to 160-000 | B |
| March | 150-001 to 225-000 | 160-001 to 245-000 | C |
| April | 225-001 to 300-000 | 245-001 to 330-000 | E |
| May | 300-001 to 375-000 | 330-001 to 415-000 | H |
| June | 375-001 to 450-000 | 415-001 to 500-000 | K |
| July | 450-001 to 525-000 | 500-001 to 585-000 | M |
| August | 525-001 to 600-000 | 585-001 to 670-000 | P |
| September | 600-001 to 675-000 | 670-001 to 755-000 | S |
| October | 675-001 to 750-000 | 755-001 to 840-000 | X |
| November | 750-001 to 825-000 | 840-001 to 925-000 | Y |
| December | 825-001 to 905-000 | 925-001 to 999-999 | Z |

Two-letter serial formats were used exclusively from 1961 through 1978, including the twelve-year period in which Missouri reverted to the use of single-year plates (1967–78). An ABC 123 format was introduced in 1979 with the maroon "Show-Me State" plate, which was issued through 1996; months which exhausted their allocations subsequently used the A1B 234 and 1A2 34B formats.

Throughout this period, the first letter in the serial continued to correspond to the month. Increasing demand resulted in each of the months from April through September being assigned a second letter code in the mid-1960s. March and October were assigned second letters in the mid-1970s, and by the 1990s all twelve months were using two letters.

| Month | Original letter code | Second letter code |
|---|---|---|
| January | A | V |
| February | B | D |
| March | C | L |
| April | E | F |
| May | H | G |
| June | K | J |
| July | M | N |
| August | P | R |
| September | S | W |
| October | X | T |
| November | Y | U |
| December | Z | Q |

Month coding was discontinued with the introduction of the white, blue and green "Show-Me State" plate in 1997, before it was reintroduced in June 2008 with the introduction of the bluebird plate. Passenger plates used an AB1 C2D serial format, with the first letter corresponding to the month as from 1949 to 1996. This time, however, one letter was assigned for February, and two letters for each of the other eleven months, with the order of the letters strictly alphabetical. Hence, A and B were assigned for January, C for February, D and E for March, and so on up to Y and Z for December, with I, O and Q not used. This system was also used on light truck plates, which used a 1AB 234 serial format, the first letter corresponding to the month as on passenger plates.

When the Bicentennial plate was introduced in October 2018, passenger plates retained the AB1 C2D serial format, with each of the months that had been assigned two letters going over to its second letter (January going over from A to B, for instance), while February continued from where its serials on the bluebird plate had left off. Light truck plates continued to use the system but changed to a 1AB C23 serial format, the first letter corresponding to the month as before.

| Month | Codes |
|---|---|
| January | A, B |
| February | C |
| March | D, E |
| April | F, G |
| May | H, J |
| June | K, L |
| July | M, N |
| August | P, R |
| September | S, T |
| October | U, V |
| November | W, X |
| December | Y, Z |

== Yearly Tab Colors ==
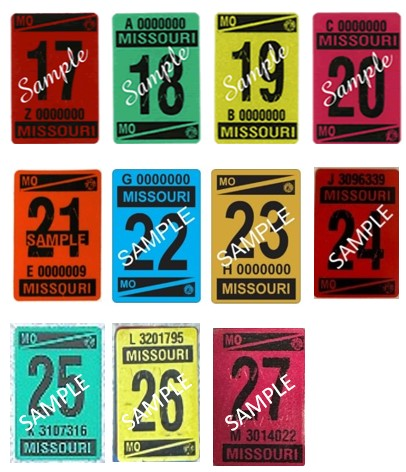

== Non-passenger plates ==
| Image | Type | Serial format | Notes |
|---|---|---|---|
| | Apportioned | 12A B3C | |
| | Bus | 123 45B | |
| | Commercial Trailer | 12A 345 | |
| | Dealer | D1-A; D1-AB; D12-A; D12-AB; D123-A; D123-AB; D1234-A; D1234-AB | Numerical portion of serial remains constant for each dealer; suffix letter ascends for each plate issued to that dealer. |
| | Disabled | AB 12C | All disabled plates expire in September. Serials probably started at GA 01A. |
| | Fleet Vehicle | varies | Issued to companies and organizations with more than ten vehicles. |
| | Local Government | varies | Variety of designs issued for vehicles belonging to local governments. |
| | Motorcycle | AB 1CD | All motorcycle plates expire in June. Serials probably started at GA 1AA. |
| | Official Vehicle | varies | Issued to statewide agencies. |
| | Trailer | 12A 3BC | |
| | Truck 6,000 lb. and less | 1AB C23 | First letter corresponds to month of expiration. |
| | Truck 6,001 to 12,000 lb. | 12A 3BC | |

== Previous non-passenger plates ==
=== 2008 base ===
| Image | Type | Design | Serial format | Serials issued | Notes |
|---|---|---|---|---|---|
| | Disabled | As passenger plate, but with "DISABLED" screened at bottom left | AB 12C | AA 01A to approximately EE 99Z | |
| | Motorcycle | Similar to passenger plate; "APR" screened at bottom left | AB 1CD | AA 1AA to approximately DY 9ZZ | |
| | Truck 6,000 lb. and less | As passenger plate | 1AB 234 | First letter corresponds to month of expiration | |

=== 1997 base ===
| Image | Type | Legend | Serial format | Serials issued | Notes |
|---|---|---|---|---|---|
| | Dealer | Dealer | D1-A; D1-AB; D12-A; D12-AB; D123-A; D123-AB; D1234-A; D1234-AB | | Annual plates. Numerical portion of serial remained constant for each dealer; suffix letter ascended for each plate issued to that dealer. |
| | Disabled Person | Disabled | Progression of serial formats unknown, but included: 1 ABC; 1 AB2 | | |
| | Disabled Person - Truck less than 6,000 lb. | Disabled | 1 A2B | | "BL6" embossed at top right. |
| | Motorcycle | none | A1 234 | A0 001 to Z9 999 | |
| | Motorcycle | none | 1A 234 | 0A 001 to approximately 5S 000 | |
| | Shuttle Bus | SHUTTLE BUS | 123 4SB | | |
| | Trailer | TRAILER | ABC 123 | | Annual plates. |
| | Trailer - Commercial | COMM TRL | 000 000 | | |
| | Trailer - HRC | HRC TLR | 000 000 | | |
| | Trailer - Permanent | PERM TRL | PA1 234 | | |
| | Truck 6,000 lb. and less | SHOW-ME STATE | 123 AB4 | 000 AC1 to approximately 600 XR0 | "BL6" screened at top right. C, E, F, G, H, J, K, L, M, N, P, R and S used as second letter in serial. |
| | Truck 6,001 to 12,000 lb. | SHOW-ME STATE | 123 AB4 | 000 AT1 to approximately 400 XT0 | "BL12" screened at top right. T, W, X, Y and Z used as second letter in serial. |
| | U.S. Senate | Member of Congress | USS-1 | | Black on gold. Number indicates state's senior or junior senator. |

== Optional types ==
Optional types on this base continue to be issued, likely until January 2009. Most, if not all, optional types on this base were available in personalized format and with certain non-passenger designations. Where applicable, this designation was printed in a small rectangle screened in the upper right corner of the plate.

| Image | Type | Slogan | Serial format | Serials issued | Notes |
|---|---|---|---|---|---|
| | Back the Blue | | | | |
| | Be an Organ Donor | | | | |
| | Breast Cancer Awareness | | | | |
| | Conservation | | | | |
| | Don't Tread on Me | | | | |
| | Fight Terrorism | | | | |
| | God Bless America | | | | |
| | Helping Schools | | | | |
| | Missouri Remembers | | | | |
| | Purple Heart | | | | |
| | St. Louis Cardinals | | | | |
| | Shriners | | | | |
| | Some Gave All | | | | |
| | Southwest Missouri State University | | | | |
