= Vehicle registration plates of Alaska =

Alaska vehicle license plates

Alaska
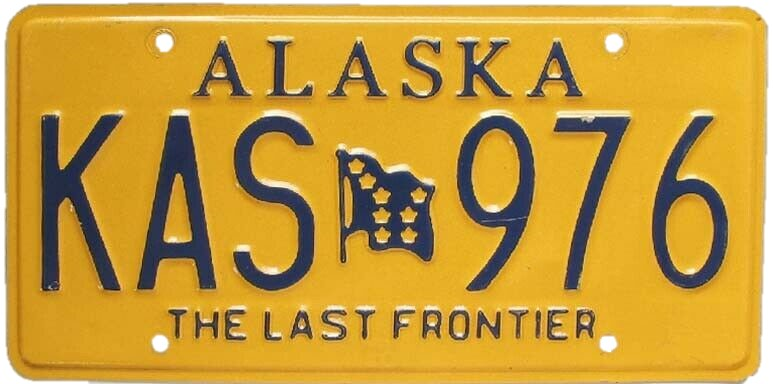
- Current Last Frontier license plate

Current series
- Slogan: Last Frontier plate: The Last Frontier; Bear plate: none Artistic License plate: Alaska Artistic License
- Size: 12 in × 6 in 30 cm × 15 cm
- Material: Aluminum
- Serial format: ABC 123
- Introduced: Last Frontier: July 2005 (issued continuously since January 1, 2010); Bear: May 2015; Artistic License: July 2018

Availability
- Issued by: Alaska Department of Administration, Division of Motor Vehicles
- Manufactured by: Irwin-Hodson Company, Portland, Oregon

History
- First issued: May 21, 1921

Alaska first required its residents to register their motor vehicles and display license plates in 1921, while still an organized incorporated territory of the United States. It was admitted to the Union as the 49th state in January 1959.

As of 2026, plates are issued by the Alaska Department of Administration through its Division of Motor Vehicles. Only rear plates have been required for standard passenger vehicles since August 11, 2022. On vehicles with two license plates, only the rear plate is required to be stickered.

== Passenger baseplates ==
=== 1921 to 1952 ===
No slogans were used on passenger plates during the period covered by this subsection.

Image	Dates issued	Design	Serial format	Serials issued	Notes
	1921	Embossed black serial on golden yellow plate with border line; "ALASKA" at top, "AUTO LICENSE" at bottom and vertical "1921" at left and right	123	1 to approximately 350	
	1922	Embossed orange serial on black plate with border line; "ALASKA" at top and "1922" at bottom right	123	1 to approximately 500	
	1923	Embossed white serial on dark blue plate with border line; "ALASKA" at top and "1923" at bottom right	123	1 to approximately 850	
	1924	Embossed black serial on orange plate with border line; "ALASKA" at top and "1924" at bottom right	123	1 to approximately 999	
	1925	Embossed white serial on red plate with border line; "ALASKA" at top and "1925" at bottom right	1234	0001 to approximately 1200	
	1926	Embossed black serial on green plate with border line; "ALASKA" at top and "1926" at bottom right	123	1 to approximately 999	
	1927	Embossed white serial on black plate with border line; "ALASKA" at top and "1927" at bottom right	1234	101 to approximately 1250	
	1928	Embossed red serial on light yellow plate with border line; "ALASKA" at top and "1928" at bottom right	1234	101 to approximately 1350	
	1929	Embossed white serial on maroon plate with border line; "ALASKA" at top and "1929" at bottom right	1234	101 to approximately 1600	
	1930	Embossed white serial on dark blue plate with border line; "ALASKA" at top and "1930" at bottom right	1234	101 to approximately 1800	
	1931	Embossed black serial on gray plate with border line; "ALASKA" at top and "1931" at bottom right	1234	1 to approximately 2000	
	1932	Embossed white serial on dark blue plate; "ALASKA – 1932" at bottom	1234	301 to approximately 3100	
	1933	Embossed white serial on red plate; "ALASKA – 1933" at bottom	1234	301 to approximately 3000	
	1934	Embossed white serial on green plate; "ALASKA – 1934" at bottom	1234	101 to approximately 3200	
	1935	Embossed black serial on orange plate; "ALASKA – 1935" at bottom	1234	101 to approximately 3100	
	1936	Embossed dark blue serial on white plate with border line; "ALASKA – 1936" at bottom	1234	1001 to approximately 4300	
	1937	Embossed white serial on dark blue plate with border line; "ALASKA – 1937" at bottom	1234	1001 to approximately 4300	
	1938	Embossed red serial on white plate; "ALASKA – 1938" at bottom	1234	1001 to approximately 5200	
	1939	Embossed black serial on silver plate; "ALASKA – 1939" at bottom	1234	1 to approximately 4800	
	1940	Embossed black serial on orange plate; "ALASKA – 1940" at bottom	1234	1 to approximately 5200	
	1941	Embossed white serial on green plate; "ALASKA – 1941" at bottom	1234	1 to 6000; 7001 to approximately 7900	Serials 6001 through 7000 reserved for vehicles for hire.
	1942	Embossed black serial on white plate; "ALASKA – 1942" at bottom	1234	1 to approximately 7900	
	1943–44	Embossed white serial on blue plate; "ALASKA – 1943" at bottom	1234	1 to approximately 7800	Revalidated for 1944 with black tabs, due to metal conservation for World War II.
	1945	White serial on green fiberboard plate; "ALASKA-1945" centered at bottom	1234	1 to approximately 7800	Fiberboard plates manufactured due to ongoing metal shortage; this continued until 1948.
	1946	White serial on maroon fiberboard plate; "ALASKA-1946" centered at top	1234	1 to approximately 8300	
	1947	Yellow serial on dark blue fiberboard plate; "ALASKA-1947" centered at bottom	1234	1 to approximately 11300	
	1948	Embossed blue serial on golden yellow plate; embossed territorial flag at left; "ALASKA — 1948" at bottom	12345	1 to approximately 15000	
	1949	Embossed blue serial on white plate; blue lines at top and bottom borders; embossed territorial flag at left; "ALASKA — 1949" at bottom	12345	1 to approximately 20000	
	1950	Embossed black serial on orange plate with border line; embossed territorial flag at left; "ALASKA — 1950" at bottom	12345	1 to approximately 26500	
	1951	Embossed blue serial on golden yellow plate with border line; embossed territorial flag at left; "ALASKA — 1951" at top	12345	1 to approximately 35000	
	1952	Embossed blue serial on white plate with border line; embossed territorial flag at left; "ALASKA — 1952" at top	12345	1 to approximately 35000	

=== 1953 to present ===
In 1956, the United States, Canada, and Mexico came to an agreement with the American Association of Motor Vehicle Administrators, the Automobile Manufacturers Association and the National Safety Council that standardized the size for license plates for vehicles (except those for motorcycles) at 6 inches (15 cm) in height by 12 inches (30 cm) in width, with standardized mounting holes. The 1955 (dated 1956) issue was the first Alaska license plate that complied with these standards.

All plates issued since 1981 remain valid with proper validation.

Image	Dates issued	Design	Slogan	Serial format	Serials issued	Notes
	1953–55	Embossed blue serial on golden yellow plate with border line; embossed territorial flag at left; "ALASKA" centered at top; "53" at top right	none	12345	1 to approximately 96000	Revalidated for 1954 with white tabs, and for 1955 with black tabs.
	1956–57	Embossed blue serial on white plate with border line; embossed territorial flag at left; "ALASKA" centered at top; "56" at top right	none	12345	1 to approximately 63000	First 6" x 12" plate. Revalidated for 1957 with red tabs.
	1958–59	Embossed blue serial on golden yellow plate with border line; embossed territorial/state flag at left; "ALASKA" centered at top; "58" at top right	none	12345	1 to approximately 74000	Revalidated for 1959 with white tabs.
	1960–61	Embossed blue serial on white plate with border line; embossed state flag at left; "ALASKA" centered at top; "60" at top right	none	12345	1 to approximately 93000	Revalidated for 1961 with blue tabs.
	1962–65	Embossed blue serial on white plate with border line; embossed state flag at left; "ALASKA" centered at bottom; "62" at bottom right	none	12345	1 to 99999	Revalidated for 1963 with blue tabs, and for 1964 and 1965 with stickers.
	1962–65	Embossed blue serial on white plate with border line; embossed state flag at left; "ALASKA" centered at bottom; "62" at bottom right	none	A-1234	A-1000 to approximately E-3250	Revalidated for 1963 with blue tabs, and for 1964 and 1965 with stickers.
	1966–67	Embossed yellow serial on blue plate with border line; embossed eagle totem pole graphic at left; stylized "ALASKA" centered at top; yellow box at top right containing debossed "66"	"NORTH TO THE FUTURE" centered at bottom, with "1867" to the left and "1967" to the right	12345	1 to 99999	Commemorated the centennial of the Alaska Purchase. Revalidated for 1967 with stickers.
	1968–69	Embossed blue serial on white plate with border line; embossed state flag at left; "ALASKA" centered at top; blue box at top right containing debossed "68"	"THE GREAT LAND" centered at bottom	12345	1 to 99999	Revalidated for 1969 with stickers.
	1968–69	Embossed blue serial on white plate with border line; embossed state flag at left; "ALASKA" centered at top; blue box at top right containing debossed "68"	"THE GREAT LAND" centered at bottom	B1234	B1000 to approximately B7250	Revalidated for 1969 with stickers.
	1970	Embossed blue serial on golden yellow plate with border line; embossed state flag at left; "ALASKA–U.S.A." centered at top; blue box at top right containing debossed "70"	"NORTH TO THE FUTURE" centered at bottom	12345	1 to 99999	All plates were valid without stickers until the end of the year of issue, then revalidated with stickers until the end of 1975.
	1970	Embossed blue serial on golden yellow plate with border line; embossed state flag at left; "ALASKA–U.S.A." centered at top; blue box at top right containing debossed "70"	"NORTH TO THE FUTURE" centered at bottom	A1234	A1 to approximately A5200	All plates were valid without stickers until the end of the year of issue, then revalidated with stickers until the end of 1975.
	1971	As above, but with additional blue box at top left containing debossed "71"	"NORTH TO THE FUTURE" centered at bottom	A1234	B1 to approximately E1100	All plates were valid without stickers until the end of the year of issue, then revalidated with stickers until the end of 1975.
	1972–73	As above, but with box at top right containing debossed "72" instead of "70"	"NORTH TO THE FUTURE" centered at bottom	A1234	G1 to G9999; K1 to approximately M9999	All plates were valid without stickers until the end of the year of issue, then revalidated with stickers until the end of 1975.
	(1973)	Embossed blue serial on golden yellow plate; border line around plate and around revalidation sticker spot at top left; embossed state flag in the center; "ALASKA" centered at top; "73" at top right	none	ABC 123	AAA 100 to AAD 999	Not issued; considered prototypes (see 1973 plate controversy section below).
	1974	As 1970–73 plates, but with "ALASKA" centered at top, border line around revalidation sticker spot at top left, and "74" at top right	"NORTH TO THE FUTURE" centered at bottom	AB 123	AA 100 to DB 699	Letter Q not used in this serial format.
	1975	As above, but with "75" at top right	"NORTH TO THE FUTURE" centered at bottom	AB 123	DB 700 to ED 999	Letter Q not used in this serial format.
	1976–81	Embossed red serial on reflective white plate; standing brown Kodiak bear screened in the center, with pale brown mountain and forest landscape in the background; "ALASKA" embossed in red centered at top	none	ABC 123	AAA 100 to ASZ 999	Letters I, O and Q not used in this serial format.
	1981–97	Embossed blue serial on reflective golden yellow plate; screened state flag in the center; "ALASKA" screened in blue centered at top; indented top corners for revalidation stickers	"The Last Frontier" screened in blue centered at bottom	ABC 123	BAA 100 to CZZ 999; DFA 100 to DJX 999	Series DAA through DEZ reserved for Disabled Veteran plates.
	1997 – October 2004	Embossed black serial on reflective graphic plate featuring a blue sky, yellow rising sun, white mountains fading to golden yellow at the bottom, and black silhouettes of gold prospectors from the top center to the bottom left; "ALASKA" screened in golden yellow centered at top, with mining equipment for the second 'A'	"Gold Rush" screened in golden yellow below state name and "Centennial" in black at bottom, both offset to right	ABC 123	DJY 100 to ERT 999	Awarded "Plate of the Year" for best new standard-issue license plate of 1998 by the Automobile License Plate Collectors Association, the first time Alaska was so honored. Co-recipient with Idaho.
	October 2004	As 1981–97 base, but without indented top corners	"The Last Frontier" as on 1981–97 base	ABC 123	ERU 100 to approximately ERV 489	Serials stamped on leftover 1981–97 blanks, before production of all-embossed variants began (below).
	October 2004 – July; 2005	As above, but with embossed state name and flag	"THE LAST FRONTIER" embossed in blue centered at bottom	ABC 123	ERV 490 to EUB 999	
	July 2005 – December 31, 2007	As above, but with larger stars in flag	"THE LAST FRONTIER" embossed in blue centered at bottom	ABC 123	EUC 100 to FGE 999	
	January 1, 2008 – December 31, 2009	Embossed dark blue serial on reflective graphic plate featuring a yellow sky, gradient orange sunburst and white mountains fading to blue at the bottom; Alaska 50 logo (featuring the state flag) screened at left; "ALASKA" screened in dark blue centered at top	"CELEBRATING STATEHOOD 1959-2009" screened in red on white section of mountains, offset to right	ABC123	FGF100 to FUW999	Also used for vanity plates.
	January 1, 2010 – December 2022	As 2005–07 base	"THE LAST FRONTIER" as from 2004 to 2007	ABC 123	FUZ 100 to FUZ 999; GAA 100 to GZZ 999; KAA 100 to KJX 999	FUZ series issued in error; 'H' series reserved for Disabled plates; 'J' series used on alternative bear plates (below). Plates from about KEU 100 onward feature thicker serial dies similar to those used in 1968–75.
	January 2023 – present	As above, but with thinner, squarer serial dies (using North Carolina dies), and only the plate number is embossed.	"THE LAST FRONTIER" as from 2004 to 2022	ABC 123	KJY 100 to KTC 363 (as of August 22, 2026)	Zeros became slashed; they are also seen on alternative passenger plates issued with the same serial dies.

=== Alternative passenger plates ===
Image	Dates issued	Design	Slogan	Serial format	Serials issued	Notes
	May 7, 2015 – March 2023	Embossed red serial on reflective graphic plate featuring a standing brown Kodiak bear in the center against a light blue sky, orange sunset and white mountains; "ALASKA" screened in dark blue centered at top	none	ABC 123	JAA 100 to JWS 999	Based on the 1976–81 bear plate. Awarded "Plate of the Year" for best new license plate of 2015 by the Automobile License Plate Collectors Association, the second time Alaska was so honored. Plates from about JPV 100 onward feature thicker serial dies similar to those used in 1968–75.
	March 2023 – present	As above, but with thinner, squarer characters	none	ABC 123	JWT 100 to JZZ 999; MAA 100 to MGN 878 (as of August 22, 2026)	
	July 2018 – mid 2019	Embossed black serial on reflective graphic plate with northern lights and full moon above pale gray mountains and dark gray forest; "ALASKA" screened in black centered at top	"ALASKA ARTISTIC LICENSE" screened in black centered at bottom, with the logo of the Alaska State Council on the Arts above	ABC 123	LAA 100 to approximately LBT 999	The design was by UAA student Anita Laulainen and was chosen after an online vote in the fall of 2017. Still valid for renewals.
	mid 2019 – March 2023	Embossed black serial on reflective graphic plate with northern lights and full moon above pale gray mountains and dark gray forest; "ALASKA" screened in black centered at top	"ALASKA ARTISTIC LICENSE" screened in black centered at bottom, with the logo of the Alaska State Council on the Arts above	ABC 123	LBU 100 to LJG 999	Colors faded in response to legibility concerns. Still valid for renewals.
	March 2023 – August 18, 2024	As above, but with thinner, squarer characters	"ALASKA ARTISTIC LICENSE" screened in black centered at bottom, with the logo of the Alaska State Council on the Arts above	ABC 123	LJH 100 to LMM 799	Still valid for renewals.
	August 19, 2024 - present	Embossed black serial on reflective graphic plate with fireweed and Denali under a purple sky; "ALASKA" screened in black centered at top	"ALASKA STATE COUNCIL ON THE ARTS" screened in white centered at bottom, with the logo of the Alaska State Council on the Arts above	ABC 123	LMS 100 to LUJ 513 (as of August 22, 2026)	Fireweed plate. The design was submitted by Sabrina Kessakorn and was chosen after an online vote using ranked choice voting in the summer of 2023.

== 1973 plate controversy ==
A new plate design was to have been introduced in 1973, featuring the state flag in the center of the plate and a new ABC 123 serial format. During 1972, nine thousand pairs of these plates were produced, but before they could be issued they were rejected by Governor William A. Egan, who objected to the use of dots rather than stars in the state flag. The plates were instead considered prototypes, with their elements being used on future plates: the revalidation sticker box in the top left corner was used on the 1974 and 1975 versions of the 1970 plate; the ABC 123 serial format was adopted in 1976; and the "Last Frontier" plates issued since 1981 have the state flag in the center (with stars).

These prototype plates are common enough to be easily found among license plate collectors.

== Non-passenger and optional types ==
Alaska offers a variety of optional plates that motorists may display upon the payment of an additional fee as well as non-passenger plate types that are displayed on vehicles for specialized uses.

Image	Type	First issued	Serial format	Notes
	Alaska State Trooper		123 AST	
	Amateur Radio		FCC call sign	
	Blood Bank of Alaska		Personalized	
	Charitable/Church Exempt		XYx 123; YYx 123	
	Children's Trust		KID 012; 123 KID	KID-prefixed sequence started with 001.
	Collector's Car		HA 123	
	Commercial Trailer		1234 SB	
	Disabled		HBC 123	Serials feature wheelchair symbol between letters and digits.
	Disabled Veteran		DBC 123	Serials began at DAV 100. May or may not feature wheelchair symbol between letters and digits.
	Ex-Prisoner of War		POW 012	Started with 001.
	Farm Vehicle		1234 FB	"Farm" legend.
	Gold Star Family		Personalized	
	Historic Vehicle		HA 123	
	Iditarod		IDT 123 or personalized	
	I Support Our Veterans	2007	Personalized	
	Low-Speed Vehicle	2007	LSV 012	Started with 001.
	Motorcycle and Non-Commercial Trailer	1999	1234 RB; 1234 TB	
	National Guard		VNG 123; VHA 123; VNA 123	
	Pearl Harbor Survivor		P/H 123	"PH" is stacked vertically and in center of plate.
	Personalized - Passenger		Six alphanumeric characters.	Three different designs.
	Prince William Sound College		PWS 123	
	Purple Heart		VPH 123; VPA 123; VPB123	
	Support Our Troops!	2008		Available in personalized format.
	University of Alaska Anchorage		UAA 123; UAA123	Two styles; newer style available in personalized format.
	University of Alaska Fairbanks		UAF 123	Two styles; newer style available in personalized format.
	University of Alaska Southeast		UAS 123	
	Veteran - Air Force		VBC 123	
	Veteran - Army		VBC 123	
	Veteran - Coast Guard		VCG 123; VCB 123; VCC123	
	Veteran - Marine Corps		VBC 123	
	Veteran - Navy		VBC 123	

=== Discontinued ===
Image	Type	Dates issued	Design	Serial format	Serials issued	Notes
	Motorcycle	1976–81	Red on white	1234 M/B	1000 M/C to 9999 M/G	Motorcycle discontinued as a separate type in 1999; merged with Non-Commercial Trailer.
	Motorcycle	1981–99	Blue on golden yellow	1234 M/B	1000 M/H to 9999 M/N	Motorcycle discontinued as a separate type in 1999; merged with Non-Commercial Trailer.
