= Vehicle registration plates of Rhode Island =

Rhode Island vehicle license plates

Rhode Island
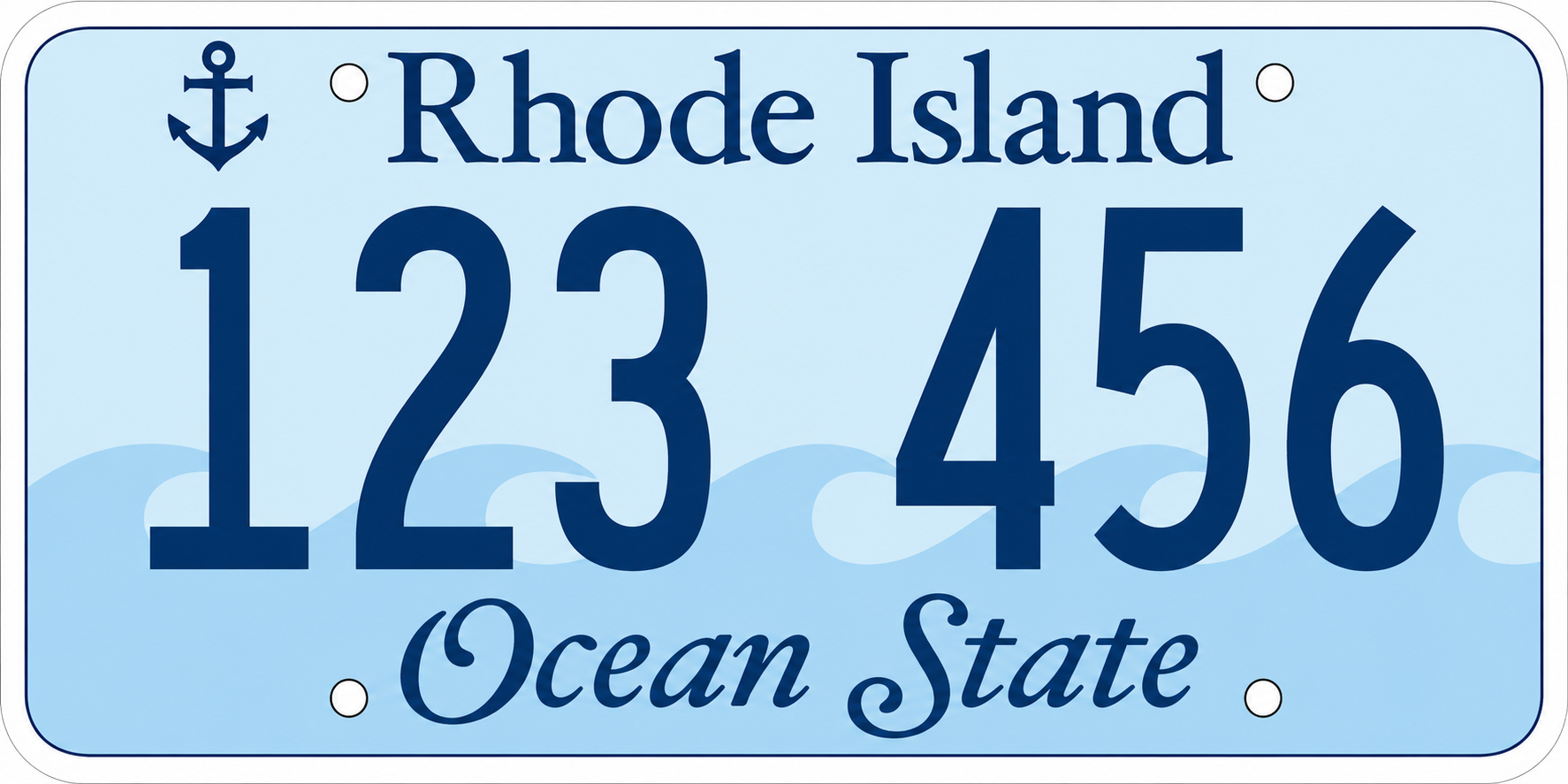

Current series
- Slogan: Ocean State
- Size: 12 in × 6 in 30 cm × 15 cm
- Material: Aluminum
- Serial format: AB-123; 123-456; 1AB234; 1A234
- Introduced: 2023

Availability
- Issued by: Rhode Island Department of Revenue, Division of Motor Vehicles

History
- First issued: April 13, 1904

The U.S. state of Rhode Island first required its residents to register their motor vehicles and display license plates in 1904. As of 2026, plates are issued by the Rhode Island Department of Revenue through its Division of Motor Vehicles. Front and rear plates are required for vehicles delivered with a front license plate mounting bracket from the factory, while only rear plates are required for motorcycles, trailers and vehicles delivered from the factory without a front license plate mounting bracket.

== Passenger baseplates ==
=== 1904 to 1960 ===
In 1956, the United States, Canada, and Mexico came to an agreement with the American Association of Motor Vehicle Administrators, the Automobile Manufacturers Association and the National Safety Council that standardized the size for license plates for vehicles (except those for motorcycles) at 6 inches (15 cm) in height by 12 inches (30 cm) in width, with standardized mounting holes. The 1956 (dated 1957) issue was the first Rhode Island license plate that complied with these standards.

| Image | Dates issued | Design | Slogan | Serial format | Serials issued | Notes |
|---|---|---|---|---|---|---|
| | 1904–08 | White serial on black porcelain plate; "REGISTERED IN R.I." at top | none | 1234 | 1 to approximately 3300 | |
| | 1908–12 | White serial on black porcelain plate; "RI" at right | none | 1234 | 3301 to approximately 8700 | |
| | 1912–17 | Black serial on white porcelain plate; vertical "RI" at left | none | 12345 | 1 to approximately 35000 | |
| | 1918 | White serial on black flat metal plate; "R.I. 1918" centered at bottom | none | 12345 | 1 to approximately 30000 | First dated plate. |
| | 1919 | Black serial on white flat metal plate; "R.I. 1919" centered at bottom | none | 12345 | 1 to approximately 32000 | |
| | 1920 | White serial on black flat metal plate; "R.I. 1920" centered at bottom | none | 12345 | 1 to approximately 37000 | |
| | 1921 | Embossed black serial on white plate with border line; "R.I. 1921" centered at bottom | none | 12345 | 1 to approximately 43000 | First embossed plate. |
| | 1922 | Embossed white serial on black plate with border line; "R.I. 1922" centered at bottom | none | 12345 | 1 to approximately 50000 | |
| | 1923 | Embossed black serial on white plate with border line; "R.I. 1923" centered at bottom | none | 12-345 | 1 to approximately 62-000 | |
| | 1924 | Embossed white serial on black plate with border line; "R.I. 1924" centered at bottom | none | 12-345 | 1 to approximately 86-000 | |
| | 1925 | Embossed black serial on white plate with border line; "R.I. 1925" centered at bottom | none | 12-345 | 1 to approximately 85-000 | |
| | 1926 | Embossed white serial on black plate with border line; "R.I. 1926" centered at top | none | 12-345 | 1 to approximately 90-000 | |
| | 1927 | Embossed black serial on white plate with border line; "27 R.I." centered at top | none | 12-345 | 1 to approximately 97-000 | |
| | 1928 | Embossed white serial on black plate with border line; "R.I. 1928" centered at bottom | none | 123-456 | 1 to approximately 108-000 | |
| | 1929 | Embossed black serial on white plate with border line; "29–R.I." centered at bottom | none | 123-456 | 1 to approximately 109-000 | |
| | 1930 | Embossed white serial on black plate with border line; "RHODE ISLAND 1930" at bottom | none | 123-456 | 1 to approximately 115-000 | First use of the full state name. |
| | 1931 | Embossed black serial on white plate with border line; "31 RHODE ISLAND" centered at bottom | none | 123-456 | 1 to approximately 116-000 | |
| | 1932 | Embossed white serial on black plate with border line; "RHODE ISLAND 1932" centered at top | none | 123-456 | 1 to approximately 113-000 | |
| | 1933 | Embossed black serial on white plate with border line; "33 RHODE ISLAND" centered at top | none | 123-456 | 1 to approximately 117-000 | |
| | 1934 | Embossed white serial on black plate with border line; "1934 RHODE ISLAND" centered at bottom | none | 123-456 | 1 to approximately 125-000 | |
| | 1935 | Embossed black serial on white plate with border line; "RHODE ISLAND 35" centered at bottom | none | 123-456 | 1 to approximately 130-000 | |
| | 1936 | Embossed white serial on black plate with border line; "1636 RHODE ISLAND 1936" centered at top | "300TH YEAR" centered at bottom | 123-456 | 1 to approximately 140-000 | Commemorated the 300th anniversary of the settlement of Rhode Island. |
| | 1937 | Embossed black serial on white plate with border line; "1937 RHODE ISLAND" centered at bottom | none | 123-456 | 1 to approximately 148-000 | |
| | 1938 | Embossed white serial on black plate; "R.I. 1938" at bottom | none | A1234 | B1 to approximately P9000 | |
| | 1939 | Embossed black serial on white plate; "R.I. 39" at top | none | A-1234 | B-1 to approximately R-5000 | |
| | 1940 | Embossed white serial on black plate; "R.I. 40" at bottom | none | A-1234 | B-1 to approximately T-4000 | |
| | 1941 | As 1939 base, but with "R.I. 41" at top | none | A-1234 | B-1 to approximately W-9000 | |
| | 1942–43 | As 1940 base, but with "R.I. 42" at bottom | none | A-1234 | B-1 to approximately W-8000 | Revalidated for 1943 with windshield stickers, due to metal conservation for World War II. |
| | 1944–46 | Embossed white serial on black plate; "R.I." at bottom, offset to left, with tab slots to right | none | A-1234 | B-1 to approximately W-5000 | Validated for 1944 with orange tabs, for 1945 with green tabs, and until July 31, 1946 with red tabs. |
| | 1946–47 | Embossed black serial on silver plate; "RHODE ISLAND" at bottom, with tab box between the two words | none | A1234 | B1 to approximately Y9999 | Validated until December 31, 1946 with silver tabs, then for 1947 with white tabs. |
| | 1948–50 | Embossed black serial on white plate; "RHODE ISLAND" at bottom, with tab slots between the two words | none | A1234 | B1 to Z9999 | Tab-slot plates validated each year with white tabs. All-numeric serials from 1 through 10000 were reserved, while 10001 through 19999 were used on replacement plates. |
| | 1948–50 | Embossed black serial on white plate; "RHODE ISLAND" at bottom, with tab slots between the two words | none | 12345 | 30001 to approximately 59000 | Tab-slot plates validated each year with white tabs. All-numeric serials from 1 through 10000 were reserved, while 10001 through 19999 were used on replacement plates. |
| | 1950 | As above, but with "50" instead of tab slots | none | 12345 | 59001 to approximately 71000 | Tab-slot plates validated each year with white tabs. All-numeric serials from 1 through 10000 were reserved, while 10001 through 19999 were used on replacement plates. |
| | 1951 | Embossed white serial on black plate; "RHODE 51 ISLAND" at bottom | none | A1234; 12345 | | 1951 plates revalidated for 1952 with windshield stickers. 1952 plates issued only to new registrants. |
| | 1952 | As above, but with "52" instead of "51" | none | A1234; 12345 | | 1951 plates revalidated for 1952 with windshield stickers. 1952 plates issued only to new registrants. |
| | 1953–54 | Embossed black serial on white plate; "RHODE 53 ISLAND" at bottom | none | A1234 | B1 to Z9999 | Revalidated for 1954 with black tabs. |
| | 1953–54 | Embossed black serial on white plate; "RHODE 53 ISLAND" at bottom | none | 12345 | 30001 to approximately 85000 | Revalidated for 1954 with black tabs. |
| | 1955–56 | Embossed white serial on black plate; "RHODE 55 ISLAND" at bottom | none | A1234 | B1 to Z9999 | Revalidated for 1956 with white tabs. |
| | 1955–56 | Embossed white serial on black plate; "RHODE 55 ISLAND" at bottom | none | 12345 | 30001 to 99999 | Revalidated for 1956 with white tabs. |
| | 1957–58 | Embossed black serial on white plate with border line; "RHODE ISLAND 57" at top | none | AB123 | AA1 to WW999 | Letters I, Q and U not used in serials, and X, Y and Z used only on replacement plates. Revalidated for 1958 with black tabs. |
| | 1959–60 | Embossed white serial on black plate with border line; "RHODE ISLAND 59" at top | none | AB123 | AA1 to WW999 | Unused and replacement serial letters same as on 1957–58 base. Revalidated for 1960 with white tabs. |

=== 1961 to present ===
| Image | Dates issued | Design | Slogan | Serial format | Serials issued | Notes |
|---|---|---|---|---|---|---|
| | 1961–66 | Embossed black serial on white plate with border line; "RHODE ISLAND" at top, offset to left | none | AB123 | AA1 to WW999; AI1 to approximately KX500 | Validated each year with stickers, placed to the right of the state name. Letters I, Q, U, X, Y and Z used in standard serials from 1965 after the original allocation was exhausted. |
| | 1967–71 | Embossed black serial on non-reflective white plate with border line; "RHODE ISLAND" centered at bottom | "DISCOVER" centered at top | AB·123 | AA·100 to ZZ·999 (see right) | Revalidated with stickers until 1980. After serial KZ·999 was issued, the letters I, Q, U, X, Y and Z were not used until WW·999 was reached in 1969, after which all serials with Q, U, X, Y and Z as the first letter were issued. |
| | 1972–79 | As 1967–71 base, but reflective | "OCEAN STATE" centered at top | AB-123 | Unused and reissued 1967–71 serials | Issued only to new registrants. During 1977, some plates were manufactured in New York, using that state's serial dies (with the letters taller than the digits) and omitting the slogan. |
| | 1980–86 | Embossed blue serial on reflective white plate with border line; "RHODE ISLAND" embossed in blue centered at bottom; blue anchor embossed at top left and last two digits of year of issue at top right | "OCEAN STATE" embossed in blue centered at top | AB-123 | AA-100 to ZZ-999 (see right) | On all variants of this base, serials were issued and reissued in random order, as existing registrants generally retained the serials from their previous plates (including 1967–79 plates) when receiving new ones. During 1992, plates were manufactured in Massachusetts, using that state's serial dies. |
| | 1986 | As above, but with "Rhode Island" screened in blue centered at bottom | "Ocean State" screened in blue centered at top | AB-123 | AA-100 to ZZ-999 (see right) | On all variants of this base, serials were issued and reissued in random order, as existing registrants generally retained the serials from their previous plates (including 1967–79 plates) when receiving new ones. During 1992, plates were manufactured in Massachusetts, using that state's serial dies. |
| | 1987–93 | As 1980–86 all-embossed plates, but without year of issue | "OCEAN STATE" as on 1980–86 all-embossed plates | AB-123 | AA-100 to ZZ-999 (see right) | On all variants of this base, serials were issued and reissued in random order, as existing registrants generally retained the serials from their previous plates (including 1967–79 plates) when receiving new ones. During 1992, plates were manufactured in Massachusetts, using that state's serial dies. |
| | 1993–95 | As above, but with state name (still all upper case) and anchor screened | "OCEAN STATE" as above, but screened | AB-123 | AA-100 to ZZ-999 (see right) | On all variants of this base, serials were issued and reissued in random order, as existing registrants generally retained the serials from their previous plates (including 1967–79 plates) when receiving new ones. During 1992, plates were manufactured in Massachusetts, using that state's serial dies. |
| | 1995–96 | As 1987–93 plates | "OCEAN STATE" as on 1987–93 plates | AB-123 | AA-100 to ZZ-999 (see right) | On all variants of this base, serials were issued and reissued in random order, as existing registrants generally retained the serials from their previous plates (including 1967–79 plates) when receiving new ones. During 1992, plates were manufactured in Massachusetts, using that state's serial dies. |
| | 1996–2023 | Embossed navy blue serial on reflective white plate with gray wave graphic; "Rhode Island" screened in navy blue centered at top; navy blue anchor screened at top left | "Ocean State" screened in navy blue centered at bottom | 12345 (variable number of digits) AB-12 and AB-123 123-456 1AB234 / 1AB 234 | 1 to 99999 AA-00 to ZZ-999 (1996–07, 2015–20) 710-001 to 399-999 (leading number progresses in reverse) (2007–15) 1AA 100 to 1KV 999 (2020–23) | Colloquially referred to as the "wave plate". Serials in the 1AL to 1BQ series of the latest format did not contain a space after the letters. |
| | 2023–present | Screened navy blue serial on reflective light blue plate with five-wave graphic; "Rhode Island" screened in navy blue centered at top; navy blue anchor screened at top left | "Ocean State" script screened in navy blue centered at bottom | 1AB 234 (plus remakes of previously-issued serials) | 1LE 100 to 1ZF 266 (as of January 30, 2025) | Referred to as the Ocean Plate. |

== Optional plates ==
| Image | Dates issued | Design | Slogan | Serial format | Serials issued | Notes |
|---|---|---|---|---|---|---|
| | 1992–present | Embossed blue serial on reflective white plate; gray sailboat graphic screened in the center; "RHODE ISLAND" screened in red centered at top, with five red stripes to left and right; blue bar screened at bottom containing thirteen white stars | "Ocean State" screened in blue centered between sailboat and blue bar | as requested by registrant: 12345; AB-12; AB-123 | | |
| | 2023–present | Embossed navy blue serial on graphic of a Mako Shark in water; "Rhode Island" screened in dark blue centered at top between two dark blue sharks; white border | "Atlantic Shark Institute" screened in dark blue below state name. | Remakes of any standard format | Registrants transferring plates keep existing combination. | |

== Non-passenger plates ==
| Image | Type | Dates issued | Design | Serial format | Serials issued | Notes |
|---|---|---|---|---|---|---|
| | Commercial | 1996–2000 | Similar to wave passenger base but with "COMMERCIAL" in lieu of Ocean State | 123456 | 1 to 260089, plus reissues of dormant serials | |
| | Commercial | 2023–present | As above, but with Ocean Wave background | 123456 | 1 to 260089, plus reissues of dormant serials | |
| | Combination | 1996–2023 | Similar to wave passenger base but with "COMBINATION" in lieu of Ocean State | 123456 | 1 to 260089, plus reissues of dormant serials | |
| | Combination | 2023–present | As above, but with Ocean Wave background | 123456 | 1 to 260089, plus reissues of dormant serials | |
| | Fire (Municipal) | ####–present | White Background with red embossing, Fire on top, Rhode Island on bottom | 123 | | Used for fire apparatus and non-private recuses |
| | Jitney | 1996–2023 | Similar to wave passenger base but with "JITNEY" in leui of Ocean State | 1234 | | Used by Rhode Island Public transit authority buses |
| | Jitney | 2023–present | As above, but with Ocean Wave background | 1234 | | Used by Rhode Island Public transit authority buses |
| | Motorcycle | 1996–2000 | Similar to wave passenger base but with border line; "MOTORCYCLE" embossed at top and "RI" at bottom left | 12345 | 1 to 99999, plus reissues of dormant serials | |
| | Motorcycle | 2023–present | As above, but with "MOTORCYCLE" and "RI" screened, and with anchor at top left | 12345 | 1 to 99999, plus reissues of dormant serials | |
| | Municipal | ####–present | White background, embossed with "TOWN" or "CITY" with RHODE ISLAND at the bottom | 123 | | Used for town and city vehicles |
| | Police (Municipal) | ####–present | Blue Background with Ocean State with anchor on top, "Police" diagonally descending (left justified), with Rhode Island on bottom | 123 | | used by town or city police vehicles |
| | Public | 1996–2023 | Similar to wave passenger base but with "PUBLIC" in leui of Ocean State | 1234 | | used by Rhode Island Transit Authority vehicles and vehicles for hire (i.e. chauffeur) |
| | Public | 2023–present | As above, but with Ocean Wave background | 1234 | | used by Rhode Island Transit Authority vehicles and vehicles for hire (i.e. chauffeur) |
| | Radio Operator | 1996–2000 | Indistinguishable from the private passenger registration type | AB#BBB, AB#BB, where A=(A,K,N,W), B=(A-Z), #=(0-9) | | |
| | Radio Operator | 2023–present | As above, but with RADIO OPERATOR in leui of Ocean State | AB#BBB, AB#BB, where A=(A,K,N,W), B=(A-Z), #=(0-9) | | |
| | State | ####–present | White or Yellow background, state seal with RHODE ISLAND in alternate sailboat style | 123 | | Used by state vehicles and Publicly owned utilities (i.e. Kent County Water Authority, Narragansett Bay Commission, etc) |
| | State Police | ####–present | Black background white text, Ocean State with anchor on top, State Police double line left justified, with Rhode Island on bottom | 123 | | |
| | Sheriff | ####–2026 | Blue Background with "Sheriff" and anchor on top with Rhode Island on bottom | 12 | | |
| | Sheriff | 2026–present | Blue Background with Rhode Island and anchor on top with "Sheriff" on bottom | 12 | | |

== Trivia ==
License plates with low serial numbers have been distributed by politicians, as a way of rewarding supporters or associates, since the state first issued plates in 1904. Such plates have become a status symbol, similar to Delaware's low-numbered plates.

Additionally, an official lottery for so-called "preferred plates" was implemented in 1995 through the Governor's Office. Passenger plates with serials consisting of two letters and up to two digits, one letter and up to three digits, or all-numeric with up to five digits, are considered "preferred plates", as are commercial, motorcycle and combination plates with serials up to four digits, war veterans' plates with serials up to three digits, and National Guard plates with serials up to two digits.

Rhode Island is also one of the few states that allows plate owners to transfer their plates to other family members in their will.

Rhode Island reissues plate numbers to new owners if that plate number is a inactive plate not registered in several years.
