= Vehicle registration plates of Minnesota =

Minnesota vehicle license plates

Minnesota
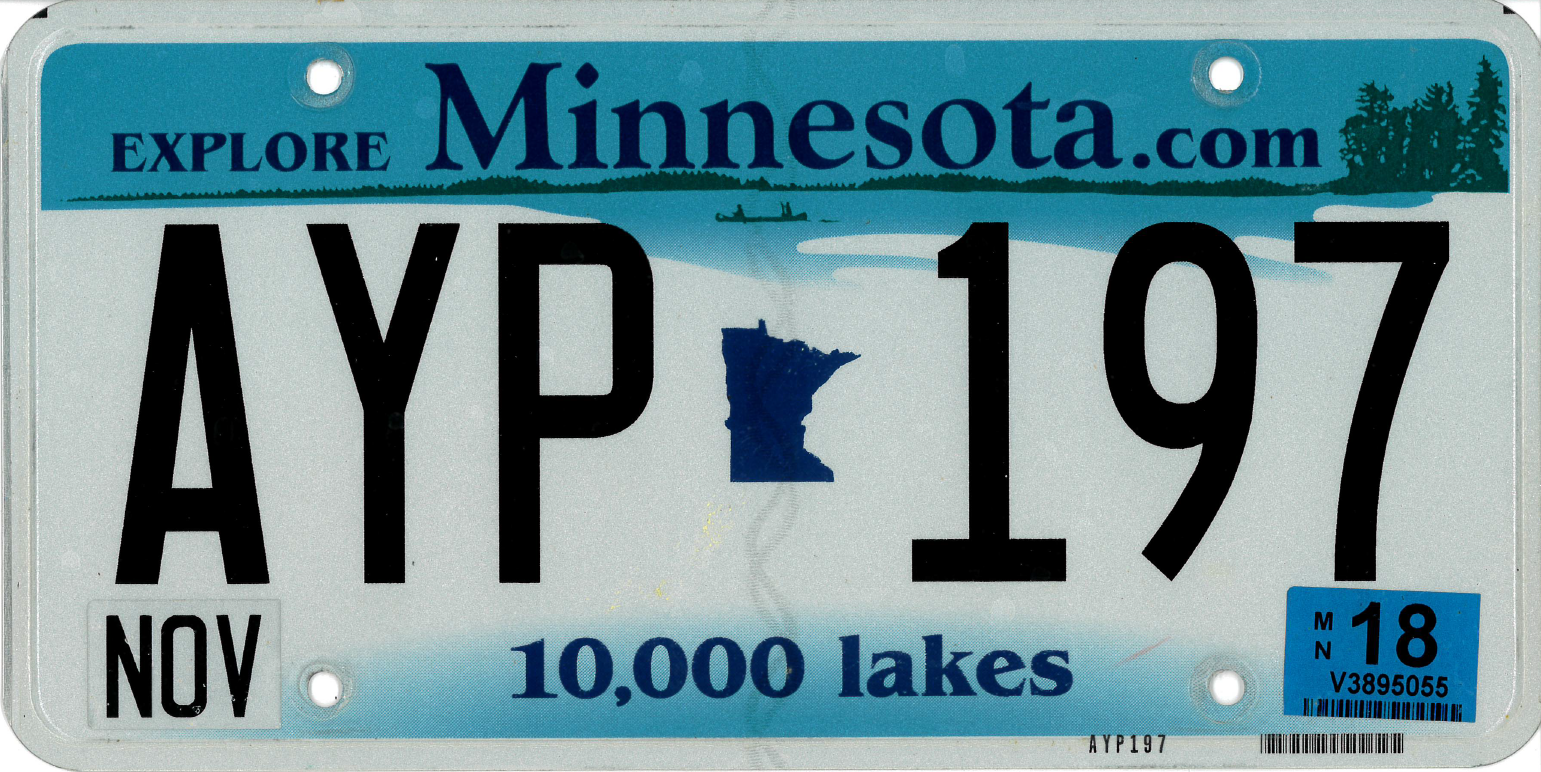

Current series
- Slogan: 10,000 Lakes
- Size: 12 in × 6 in 30 cm × 15 cm
- Material: Aluminum
- Serial format: ABC 123; 123 ABC (Switches on a rolling basis)
- Introduced: June 2008

Availability
- Issued by: Minnesota Department of Public Safety, Driver and Vehicle Services Division

History
- First issued: May 15, 1909 (pre-state plates from 1903 through May 14, 1909)

The U.S. state of Minnesota first required its residents to register their motor vehicles in 1903. Registrants provided their own license plates for display until 1909, when the state began to issue plates.

As of 2026, plates are issued by the Minnesota Department of Public Safety through its Driver and Vehicle Services Division. Front and rear plates are required for most classes of vehicles, while only rear plates are required for motorcycles and trailers.

== Passenger baseplates ==
The first automobile license plate in Minnesota, 1903.

=== 1909 to 1954 ===
Image	Dates issued	Design	Slogan	Serial format	Serials issued	Notes
	1909	Silver serial on orange flat metal plate; vertical "MINN" and "1909" in silver at left and right respectively	none	1234	1 to approximately 7000	
	1910	Gold serial on black flat metal plate; vertical "MINN" and "1910" in gold at left and right respectively	none	12345	1 to approximately 12000	
	1911	White serial on dark blue porcelain plate; vertical "MINN" and "1911" in white at left and right respectively	none	12345	1 to approximately 20000	
	1912–14	Black serial on silver plate; vertical "MINN" in black at left and "1912", "1913" and "1914" at right	none	12345	1 to approximately 67000	
	1915–16	Red serial on silver plate; vertical "MINNESOTA" at left and "1915", "1916" and "1917" at right	none	123456	1 to approximately 139000	
	1917	As above, but with vertical "MINN" in red at left	none	123456	139001 to approximately 191000	
	1918–20	Embossed white serial on black plate; vertical "MINN" at left and "1918", "1919" and "1920" at right	none	123456	1 to approximately 325000	
	1920	As above, but with only "1920" at right	none	123456	325001 to approximately 333000	
	1921	Embossed black serial on sky blue plate with border line; vertical "MINN" at right; "21" at bottom left	none	A123-456	A1 to approximately A142-000	Weight classes introduced, with 'A' used for vehicles weighing 2,000 lb or less, and 'B' for vehicles above 2,000 lb. This practice continued through 1939.
	1921	Embossed black serial on sky blue plate with border line; vertical "MINN" at right; "21" at bottom left	none	B123-456	B1 to approximately B160-000	Weight classes introduced, with 'A' used for vehicles weighing 2,000 lb or less, and 'B' for vehicles above 2,000 lb. This practice continued through 1939.
	1922	Embossed black serial on off-white plate; vertical "MINN" at right; "22" at bottom left	none	A123-456	A1 to approximately A176-000	
	1922	Embossed black serial on off-white plate; vertical "MINN" at right; "22" at bottom left	none	B123-456	B1 to approximately B175-000	
	1923	Embossed brown serial on gray plate with border line; vertical "MINN" at right; "23" at bottom left	none	A123-456	A1 to approximately A224-000	
	1923	Embossed brown serial on gray plate with border line; vertical "MINN" at right; "23" at bottom left	none	B123-456	B1 to approximately B173-000	
	1924	Embossed white serial on dark blue plate with border line; vertical "MINN" at left; "24" at bottom right	none	123-456A	1A to approximately 242-000A	
	1924	Embossed white serial on dark blue plate with border line; vertical "MINN" at left; "24" at bottom right	none	123-456B	1B to approximately 222-000B	
	1925	Embossed black serial on silver plate with border line; vertical "MINN" at right; "25" at bottom left	none	A123-456	A1 to approximately A268-000	
	1925	Embossed black serial on silver plate with border line; vertical "MINN" at right; "25" at bottom left	none	B123-456	B1 to approximately B256-000	
	1926	Embossed white serial on black plate with border line; vertical "MINN" at right; "26" at bottom left	none	A123-456	A1 to approximately A249-000	
	1926	Embossed white serial on black plate with border line; vertical "MINN" at right; "26" at bottom left	none	B123-456	B1 to approximately B302-000	
	1927	Embossed light green serial on dark green plate with border line; vertical "MINN" at right; "27" at bottom left	none	A123-456	A1 to approximately A258-000	
	1927	Embossed light green serial on dark green plate with border line; vertical "MINN" at right; "27" at bottom left	none	B123-456	B1 to approximately B293-000	
	1928	Embossed black serial on tan plate with border line; vertical "MINN" at right; "28" at bottom left	none	A123-456	A1 to approximately A243-000	
	1928	Embossed black serial on tan plate with border line; vertical "MINN" at right; "28" at bottom left	none	B123-456	B1 to approximately B326-000	
	1929	Embossed white serial on black plate with border line; vertical "MINN" at right; "29" at bottom left	none	A123-456	A1 to approximately A245-000	
	1929	Embossed white serial on black plate with border line; vertical "MINN" at right; "29" at bottom left	none	B123-456	B1 to approximately B379-000	
	1930	Embossed black serial on silver plate with border line; vertical "MINN" at right; "30" at bottom left	none	A123-456	A1 to approximately A196-000	
	1930	Embossed black serial on silver plate with border line; vertical "MINN" at right; "30" at bottom left	none	B123-456	B1 to approximately B428-000	
	1931	Embossed white serial on black plate with border line; vertical "MINN" at right; "31" at bottom left	none	A123-456	A1 to approximately A130-000	
	1931	Embossed white serial on black plate with border line; vertical "MINN" at right; "31" at bottom left	none	B123-456	B1 to approximately B453-000	
	1932	Embossed golden yellow serial on maroon plate with border line; vertical "MINN" at right; "32" at bottom left	none	A123-456	A1 to approximately A111-000	
	1932	Embossed golden yellow serial on maroon plate with border line; vertical "MINN" at right; "32" at bottom left	none	B123-456	B1 to approximately B457-000	
	1933	As 1930 base, but with "33" at bottom left	none	A12-345	A1 to approximately A94-000	
	1933	As 1930 base, but with "33" at bottom left	none	B123-456	B1 to approximately B475-000	
	1934	As 1931 base, but with "34" at bottom left	none	A12-345	A1 to approximately A89-000	
	1934	As 1931 base, but with "34" at bottom left	none	B123-456	B1 to approximately B499-000	
	1935	As 1932 base, but with "35" at bottom left	none	A12-345	A1 to approximately A72-000	
	1935	As 1932 base, but with "35" at bottom left	none	B123-456	B1 to approximately B545-000	
	1936	Embossed white serial on dark blue plate with border line; vertical "MINN" at right; "36" at bottom left	none	A12-345	A1 to approximately A58-000	
	1936	Embossed white serial on dark blue plate with border line; vertical "MINN" at right; "36" at bottom left	none	B123-456	B1 to approximately B612-000	
	1937	Embossed black serial on silver plate with border line; vertical "MINN" at right; "37" at bottom left	none	A12-345	A1 to approximately A40-000	
	1937	Embossed black serial on silver plate with border line; vertical "MINN" at right; "37" at bottom left	none	B123-456	B1 to approximately B664-000	
	1938	Embossed silver serial on black plate with border line; vertical "MINN" at right; "38" at bottom left	none	A12-345	A1 to approximately A25-000	
	1938	Embossed silver serial on black plate with border line; vertical "MINN" at right; "38" at bottom left	none	B123-456	B1 to approximately B674-000	
	1939	Embossed black serial on golden yellow plate with border line; vertical "MINN" at right; "39" at bottom left	none	A12-345	A1 to approximately A15-000	
	1939	Embossed black serial on golden yellow plate with border line; vertical "MINN" at right; "39" at bottom left	none	B123-456	B1 to approximately B696-000	
	1940	Embossed white serial on black plate with border line; "MINN - 1940" or "MINNESOTA 1940" (see right) centered at bottom	none	123-456	1 to approximately 734-000	The abbreviated state name was used on plates with serials of up to four digits (1 through 9999), and the full state name on plates with five- or six-digit serials. This practice continued through 1948.
	1941	Embossed black serial on silver plate with border line; "MINN - 1941" or "MINNESOTA 1941" centered at bottom	none	123-456	1 to approximately 763-000	
	1942–43	Embossed red serial on cream plate with border line; "MINN - 1942" or "MINNESOTA 1942" centered at bottom	none	123-456	1 to approximately 748-000	Revalidated for 1943 with black tabs, due to metal conservation for World War II.
	1944	Embossed white serial on navy blue plate with border line; "MINN - 1944" or "MINNESOTA 1944" centered at bottom	none	123-456	1 to approximately 641-000	
	1945	As 1941 base, but with "MINN - 1945" or "MINNESOTA 1945" at bottom	none	123-456	1 to approximately 633-000	
	1946	As 1940 base, but with "MINN - 1946" or "MINNESOTA 1946" at bottom	none	123-456	1 to approximately 660-000	
	1947	As 1941 base, but with "MINN - 1947" or "MINNESOTA 1947" at bottom	none	123-456	1 to approximately 717-000	
	1948	As 1940 base, but with "MINN - 1948" or "MINNESOTA 1948" at bottom	none	123-456	1 to approximately 801-000	
	1949	Embossed black serial on waffle-textured silver plate; "MINNESOTA" centered at top	"1849 - CENTENNIAL - 1949" at bottom	123-456	1 to approximately 871-000	Commemorated the 100th anniversary of the creation of the Minnesota Territory.
	1950	Embossed white serial on black plate with border line; "19 MINNESOTA 50" at bottom	"10,000 LAKES" centered at top	123-456	1 to approximately 962-000	First use of the "10,000 Lakes" slogan.
	1951	Embossed black serial on silver plate with border line; "19 MINNESOTA 51" at bottom	"10,000 LAKES" centered at top	123-456 1-234-567	1 to approximately 1-005-000	
	1952	Embossed blue serial on gold plate with border line; "19 MINNESOTA 52" at bottom	"10,000 LAKES" centered at top	123-456	1 to approximately 994-000	
	1953	Embossed white serial on black plate with border line; "19 MINNESOTA 53" at bottom	"10,000 LAKES" centered at top	123-456; 1-234-567	1 to approximately 1-040-000	
	1954	Embossed blue serial on cream plate with border line; "19 MINNESOTA 54" at bottom	"10,000 LAKES" centered at top	123-456; 1-234-567	1 to approximately 1-075-000	

=== 1955 to present ===
In 1956, the United States, Canada, and Mexico came to an agreement with the American Association of Motor Vehicle Administrators, the Automobile Manufacturers Association and the National Safety Council that standardized the size for license plates for vehicles (except those for motorcycles) at 6 inches (15 cm) in height by 12 inches (30 cm) in width, with standardized mounting holes. The 1954 (dated 1955) issue was the first Minnesota license plate that complied with these standards.

Since 1989, Minnesota law has required license plates to be replaced every seven years, due to deterioration of the reflective material.

Image	Dates issued	Design	Slogan	Serial format	Serials issued	Notes
	1955	Embossed yellow serial on maroon plate with border line; "19 MINNESOTA 55" at bottom	"10,000 LAKES" centered at top	AB 1234	First letter corresponds to congressional district of issue	First 6" x 12" plate. Letters A, B, C, E, F, G, H, J and K were used to indicate the nine congressional districts of the time, in that order.
	1955	Embossed yellow serial on maroon plate with border line; "19 MINNESOTA 55" at bottom	"10,000 LAKES" centered at top	LB 1234; MB 1234	LA 1000 to approximately MD 9999	Mail-order issues.
	1956–57	Embossed green serial on reflective white plate with border line; "19 MINNESOTA 56" at bottom	"10,000 LAKES" centered at top	1B 1234	First number corresponds to congressional district of issue	Revalidated for 1957 with gold tabs.
	1956–57	Embossed green serial on reflective white plate with border line; "19 MINNESOTA 56" at bottom	"10,000 LAKES" centered at top	MB 1234		Mail-order issues.
	1958–59	Embossed blue serial on reflective white plate with border line; "19 MINNESOTA 58" at bottom	"10,000 LAKES" centered at top	1B 1234	First number corresponds to congressional district of issue	Revalidated for 1959 with green tabs.
	1958–59	Embossed blue serial on reflective white plate with border line; "19 MINNESOTA 58" at bottom	"10,000 LAKES" centered at top	MB 1234		Mail-order issues.
	1960–61	Embossed black serial on reflective white plate with border line; "19 MINNESOTA 60" at bottom	"10,000 LAKES" within embossed black bar centered at top	1B 1234	First number corresponds to congressional district of issue	Revalidated for 1961 with blue tabs.
	1960–61	Embossed black serial on reflective white plate with border line; "19 MINNESOTA 60" at bottom	"10,000 LAKES" within embossed black bar centered at top	MB 1234		Mail-order issues.
	1962–64	Embossed maroon serial on reflective white plate with border line; "MINNESOTA" within embossed maroon bar centered at bottom; "19" at bottom left and "62" at bottom right	"10,000 LAKES" within embossed maroon bar centered at top	1B 1234	First number corresponds to congressional district of issue	Revalidated for 1963 with green tabs, and for 1964 with yellow tabs.
	1962–64	Embossed maroon serial on reflective white plate with border line; "MINNESOTA" within embossed maroon bar centered at bottom; "19" at bottom left and "62" at bottom right	"10,000 LAKES" within embossed maroon bar centered at top	MB 1234		Mail-order issues.
	1965–67	Embossed green serial on reflective white plate with border line; "19 MINNESOTA 65" at bottom	"10,000 LAKES" centered at top	1BC 123	First number corresponds to congressional district of issue	Revalidated for 1966 and 1967 with stickers.
	1965–67	Embossed green serial on reflective white plate with border line; "19 MINNESOTA 65" at bottom	"10,000 LAKES" centered at top	MBC 123	MAA 100 to approximately MLC 999	Mail-order issues.
	1968–70	Embossed blue serial on reflective white plate with border line; "MINNESOTA" within embossed blue bar centered at bottom; "19" at bottom left and "68" at bottom right	"10,000 LAKES" within embossed blue bar centered at top	1BC 123	First number corresponds to congressional district of issue	Revalidated for 1969 and 1970 with stickers.
	1968–70	Embossed blue serial on reflective white plate with border line; "MINNESOTA" within embossed blue bar centered at bottom; "19" at bottom left and "68" at bottom right	"10,000 LAKES" within embossed blue bar centered at top	MBC 123	MAA 100 to approximately MNN 999	Mail-order issues.
	1971–73	Embossed green serial on reflective white plate with border line; "19 MINNESOTA 71" at bottom	"10,000 LAKES" centered at top	1BC 123	First number corresponds to congressional district of issue	Revalidated for 1972 and 1973 with stickers.
	1971–73	Embossed green serial on reflective white plate with border line; "19 MINNESOTA 71" at bottom	"10,000 LAKES" centered at top	MBC 123	MAA 100 to approximately MPA 999	Mail-order issues.
	1974–77	Embossed orange serial on reflective white plate with border line; "MINNESOTA" centered at bottom; "19" at top left and "74" at top right	"10,000 LAKES" centered at top	AB 1234	AA 1000 to approximately PW 3999	Some plates manufactured using Illinois' serial dies. Monthly staggered registration introduced 1975.
	1977	Embossed blue serial on reflective white plate with border line; "MINNESOTA" centered at top	"10,000 LAKES" centered at bottom	ABC 123	AAA 001 to CGZ 999	
	1978–82	Embossed blue serial on reflective graphic plate featuring a lake scene with pale blue and white water, pale blue sky, green island and trees, and a small green canoe; "Minnesota" screened in blue centered at top	"10,000 lakes" screened in blue centered at bottom	ABC 123	CHA 001 to approximately FOR 999	
	1982–87	As above, but with embossed state shape used as separator in serial	"10,000 lakes" screened in blue centered at bottom	ABC-123	LAA-001 to approximately RMF-999	
	1987–93	As 1978–87 base, but with darker colors	"EXPLORE" screened in blue to left of state name, giving "Explore Minnesota"; "10,000 lakes" screened in blue centered at bottom	123-ABC	001-AAA to approximately 999-HZK	Replaced all 1977–87 plates.
	1993–97	As 1978–87 base, but with darker colors	"EXPLORE" screened in blue to left of state name, giving "Explore Minnesota"; "10,000 lakes" screened in blue centered at bottom	123-ABC	001-HZL to approximately 999-PYW	White section of water now fades into the light blue band at the bottom containing the "10,000 lakes" slogan.
	1997–2000	As 1978–87 base, but with darker colors	"EXPLORE" screened in blue to left of state name, giving "Explore Minnesota"; "10,000 lakes" screened in blue centered at bottom	ABC-123	AAA-001 to DBZ-999	Material changed from steel to aluminum.
	2000 – June; 2008	As 1978–87 base, but with darker colors	"EXPLORE" screened in blue to left of state name, giving "Explore Minnesota"; "10,000 lakes" screened in blue centered at bottom	ABC-123	DCA-001 to XZZ-999; SAA-001 to SZZ-999	White section of water increased in size; fade to light blue at bottom now occurs behind the "10,000 lakes" slogan. 'W', 'Y' and 'Z' series of serials not used; 'S' series issued after 'X' series.
	June 2008 – June; 2009	As 1987–2008 base, but with screened black serial and dark blue state-shaped separator, and state name in a different serifed font	"EXPLORE" and "10,000 lakes" as on 1987–2008 base, but in a different serifed font	123-ABC	001-AAA to 999-XZZ	'B' series of serials reserved for mail-order issues. 'F', 'S', 'Y' and 'Z' series not used.
	June 2009 – September 2017	As 1987–2008 base, but with screened black serial and dark blue state-shaped separator, and state name in a different serifed font	As before but with ".com" added to right of state name, giving "Explore Minnesota.com"	123-ABC	001-AAA to 999-XZZ	'B' series of serials reserved for mail-order issues. 'F', 'S', 'Y' and 'Z' series not used.
	September 2017 – present	As 1987–2008 base, but with screened black serial and dark blue state-shaped separator, and state name in a different serifed font	As before but with ".com" added to right of state name, giving "Explore Minnesota.com"	ABC-123	AAA-001 to UWM-524 (as of November 7th 2026)	'M', 'N' and 'P' series of serials reserved for mail-order issues.

== Optional plates ==
Image	Type	Dates issued	Design	Serial format	Serials issued	Notes
	Blackout	January 1, 2024 – April 30, 2025	Screened white serial on black plate; white state outline used as separator; "Minnesota" and "10,000 lakes" screened in white centered at top and bottom respectively	ZBC-123	ZAA-001 to ZZZ-999	Series ZXA through ZXZ reserved for mail-order issues.
	Blackout	May 1, 2025 – Present	Screened white serial on black plate; white state outline used as separator; "Minnesota" and "10,000 lakes" screened in white centered at top and bottom respectively	123-ZBC	001-ZAA to 236-ZYR (as of November 12, 2026)	
	Critical Habitat – Chickadee	May 2009 – present	Screened black serial on green plate, with a chickadee on left. "Reinvest in Minnesota" and "Critical Habitat" centered at top and bottom respectively	4AB123		
	Critical Habitat – Classic Deer	June 1996 – present		AB123; 1AB123	AA001 to HZ999; NA001 to NZ999; 1AA001 to 1AC958 (as of June 2019)	First "Critical habitat" license plates and the only ones that are embossed. The screened version was released much later. Letters I, O, Q are not used for all the "Critical Habitat" plates, this practice still continues today.
	Critical Habitat – Common loon	April 2002 – present	Screened black serial on fall landscape with lake plate, with a common loon in left. "Reinvest in Minnesota" and "Critical Habitat" centered at top and bottom respectively	AB123; 2AB123	JA 001 to MZ 999; PA 001 to ZZ 999; 2AA001 to 2GE068 (as of June 2019)	The first version is with blue serial and continued registrations after Classic Deer plates.
	Critical Habitat – Fishing	May 2009 – present	Screened black serial on landscape sunset plate, with two fishermen in a boat in left. "Reinvest in Minnesota" and "Critical Habitat" centered at top and bottom respectively, but the "O" is a fishing float	3AB123		
	Critical Habitat – Lady slipper	May 2009 – present	Screened black serial on pink plate, with a lady slipper orchid on left. "Reinvest in Minnesota" and "Critical Habitat" centered at top and bottom respectively	5AB123		
	Critical Habitat – Moose	August 2014 – present	Screened black serial on light blue plate, with a moose on left. "Reinvest in Minnesota" and "Critical Habitat" centered at top and bottom respectively	8AB123		The chosen design is part of Les Kouba painting, his signature is present on the left as well.
	Critical Habitat – Pheasant	November 2013 – present	Screened black serial on ocher plate, with two pheasants who flight on left. "Reinvest in Minnesota" and "Critical Habitat" centered at top and bottom respectively	7AB123		
	Critical Habitat – White-tailed deer	May 2009 – present	Screened black serial on light yellow at the top and grey plate, with a white-tailed dear on left. "Reinvest in Minnesota" and "Critical Habitat" centered at top and bottom respectively	6AB123		
	Critical Habitat – Wild turkey	November 2016 – present	Screened black serial on fall landscape plate, with a wild turkey in left. "Reinvest in Minnesota" and "Critical Habitat" centered at top and bottom respectively	9AB123		
	Golf	July 2015 – present	Screened black serial on graphic plate with light blue sky at top, golf course at bottom and black silhouette of golfer at left; "PLAY GOLF Minnesota" screened in blue (plus a golf ball for the 'O' in the state name) at top and "The Game For A Lifetime" in white at bottom	CB123; 1234CB	CA001 to approximately CE999; 0001CA to present	
	Minnesota Lynx	January 2024–Present	Screened black serial on a white plate with "lake blue" bars on the top and bottom with a lynx-print pattern; "aurora green" lines border the inside of the bars. A Minnesota Lynx logo is on the left in the middle white section. The top text reads "Minnesota" in the same font as the standard plate, and the bottom reads "The Minnesota Fastbreak Foundation"	000AA0		
	Minnesota Timberwolves	January 2024–Present	Screened black serial on a dark blue gradient plate with the top having a blue monochrome lakeside design featuring groups of pine trees on either side of the "Minnesota" text, the left containing a green aurora and the right with the moon. The Timberwolves logo is on the left side of the plate, and "The Minnesota Fastbreak Foundation" is on the bottom of the plate.	000AA0		
	Minnesota Twins	January 2024–Present	Screened navy blue serial on a white plate with a navy blue bar across the top with a small repeating "M" logo that is used the Twins' "road" hat from their 2023 uniform redesign. It contains the "Minnesota" text. The middle features the Twins interlocking "TC" logo featuring a navy blue "T" and a red "C". The bottom has a red bar with white text at the bottom saying "This is Twins Territory" with "Twins" in the font from the primary jersey.	000AA0		The motorcycle variant uses black text instead of navy blue.
	Minnesota United FC	October 2024–Present	Screened white serial on a black plate with a light blue "Minnesota" text on top and "United" on the bottom. The plate features a grey wing design that matches the feathers in the Minnesota United FC logo that is on the left.	000AA0		This plate was originally set to be released with the other sports teams in January 2024. Previous state laws required that plateholders make a contribution to the teams' foundation through registration fees, and Minnesota United does not have one. The law was amended in 2024 to allow other philanthropic pursuits. Minnesota United FC chose the Minnesota Loon Restoration Project, a state-run initiative.
	Minnesota Vikings	January 2024–Present	Screened black serial on a white plate with a top purple-white gradient bar with "Minnesota" in purple. The right of the top bar features pine tree silhouettes, and the left features a silhouetted Minneapolis skyline that includes U.S. Bank Stadium.	00AA00		
	Minnesota Wild	January 2024–Present	Screened black serial on a white plate with a green-white gradient bar with "Minnesota" on the top in green. The left and right feature pine trees and lakefronts with the right side depicting two ice hockey players playing on a frozen body of water. The middle of the plate features the Wild logo center left. Text on the bottom reads "State of Hockey" in green.	000AA0		
	State Parks and Trails	October 2016 – present	Screened black serial on landscape with a wood bridge and a boat in left. "Minnesota" and "STATE PARK AND TRAILS" centered at top and bottom respectively	1PB123	1PA001 to 1PH850 (as of June 2019)	Plate created as part of the 125th anniversary celebration of Minnesota state parks and trails. The design was chosen in July 2016 after an online vote.
	Support Our Troops	December 2005 – present	Screened blue or black serial (see right) on graphic plate with national flag in background and bald eagle at left; "Minnesota" and "SUPPORT OUR TROOPS" screened in blue centered at top and bottom respectively	123AB; 1234AB	001AA to approximately 999EH; 0001AA to present	Original design had a blue serial over a full national flag background. Current design has a black serial on a white section in the middle, plus a different font for the "Support Our Troops" slogan.

== Non-passenger plates ==
Image	Type	Dates issued	Design	Serial format	Serials issued	Notes
	Farm Truck	1997–2008	Embossed green serial on white plate; "MINNESOTA" and "FARM TRUCK" centered at top and bottom respectively; weight class sticker at right	T/L C1234	T/L A0001 to approxminately T/L D5200	
	Farm Truck	2008–present	As current passenger base; "Farm Truck" centered at bottom, "FEB" at bottom left and weight class sticker at right	TLC1234	TLD5201 to TLJ1941 (as of July 20, 2022)	
	Motorcycle	1976–80	Embossed blue serial on white plate; "MINNESOTA" and "M.C." centered at top and bottom respectively	123-456	000-001 to approximately 350-000	
	Motorcycle	1981–90	As above, but with "10,000 LAKES" at bottom, offset to left	M/B 12-345	M/L 00-001 to M/N 99-999; M/R 00-001 to approximately M/R 65-000	
	Motorcycle	1990–99	As above, but with "10,000 LAKES" at bottom, offset to left	12-345 M/B	00-001 M/A to approximately 60-000 M/C	
	Motorcycle	1999–2008	As above, but with "FEB M.C." in place of slogan	12-345 M/B	60-001 M/C to approximately 24-000 M/G	
	Motorcycle	2008–present	Similar to current passenger base; "MOTORCYCLE" centered at bottom and "FEB" at bottom left	12345MB	24001MG to 89236MJ (as of October 2, 2021)	
	Special Registration	c. 1995–2008	Embossed blue serial on white plate with border line; "MINNESOTA" and "10,000 LAKES" centered at top and bottom respectively	WB1234		Issued to owners of vehicles in which DUI offenses are committed, while the vehicles' regular plates are impounded. Minnesota is one of only two states to issue such plates, the other being Ohio. Nicknamed "whiskey plates" because their serials start with 'W', and "whiskey" is this letter's code word in the NATO phonetic alphabet.
	Special Registration	2008–present	Screened black serial on white plate; "Minnesota" and "10,000 lakes" centered at top and bottom respectively	WB1234		Issued to owners of vehicles in which DUI offenses are committed, while the vehicles' regular plates are impounded. Minnesota is one of only two states to issue such plates, the other being Ohio. Nicknamed "whiskey plates" because their serials start with 'W', and "whiskey" is this letter's code word in the NATO phonetic alphabet.
	Truck	1997–2008	Embossed blue serial on white plate; "MINNESOTA" and "10,000 LAKES" centered at top and bottom respectively; weight class sticker at right	Y/B C1234	Y/A A0001 to approximately Y/B A8000	
	Truck	2008–present	As current passenger base; "FEB" at bottom left and weight class sticker at right	YBC1234	YBB0001 to YCD4180 (as of March 1, 2023)	
