= Vehicle registration plates of the United States for 1902 =

1902 license plates in the United States

Vehicle registration plates of the United States by year
Vehicle registration plates of the United States for 1901	Events of 1902	Vehicle registration plates of the United States for 1903

At this early point in the history of license plates in the United States of America, none of the 45 states, territories, or the District of Columbia, was issuing its own plates. The State of New York remained the only state that required vehicle owners to register their automobiles. The system of using the owner's initials as the registration number, begun in 1901, remained in effect. This would change in 1903 when a number was assigned to each owner to display on their vehicle. Across the country the increases in the number of automobiles was being noticed, and there were many cities, like Chicago, that had already begun to require their owners to register their vehicles.

== Passenger baseplates ==
In the table below, a light green background indicates that the owner of the vehicle was required to provide their own license plates. These plates are called "prestate" by most collectors. In the prestate era many states only provided the license plate number on a small disc or on paper, and the owner was required to have their license plate(s) made. These early license plates were created from kits that could be purchased at a hardware store, may have been available from automobile clubs or associations, they were forged by blacksmiths or other tradesmen, or the owner may have made their own plate with whatever materials they had on hand. Prestate plates were made from a variety of materials, but most often were made of leather, steel, or wood.

Legend:	Regular state issue plate(s)	Prestate era plate(s)	No plates issued by state or territory

Image	State	Design	Slogan	Serial format	Serials issued	Notes
	New York	Owner's initials	None	AB or ABC	None	Registrations continued from 1901 and were numbered 955 to 2036 (1082 registrations issued).

== State registrations ==
The following chart shows the year each U.S. state, territory, and the District of Columbia began to require license plates (prestate) and when they started to provide license plates. In some cases locations did not issue any prestate plates or no prestate plates are known, and this is indicated by the table cell not having a date. Clicking on a state name or a year in the table will take you to those articles.

First Year of License Plates
State	Prestate year	First year	State	Prestate year	First year
Alabama		1911	Montana	1913	1915
Alaska		1921	Nebraska	1905	1915
American Samoa		1924	Nevada	1913	1916
Arizona	1912	1914	New Hampshire		1905
Arkansas		1911	New Jersey	1903	1908
California	1905	1914	New Mexico	1905	1912
Canal Zone		1910	New York	1901	1910
Colorado		1913	North Carolina	1909	1913
Connecticut	1903	1905	North Dakota		1911
Delaware	1905	1908	Northern Mariana Islands		1944
District of Columbia	1903	1907	Ohio		1908
Florida	1905	1918	Oklahoma		1915
Georgia		1910	Oregon	1905	1911
Guam		1916	Pennsylvania	1903	1906
Hawaii		1922	Puerto Rico		1912
Idaho		1913	Rhode Island		1904
Illinois	1907	1911	South Carolina		1917
Indiana	1905	1913	South Dakota	1905	1913
Iowa	1904	1911	Tennessee	1905	1915
Kansas		1913	Texas		1917
Kentucky		1910	U.S. Virgin Islands		1917
Louisiana		1915	Utah	1909	1915
Maine		1905	Vermont		1905
Maryland	1904	1910	Virginia		1906
Massachusetts		1903	Washington	1906	1915
Michigan	1905	1910	West Virginia		1905
Minnesota	1903	1909	Wisconsin		1905
Mississippi		1912	Wyoming		1913
Missouri	1907	1911			

== See also ==
- Antique vehicle registration
- Electronic license plate
- Motor vehicle registration
- Vehicle license
