= Vehicle registration plates of the United States for 1901 =

1901 license plates in the United States

Vehicle registration plates of the United States by year
Vehicle registration plates of the United States for 1900	Events of 1901	Vehicle registration plates of the United States for 1902

At this early point in the history of license plates in the United States of America, none of the 45 states, territories, or the District of Columbia, was issuing its own plates. In this year New York became the first state to require vehicle owners to register their vehicles. The owners of these early New York vehicles had to provide their own license plates with only their initials on them. Plates were often made of metal letters on a thick leather background or on a steel base. This system of using the owners initials lasted until 1903 when a change to using a number provided by the state began.

While New York may have been the first state to require license plates for their vehicles, there were already cities that required plates. The city of Chicago passed an ordinance in 1899 that required their owners to pass a health test, an oral test, demonstrate their capability to operate the type of vehicle they owned, such as gasoline, steam, or electric, and mandated that the owners place a registration number issued by the city on the back of their vehicle. While this Chicago ordinance took effect in 1899, the first tests were not held until February 17, 1900.

== Passenger baseplates ==
In the table below, a light green background indicates that the owner of the vehicle was required to provide their own license plates. These plates are called "prestate" by most collectors. In the prestate era many states only provided the license plate number on a small disc or on paper, and the owner was required to have their license plate(s) made. These early license plates were created from kits that could be purchased at a hardware store, may have been available from automobile clubs or associations, they were forged by blacksmiths or other tradesmen, or the owner may have made their own plate with whatever materials they had on hand. Prestate plates were made from a variety of materials, but most often were made of leather, steel, or wood. The prestate era officially ended in 1918 when the state of Florida began to officially issue license plates.

Legend:	Prestate era plate(s)	No plates issued by state or territory

Image	State	Design	Slogan	Serial format	Serials issued	Notes
	Alabama					
	Alaska					
	American Samoa					
	Arizona					
	Arkansas					
	California					
	Colorado					
	Connecticut					
	Delaware					
	District of Columbia					
	Florida					
	Georgia					
	Guam					
	Hawai'i					
	Idaho					
	Illinois					
	Indiana					
	Iowa					
	Kansas					
	Kentucky					
	Louisiana					
	Maine					
	Maryland					
	Massachusetts					
	Michigan					
	Minnesota					
	Mississippi					
	Missouri					
	Montana					
	Nebraska					
	Nevada					
	New Hampshire					
	New Jersey					
	New Mexico					
	New York	Owner's initials	None	AB or ABC	None	Registrations were numbered 1 to 954, but the number did not appear on the license plate.
	North Carolina					
	North Dakota					
	Northern Mariana; Islands					
	Ohio					
	Oklahoma					
	Oregon					
	Pennsylvania					
	Puerto Rico					
	Rhode Island					
	South Carolina					
	South Dakota					
	Tennessee					
	Texas					
	Utah					
	Vermont					
	Virginia					
	Washington					
	West Virginia					
	Wisconsin					
	Wyoming					

== State registrations ==
The following chart shows the year each U.S. state, territory, and the District of Columbia began to require license plates (prestate) and when they started to provide license plates. In some cases locations did not issue any prestate plates or no prestate plates are known, and this is indicated by the table cell not having a date. Clicking on a state name or a year in the table will take you to those articles.

First Year of License Plates
State	Prestate year	First year	State	Prestate year	First year
Alabama		1911	Montana	1913	1915
Alaska		1921	Nebraska	1905	1915
American Samoa		1924	Nevada	1913	1916
Arizona	1912	1914	New Hampshire		1905
Arkansas		1911	New Jersey	1903	1908
California	1905	1914	New Mexico	1905	1912
Canal Zone		1910	New York	1901	1910
Colorado		1913	North Carolina	1909	1913
Connecticut	1903	1905	North Dakota		1911
Delaware	1905	1908	Northern Mariana Islands		1944
District of Columbia	1903	1907	Ohio		1908
Florida	1905	1918	Oklahoma		1915
Georgia		1910	Oregon	1905	1911
Guam		1916	Pennsylvania	1903	1906
Hawaii		1922	Puerto Rico		1912
Idaho		1913	Rhode Island		1904
Illinois	1907	1911	South Carolina		1917
Indiana	1905	1913	South Dakota	1905	1913
Iowa	1904	1911	Tennessee	1905	1915
Kansas		1913	Texas		1917
Kentucky		1910	U.S. Virgin Islands		1917
Louisiana		1915	Utah	1909	1915
Maine		1905	Vermont		1905
Maryland	1904	1910	Virginia		1906
Massachusetts		1903	Washington	1906	1915
Michigan	1905	1910	West Virginia		1905
Minnesota	1903	1909	Wisconsin		1905
Mississippi		1912	Wyoming		1913
Missouri	1907	1911			

== See also ==
- Antique vehicle registration
- Electronic license plate
- Motor vehicle registration
- Vehicle license
