= Vehicle registration plates of the United States for 1905 =

1905 license plates in the United States

Vehicle registration plates of the United States by year
Vehicle registration plates of the United States for 1904	Events of 1905	Vehicle registration plates of the United States for 1906

In 1905 the states of Connecticut, Maine, New Hampshire, Vermont, and West Virginia all began to issue their own license plates. The prestate era of plates began in the states of California, Delaware, Florida, Indiana, Michigan, Nebraska, New Mexico, Oregon, South Dakota, Tennessee. This year saw the most changes during the prestate era. Eight states were now issuing plates and another 17 required their owners to provide their own plates.

== Passenger baseplates ==
In the table below, a light green background indicates that the owner of the vehicle was required to provide their own license plates. These plates are called "prestate" by most collectors. In the prestate era many states only provided the license plate number on a small disc or on paper, and the owner was required to have their license plate(s) made. These early license plates were created from kits that could be purchased at a hardware store, may have been available from automobile clubs or associations, they were forged by blacksmiths or other tradesmen, or the owner may have made their own plate with whatever materials they had on hand. Prestate plates were made from a variety of materials, but most often were made of leather, steel, or wood.

Legend:	Regular state issue plate(s)	Prestate era plate(s)	No plates issued by state or territory

Image	State	Design	Slogan	Serial format	Serials issued	Notes
	Alabama					No prestate plates. State issued plates begin in 1911.
	Alaska					No prestate plates. State issued plates begin in 1921.
	American Samoa					No prestate plates. Territory issued plates begin in 1924.
	Arizona					No prestate plates. State issued plates begin in 1914.
	Arkansas					No prestate plates. State issued plates begin in 1911.
	California					First year for prestate plates. State issued plates begin in 1914.
	Canal Zone					No prestate plates. State issued plates begin in 1910.
	Colorado					No prestate plates. State issued plates begin in 1913.
	Connecticut					First year for state issued plates.
	Delaware					First year for prestate plates. State issued plates begin in 1908.
	District of Columbia					District issued plates begin in 1907.
	Florida					First year for prestate plates. State issued plates begin in 1918.
	Georgia					No prestate plates. State issued plates begin in 1910.
	Guam					No prestate plates. Territory issued plates begin in 1916.
	Hawai'i					No prestate plates. Territory issued plates begin in 1922.
	Idaho					No prestate plates. State issued plates begin in 1913.
	Illinois					Prestate plates start in 1907. State issued plates begin in 1911.
	Indiana					First year for prestate plates. State issued plates begin in 1913.
	Iowa					State issued plates begin in 1911.
	Kansas					No prestate plates. State issued plates begin in 1913.
	Kentucky					No prestate plates. State issued plates begin in 1910.
	Louisiana					No prestate plates. State issued plates begin in 1915.
	Maine					First year for state issued plates.
	Maryland					State issued plates begin in 1910.
	Massachusetts					
	Michigan					First year for prestate plates. State issued plates begin in 1910.
	Minnesota					State issued plates begin in 1909.
	Mississippi					No prestate plates. State issued plates begin in 1912.
	Missouri					Prestate plates start in 1907. State issued plates begin in 1911.
	Montana					Prestate plates start in 1913. State issued plates begin in 1915.
	Nebraska	Prestate plate provided by owner with house number mounted on leather	None	1234		First year for prestate plates. State issued plates begin in 1915.
	Nevada					Prestate plates start in 1913. State issued plates begin in 1916.
	New Hampshire					First year for state issued plates.
	New Jersey					State issued plates begin in 1908.
	New Mexico					First year for prestate plates. State issued plates begin in 1912.
	New York					State issued plates begin in 1910.
	North Carolina					Prestate plates start in 1909. State issued plates begin in 1913.
	North Dakota					No prestate plates. State issued plates begin in 1911.
	Northern Mariana; Islands					No prestate plates. Territory issued plates begin in 1944.
	Ohio					No prestate plates. State issued plates begin in 1908.
	Oklahoma					No prestate plates. State issued plates begin in 1915.
	Oregon					First year for prestate plates. State issued plates begin in 1911.
	Pennsylvania					State issued plates begin in 1906.
	Puerto Rico					No prestate plates. Territory issued plates begin in 1912.
	Rhode Island					
	South Carolina					No prestate plates. State issued plates begin in 1917.
	South Dakota					First year for prestate plates. State issued plates begin in 1913.
	Tennessee					First year for prestate plates. State issued plates begin in 1915.
	Texas					No prestate plates. State issued plates begin in 1917.
	U.S. Virgin Islands					No prestate plates. Territory issued plates begin in 1917.
	Utah					Prestate plates start in 1909. State issued plates begin in 1915.
	Vermont					First year for state issued plates.
	Virginia					No prestate plates.State issued plates begin in 1906.
	Washington					Prestate plates start in 1906. State issued plates begin in 1915.
	West Virginia					First year for state issued plates.
	Wisconsin	Riveted aluminum serial on black zinc plate	none	1234-W	1-W to 1492-W	First year for state issued plates. Photo shows the 32nd license plate issued in the state. Serial ranges shown are plates issued in 1905.
	Wyoming					No prestate plates. State issued plates begin in 1913.

== See also ==
- Antique vehicle registration
- Electronic license plate
- Motor vehicle registration
- Vehicle license
