= Vehicle registration plates of the United States for 1908 =

1908 license plates in the United States

Vehicle registration plates of the United States by year
Vehicle registration plates of the United States for 1907	Events of 1908	Vehicle registration plates of the United States for 1909

In 1908 Delaware, New Jersey and Ohio joined the list of states and territories providing license plates to vehicle owners, and no new states entered the prestate era. There were now 14 states and territories that were issuing license plates and 16 other states requiring owners to provide their own license plates.

== Passenger baseplates ==
In the table below, a light green background indicates that the owner of the vehicle was required to provide their own license plates. These plates are called "prestate" by most collectors. In the prestate era many states only provided the license plate number on a small disc or on paper, and the owner was required to have their license plate(s) made. These early license plates were created from kits that could be purchased at a hardware store, may have been available from automobile clubs or associations, they were forged by blacksmiths or other tradesmen, or the owner may have made their own plate with whatever materials they had on hand. Prestate plates were made from a variety of materials, but most often were made of leather, steel, or wood.

Legend:	Regular state issue plate(s)	Prestate era plate(s)	No plates issued by state or territory

Image	State	Design	Slogan	Serial format	Serials issued	Notes
	Alabama					No prestate plates. State issued plates begin in 1911.
	Alaska					No prestate plates. State issued plates begin in 1921.
	American Samoa					No prestate plates. Territory issued plates begin in 1924.
	Arizona					No prestate plates. State issued plates begin in 1914.
	Arkansas					No prestate plates. State issued plates begin in 1911.
	California					State issued plates begin in 1914.
	Canal Zone					No prestate plates. State issued plates begin in 1910.
	Colorado					No prestate plates. State issued plates begin in 1913.
	Connecticut					
	Delaware					First year for state issued plates.
	District of Columbia					
	Florida					State issued plates begin in 1918.
	Georgia					No prestate plates. State issued plates begin in 1910.
	Guam					No prestate plates. Territory issued plates begin in 1916.
	Hawai'i					No prestate plates. Territory issued plates begin in 1922.
	Idaho					No prestate plates. State issued plates begin in 1913.
	Illinois					State issued plates begin in 1911.
	Indiana					State issued plates begin in 1913.
	Iowa					State issued plates begin in 1911.
	Kansas					No prestate plates. State issued plates begin in 1913.
	Kentucky					No prestate plates. State issued plates begin in 1910.
	Louisiana					No prestate plates. State issued plates begin in 1915.
	Maine					
	Maryland					State issued plates begin in 1910.
	Massachusetts					
	Michigan					State issued plates begin in 1910.
	Minnesota					Last year for prestate plates. State issued plates begin in 1909.
	Mississippi					No prestate plates. State issued plates begin in 1912.
	Missouri					State issued plates begin in 1911.
	Montana					Prestate plates start in 1913. State issued plates begin in 1915.
	Nebraska	Prestate owner provided plate with house numbers on leather	None	12345		State issued plates begin in 1915.
	Nevada					Prestate plates start in 1913. State issued plates begin in 1916.
	New Hampshire					
	New Jersey					First year for state issued plates.
	New Mexico					State issued plates begin in 1912.
	New York					State issued plates begin in 1910.
	North Carolina					Prestate plates start in 1909. State issued plates begin in 1913.
	North Dakota					No prestate plates. State issued plates begin in 1911.
	Northern Mariana; Islands					No prestate plates. Territory issued plates begin in 1944.
	Ohio					First year for state issued plates.
	Oklahoma					No prestate plates. State issued plates begin in 1915.
	Oregon					State issued plates begin in 1911.
	Pennsylvania					
	Puerto Rico					No prestate plates. Territory issued plates begin in 1912.
	Rhode Island					
	South Carolina					No prestate plates. State issued plates begin in 1917.
	South Dakota					State issued plates begin in 1913.
	Tennessee					State issued plates begin in 1915.
	Texas					No prestate plates. State issued plates begin in 1917.
	U.S. Virgin Islands					No prestate plates. Territory issued plates begin in 1917.
	Utah					Prestate plates start in 1909. State issued plates begin in 1915.
	Vermont					
	Virginia					
	Washington					State issued plates begin in 1915.
	West Virginia					
	Wisconsin	Riveted aluminum serial on black zinc plate	none	1234-W	4148-W to 6192-W	Issued July 1905 to August 1911; replaced in 1912. Serials issued show plates issued in 1908.
	Wyoming					No prestate plates. State issued plates begin in 1913.

== See also ==
- Antique vehicle registration
- Electronic license plate
- Motor vehicle registration
- Vehicle license
