= Vehicle registration plates of the United States for 1911 =

1911 license plates in the United States

Vehicle registration plates of the United States by year
Vehicle registration plates of the United States for 1910	Events of 1911	Vehicle registration plates of the United States for 1912

In 1911 Alabama, Arkansas, Illinois, Iowa, Missouri, North Dakota, and Oregon joined the list of states and territories providing license plates to vehicle owners, and no new states entered the prestate era. There were now 26 states and 2 territories that were issuing license plates and 10 other states requiring owners to provide their own license plates.

== Passenger baseplates ==
In the table below, a light green background indicates that the owner of the vehicle was required to provide their own license plates. These plates are called "prestate" by most collectors. In the prestate era many states only provided the license plate number on a small disc or on paper, and the owner was required to have their license plate(s) made. These early license plates were created from kits that could be purchased at a hardware store, may have been available from automobile clubs or associations, they were forged by blacksmiths or other tradesmen, or the owner may have made their own plate with whatever materials they had on hand. Prestate plates were made from a variety of materials, but most often were made of leather, steel, or wood.

Legend:	Regular state issue plate(s)	Prestate era plate(s)	No plates issued by state or territory

Image	State	Design	Slogan	Serial format	Serials issued	Notes
	Alabama					Plates were valid from October 1, 1911, to September 30, 1912. See the 1912 entry for these plates. This plate registration system continued through 1975–76.
	Alaska					No prestate plates. State issued plates begin in 1921.
	American Samoa					No prestate plates. Territory issued plates begin in 1924.
	Arizona					No prestate plates. State issued plates begin in 1914.
	Arkansas	Black serial on white porcelain plate with border line; vertical "ARK" and "1911" at left and right respectively	none	1234	1 to about 1600	First year for state issued plates.
	California	Black serial on white and many variations	none	12345	New plates numbered 30478 to 61784	Plates 1 - 30477 still valid; This plate number was issued during August 1911. State issued plates begin in 1914.
	Canal Zone					
	Colorado					No prestate plates. State issued plates begin in 1913.
	Connecticut	Blue serial number on white porcelain plate	none	C12345	C1 to about C14000	
	Delaware	White numbers on dark blue porcelain; "DEL. 1911" at top	none	1234	1 to about 1500	
	District of Columbia	White numbers on black porcelain plate; "DISTRICT OF COLUMBIA" at top	none	12345	Previous issues plus 6273 - 9289	Not all were issued with some blocks of numbers possibly reserved for motorcycles
	Florida	Owner provided white numbers on black plate	none	12345		State issued plates begin in 1918.
	Georgia	Black numbers on bare aluminum base	none	12345	1 to about 10000	Rolled edges and individual numbers slide into plate; valid until 1913
	Guam					No prestate plates. Territory issued plates begin in 1916.
	Hawai'i					No prestate plates. Territory issued plates begin in 1922.
	Idaho					No prestate plates. State issued plates begin in 1913.
	Illinois	Black on white; vertical "ILL" at right	none	12345	1 to about 38269	First year for state issued plates. No year on plates; two plates (pairs) issued for each vehicle.
	Indiana					State issued plates begin in 1913.
	Iowa	Embossed white serial number on dark blue plate with border line; "IA 1911" at right	none	12345	2001 to about 29900	First year for state issued plates.
	Kansas					No prestate plates. State issued plates begin in 1913.
	Kentucky	White serial number on black porcelain plate; vertical "KY" at right side with circle containing 'B' below	none	1234	1 to about 3200	Two plates (pairs) issued for each vehicle
	Louisiana					No prestate plates. State issued plates begin in 1915.
	Maine	White serial number on red porcelain plate; "MAINE" centered at bottom	none	12345	1 to about 10050	Manufacturing date code on back of some plates; multiple variations known
	Maryland	White numbers on black porcelain plate; large "MD" over "1911" at right	none	1234	1000 to about 8050	
	Massachusetts	White serial number on blue porcelain plate; vertical "MASS" at left; vertical "1911" at right	none	12345	1 to about 32800	Two plates (pairs) issued for each vehicle
	Michigan	White serial numbers on black porcelain plate; state seal at top left with "MICH" over "1911" below	none	12345	1 to about 27550	Plates ending in the letter "M" are dealer or manufacturer plates; two plates (pairs) issued for each vehicle
	Minnesota	White serial numbers on dark blue porcelain plate; vertical "MINN" at left and vertical "1911" at right	none	12345	1 to about 19550	Two plates (pairs) issued for each vehicle
	Mississippi					No prestate plates. State issued plates begin in 1912.
	Missouri	Embossed unpainted aluminum numbers on yellow plate; "MISSOURI 1911" at bottom	none	12345	1 to about 16200	First year for state issued plates. Paint on numbers was buffed off to expose aluminum below
	Montana					Prestate plates start in 1913. State issued plates begin in 1915.
	Nebraska	Prestate owner provided plate with white serial numbers on black background	none	12345	1 to about 64000(?)	State issued plates begin in 1915. As with most prestate license plates, there is a large variation in the plates created
	Nevada					Prestate plates start in 1913. State issued plates begin in 1916.
	New Hampshire	White serial number on green porcelain plate; "N.H." centered at bottom	none	1234	1 to about 7250	Manufacturing date code on back of some plates; multiple variations known
	New Jersey	Red serial number on light gray porcelain plate; "NJ" over riveted state seal over "11" at right	none	12345	1 to about 38000	
	New Mexico					Last year for prestate plates. State issued plates begin in 1912.
	New York	Embossed white serial on maroon plate; vertical "NY" at right	none	12345	1 to about 81300	"M" prefix plates are dealer plates
	North Carolina	White serial numbers on black plate	none	1234	1 to about 7000	State issued plates begin in 1913. Black serial numbers on white plates were also authorized
	North Dakota	Light orange serial number on black plate; vertical "ND" at left and vertical "1911" at right	none	1234	1 to about 7000(?)	First year for state issued plates.
	Northern Mariana; Islands					No prestate plates. Territory issued plates begin in 1944.
	Ohio	Black serial number on white porcelain plate; vertical "OHIO" at left and vertical "1911" at right	none	12345	1 to about 46000	
	Oklahoma					No prestate plates. State issued plates begin in 1915.
	Oregon	Embossed black serial on yellow plate with border line; vertical "ORE" at left and vertical "1911" at right	none	1234	1 to about 6200	First year for state issued plates. Two plates (pairs) issued for each vehicle
	Pennsylvania	Black serial number on yellow porcelain; "PENNA" over aluminum riveted keystone seal over "1911" at left	none	12345	1 to about 43900	Beveled edge on higher numbered plates
	Puerto Rico					No prestate plates. Territory issued plates begin in 1912.
	Rhode Island	White serial numbers on black porcelain plate; "RI" at right	none	1234	1 to 7978	Some plates have a seriffed letter "I" in the "RI" state abbreviation
	South Carolina					No prestate plates. State issued plates begin in 1917.
	South Dakota	White serial numbers on black background	none	12345		State issued plates begin in 1913.
	Tennessee	Generally white serial numbers on black background, but the reverse coloring is also known to exist	none	12345		State issued plates begin in 1915.
	Texas	White serial numbers on black background	none	12345		No prestate plates. State issued plates begin in 1917.
	U.S. Virgin Islands					No prestate plates. Territory issued plates begin in 1917.
	Utah	Usually white serial numbers on black background	none	1234		State issued plates begin in 1915.
	Vermont	Black serial number on white porcelain plate with border line; large "VT." over smaller "1911" at right	none	1234	1 to about 3300	Holes with grommets at the four corners
	Virginia	White serial number on dark blue porcelain plate; "VA." over long dash symbol over "1911" at right	none	1234	1 to about 4000	
	Washington	White serial number on black background; "WN" at left of serial number	none	1234	1 to 11897	State issued plates begin in 1915.
	West Virginia	White serial number on dark blue porcelain plate; large "W" over "VA." over smaller 1910" at right; "LICENSED" centered at top between bolt slots	none	1234	1 to about 1700	Grommets at four corner bolt holes
	Wisconsin	Riveted aluminum serial number on black zinc plate	none	12345-W	15212-W to 21983-W	Issued only January through July; replaced in 1912.
	Wisconsin	Riveted aluminum serial number on dark green plate; vertical "1911" at left	none	1234W	1W to 1287W	Issued only for new registrations between August and December 1911
	Wyoming					No prestate plates. State issued plates begin in 1913.

== See also ==
- Antique vehicle registration
- Electronic license plate
- Motor vehicle registration
- Vehicle license
