= Vehicle registration plates of the United States for 1912 =

1912 license plates in the United States

Vehicle registration plates of the United States by year
| Vehicle registration plates of the United States for 1911 | Events of 1912 | Vehicle registration plates of the United States for 1913 |

In 1912 Mississippi, New Mexico, and Puerto Rico joined the list of states and territories providing license plates to vehicle owners, and no new states entered the prestate era. There were now 28 states and 3 territories that were issuing license plates and 9 other states requiring owners to provide their own license plates.

== Passenger baseplates ==
In the table below, a light green background indicates that the owner of the vehicle was required to provide their own license plates. These plates are called "prestate" by most collectors. In the prestate era many states only provided the license plate number on a small disc or on paper, and the owner was required to have their license plate(s) made. These early license plates were created from kits that could be purchased at a hardware store, may have been available from automobile clubs or associations, they were forged by blacksmiths or other tradesmen, or the owner may have made their own plate with whatever materials they had on hand. Prestate plates were made from a variety of materials, but most often were made of leather, steel, or wood.

| Legend: | Regular state issue plate(s) | Prestate era plate(s) | No plates issued by state or territory |

| Image | State | Design | Slogan | Serial format | Serials issued | Notes |
|---|---|---|---|---|---|---|
| | Alabama | | | | | |
| | Alaska | | | | | No prestate plates. State issued plates begin in 1921. |
| | American Samoa | | | | | No prestate plates. Territory issued plates begin in 1924. |
| | Arizona | | | | | No prestate plates. State issued plates begin in 1914. |
| | Arkansas | | | | | |
| | California | | | | | State issued plates begin in 1914. |
| | Canal Zone | | | | | |
| | Colorado | | | | | No prestate plates. State issued plates begin in 1913. |
| | Connecticut | | | | | |
| | Delaware | | | | | |
| | District of Columbia | | | | | |
| | Florida | | | | | State issued plates begin in 1918. |
| | Georgia | | | | | |
| | Guam | | | | | No prestate plates. Territory issued plates begin in 1916. |
| | Hawai'i | | | | | No prestate plates. Territory issued plates begin in 1922. |
| | Idaho | | | | | No prestate plates. State issued plates begin in 1913. |
| | Illinois | | | | | |
| | Indiana | | | | | Last year for prestate plates. State issued plates begin in 1913. |
| | Iowa | Embossed white serial on brown plate; "IA 19" at right | none | 123456 | 1 to approximately 362000 | |
| | Kansas | | | | | No prestate plates. State issued plates begin in 1913. |
| | Kentucky | | | | | |
| | Louisiana | | | | | No prestate plates. State issued plates begin in 1915. |
| | Maine | | | | | |
| | Maryland | Dark blue serial on white porcelain plate; "MD 1912" at right | none | 12345 | 1000 to approximately 11000 | |
| | Massachusetts | Dark blue serial on white porcelain plate; vertical "MASS" and "1912" at left and right, respectively | none | 12345 | 1 to approximately 41000 | |
| | Michigan | | | | | |
| | Minnesota | | | | | |
| | Mississippi | | | | | First year for state issued plates. |
| | Missouri | | | | | |
| | Montana | | | | | Prestate plates start in 1913. State issued plates begin in 1915. |
| | Nebraska | | | | | State issued plates begin in 1915. |
| | Nevada | | | | | Prestate plates start in 1913. State issued plates begin in 1916. |
| | New Hampshire | | | | | |
| | New Jersey | | | | | |
| | New Mexico | | | | | First year for state issued plates. |
| | New York | | | | | |
| | North Carolina | | | | | Last year for prestate plates. State issued plates begin in 1913. |
| | North Dakota | | | | | |
| | Northern Mariana; Islands | | | | | No prestate plates. Territory issued plates begin in 1944. |
| | Ohio | | | | | |
| | Oklahoma | | | | | No prestate plates. State issued plates begin in 1915. |
| | Oregon | | | | | |
| | Pennsylvania | | | | | |
| | Puerto Rico | | | | | First year for territory issued plates. |
| | Rhode Island | | | | | |
| | South Carolina | | | | | No prestate plates. State issued plates begin in 1917. |
| | South Dakota | | | | | Last year for prestate plates. State issued plates begin in 1913. |
| | Tennessee | | | | | State issued plates begin in 1915. |
| | Texas | | | | | No prestate plates. State issued plates begin in 1917. |
| | U.S. Virgin Islands | | | | | No prestate plates. Territory issued plates begin in 1917. |
| | Utah | | | | | State issued plates begin in 1915. |
| | Vermont | | | | | |
| | Virginia | | | | | |
| | Washington | | | | | State issued plates begin in 1915. |
| | West Virginia | | | | | |
| | Wisconsin | Riveted aluminum serial on red plate | none | 12345W | 1W to approximately 25000W | First reissue of all license plates. Last year of zinc plates. |
| | Wyoming | | | | | No prestate plates. State issued plates begin in 1913. |

== See also ==
- Antique vehicle registration
- Electronic license plate
- Motor vehicle registration
- Vehicle license
