= Vehicle registration plates of the United States for 1913 =

1913 license plates in the United States

Vehicle registration plates of the United States by year
Vehicle registration plates of the United States for 1912	Events of 1913	Vehicle registration plates of the United States for 1914

In 1913 Colorado, Idaho, Indiana, Kansas, North Carolina, South Dakota, and Wyoming joined the list of states and territories providing license plates to vehicle owners, and Montana and Nevada entered the prestate era. There were now 35 states and 3 territories that were issuing license plates and 8 other states requiring owners to provide their own license plates.

== Passenger baseplates ==
In the table below, a light green background indicates that the owner of the vehicle was required to provide their own license plates. These plates are called "prestate" by most collectors. In the prestate era many states only provided the license plate number on a small disc or on paper, and the owner was required to have their license plate(s) made. These early license plates were created from kits that could be purchased at a hardware store, may have been available from automobile clubs or associations, they were forged by blacksmiths or other tradesmen, or the owner may have made their own plate with whatever materials they had on hand. Prestate plates were made from a variety of materials, but most often were made of leather, steel, or wood.

Legend:	Regular state issue plate(s)	Prestate era plate(s)	No plates issued by state or territory

Image	State	Design	Slogan	Serial format	Serials issued	Notes
	Alabama					
	Alaska					No prestate plates. State issued plates begin in 1921.
	American Samoa					No prestate plates. Territory issued plates begin in 1924.
	Arizona					No prestate plates. State issued plates begin in 1914.
	Arkansas					
	California					Last year for prestate plates. State issued plates begin in 1914.
	Canal Zone					
	Colorado					First year for state issued plates.
	Connecticut					
	Delaware					
	District of Columbia					
	Florida					State issued plates begin in 1918.
	Georgia					
	Guam					No prestate plates. Territory issued plates begin in 1916.
	Hawai'i					No prestate plates. Territory issued plates begin in 1922.
	Idaho					First year for state issued plates.
	Illinois					
	Indiana					First year for state issued plates.
	Iowa					
	Kansas					First year for state issued plates.
	Kentucky					
	Louisiana					No prestate plates. State issued plates begin in 1915.
	Maine					
	Maryland					
	Massachusetts					
	Michigan					
	Minnesota					
	Mississippi					
	Missouri					
	Montana					First year for prestate plates. State issued plates begin in 1915.
	Nebraska	Prestate plate made by owner with house numbers mounted on leather	None	12345		State issued plates begin in 1915.
	Nevada					First year for prestate plates. State issued plates begin in 1916.
	New Hampshire					
	New Jersey					
	New Mexico					
	New York					
	North Carolina					First year for state issued plates.
	North Dakota					
	Northern Mariana; Islands					No prestate plates. Territory issued plates begin in 1944.
	Ohio					
	Oklahoma					No prestate plates. State issued plates begin in 1915.
	Oregon					
	Pennsylvania					
	Puerto Rico					
	Rhode Island					
	South Carolina					No prestate plates. State issued plates begin in 1917.
	South Dakota					First year for state issued plates.
	Tennessee					State issued plates begin in 1915.
	Texas					No prestate plates. State issued plates begin in 1917.
	U.S. Virgin Islands					No prestate plates. Territory issued plates begin in 1917.
	Utah					State issued plates begin in 1915.
	Vermont					
	Virginia					
	Washington					State issued plates begin in 1915.
	West Virginia					
	Wisconsin	Riveted aluminum serial on dark blue plate	none	12345W	1W to approximately 35000W	Last year of riveted plates.
	Wyoming					First year for state issued plates.

== See also ==
- Antique vehicle registration
- Electronic license plate
- Motor vehicle registration
- Vehicle license
