= Vehicle registration plates of the United States for 1914 =

1914 license plates in the United States

Vehicle registration plates of the United States by year
Vehicle registration plates of the United States for 1913	Events of 1914	Vehicle registration plates of the United States for 1915

In 1914 Arizona and California joined the list of states and territories providing license plates to vehicle owners, and no new states entered the prestate era. There were now 37 states and 3 territories that were issuing license plates and 7 other states requiring owners to provide their own license plates.

== Passenger baseplates ==
In the table below, a light green background indicates that the owner of the vehicle was required to provide their own license plates. These plates are called "prestate" by most collectors. In the prestate era many states only provided the license plate number on a small disc or on paper, and the owner was required to have their license plate(s) made. These early license plates were created from kits that could be purchased at a hardware store, may have been available from automobile clubs or associations, they were forged by blacksmiths or other tradesmen, or the owner may have made their own plate with whatever materials they had on hand. Prestate plates were made from a variety of materials, but most often were made of leather, steel, or wood.

Legend:	Regular state issue plate(s)	Prestate era plate(s)	No plates issued by state or territory

Image	State	Design	Slogan	Serial format	Serials issued	Notes
	Alabama					
	Alaska					No prestate plates. State issued plates begin in 1921.
	American Samoa					No prestate plates. Territory issued plates begin in 1924.
	Arizona					First year for state issued plates.
	Arkansas					
	California					First year for state issued plates.
	Canal Zone					
	Colorado					
	Connecticut					
	Delaware					
	District of Columbia					
	Florida					State issued plates begin in 1918.
	Georgia					
	Guam					No prestate plates. Territory issued plates begin in 1916.
	Hawai'i					No prestate plates. Territory issued plates begin in 1922.
	Idaho					
	Illinois					
	Indiana					
	Iowa					
	Kansas					
	Kentucky	White serial numbers on black porcelain plate; "K" over "Y" over diamond symbol with a letter "G' in the center all at right; red lines across top and bottom of plate	none			
	Kentucky	Embossed black serial numbers on white base; large "KY" over "1914" at right	none			Issued only to new registrants and those whose plates expired before the end of 1914.
	Louisiana					No prestate plates. State issued plates begin in 1915.
	Maine					
	Maryland					
	Massachusetts					
	Michigan					
	Minnesota					
	Mississippi					
	Missouri					
	Montana					Last year for prestate plates. State issued plates begin in 1915.
	Nebraska	Prestate owner provided plate with house numbers on leather	None	12345		Last year for prestate plates. State issued plates begin in 1915.
	Nevada					State issued plates begin in 1916.
	New Hampshire					
	New Jersey					
	New Mexico					
	New York					
	North Carolina					
	North Dakota					
	Northern Mariana; Islands					No prestate plates. Territory issued plates begin in 1944.
	Ohio					
	Oklahoma					No prestate plates. State issued plates begin in 1915.
	Oregon					
	Pennsylvania					
	Puerto Rico					
	Rhode Island					
	South Carolina					No prestate plates. State issued plates begin in 1917.
	South Dakota					
	Tennessee					Last year for prestate plates. State issued plates begin in 1915.
	Texas					No prestate plates. State issued plates begin in 1917.
	U.S. Virgin Islands					No prestate plates. Territory issued plates begin in 1917.
	Utah					Final year for prestate plates. State issued plates begin in 1915.
	Vermont					
	Virginia					
	Washington					Last year for prestate plates. State issued plates begin in 1915.
	West Virginia					
	Wisconsin	Embossed black serial on white plate with a vertical "1914" date at left	none	12345W	1W to approximately 54000W	First year to use embossed metal.
	Wyoming					The round state seal is missing above the letters "WYO" in this photograph.

== See also ==
- Antique vehicle registration
- Electronic license plate
- Motor vehicle registration
- Vehicle license
