= Vehicle registration plates of the United States for 1915 =

1915 license plates in the United States

Vehicle registration plates of the United States by year
Vehicle registration plates of the United States for 1914	Events of 1915	Vehicle registration plates of the United States for 1916

In 1915 Louisiana, Montana, Nebraska, Oklahoma, Tennessee, Utah, and Washington joined the list of states and territories providing license plates to vehicle owners, and no new states entered the prestate era. There were now 44 states and 3 territories that were issuing license plates and 2 other states requiring owners to provide their own license plates.

== Passenger baseplates ==
In the table below, a light green background indicates that the owner of the vehicle was required to provide their own license plates. These plates are called "prestate" by most collectors. In the prestate era many states only provided the license plate number on a small disc or on paper, and the owner was required to have their license plate(s) made. These early license plates were created from kits that could be purchased at a hardware store, may have been available from automobile clubs or associations, they were forged by blacksmiths or other tradesmen, or the owner may have made their own plate with whatever materials they had on hand. Prestate plates were made from a variety of materials, but most often were made of leather, steel, or wood.

Legend:	Regular state issue plate(s)	Prestate era plate(s)	No plates issued by state or territory

Image	State	Design	Slogan	Serial format	Serials issued	Notes
	Alabama					
	Alaska					No prestate plates. State issued plates begin in 1921.
	American Samoa					No prestate plates. Territory issued plates begin in 1924.
	Arizona					
	Arkansas					
	California	Black serial on yellow porcelain, "CAL" and "1915" on left and right, respective places.				
	Canal Zone					
	Colorado					
	Connecticut					
	Delaware					
	District of Columbia					
	Florida					State issued plates begin in 1918.
	Georgia					
	Guam					No prestate plates. Territory issued plates begin in 1916.
	Hawai'i					No prestate plates. Territory issued plates begin in 1922.
	Idaho					
	Illinois					Front plate has slots between the serial numbers to allow better radiator ventilation.
	Indiana					
	Iowa	Emobossed black text on yellow background				
	Kansas					
	Kentucky					
	Louisiana	Louisiana's first license plate was a white serial, "LA", and "1915" on a midnight blue porcelain plate.	none			First year for state issued plates.
	Maine					
	Maryland					
	Massachusetts					
	Michigan					
	Minnesota					
	Mississippi					
	Missouri	Bmbossed black serial on green plate, stacked "MO" and "1915" on right side				
	Montana					First year for state issued plates.
	Nebraska					First year for state issued plates.
	Nevada					Last year for prestate plates. State issued plates begin in 1916.
	New Hampshire					
	New Jersey					
	New Mexico					
	New York					
	North Carolina		Expires June 30-15			
	North Dakota					
	Northern Mariana; Islands					No prestate plates. Territory issued plates begin in 1944.
	Ohio					
	Oklahoma					First year for state issued plates.
	Oregon					
	Pennsylvania					
	Puerto Rico					
	Rhode Island					
	South Carolina					No prestate plates. State issued plates begin in 1917.
	South Dakota					
	Tennessee					First year for state issued plates.
	Texas					No prestate plates. State issued plates begin in 1917.
	U.S. Virgin Islands					No prestate plates. Territory issued plates begin in 1917.
	Utah					First year for state issued plates.
	Vermont					
	Virginia					
	Washington					First year for state plates.
	West Virginia					
	Wisconsin	Embossed white serial on black plate; "W" and "15" embossed at right	none	12345	1 to approximately 80000	
	Wyoming					

== See also ==
- Antique vehicle registration
- Electronic license plate
- Motor vehicle registration
- Vehicle license
