= Vehicle registration plates of the United States for 1917 =

1917 license plates in the United States

Vehicle registration plates of the United States by year
Vehicle registration plates of the United States for 1916	Events of 1917	Vehicle registration plates of the United States for 1918

In 1917 South Carolina, Texas, and the U.S. Virgin Islands joined the list of states and territories providing license plates to vehicle owners, and no new states entered the prestate era. There were now 47 states and 5 territories that were issuing license plates and 1 other state requiring owners to provide their own license plates.

== Passenger baseplates ==
In the table below, a light green background indicates that the owner of the vehicle was required to provide their own license plates. These plates are called "prestate" by most collectors. In the prestate era many states only provided the license plate number on a small disc or on paper, and the owner was required to have their license plate(s) made. These early license plates were created from kits that could be purchased at a hardware store, may have been available from automobile clubs or associations, they were forged by blacksmiths or other tradesmen, or the owner may have made their own plate with whatever materials they had on hand. Prestate plates were made from a variety of materials, but most often were made of leather, steel, or wood. This was the last year for prestate plates, but note that territories, like Alaska and Hawaii, etc., did not officially issue plates until several years later.

Legend:	Regular state issue plate(s)	Prestate era plate(s)	No plates issued by state or territory

Image	State	Design	Slogan	Serial format	Serials issued	Notes
	Alabama					
	Alaska					No prestate plates. State issued plates begin in 1921.
	American Samoa					No prestate plates. Territory issued plates begin in 1924.
	Arizona					
	Arkansas					
	California					
	Canal Zone					
	Colorado					
	Connecticut					
	Delaware					
	District of Columbia					
	Florida					Last year for prestate plates. State issued plates begin in 1918.
	Georgia					
	Guam					
	Hawai'i					No prestate plates. Territory issued plates begin in 1922.
	Idaho					
	Illinois					
	Indiana					
	Iowa	Embossed beige serial on dark olive green plate; "IA" and dash at right	none	123456	1 to approximately 341000	Used until 1918 due to metal conservation for World War I.
	Kansas					
	Kentucky					
	Louisiana					
	Maine					
	Maryland					
	Massachusetts					
	Michigan					
	Minnesota					
	Mississippi					
	Missouri					
	Montana					
	Nebraska					
	Nevada					
	New Hampshire					
	New Jersey					
	New Mexico					
	New York					
	North Carolina					
	North Dakota					
	Northern Mariana; Islands					No prestate plates. Territory issued plates begin in 1944.
	Ohio	Black serial on yellow porcelain plate, vertical "OHIO" and "1917" on left and right, respectively.				
	Oklahoma					
	Oregon					
	Pennsylvania					
	Puerto Rico					
	Rhode Island					
	South Carolina					First year for state issued plates.
	South Dakota					
	Tennessee					
	Texas					First year for state issued plates. Validated with separate round seal.
	U.S. Virgin Islands					First year for territory issued license plates.
	Utah					
	Vermont					
	Virginia					
	Washington					
	West Virginia					
	Wisconsin	Embossed white serial on dark green plate; vertical "WIS." and "'17." at right.	none	123456	1 to approximately 165000	
	Wyoming					

== See also ==
- Antique vehicle registration
- Electronic license plate
- Motor vehicle registration
- Vehicle license
