= Vehicle registration plates of the United States for 1918 =

1918 license plates in the United States

Vehicle registration plates of the United States by year
Vehicle registration plates of the United States for 1917	Events of 1918	Vehicle registration plates of the United States for 1919

In 1918, Florida joined the list of states and territories providing license plates to vehicle owners, and no new states entered the prestate era. There were now 48 states and 5 territories that were issuing license plates. The prestate era ended when Florida began to issue license plates.

== Passenger baseplates ==
Legend:	Regular state issue plate(s)	No plates issued by state or territory

Passenger Car Plates
Image	Region	Design	Slogan	Serial format	Serials issued	Notes
	Alabama					
	Alaska					No prestate plates. Territory issued plates begin in 1921.
	American Samoa					No prestate plates. Territory issued plates begin in 1924.
	Arizona					
	Arkansas					
	California					
	Canal Zone					
	Colorado					
	Connecticut					
	Delaware					
	District of Columbia					
	Florida					First year for state issued plates.
	Georgia					
	Guam					
	Hawai'i					No prestate plates. Territory issued plates begin in 1922.
	Idaho					
	Illinois					
	Indiana					
	Iowa					
	Kansas					
	Kentucky					
	Louisiana					
	Maine					
	Maryland					
	Massachusetts					
	Michigan					
	Minnesota					
	Mississippi					
	Missouri					
	Montana					
	Nebraska					
	Nevada					
	New Hampshire					
	New Jersey					
	New Mexico					
	New York					
	North Carolina	Embossed dark blue serial on white plate with border line; "NC" monogram and "6-30 1918" at right	none	12-345	1 to approximately 65-000	
	North Dakota					
	Northern Mariana; Islands					No prestate plates. Territory issued plates begin in 1944.
	Ohio					
	Oklahoma					
	Oregon					
	Pennsylvania					
	Puerto Rico					
	Rhode Island					
	South Carolina					
	South Dakota					
	Tennessee					
	Texas					
	Utah					
	Vermont					
	Virgin Islands					
	Virginia					
	Washington					
	West Virginia					
	Wisconsin	Embossed black serial on cream plate; "18" over a W at right.	none	123456	1 to approximately 185000	
	Wyoming					

== See also ==
- Antique vehicle registration
- Electronic license plate
- Motor vehicle registration
- Vehicle license
