= Vehicle registration plates of the United States for 1921 =

1921 license plates in the United States

Vehicle registration plates of the United States by year
| Vehicle registration plates of the United States for 1920 | Events of 1921 | Vehicle registration plates of the United States for 1922 |

Each of the 48 states of the United States of America plus several of its territories and the District of Columbia issued individual passenger license plates for 1921.

== Passenger baseplates ==
Passenger car plates
| Image | Region | Design | Slogan | Serial format | Serials issued | Notes |
|---|---|---|---|---|---|---|
| | Alabama | Embossed red lettering and rims on white base. "21" embossed vertically at left; "ALA" at right. | none | 12345 | | |
| | Alaska | | | | | First year for territory plates. State plates begin in 1959. |
| | American Samoa | | | | | Territory issued plates begin in 1924. |
| | Arizona | | | | | |
| | Arkansas | | | | | |
| | California | Embossed black lettering and rims on yellow base. | none | | unknown | |
| | Canal Zone | Embossed black on gray-green background | none | 1234 | | |
| | Colorado | | | 123–456 | | |
| | Connecticut | Embossed yellow numbers on black plate with border line; "CONN.–1921" embossed in yellow characters centered at bottom. | none | 12-345; 123–456 | 1 to approximately 110-000 | |
| | Delaware | | | | | |
| | District of Columbia | | | | | |
| | Florida | | | | | |
| | Georgia | | | | | |
| | Guam | | | | | |
| | Hawaii | | | | | Territory issued plates begin in 1922. State issued plates begin in 1959. |
| | Idaho | Embossed black numbers on white plate with border line; "IDAHO 54" embossed in black block letters centered at bottom. | none | A 12345; 0/A 12345 | | Coded by county |
| | Illinois | lettering and rims embossed on base; "ILL 21" embossed at right. | none | 123–456 | 1 to approximately ?? | |
| | Indiana | Black lettering embossed on orange base. | none | 123456 | | County-coded |
| | Iowa | Embossed silver lettering on black base; "IA 21" embossed at right. | none. Slogan introduced in 1953 as the state's unofficial nickname. | 123456 | 1 to an approximate 441000 | |
| | Kansas | Embossed black numbers on orange plate with border line; "KAN 21" embossed in black block letters at right. | none | 123456 | | County-coded |
| | Kentucky | Brown base with white embossed lettering and border. "KY. 1921" at right. | none | 123456 | | Issued in blocks by county |
| | Louisiana | | | 12345 | | |
| | Maine | Embossed white lettering and rims on red base. "MAINE 1921" embossed at bottom center. | none | 12-345; 123–456 (both with square dash) | | |
| | Maryland | Embossed red numbers and rims on white plate; "MD 21" embossed at bottom center. | none | 123–456 | | |
| | Massachusetts | | | | | |
| | Michigan | White embossed lettering on black base, stylized "MICH 21" at left. | none | 123–456 | | Issued in front and rear pairs. |
| | Minnesota | Embossed black lettering and rims on turquoise plate; "MINN" embossed vertically at right. | A123456 | | "A" for weight class of vehicle. | |
| | Mississippi | White with embossed red lettering and rim. "1921" stamped vertically to left of registration number, "MISS" stamped vertically to right. | none | 12345 | unknown | |
| | Missouri | Embossed XX lettering and rims on XX base. "MO 1921" embossed at bottom. | none | 12-345 | | |
| | Montana | Embossed XX numbers on XX base. | none | | | |
| | Nebraska | | none | | | |
| | Nevada | | none | | | |
| | New Hampshire | | none | | | County-coded |
| | New Jersey | Embossed white lettering on green base; "N. J. 21" embossed at top. | none | 123456 | | |
| | New Mexico | | none | | | |
| | New York | Embossed white lettering and rims on navy blue base; "NY 1921" embossed at bottom center. | none | 123–456 | | |
| | North Carolina | Embossed white letters on brown base. | none | 123456 | | |
| | North Dakota | Embossed black serial on golden yellow plate with border line; vertical "ND" and "1922" at left and right respectively | none | 12-345 | 1 to approximately 99-000 | |
| | Northern Mariana Islands | | | | | Territory issued plates begin in 1944. |
| | Ohio | | | | | |
| | Oklahoma | | none | | | |
| | Oregon | Embossed white numbers on green plate. "ORE 1921" embossed at right. | none | 12345 | | |
| | Pennsylvania | Embossed blue lettering on yellow base. "PENNA 1921" embossed at bottom with keystone logos on either side. | none | 1–234 | | |
| | Puerto Rico | | | | | |
| | Rhode Island | Embossed black serial on white plate with border line; "R.I. 1921" centered at bottom | none | 12345 | 1 to approximately 43000 | First embossed plate. |
| | South Carolina | | none | | | |
| | South Dakota | Embossed white lettering on green base. | none | 123456 | 30000 to approximately 154000 | Numbers below 30000 reserved for motorcycles and trucks. |
| | Tennessee | | none | 12345 | | |
| | Texas | | | 123–456 | | |
| | Utah | Embossed yellow lettering and top and bottom border on black plate. "U 21" embossed at right. | none | 12345 | | |
| | Vermont | Embossed dark green numbers on white plate; "54 VERMONT" embossed in dark green block letters centered at bottom. | none | 12345; A1234 | | |
| | Virginia | Embossed dark blue lettering on orange plate. | none | 12345 | | |
| | Washington | | none | | | |
| | West Virginia | | none | 12345 | | |
| | Wisconsin | Embossed black serial on light gray plate; vertical "WIS" over "21" at right | none | 123-456 | 1 to approximately 320-000 | |
| | Wyoming | Embossed white numbers on black 1920 base plate; "1921 WYO" embossed in black-on-green metal insert at left. | none | 12345 | | |

== Non-passenger plates ==
Non-passenger Plates
| Image (standard) | Region | Type | Design & Slogan | Serial format | Serials issued | Notes |
|---|---|---|---|---|---|---|
| | Wisconsin | Dealer | Embossed black serial on light gray plate; vertical "WIS" over "21" at right; embossed solid star at left | 1234A | Dealer number and plate number | The number is the dealer number, the letter is the plate number for that dealer. |
| | Wisconsin | Motorcycle | Embossed black serial on light gray plate; "W" over "21" at right; serial is slanted at a 45-degree angle | 1234 | 1 to approximately 6000 | |
| | Wisconsin | Truck | Embossed black serial on light gray plate; vertical "TRUCK" at left, vertical "WIS" over "21" at right. | 12-345 | 1 to approximately 16-000 | |

== See also ==
- Antique vehicle registration
- Electronic license plate
- Motor vehicle registration
- Vehicle license
