= Vehicle registration plates of the United States for 1922 =

1922 license plates in the United States

Vehicle registration plates of the United States by year
Vehicle registration plates of the United States for 1921	Events of 1922	Vehicle registration plates of the United States for 1923

Each of the 48 states of the United States of America plus several of its territories and the District of Columbia issued individual passenger license plates for 1922.

== Passenger baseplates ==
Passenger car plates
Image	Region	Design	Slogan	Serial format	Serials issued	Notes
	Alabama					
	Alaska					
	American Samoa					Territory issued plates begin in 1924.
	Arizona					
	Arkansas					
	California					
	Canal Zone					
	Colorado					
	Connecticut					
	Delaware					
	District of Columbia					
	Florida					
	Georgia					
	Guam					
	Hawai'i					First year for territory issued plates. State plates begin in 1959.
	Idaho					
	Illinois					
	Indiana					
	Iowa					
	Kansas					
	Kentucky					
	Louisiana					
	Maine					
	Maryland					
	Massachusetts					
	Michigan					
	Minnesota					
	Mississippi					
	Missouri					
	Montana					
	Nebraska	Black on orange; "NEB 1925" at right	none	1-12345; 10-1234	Coded by county of issuance (1 or 10)	
	Nevada					
	New Hampshire					
	New Jersey					
	New Mexico					
	New York					
	North Carolina	Embossed black serial on white plate with border line; "NC" monogram and "6-30 22" at right	none	123-456	1 to approximately 213-000	
	North Dakota					
	Northern Mariana; Islands					
	Ohio					
	Oklahoma					
	Oregon					
	Pennsylvania					
	Puerto Rico					
	Rhode Island					
	South Carolina					
	South Dakota					
	Tennessee					
	Texas					
	Utah					
	Vermont					
	Virgin Islands					
	Virginia					
	Washington					
	West Virginia					
	Wisconsin	Embossed white serial on dark green plate; vertical "WIS" over "22" at right	none	123-456	1 to approximately 360-000	
	Wyoming					

== Non-passenger plates ==
Non-passenger plates
Image (standard)	Region	Type	Design and slogan	Serial format	Serials issued	Notes
	Wisconsin	Dealer	Embossed white serial on dark green plate; vertical "WIS" over "22" at right; embossed solid star at left	1234A	Dealer number and plate number	The number is the dealer number, and the letter is the plate number for that dealer.
	Wisconsin	Motorcycle	Embossed white serial on dark green plate; "W" over "22" at right	1234	1 to approximately 3500	First year the number wasn't slanted
	Wisconsin	Truck	Embossed white serial on dark green plate; vertical "WIS" over "22" at right; vertical "TRUCK" at left	12-345	1 to approximately 24-000	

== See also ==
- Antique vehicle registration
- Electronic license plate
- Motor vehicle registration
- Vehicle license
