= Vehicle registration plates of the United States for 1944 =

1944 license plates in the United States

Vehicle registration plates of the United States by year
Vehicle registration plates of the United States for 1943	Events of 1944	Vehicle registration plates of the United States for 1945

Each of the 48 states of the United States of America plus several of its territories and the District of Columbia issued windshield stickers and renewed individual passenger license plates for 1944, while some issued license plates for 1944.

== Passenger baseplates ==
Passenger car plates
Image	Region	Design	Slogan	Serial format	Serials issued	Notes
	Alabama					
	Alaska					
	American Samoa					
	Arizona					
	Arkansas					
	California	As 1941, 1942, and 1943 bases, but with 1944 revalidation sticker				Utilized the 1941 and 1942 series plates, and validated by a windshield sticker.
	Canal Zone					
	Colorado					
	Connecticut					
	Delaware					
	District of Columbia					
	Florida					
	Georgia					
	Guam					
	Hawai'i					
	Idaho					
	Illinois					
	Indiana					
	Iowa					
	Kansas					
	Kentucky					
	Louisiana					
	Maine	Embossed yellow letters and borderline on black base. "MAINE 1944" embossed at top; "VACATIONLAND" embossed at bottom.	"VACATIONLAND" embossed at bottom.	12-345	unknown	
	Maryland					
	Massachusetts					
	Michigan					
	Minnesota					
	Mississippi					
	Missouri					
	Montana					
	Nebraska					
	Nevada					
	New Hampshire					
	New Jersey					
	New Mexico					
	New York					
	North Carolina					
	North Dakota					
	Northern Mariana; Islands					
	Ohio					
	Oklahoma					
	Oregon					The 1942 plates continued in use and were validated by a windshield sticker for 1944.
	Pennsylvania					
	Puerto Rico					
	Rhode Island					
	South Carolina					
	South Dakota					
	Tennessee					
	Texas					
	Utah					
	Vermont					
	Virginia					
	Washington					
	West Virginia					
	Wisconsin	Embossed golden yellow serial on black plate; "19 WISCONSIN 42" at bottom, slogan at top	AMERICA'S DAIRYLAND	123 456	1 to approximately 775 000	Revalidated for 1944 with white on green tabs.
	Wisconsin	Embossed golden yellow serial on black plate with border line; "WIS" at bottom left, yellow oval with debossed "1942" at bottom right	none	A12, A1B, AB1, ABC, 12A, 1A2, 1AB	A00 to 9ZZ	Revalidated for 1944 with white on green tabs.
	Wisconsin	Embossed golden yellow serial on black plate with border line; "WIS" at bottom left, white oval with debossed "43" at bottom right	none	A123	A000 to Z999, 0A00 to 9K99	Revalidated for 1944 with white on green tabs.
	Wyoming					

== Non-passenger plates ==
Non-passenger Plates
Image (standard)	Region	Type	Design & Slogan	Serial format	Serials issued	Notes
	Wisconsin	Bus	Embossed black serial on yellow plate with border line; "WIS. BUS." at bottom right, black oval with debossed "42-43" at bottom left	A 12	Coded by weight class	Revalidated for 1944 with black on yellow tabs and quarterly stickers on the windshield
	Wisconsin	Cabin	Ebmossed black serial on orange plate with border line; "CABIN" at bottom right, vertical "WIS" at left; black oval with debossed "42-43" at bottom left	123	1 to approximately 950	Revalidated for 1944 with unknown color tabs
	Wisconsin	Dealer	Embossed white serial on green plate with border line; "DEALER" at top left, vertical "WIS" at left; white oval with debossed "1944" at top right	A1234	Dealer number and plate number	Number is dealer number, letter is plate number for that dealer
	Wisconsin	Farm	Embossed black serial on white plate with border line; "FARM" at top left, vertical "WIS" at left; black oval with debossed "42-43" at top right	12345	1 to approximately 65000	Revalidated for 1944 with black on white tabs
	Wisconsin	Motorcycle	Embossed black serial on yellow plate with border line; "WIS" at top left; black oval with debossed "1943" at top right	1234	1 to approximately 5200	Revalidated for 1944 with black on yellow tabs
	Wisconsin	Municipal	Unknown design			Motorcycle version also available
	Wisconsin	Official	Unknown design			Motorcycle version also available
	Wisconsin	Light private trailer	Embossed black serial on orange plate with border line; "WIS. TLR." at top left, black oval with debossed "42-43" at top right	1234A	Coded by weight class	Revalidated for 1944 with black on orange tabs. Weight classes are A, B, C, D
	Wisconsin	Limited trailer	Unknown design			Used on trailers hauled 2 miles or less from "loading platform or freight station"
	Wisconsin	Heavy trailer	Embossed black serial on yellow plate with border line; "WIS" over "T-L" at top left, "42" over "43" at top right; quarterly tab at top center	12 A	Coded by weight class	Revalidated for 1944 with quarterly tabs. Issued to all commercial trailers, and private trailers over 8,000lbs. Weight classes are A, B, C, D, E, F, G, H, J, K, L, M, and N for commercial trailers, and private trailers use weight classes E and above.
	Wisconsin	Truck	Embossed black serial on orange plate with border line; "WIS. TRK." at top left, black oval with debossed "42-43" at top right	12345A	Coded by weight class	Revalidated for 1944 with black on orange tabs. Weight classes are A, B, C, and D
	Wisconsin	Heavy truck	Embossed black serial on yellow plate with border line; "WIS. TRK." at bottom right, black oval with debossed "42-43" at bottom left	A12345	Coded by weight class	Revalidated for 1944 with black on yellow tabs and quarterly tabs in the windshield. Issued to all commercial trucks, and private trucks over 8,000lbs. Weight classes are A, B, C, D, E, F, G, H, J, K, L, M, and N for commercial trucks, and private trucks use the E weight class and above

== See also ==
- Antique vehicle registration
- Electronic license plate
- Motor vehicle registration
- Vehicle license
