= Vehicle registration plates of the United States for 1924 =

1924 license plates in the United States

Vehicle registration plates of the United States by year
Vehicle registration plates of the United States for 1923	Events of 1924	Vehicle registration plates of the United States for 1925

Each of the 48 states of the United States of America plus several of its territories and the District of Columbia issued individual passenger license plates for 1924.

== Passenger baseplates ==
Passenger Car Plates
Image	Region	Design	Slogan	Serial format	Serials issued	Notes
	Alabama					
	Alaska					
	American Samoa					This is the first year the territory issued license plates.
	Arizona					
	Arkansas					
	California					
	Canal Zone					
	Colorado					
	Connecticut					
	Delaware					
	District of Columbia					
	Florida					
	Georgia					
	Guam					
	Hawai'i					
	Idaho					
	Illinois					
150px	Indiana					
	Iowa					
	Kansas					
	Kentucky					
	Louisiana					
	Maine					
	Maryland					
	Massachusetts					
	Michigan					
	Minnesota					
	Mississippi					
	Missouri					
	Montana					
	Nebraska					
	Nevada					
	New Hampshire					
	New Jersey					
	New Mexico					
	New York					
	North Carolina					
	North Dakota					
	Northern Mariana; Islands					
	Ohio					
	Oklahoma	Embossed white serial on olive green plate with border line; vertical "OKLA" and "1924" at left and right respectively	none	123F456; 123.456		Plates with an 'F' in the serial were issued on Fords. This practice continued through 1928.
	Oregon					
	Pennsylvania					
	Puerto Rico					
	Rhode Island					
	South Carolina					
	South Dakota					
	Tennessee					
	Texas					
	Utah					
	Vermont					
	Virginia					
	Washington					
	West Virginia					
	Wisconsin	Embossed white serial on black plate; vertical "WIS" over "24" at right	none	A123-456	Coded by weight class	First year for weight classes on passenger plates; weight classes are A, B, C, D, and E
	Wyoming					

== Non-passenger plates ==
Non-passenger Plates
Image (standard)	Region	Type	Design & Slogan	Serial format	Serials issued	Notes
	Illinois	Trailer	Embossed yellow serial on black plate with border line; stylized "ILL" at top right, "24" at bottom right; vertical stacked "TRAILER" at left	1234	1 to 1791	First year of issue for Illinois trailer plates
	Wisconsin	Dealer	Embossed white serial on black plate; vertical "WIS" over "24" at right; embossed solid star at left	1234A	Dealer number and plate number	The number is the dealer number, the letter is the plate number for that dealer
	Wisconsin	Motorcycle	Embossed white serial on black plate; "W" over "24" at right	A1234	A 1 to approximately A2100	Issued to regular motorcycles
	Wisconsin	Motorcycle	Embossed white serial on black plate; "W" over "24" at right	B123	B 1 to approximately B250	Issued to motorcycles with sidecars
	Wisconsin	Motorcycle dealer	Embossed white serial on black plate; format unknown			
	Wisconsin	Municipal	Embossed white serial on red plate; vertical "WIS" at right	1234	1 to approximately 3100	First year of issue for Wisconsin municipal plates
	Wisconsin	Municipal motorcycle	Embossed white serial on red plate; unknown format	123	1 to approximately 150	First year of issue for Wisconsin municipal motorcycle plates
	Wisconsin	Truck	Embossed white serial on black plate; vertical "WIS" over "24" at right; vertical "TRUCK" at left	A12-345	Coded by weight class	Weight classes are A, B, C, D, E, and F

== See also ==
- Antique vehicle registration
- Electronic license plate
- Motor vehicle registration
- Vehicle license
