= Vehicle registration plates of the Canal Zone =

The Canal Zone
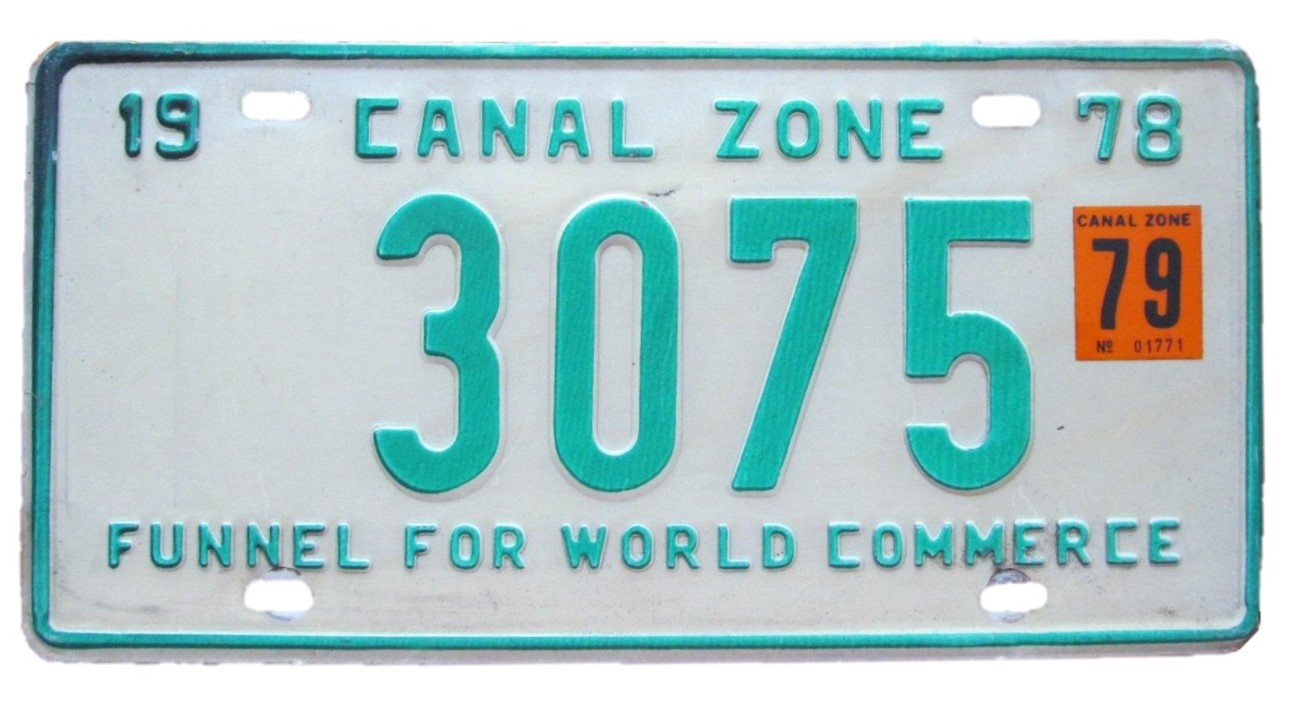

Current series
- Slogan: Funnel For World Commerce
- Size: 12 in × 6 in 30 cm × 15 cm
- Material: Aluminum
- Serial format: 12345
- Introduced: January 1, 1978

Availability
- Issued by: Canal Zone Government, U.S.

History
- First issued: 1910; 116 years ago
- Last issued: December 31, 1978; 47 years ago

The former U.S. territory of the Canal Zone first issued license plates in 1910, and this continued until September 1979. (The 1979 plate was the 1978 plate with a 1979 decal affixed.) A single plate was issued for all years. The country of Panama also issued license plates identifying United States citizens that lived in Panama but worked in the Canal Zone, but these plates have the country name "Panama" clearly showing on them. Since reciprocity for license plates between the Canal Zone and Panama did not exist until 1950, old photos often show local vehicles with two different license plates mounted on the vehicle.

== Passenger baseplates ==
=== 1910 to 1955 ===
Image	Date	Design	Slogan	Serial format	Serials issued	Notes
123	1910	White on dark blue	None	123	1 to ?	Plates started at number one and continued sequentially.
123	1911	Dark blue on white	None	123		Plate numbers are believed to have continued sequentially from where they left off in 1910. The 1910 plate numbers issued were not reused. This scheme continued through 1916.
123	1912	White on dark blue	None	123		
123	1913	Dark blue on white	None	123		
123	1914	White on dark blue	None	123		
123	1915	Dark blue on white	None	123		
1234	1916	White on dark blue	None	123 and 1234		Some four digit plates are known, but the numbers are too high to fit into the sequence of plates issued.
1234	1917	Black on yellow	None	1234		All previous plates were cancelled and renumbering started at number one.
1234	1918	Black on white	None	1234		
1234	1919	White on dark blue	None	1234		
	1920	Black on dark yellow	None	1234		
	1921	Black on gray-green	None	1234		
1234	1922	White on black	None	1234		
1234	1923	Black on yellow	None	1234		
1234	1924	Yellow on dark blue	None	1234		
1234	1925	White on dark blue	None	1234		
1234	1926	Black on yellow	None	1234		
1234	1927	Red on white	None	1234		First year that "Canal Zone" is spelled out.
1234	1928	Black on light orange	None	1234		
1234	1929	Red on white	None	1234		
1234	1930	Black on yellow	None	1234		
1234	1931	Red on white	None	1234		
1234	1932	Black on yellow	None	1234		
1234	1933	Red on white	None	1234		
1234	1934	White on medium blue	None	1234		
1234	1935	Medium blue on yellow	None	1234		
1234	1936	Red on white	None	1234		
12345	1937	White on dark green	None	12345		
12345	1938	White on red	None	12345		
12345	1939	Black on yellow	None	12345		
	1940	Yellow on dark green	None	12345		
12345	1941	Black on yellow	None	12345		
	1942-44	White on dark blue	None	12345		1942: Base plate only
	1942-44	White on dark blue	None	12345		1943: Round black on yellow validation tab with "43" at top and serial number below
	1942-44	White on dark blue	None	12345		1944: Rectangular black on red validation tab with serial number followed by "44"
12345	1945	Black on orange	None	12345		
12345	1946	Yellow on black	None	12345		
	1947	White on black	None	12345		
	1948	Dark blue on white	None	12345		
	1949	Off white on blue	None	12345		
12345	1950	White on maroon	None	12345		
12345	1951	White on dark green	None	12345		
12345	1952	Dark green on yellow	None	12345		
12345	1953	Maroon on white	None	12345		
12345	1954	White on orange	None	12345		
12345	1955	Yellow on black	None	12345		

=== 1956 to 1979 ===
In 1956, the United States, Canada and Mexico came to an agreement with the American Association of Motor Vehicle Administrators, the Automobile Manufacturers Association and the National Safety Council that standardized the size for license plates for vehicles (except those for motorcycles) at 6 inches (15 cm) in height by 12 inches (30 cm) in width, with standardized mounting holes.

Image	Date	Design	Slogan	Serial format	Serials issued	Notes
12345	1956	Black on yellow	None	12345		
12345	1957	Yellow on black	None	12345		
12345	1958	Black on yellow	None	12345		
	1959	Yellow on black	None	12345		Sample plate shown.
	1960	Black on yellow	None	12345		
12345	1961	Yellow on black	Funnel For World Commerce	12345		
12345	1962	Black on yellow	Funnel For World Commerce	12345		
12345	1963	Yellow on black	Funnel For World Commerce	12345		
12345	1964	Black on yellow	Funnel For World Commerce	12345		
12345	1965	Yellow on black	Funnel For World Commerce	12345		
12345	1966	Black on yellow	Funnel For World Commerce	12345		
12345	1967	Yellow on black	Funnel For World Commerce	12345		
12345	1968	Black on yellow	Funnel For World Commerce	12345		
	1969	Yellow on black	Funnel For World Commerce	12345		Sample plate shown.
12345	1970	Black on yellow	Funnel For World Commerce	12345		
12345	1971	Yellow on black	Funnel For World Commerce	12345		
12345	1972	Green on white	Funnel For World Commerce	12345		First year for reflective background.
12345	1973	Blue on white	Funnel For World Commerce	12345		
12345	1974	Green on white	Funnel For World Commerce	12345		
12345	1975	Blue on white	Funnel For World Commerce	12345		
12345	1976	Green on white	Funnel For World Commerce	12345		
	1977	Blue on white	Funnel For World Commerce	12345		
	1978–79	Green on white	Funnel For World Commerce	12345		1978: Base plate only
	1978–79	Green on white	Funnel For World Commerce	12345		1979: Rectangular black on red validation sticker with small "Canal Zone" at top, "79" in center, and small "No" and serial number at bottom

== Non-passenger plates ==
Image	Type	Design	Serial format	Serials issued	Notes
	1971 Motorcycle	Yellow on black with border line	M-123		
	1979 Trailer	Green on white with border line	T-123		Sticker on 1978 base

== Miniature automobile license plate ==
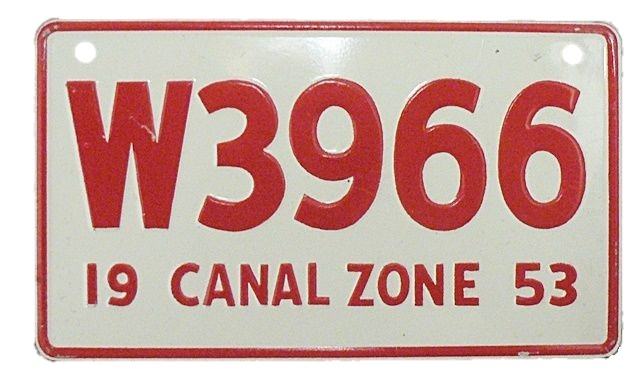

Miniature automobile license plates were included in boxes of Wheaties cereal in 1953, and they are oftentimes called bicycle license plates. Included in one of the sets issued by General Mills was a Canal Zone license plate. Other plates in this set included the following locations: Alaska, District of Columbia, Dominican Republic, Guam, Hawaii, Italy-Military, Philippines, Virgin Islands, and the Maharajah plate with a golden double headed eagle. Note that all of the license plates issued for each state, province, territory, or country had the same serial number (Canal Zone plates all have the W3966 serial number).
