= Antique vehicle registration =

Antique vehicle license plates

Antique vehicle registration is a special form of motor vehicle registration for vehicles that are considered antique, classic, vintage, or historic. The specific term used and the definition of a qualifying vehicle vary widely from country to country, as well as within a country, especially in federations like the United States, Germany, and Australia.

Typically, an antique vehicle is defined by its age at the time antique vehicle registration is sought. For instance, in the U.S. state of Connecticut, this age is 20 years; in Virginia, it is 25 years; in Arkansas, it is 45 years. Other examples include 30 years in the Australian state of Queensland, Sweden, and Brazil, and 35 years in Singapore. In the United Kingdom, vehicles built before 1 January 1973 are considered antique, although vehicles registered before 7 January 1973 are presumed to be manufactured in 1972 and are thus exempt from tax.

In Germany, vehicles that are at least 30 years old and have retained their original condition can be registered as "historic vehicles" and are eligible for a special "H" license plate, which signifies their status as a collector's item. This registration often comes with tax benefits and exemptions from certain modern vehicle regulations.

In Australia, the rules for antique vehicle registration vary between states. For example, in Queensland, vehicles older than 30 years can be registered under the "Special Interest Vehicle Scheme," which offers reduced registration fees and restrictions on vehicle use similar to those in the United States. The vehicle must be kept in its original condition, and usage is generally limited to car shows, club events, and occasional trips within the regulations.

In Sweden, antique vehicles (referred to as "veteranfordon") are those that are 30 years or older and in original condition. They benefit from reduced road taxes and relaxed inspection requirements, with inspections required only every two years instead of annually.

Japan has a unique system where vehicles over 10 years old can face increased taxes due to their age, but vehicles over 30 years old can be registered as "historic vehicles" if they meet certain preservation standards. These vehicles are eligible for special "classic car" plates, which signify their historical value.

Antique vehicle registration often provides benefits such as reduced or waived registration fees, exemption from vehicle inspection, and/or distinctive vehicle registration plates. However, this often comes with restrictions on the use of the vehicle. For example, in Virginia, antique vehicles can only be used for car club activities, parades, and other such events, along with occasional pleasure driving within 250 miles of the owner's residence. In contrast, Connecticut imposes no such restrictions on vehicles registered as antiques. In Germany, historic vehicles are typically exempt from emission regulations but must still pass a special roadworthiness test every two years.

The special license plates issued for antique vehicles often feature unique designs and legends such as "Antique," "Historic," "Early American," or "Horseless Carriage." These plates may have separate number sequences and distinct color schemes, as seen in Brazil, where antique plates are gray on black, reversing the colors of standard plates. In some jurisdictions, such as Virginia and Tennessee, owners can opt for "Year of Manufacture" (YOM) plates, which are authentic plates from the vehicle's model year.

Tennessee permits the use of antique model year license plates for vehicles registered as antiques, provided the state-issued antique tag and registration are kept inside the vehicle for inspection. Similarly, Germany allows the use of vintage plates (often referred to as "H-Kennzeichen") for vehicles that meet specific historic criteria.
