= Vehicle registration plates of the Northern Mariana Islands =

Northern Mariana Islands vehicle license plates

The Northern Mariana Islands
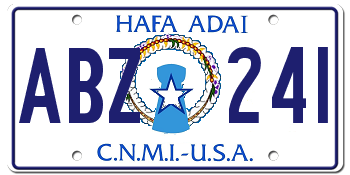
- Country: United States
- Country code: USA

Current series
- Slogan: HAFA ADAI
- Introduced: 2005; 21 years ago

History
- First issued: 1968; 58 years ago

The U.S. commonwealth of the Northern Mariana Islands first required its residents to register their motor vehicles and display vehicle registration plates in 1968.

== Passenger baseplates 1968 to present ==
Since 1989, all passenger plates have featured a round mounting hole at the top right and horizontal slots in the other three corners, as with plates of Hawaii and Guam.

Image	First issued	Design	Slogan	Serial format	Serials issued	Notes
	1968		None	1234		
	1978		None	1234		
	1989	Dark blue embossed serials on reflective white, with motto centered at top, "C.N.M.I.-U.S.A." centered at the bottom, and the CNMI's seal in the center.	HAFA ADAI	ABC 123	AAA 000 to approximately ACZ 999; ADK 000 to present	
	2005	As above, but with serials surface-printed instead of embossed (by at least the ADA series).	HAFA ADAI	ABC 123	Approximately ADA 000 to ADK 999	
