= Vehicle registration plates of Puerto Rico =

Puerto Rico
- Country: United States
- Country code: USA

Current series
- Slogan: Isla del Encanto
- Size: 12 in × 6 in 30 cm × 15 cm
- Material: Aluminum
- Serial format: ABC 123
- Introduced: March 2023

Availability
- Issued by: Driver Services Directorate

History
- First issued: 1906; 120 years ago

The U.S. Commonwealth of Puerto Rico first required its residents to register their motor vehicles and display vehicle registration plates in 1906. Only rear plates have been required since 1976.

== Passenger baseplates 1930–present ==
In 1956, the United States, Canada, and Mexico reached an agreement with the American Association of Motor Vehicle Administrators, the Automobile Manufacturers Association and the National Safety Council to standardize the size for license plates for vehicles (except those for motorcycles) at 6 inches (15 cm) in height by 12 inches (30 cm) in width, with standardized mounting holes. The 1955 (dated 1956) issue was the first Puerto Rico license plate that complied with these standards. However, in 2012, the Puerto Rican government began issuing optional European-style plates that incorporate the design language of the standard-issue plates in a longer and narrower size typically seen in Europe.

Image	Dates issued	Design	Slogan	Serial format	Serials issued	Notes
	1930	Black letters on white background with PR		AB-123		
	1939	US Army plates - red lettering on white shape of island		123		
	1950	White letters on green background		12-123		
	1951	Red letters on white background		12-123		
	1952	Yellow letters on black background		12-123		
	1953	Black letters on yellow background		12-123		
	1954	White letters on dark blue background		12-123		
	1955	Black letters on white background		12-123		
	1956	White letters on light red background		123-123		
	1957	Yellow letters on black background		123-123		
	1958	White letters on blue background		12-123		
	1967	Light orange letters on blue background		123-123		
	1970	Embossed dark blue on orange background with outline of island		12x123		
	1976	Embossed black on reflective white		12345-A		
	1978	Embossed black serial on white background	None	12A123		
	January 1987 – December 2001; 2003 – December 2007	Embossed black on reflective white with fort graphic	Isla Del Encanto	ABC 123	AAA 001 to FCX 999; FLM 501 to HEN 999	
	January 2002 – 2003	Embossed black on flag graphics	Cincuentenario	ABC 123	FCY 001 to FLM 500	
	December 2007 – February 2023	Screened black on reflective fort graphic	Isla Del Encanto	ABC 123	HEO 001 to HRR 999;IEJ 001 to JCA 999; JCE 001- JGI 999; JGL 001 - JJF 999; JJI 001 - JKD 999; JLU; JRE 001 - JUJ 999; JRX; JUM 001 - JVJ 999	Early plates feature a dash between the letters and numbers. Euro-style plates offered at an additional cost and were issued in the following series: ITA - ITE; IXV - IXZ; JEG; JGA - JGB; JKA; JLU; JRX.
	March 2023 – present	Screened black on reflective white with fort graphic, similar to the 1986 series	Isla Del Encanto	ABC 123	KBV 001 to KYY 388 (as of November 17, 2026)	Optional European style plates were offered in the following series: JVQ-JVT; KCZ; KHR-KHS; KIL-KIO; KMX-KMZ; KOQ-KOR; KRD-KRE, KRU-KRW, KRZ; KSA‐KSB; KVG-KVH; KXB-KXF. "KBU" series reserved for Modified Classic Vehicle plates.

== Optional plates ==
Image	Dates issued	Design	Slogan	Serial format	Serials issued	Notes
	2009–2012	Black on reflective white with green stripes on top and orange stripes on bottom and Mayagüez 2010 logo in the center	Isla Del Encanto Mayaguez 2010	ABC 123	HRS 001 to HVZ 999	Issued for the 2010 Central American and Caribbean Games
	2012–2013	A picture of the Puerto Rican Governor's mansion	Puerto Rico does it better Puerto Rico lo hace mejor	ABC 123	HWD 001 to IEI 999	European-sized plates optionally offered in the following series: IAA-IAJ; IQR 001- IQR 999.
	2013–2015	Image of a Puerto Rico Manatee	San Juan Estuary	ABC 123	IAK 001 to IAP 999	
	2017		100 years of the Senate of Puerto Rico	ABC 123	JCB 001 - JCD 999, JGJ 001 - JGK 999	
	2017–2018		Puerto Rico Olympic Committee	ABC 123	JJG 001 - JJH 999, PUR 001 to PUR 999	
	2020–2021		Make A Wish Foundation	ABC 123	JKE 001 - JRD 999	European-sized plates optionally offered (JLV 001 - JLX 999; JQK 001 -JQL 999; JRW 001 - JRW 999). "JNU" series was reserved for Classic Vehicle plates and "JNV" series was reserved for Modified Classic Vehicle plates.
	2022–2023	Celebration of the hit #3,000 of Roberto Clemente	Roberto Clemente	ABC 123	JVK 001 - JVP 999; JVQ, JVW 001 - JVW 999; JWA 001 - KAD 999, KAK 001 - KBN 999	Initial serial font was a 3M typeface. Later plates used. European-styled plates were offered using the following series: JRY 001 - JRZ 999; JUK 001 - JUL 999; some JVQ series.
	2021–2022	Celebration of the 500th anniversary of the founding of San Juan	500 Years of San Juan	ABC 123	JVU 001 - JVV 999, JVX 001 - JVZ 999, KAE 001 - KAJ 999, KBO 001 - KBT 999	Initial serial font was a 3M typeface.

== Non-passenger plates ==
Image	Type	Dates issued	Design	Slogan	Serial format	Serials issued	Notes
		2015	Screened black serial on green to white to red faded background, "PUERTO RICO" in white at bottom, Castillo del Morro graphic over green fields at left	"www.gobierno.pr" in small black type below serial at far right	1234AB		
	Omnibus		Embossed black characters on a white background; black “OMNI BUS” text at top, "PUERTO RICO" at bottom.		123-OPR		
	Omnibus		Embossed black characters on white background; “OMNIBUS” text at top.		1234-OP		
	Truck under 1 ton		Embossed black characters on white background, "CARGA" text at top.		123-456		Formerly issued for cargo vehicles.
	Truck over 1 ton		Embossed black characters on white background, "CARGA" at top.		A-12345		
	Truck over 1 ton		Black characters on white background, "CARGA" text at top.		A12345		Issued for cargo vehicles such as pickup trucks.
	Motorcycle		Black characters on white background, "PUERTO RICO" at top, "MOTORA" at bottom.		123456		
	Trailer		Black characters on white background, "ARRASTRE" text at top.		123456A		
	School Vehicle		Black characters on white background, "ESCOLAR" text at top.		12345TE		

== See also ==
- List of highways in Puerto Rico
