= Electronic license plate =

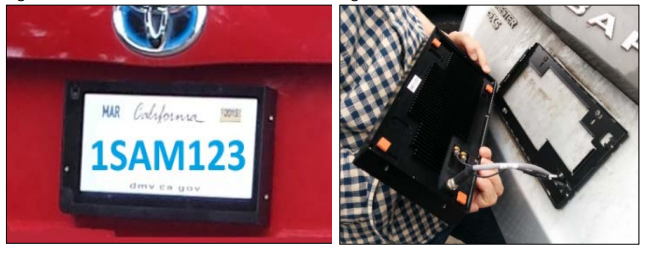
A depiction of an Electronic License Plate

An electronic license plate (also referred to as a digital display license plate or a digital license plate) is a vehicle-mounted identification device that emits a radio signal for tracking and digital monitoring purposes. Various patents have been published to replace traditional metal and plastic license plates. It communicates directly with a vehicle's computer system and other remote systems related to vehicle regulation.

== History ==
Dean L. Naddeo requested a patent on June 11, 2002, for electronic license plates. The patent describes the capability to connect the license plate to a centralized system for registration control, and a method whereby the centralized system can update the license plate display. Two examples are given; 1) in the situation where the vehicle is involved in a crime, or 2) where the registration is no longer valid.

== Design ==
Similar in size to traditional license plates, an electronic license plate often has a digital display measuring 12 by 6 inches (30 by 15 cm) which is set into a rectangular housing. The display is powered either directly from the vehicle's power system or by batteries and can communicate with the vehicle's onboard computer.

== Criticisms of Electronic License Plates ==
=== Price and practicality ===
One common criticism of Electronic License Plates is the high price of such devices, with Tom Nardi of Hackaday stating that "[t]he question of whether or not the average car owner is willing to pay $800 to avoid the DMV is one we can't really answer".

=== Security and privacy ===
Another criticism of electronic license plates is the ability for third parties to disable their vehicle or display messages on their license plate without their permission, and the device constantly uploading GPS data.

In 2022, a security expert demonstrated how a hacker could access electronic license plate company Reviver's backend web-based database to track or change license plates at will, including changing a vehicle's status to "STOLEN" and informing authorities. In 2024, another security firm researcher demonstrated how a hacker could physically "jailbreak" an electronic license plate by modifying its firmware, which would allow them to control what the plate displays, including changing the license plate number to evade toll fees, camera surveillance, and/or law enforcement.

=== Technical issues and legality ===
One criticism of electronic license plates is that they are computer systems and inherently prone to technical glitches and issues. An example would be popular car YouTuber Doug DeMuro commenting on how a license plate was downloading a software update. Another issue is that the primary manufacturer RPlate prevents their customer from opening it, preventing any repairs such as a broken screen from being performed by the user.

== Adoption in the United States ==
In California, the California Department of Motor Vehicles began a small-scale pilot program in partnership with Reviver in December 2015 under the authorization by the Senate Bill SB 806 of 2013. The pilot program was funded to operate until January 1, 2023, after several legislative extensions. The Assembly Bill AB 984 was signed into law by governor Gavin Newsom on September 29, 2022, enabling permanent statewide deployment of digital license plates by Reviver, effective January 1, 2023.

In Michigan, the state legislature passed the 2018 Public Act 656 (originating as House Bill 4990 of 2017) on June 5, 2018, allowing the use of digital license plates by Reviver. However, the state terminated Reviver's program on August 10, 2024, at which point sales and renewals ended, though existing plates remain valid until registration expiration.

In Arizona, Reviver's digital license plates have been available to drivers since January 2019.

In Texas, the Senate Bill 604 was passed by the 86th Texas Legislature on May 17, 2019, signed into law by governor Greg Abbott on June 10, 2019, and officially took effect on September 1, 2019. It authorized digital license plates by Reviver for commercial and governmental fleets. The Texas Department of Motor Vehicles announced that digital license plates would be available for purchase for eligible commercial fleet vehicles since June 1, 2022, and Reviver (the contracted provider) formally launched the program on June 14, 2022.
