= Vehicle registration plates of West Virginia =

West Virginia vehicle license plates

West Virginia
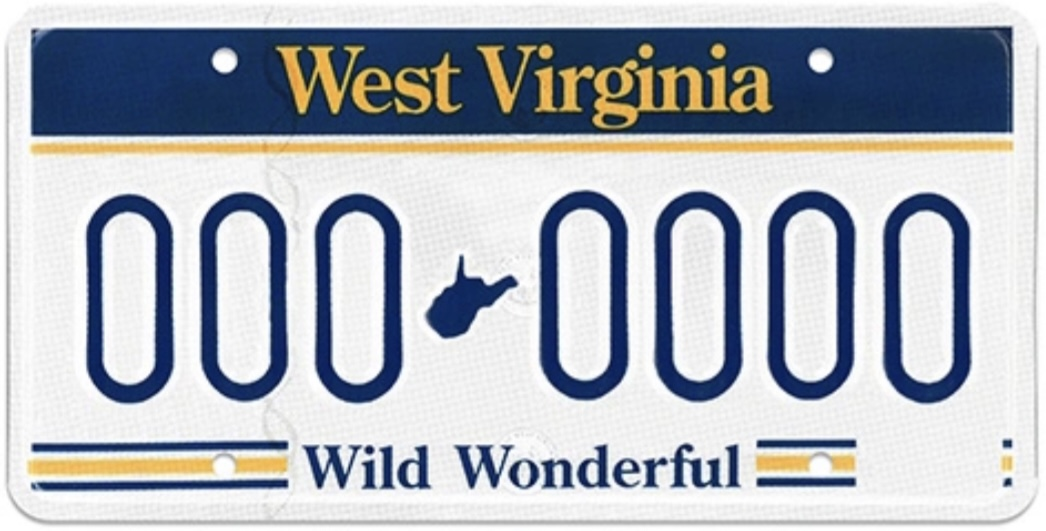

Current series
- Slogan: Wild, Wonderful
- Size: 12 in × 6 in 30 cm × 15 cm
- Material: Aluminum
- Serial format: 012 345A; A12 345A (month-coded)
- Introduced: July 2023

Availability
- Issued by: West Virginia Department of Transportation, Division of Motor Vehicles

History
- First issued: May 1, 1905

The U.S. state of West Virginia first required its residents to register their motor vehicles and display license plates in 1905. As of 2026, plates are issued by the West Virginia Department of Transportation through its Division of Motor Vehicles. Only rear plates have been required since 1944.

== Passenger baseplates ==
=== 1905 to 1970 ===
In 1956, the United States, Canada, and Mexico came to an agreement with the American Association of Motor Vehicle Administrators, the Automobile Manufacturers Association and the National Safety Council that standardized the size for license plates for vehicles (except those for motorcycles) at 6 inches (15 cm) in height by 12 inches (30 cm) in width, with standardized mounting holes. The 1956–57 (dated 1957) issue was the first West Virginia license plate that complied with these standards.

Image	Dates issued	Design	Slogan	Serial format	Serials issued	Notes
	1905	Embossed blue serial on green plate; "W. VA." at right; "LICENSED" and "05" above and below serial respectively	none	123	1 to approximately 200	
	1906	Embossed gray serial on dark blue plate; "W. VA." at right; "LICENSED" and "1906" above and below serial respectively	none	123	201 to approximately 500	One of the rarest license plates in American history. Less than five of these plates are known to exist.
	1907–09	Black serial on white porcelain plate; "W. VA." at right and "LICENSED" centered at top	none	1234	401 to approximately 1100	
	1909–10	Black serial on red porcelain plate; "W. VA. 1909" at right and "LICENSED" centered at top	none	123	1 to approximately 900	
	1910–11	White serial on dark blue porcelain plate; "W. VA. 1910" at right and "LICENSED" centered at top	none	1234	1 to approximately 1700	
	1911–12	Black serial on white porcelain plate; "W VA" at left, vertical "1911" at right and "LICENSED" centered at top	none	1234	1 to approximately 2500	
	1912–13	White serial on forest green porcelain plate; vertical "1912" and "W. VA" at left and right respectively; "LICENSE" centered at top	none	1234	1 to approximately 3500	
	1913–14	Yellow serial on black porcelain plate; vertical "JULY 1914" and "W. VA." at left and right respectively; "LICENSE" centered at top	none	1234	1 to approximately 6000	
	1914–15	White serial on light blue porcelain plate; vertical "1914 1915" and "W. VA." at left and right respectively; "LICENSE" centered at top	none	12345	1 to approximately 10500	
	1915–16	White serial on red porcelain plate; vertical "1915 1916" and "W. VA." at left and right respectively; "LICENSE" centered at top	none	12345	1 to approximately 16500	
	1916–17	Navy blue serial on white flat metal plate; vertical "W. VA." and "1916-17" at left and right respectively; "LICENSED" centered at top	none	12345	1 to approximately 25000	
	1917–18	Embossed yellow serial on black plate with border line; "W.VA 17-18" at right	none	12345	1 to approximately 33000	
	1918–19	Embossed black serial on white plate with border line; "W.VA 18-19" at right	none	12345	1 to approximately 43000	
	1919–20	Embossed white serial on black plate with border line; "W.VA 19-20" at right	none	12345	1 to approximately 66000	Valid from July 1, 1919 through December 31, 1920.
	1921	Embossed white serial on dark blue plate with border line; "W VA" monogram and "1921" at right	none	12345	1 to approximately 87000	
	1922	Embossed black serial on tan plate with border line; "W VA" monogram and "1922" at right	none	12345	1 to approximately 96000	
	1923	Embossed red serial on white plate; "WEST VIRGINIA 1923" at bottom	none	123-456	1 to approximately 141-000	First use of the full state name.
	1924	Embossed white serial on maroon plate; "WEST VIRGINIA 1924" at bottom	none	123-456	1 to approximately 165-000	
	1925	Embossed dark blue serial on orange plate; "WEST VIRGINIA 1925" at bottom	none	123-456	1 to approximately 173-000	
	1926	Embossed white serial on dark blue plate; "WEST VIRGINIA 1926" at top	none	123-456	1 to approximately 211-000	
	1927	Embossed black serial on gray plate; "WEST VIRGINIA 1927" at top	none	123-456	1 to approximately 207-000	
	1928	Embossed white serial on dark green plate; "WEST VIRGINIA 1928" at bottom	none	123-456	1 to approximately 217-000	
	1929	Embossed orange serial on black plate; "WEST VIRGINIA 1929" at bottom	none	123-456	1 to approximately 232-000	
	1930	Embossed black serial on gray plate; "W. VA. – 1930" centered at bottom	none	123-456	1 to approximately 223-000	
	1931	Embossed yellow serial on black plate; "W. VA. – 1931" centered at bottom	none	123-456	1 to approximately 213-000	
	1932	Embossed white serial on black plate; "W. VA. – 1932" centered at bottom	none	123-456	1 to approximately 192-000	
	1933–34	Embossed yellow serial on black plate; "W. VA. – 1933" centered at bottom	none	123-456	1 to approximately 214-000	Validated from January 1 through June 30, 1934 with windshield stickers.
	1934–35	Embossed black serial on yellow plate; "W. VA.-34-35" centered at bottom	none	123-456	1 to approximately 207-000	
	1935–36	Embossed yellow serial on black plate; "W. VA.-35-36" centered at bottom	none	123-456	1 to approximately 219-000	
	1936–37	Embossed black serial on yellow plate; "W. VA.-36-37" centered at top	none	123-456	1 to approximately 224-000	
	1937–38	Embossed yellow serial on black plate; "W. VA.-37-38" centered at top	none	123-456	1 to approximately 237-000	
	1938–39	Embossed black serial on yellow plate; "W. VA.-38-39" centered at bottom	none	123-456	1 to approximately 236-000	
	1939–40	Embossed yellow serial on black plate; "W. VA.-39-40" centered at bottom	none	123-456	1 to approximately 245-000	
	1940–41	Embossed black serial on yellow plate; "W. VA.-40-41" centered at bottom	none	123-456	1 to approximately 258-000	
	1941–44	Embossed yellow serial on black plate with border line; "W. VA. EXP.-6-30-42" at bottom	none	123-456	1 to approximately 349-000	Revalidated through June 30, 1943 with white tabs, then through June 30, 1944 with windshield stickers, due to metal conservation for World War II.
	1944–45	Embossed black serial on yellow plate with border line; "W. VA. EXP.-6-30-45" at bottom	none	123-456	1 to approximately 214-000	
	1945–46	As 1941–44 base, but with "W. VA. EXP.-6-30-46" at bottom	none	123-456	1 to approximately 239-000	
	1946–47	As 1944–45 base, but with "W. VA. EXP.-6-30-47" at bottom	none	123-456	1 to approximately 250-000	
	1947–48	As 1941–44 base, but with "W. VA. EXP.-6-30-48" at bottom	none	123-456	1 to approximately 282-000	
	1948–49	As 1944–45 base, but with "W. VA. EXP.-6-30-49" at bottom	none	123-456	1 to approximately 312-000	
	1949–50	As 1941–44 base, but with "W. VA. EXP.-6-30-50" at bottom	none	123-456	1 to approximately 339-000	
	1950–51	As 1944–45 base, but with "W. VA. EXP.-6-30-51" at bottom	none	123-456	1 to approximately 365-000	
	1951–52	As 1941–44 base, but with "W. VA. EXP.-6-30-52" at bottom	none	123-456	1 to approximately 377-000	
	1952–53	As 1944–45 base, but with "W. VA. EXP.-6-30-53" at bottom	none	123-456	1 to approximately 379-000	
	1953–54	As 1941–44 base, but with "W. VA. EXP.-6-30-54" at bottom	none	123-456	1 to approximately 399-000	
	1954–55	As 1944–45 base, but with "WEST VIRGINIA 54" at bottom	none	123-456	1 to approximately 418-000	
	1955–56	Embossed white serial on green plate with border line; "WEST VIRGINIA 56" at bottom	none	123-456	1 to approximately 436-000	
	1956–57	Embossed yellow serial on dark blue plate with border line; "WEST VIRGINIA" centered at bottom; "19" at bottom left and "57" at bottom right	none	123-456	1 to approximately 461-000	First 6" x 12" plate.
	1957–58	Embossed green serial on white plate with border line; "WEST VIRGINIA" centered at bottom; "58" at bottom right	none	123-456	1 to approximately 469-000	
	1958–59	Embossed white serial on green plate with border line; "WEST VIRGINIA" centered at bottom; "19" at bottom left and "59" at bottom right	none	123-456	1 to approximately 478-000	
	1959–60	Embossed red serial on white plate with border line; "WEST VIRGINIA" centered at bottom; "19" at bottom left and "60" at bottom right	none	123-456	1 to approximately 471-000	
	1960–61	Embossed white serial on dark red plate with border line; "WEST VIRGINIA" centered at bottom; "19" at bottom left and "61" at bottom right	none	123-456	1 to 141-826	
	1960–61	As above, but with elements debossed	none	123-456	141-827 to approximately 476-000	
	1961–62	Embossed green serial on reflective white plate with border line; "WEST VIRGINIA" centered at bottom; "19" at bottom left and "62" at bottom right	none	123-456	1 to approximately 488-000	
	1962–63	Debossed yellow serial on reflective blue plate with border line; "WEST VIRGINIA" centered at bottom; "19" at bottom left and "63" at bottom right	"1863 CENTENNIAL 1963" at top	123-456	1 to approximately 490-000	Both this and the 1963–64 base commemorated West Virginia's 100 years as a separate state.
	1963–64	Embossed blue serial on reflective yellow plate with border line; "WEST VIRGINIA" centered at bottom; "19" at bottom left and "64" at bottom right	"1863 CENTENNIAL 1963" at top	123-456	1 to approximately 521-000	
	1964–65	As 1962–63 base, but with "65" at bottom right	"MOUNTAIN STATE" centered at top	123-456	1 to approximately 522-000	
	1965–66	As 1963–64 base, but with "66" at bottom right	"MOUNTAIN STATE" centered at top	123-456	1 to approximately 558-000	
	1966–67	As 1962–63 base, but with "67" at bottom right	"MOUNTAIN STATE" centered at top	123-456	1 to approximately 582-000	
	1967–68	As 1963–64 base, but with "68" at bottom right	"MOUNTAIN STATE" centered at top	123-456	1 to approximately 603-000	
	1968–69	As 1962–63 base, but with "69" at bottom right	"MOUNTAIN STATE" centered at top	123-456	1 to approximately 625-000	
	1969–70	As 1963–64 base, but with "70" at bottom right	"MOUNTAIN STATE" centered at top	123-456	1 to approximately 591-000	

=== 1970 to present ===
Image	Dates issued	Design	Slogan	Serial format	Serials issued	Notes
	1970–75	Embossed blue serial on reflective yellow plate with border line; "WEST VIRGINIA" centered at bottom; sticker box at bottom right	"MOUNTAIN STATE" centered at top	0B-1234; AB-1234	First character corresponds to month of expiration (see right)	1 through 9 indicated January through September respectively, and O, N and D indicated October, November and December respectively. This system remains in use today.
	1976–82	Embossed dark blue serial on reflective white plate; yellow state shape with blue outline screened at left behind serial; "WEST VIRGINIA" screened in dark blue centered at bottom	Dark blue bar screened at top with "Wild, Wonderful" in white in the center	0B-1234; AB-1234	First character corresponds to month of expiration	Early plates for August through December manufactured by Polyvend Inc. of Arkansas.
	1982 – December 1994	As above, but without blue outline around state shape	Dark blue bar screened at top with "Wild, Wonderful" in white in the center	0BC-123; ABC-123	First character corresponds to month of expiration	Two-letter series introduced for each month as one-letter series were exhausted. These series progressed as follows: both letters A through M only, then first letter N through Z and second letter A through M, then first letter A through M and second letter N through Z.
	January 1995 – December 2000	Embossed dark blue serial on reflective white plate; dark blue bar screened at top containing "West Virginia" in gold in the center; thin gold stripe screened between dark blue bar and serial	"Wild, Wonderful" screened in dark blue centered at bottom, with three stripes (two dark blue and one gold) screened on either side	0B 1234; 0BC 123; 01B 123; AB 1234; ABC 123; A1B 123	First character corresponds to month of expiration	Series reset to A for all months; progression is as before but with two-letter series progressing in standard order (AA–AZ, BA–BZ etc.). Series S and SA–SZ reserved for optional Scenic plates. Number-letter series introduced October 2015 as two-letter series started to be exhausted.
	December 2000 – early 2006	Embossed dark blue serial on reflective white plate; dark blue bar screened at top containing "West Virginia" in gold in the center; thin gold stripe screened between dark blue bar and serial	"Wild, Wonderful" as before, plus "www.callwva.com" in dark blue between state name and serial, cutting off thin gold stripe in the middle	0B 1234; 0BC 123; 01B 123; AB 1234; ABC 123; A1B 123	First character corresponds to month of expiration	Series reset to A for all months; progression is as before but with two-letter series progressing in standard order (AA–AZ, BA–BZ etc.). Series S and SA–SZ reserved for optional Scenic plates. Number-letter series introduced October 2015 as two-letter series started to be exhausted.
	early 2006 – July 2023	Embossed dark blue serial on reflective white plate; dark blue bar screened at top containing "West Virginia" in gold in the center; thin gold stripe screened between dark blue bar and serial	"Wild, Wonderful"	0B 1234; 0BC 123; 01B 123; AB 1234; ABC 123; A1B 123	First character corresponds to month of expiration	Series reset to A for all months; progression is as before but with two-letter series progressing in standard order (AA–AZ, BA–BZ etc.). Series S and SA–SZ reserved for optional Scenic plates. Number-letter series introduced October 2015 as two-letter series started to be exhausted.
	July 2023 – present	Embossed dark blue serial on reflective white plate with state outline as separator; dark blue bar screened at top containing "West Virginia" in gold in the center; thin gold stripe screened between dark blue bar and serial	"Wild, Wonderful"	012 345B; A12 345B	First character corresponds to month of expiration	

== Optional plates ==
Image	Type	Dates issued	Design	Slogan	Serial format	Serials issued	Notes
	Scenic	1996–2020's	Embossed dark blue serial on reflective graphic plate with mountain scene featuring white and orange sky, pale blue mountains and dark blue forest; "West Virginia" screened in dark blue centered at top	"Wild, Wonderful" screened in dark blue centered at bottom	0S 1234; 0SC 123; AS 1234; ASC 123	First character corresponds to month of expiration	Similar monthly serial formats to standard passenger base, but with series progressing S, then SA, SB, SC etc. "www.callwva.com" appeared between state name and serial during the early and mid-2000s.
	250 Years of Freedom	May 2026–present	Embossed white serial on reflective graphic plate with mountain scene featuring dark blue sky, fireworks, flag of the United States, and the New River Gorge Bridge; "West Virginia" screened in white centered on top.	"Celebrating 250 Years of Freedom" screened in white on red at top	J/4 1234	J/4 0001 to J/4 1601 (As of May 22, 2026)	J/4 for July 4th.
	9/11	2002–present	Embossed black serial on reflective white plate; "West Virginia" screened in white against national flag motif at top; "September 11, 2001" screened in black centered at bottom	"We will not Forget..." screened in black at left	9/11 12345	9/11 0001 to 9/11 19605 (As of May 22, 2026)	
	Sesquicentennial	2012–2020's	Screened dark blue serial on reflective gradient gold plate; state seal at left and state shape at right; "West Virginia" screened in dark blue centered at top	"Wild & Wonderful for 150 Years!" screened in dark blue centered at bottom	S/Q123456	S/Q000001 to S/Q069999	Commemorates West Virginia's 150 years as a separate state.
