= Vehicle registration plates of American Samoa =

American Samoan license plates

American Samoa
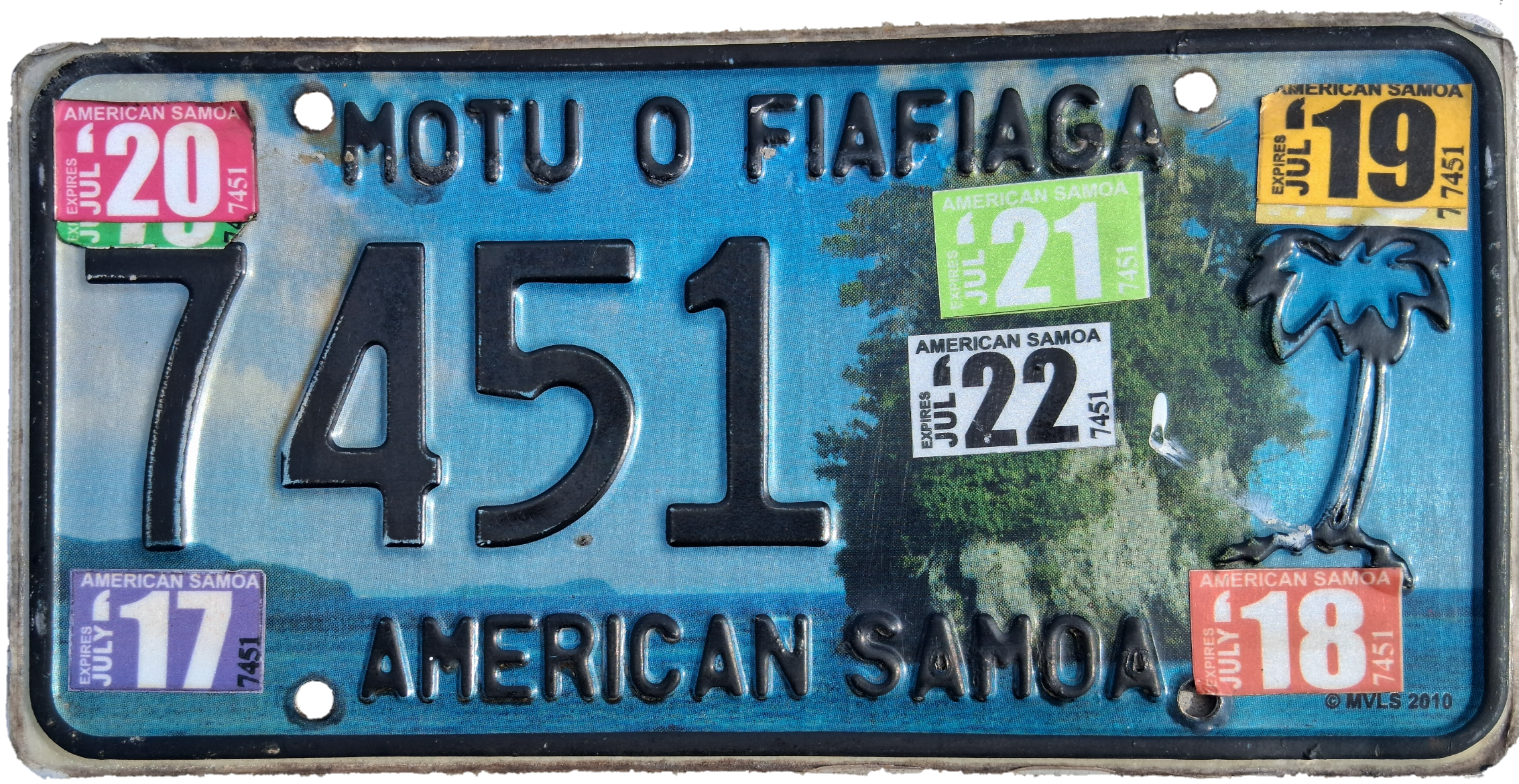
- Current base, featuring Fatu Rock
- Country: American Samoa, USA
- Country code: USA

Current series
- Slogan: Motu O Fiafiaga (Island of Paradise)
- Size: 12 in × 6 in 30 cm × 15 cm
- Material: Aluminum
- Serial format: 1234
- Introduced: 2011

History
- First issued: 1924

The U.S. unincorporated territory of American Samoa first required its residents to register their motor vehicles and display license plates in 1924.

In 1956, the United States, Canada, and Mexico came to an agreement with the American Association of Motor Vehicle Administrators, the Automobile Manufacturers Association, and the National Safety Council that standardized the size for license plates for vehicles (except those for motorcycles) at 6 inches (15 cm) in height by 12 inches (30 cm) in width, with standardized mounting holes. American Samoa adopted these standards in 1977.

== Baseplates ==
=== 1927 to 1969 ===
Image	Date issued	Design	Slogan	Serial format	Serials issued	Notes
	1927	black on white	none			
	1945	white on blue	none	12–45		
	1946	white on dark green	none	12–46		
12-47	1947	white on red	none	12–47		
12-48	1948	blue on yellow	none	12–48		
12-49	1949	black on white	none	12–49		
12-50	1950	white on blue	none	12–50		
12-51	1951	orange on dark blue	none	12–51		
123	1952	black on yellow	none	123	1 to approximately 150	
123	1954	white on dark blue	none	123	1 to approximately 150	
123	1955	white on red	none	123		
123	1956	blue on white	none	123	1 to approximately 140	
123	1957	white on black	none	123		
123	1958	white on red	none	123		
123	1959	red on yellow	none	123		
123	1960	white on dark green	none	123		
123	1961	white on orange	none	123	1 to approximately 130	
	1962	black on white	none	123		
123	1963	olive green on white	none	123	1 to approximately 200	
123	1964	white on green	none	123	1 to approximately 380	
123	1965	white on red	none	123	1 to approximately 590	
	1966	white on blue	none	123	1 to approximately 560	
123	1967	white on green	Pago Pago Motu O Fiafia (Eng. Island of Celebration)	123	1 to approximately 790	
1234	1968	green on white	Pago Pago Motu O Fiafia	1234	1 to approximately 1200	
	1969	black on yellow	Pago Pago Motu O Fiafia	1234	1 to approximately 1500	

=== 1970 to present ===
Image	Dates issued	Design	Slogan	Serial format	Serials issued	Notes
	1970–72	white on dark blue	Pago Pago Motu O Fiafiaga (Eng. Island of Paradise)	1234	0001 to 3000	
	1973–76	red on white	Pago Pago Motu O Fiafiaga (Eng. Island of Paradise)	1234	0001 to 4200	
	1977–79	dark blue on reflective white	Motu O Fiafiaga (Eng. Island of Paradise)	1234	0001 to 4000	First 6" x 12" plate.
	1980–87	white on reflective green	Motu O Fiafiaga (Eng. Island of Paradise)	1234	0001 to 9999	
	1988–95	black on reflective white	Motu O Fiafiaga (Eng. Island of Paradise)	1234	0001 to 9999	
	1996–98	black on reflective yellow	Motu O Fiafiaga (Eng. Island of Paradise)	1234	0001 to 9999	
	1999–2010	blue on reflective white	Centennial 2000	1234	0001 to 9999	
	2000	black on reflective yellow	Centennial 2000			government
	2010	blue on reflective white	Motu O Fiafiaga (Eng. Island of Paradise)	1234		narrow dies
	2011–present	black on reflective graphic featuring Fatu Rock	Motu O Fiafiaga (Eng. Island of Paradise)	1234	0001 to 9999	

== Non-passenger plates ==
Image	Type	First issued	Design	Serial format	Serials issued	Notes
	Agriculture	unknown	Same design as passenger plates	AC 123		

Image	Type	First issued	Design	Serial format	Serials issued	Notes
	Rental car	unknown	Same design as passenger plates	R 123		
