= Vehicle registration plates of Guam =

Guam vehicle license plates

Guam
- Country: United States
- Country code: USA

Current series
- Slogan: Tano Y Chamorro
- Size: 12 in × 6 in 30 cm × 15 cm
- Material: Aluminum
- Serial format: AB 1234 (coded by municipality)
- Introduced: February 27, 2009

History
- First issued: 1916

The U.S. unincorporated territory of Guam first required its residents to register their motor vehicles and display license plates in 1916.

In 1956, the United States, Canada, and Mexico came to an agreement with the American Association of Motor Vehicle Administrators, the Automobile Manufacturers Association and the National Safety Council that standardized the size for license plates for vehicles (except those for motorcycles) at 6 inches (15 cm) in height by 12 inches (30 cm) in width, with standardized mounting holes. Guam adopted these standards in 1960.

Vehicle registration is handled by the Guam Department of Revenue and Taxation, though the service is accessed through the Guam Department of Public Works compound since it was moved there in 2021.

== Passenger baseplates ==
=== 1947 to 1964 ===
Image	Dates issued	Design	Serial format	Serials issued	Notes
	1947	Hand-stenciled black on white; "GUAM" at left and "1947" at right	1234	1 to approximately 2200	
	1948	Embossed black on golden yellow with border line; "GUAM" at left and "1948" at right	1234	1 to approximately 4200	First embossed plate.
	1949	Embossed white on blue with border line; "GUAM" at left and "1949" at right	1234	1 to approximately 8500	
	1950–51	Embossed orange on black with border line; "GUAM" at left and "1950" at right	1234	1 to approximately 9900	Revalidated for 1951 with silver tabs.
	1952–54	Embossed black on orange with border line; "GUAM" at left and "1952" at right	12345	1 to approximately 13800	Revalidated for 1953 with silver tabs, and for 1954 with black tabs.
	1955–56	Embossed white on dark green with border line; "GUAM" at left and "1955" at right	12345	1 to approximately 14000	Revalidated for 1956 with black tabs.
	1957–58	Embossed black on yellow with border line; "GUAM" at left and "1957" at right	12-345	1 to approximately 14-800	Revalidated for 1958 with black tabs.
	1959	Embossed white on dark green with border line; "GUAM" at left and "1959" at right	12-345	1 to approximately 13-900	
	1960	Embossed black on white with border line; "19 GUAM 60" at bottom	12-345	1 to approximately 14-000	First 6" x 12" plate.
	1961	Embossed white on black with border line; "19 GUAM 61" at bottom	12-345	1 to approximately 14-100	
	1962	Embossed black on orange with border line; "19 GUAM 62" at bottom	12-345	1 to approximately 17-900	
	1963	Embossed black on white with border line; "19 GUAM 63" at bottom	12-345	1 to approximately 20-000	
	1964	Embossed white on blue with border line; "19 GUAM 64" at bottom	12345	1 to approximately 17500	

=== 1965 to present ===
Since 1996, all passenger plates have featured a round mounting hole at the top right and horizontal slots in the other three corners, as with plates of Hawaii and the Northern Marianas.

Image	Dates issued	Design	Slogan	Serial format	Serials issued	Notes
	1965–69	Embossed blue on white with border line	Hafa Adai	12345	1 to approximately 38800	
	1970–73	Embossed golden yellow on dark green with border line; latte stone graphics at left and right	America's Day Begins In Guam USA	12345	1 to approximately 55200	
	1974–77	Embossed black on reflective white with border line; "74" at bottom left	Hafa Adai	12-345	1 to approximately 57-500	
	1977–78	Embossed black on reflective white with border line; "74" at bottom left	Hafa Adai	12345	57501 to approximately 61000	
	1978–80	As above, but without "74"	Hafa Adai	12345	61001 to approximately 72500	
	1980–82	As above, but with shorter dies	Hafa Adai	12345	72501 to approximately 83500	
	1983–86	Embossed blue on reflective white with border line; ox cart graphic at bottom left	Hub of the Pacific	12345	1 to approximately 87000	
	1986–93	Embossed dark green on reflective white; graphic in center featuring pale green map and two green latte stones	Hafa Adai	ABC 123	AAA 001 to approximately AFN 999	
	1994 – February 26, 2009	Embossed black on reflective white; gold map graphic in center	Tano Y Chamorro	Coded by municipality: ABC1234 (variable number of digits following letters); ABC123A (following exhaustion of above format)	Varies by village: ABC 1 to ABC9999; ABC001A to present	
	February 27, 2009 – present	Embossed black on reflective white; graphic in center featuring gray latte stone and three red bougainvillea flowers	Tano Y Chamorro	Coded by municipality: AB 1234		

== Coding ==
=== Passenger, 1994 ===
On the 1994 base, the letters of passenger plate serials indicated the village of issuance. These three-letter codes were displayed in a smaller font size than was the numerical portion of the plate serial.

Village	Code
Agana	AGA
Agat	AGT
Agana Heights	AHT
Asan-Maina	ASA
Barrigada	BAR
Chalan Pago	CHP
Dededo	DED
Inarajan	INA
Maite	MAI
Mangilao	MAN
Merizo	MER
Mongmong	MNG
Ordot	ORD
Piti	PIT
Sinajana	SNJ
Santa Rita	STR
Talofofo	TAL
Tamuning	TAM
Toto	TOT
Tumon	TUM
Umatac	UMA
Yigo	YIG
Yona	YON

On the 2009 base, the letters of passenger plate serials again indicate the village of issuance. These two-letter codes are displayed in the same font size as is the numerical portion of the plate serial.

Village	Code
Agat	AT
Asan-Maina	AN
Barrigada	BR
Dededo	DE
Hagåtña	HG
Inarajan	IN
Maite	ME
Mangilao	MN
MongMong	MG
Merizo	MZ
Ordot	OR
Piti	PT
Talofofo	TL
Toto	TO
Tumon	TU
Tamuning	TM
Umatac	UM
Yigo	YG
Yona	YN

=== Non-passenger ===
On the 1994 base, commercial truck plates were coded by location of issuance, but using a different geographical coding system than for passenger plates. These codes were based on more specific geographical areas or geographical features, rather than political jurisdictions.

Bus, dealer, taxi, and trailer plates were coded only by type, not location of issuance.

Image	Type	Serial format	Code	Location
	Commercial Truck	1234ABC	FAP	Fort Apugan (Hagåtña)
	Commercial Truck	1234ABC	FSO	Fort Soledad, Umatac
	Commercial Truck	1234ABC	MLL	Mount Lamlam
	Commercial Truck	1234ABC	PDE	Plaza de España (Hagåtña)
	Commercial Truck	1234ABC	TFL	Talofofo Falls, Talofofo
	Commercial Truck	1234ABC	TLP	Two Lovers Point (Tumon)
	Bus	BUS 123	BUS	all
	Dealer	DLR 123	DLR	all
	Government of Guam	1234	none	all
	Taxi	TXI 123	TXI	all
	Trailer	1234 TRL	TRL	all

== Optional plates ==
Image	Type	First issued	Design	Serial format	Notes
	Veteran—United States Air Force		Blue on reflective white with full-color graphics of the flag of the United States and the flag of Guam	AF 123	
	Veteran—United States Navy		Blue on reflective white with full-color graphics of the flag of the United States and the flag of Guam	N 123	

== Other plates ==
Image	Type	First issued	Design	Slogan	Serial format	Notes
	Consular	1986	As 1986–93 passenger base	Hafa Adai		
	Naval Base	1960	White on yellow		1234	
