= Vehicle registration plates of the United States for 1931 =

1931 license plates in the United States

Vehicle registration plates of the United States by year
Vehicle registration plates of the United States for 1930	Events of 1931	Vehicle registration plates of the United States for 1932

Each of the 48 states of the United States of America plus several of its territories and the District of Columbia issued individual passenger license plates for 1931.

== Passenger baseplates ==
Passenger Car Plates
Image	Region	Design	Slogan	Serial format	Serials issued	Notes
	Alabama					
	Alaska					
	American Samoa					
	Arizona					
	Arkansas					
	California					
	Canal Zone					
	Colorado					
	Connecticut					
	Delaware					
	District of Columbia					
	Florida					
	Georgia					
	Guam					
	Hawai'i					
	Idaho					
	Illinois					
	Indiana					
	Iowa					
	Kansas					
	Kentucky					Plates with an initial star (*) are truck plates.
	Louisiana					
	Maine					
	Maryland					
	Massachusetts					
	Michigan					
	Minnesota					
	Mississippi	Embossed white lettering and border on orange base; "MISS 1931" centered at bottom	none	1-234; 12-345; 123-456	1 to approximately 245-000	
	Missouri					
	Montana					
	Nebraska	Red on gray; "1931 NEB" at right	none	1-12345; 10-1234	Coded by county of issuance (1 or 10)	
	Nevada					
	New Hampshire					
	New Jersey					
	New Mexico					
	New York					
	North Carolina					
	North Dakota					
	Northern Mariana; Islands					
	Ohio					
	Oklahoma					
	Oregon					
	Pennsylvania					
	Puerto Rico					
	Rhode Island					
	South Carolina					
	South Dakota					
	Tennessee					
	Texas					
	Utah					
	Vermont					
	Virginia					
	Washington					
	West Virginia					
	Wisconsin	Embossed yellow serial on dark blue plate; vertical "WIS" at left, weight class over "31" at right	none	123-456A	Coded by weight class	Weight classes are A, B, C, D, and E. Weight classes were dropped after 1931.
	Wyoming					

== Non-passenger plates ==
Non-passenger Plates
Image (standard)	Region	Type	Design & Slogan	Serial format	Serials issued	Notes
	Wisconsin	City bus	Embossed yellow serial on dark blue plate; unknown format		Coded by weight class	
	Wisconsin	Dealer	Embossed yellow serial on dark blue plate; vertical "WIS" at right; embossed solid star over "31" at left	1234A	Dealer number and plate number	The number is the dealer number, the letter is the plate number for that dealer
	Wisconsin	Interurban Bus	Embossed yellow serial on dark blue plate; unknown format		Coded by weight class	
	Wisconsin	Motorcycle	Embossed yellow serial on dark blue plate; unknown format	A1234	A 1 to approximately A1000	Used on regular motorcycles
	Wisconsin	Motorcycle	Embossed yellow serial on dark blue plate; unknown format	B123	B 1 to approximately B500	Used on motorcycles with sidecars
	Wisconsin	Municipal	Embossed blue serial on yellow plate; vertical "WIS" at left, vertical "1931" at left	1234	1 to approximately 5200	Motorcycle version also available
	Wisconsin	Trailer	Embossed red serial on cream plate; "30" over "31" at left, vertical "TRALR" between date and serial; vertical "WIS" at right	A 12	Coded by weight class	Weight classes same as truck
	Wisconsin	Truck	Embossed red serial on cream plate; vertical "WIS" at right "30" over "31" at left	A12345	Coded by weight class	Weight classes were A, B, C, D, E, and F

== See also ==
- Antique vehicle registration
- Electronic license plate
- Motor vehicle registration
- Vehicle license
