= Vehicle registration plates of the United States for 1930 =

1930 license plates in the United States

Vehicle registration plates of the United States by year
Vehicle registration plates of the United States for 1929	Events of 1930	Vehicle registration plates of the United States for 1931

Many of the 48 states of the United States of America plus several of its territories and the District of Columbia issued individual passenger license plates for the year 1930.

== Passenger baseplates ==
Passenger Car Plates
Image	Region	Design	Slogan	Serial format	Serials issued	Notes
	Alabama		none			
	Alaska					
	Arizona					
	Arkansas					
	California	black on orange	"none"	1A-23-45		
	Canal Zone	Embossed black lettering on yellow background	"none"	1234		
	Colorado	Orange lettering on black base	"none"	12-34-56		Issued in blocks by county
	Connecticut					
	Delaware					
	District of Columbia					
	Florida	Embossed white numbers on dark green plate with border line; "FLORIDA–1930" embossed in white block letters at bottom	"none"	123-456	1 to approximately 324–000	
	Georgia					
	Guam					
	Idaho					
	Illinois	White embossed serial number and border on black base; "ILL 30" at far right				
	Indiana					
	Iowa					
	Kansas					
	Kentucky	Pair of plates, each with white base with red embossed lettering and border. Front: top of plate emblazoned with "19 KENTUCKY 30" with county name at bottom and registration digits in center. Rear: top of plate emblazoned with "19 KENTUCKY 30" with registration in center of plate and "FOR PROGRESS" emblazoned at bottom.	"KENTUCKY FOR PROGRESS" as noted	123-456	unknown	Different front and rear plates issued as noted.
	Louisiana	Green base with embossed yellow block lettering and border. "FRONT" and "REAR" embossed at left.	"none"	123-456		Different front and rear plates as noted.
	Maine					
	Maryland	Embossed white lettering and rims on green base. "MARYLAND 1930" at top.	"none"	123-456		
	Massachusetts	Embossed white lettering on brown base. "MASS – 1930" at bottom.	"none"	123 456		
	Michigan	Black on yellow; "MICHIGAN 1930" at bottom	"none"			
	Minnesota	Embossed black lettering and rims on gray base.				
	Mississippi	Navy base with embossed red lettering and rim. "MISS 1930" stamped under registration.	"none"	123-456		
	Missouri	White lettering on brown base	"none"			
	Montana	Embossed black lettering and rims on orange base. "MONTANA 1930" at bottom.	"none"	12-345		
	Nebraska	Embossed yellow lettering and rims on black base. "NEB 1930" embossed at right.	"none"	1–2345; 12-3456		County-coded (1 or 10)
	Nevada	Embossed orange lettering and rims on black base. "NEVADA 1930" embossed at bottom.	"none"			
	New Hampshire		"none"	12-345		
	New Jersey	White lettering embossed on brown base	A12345			County letter code at left.
	New Mexico	Embossed golden yellow numbers on black plate with border line; embossed golden yellow Zia sun symbol at left with "30" in the center; "NEW MEXICO" embossed in golden yellow block letters centered at bottom.	"none"	12-345	1 to approximately 71-000	
	New York	Yellow-orange lettering on embossed black base	"none"			
	North Carolina	Brown base with white lettering	"none"	123-456		
	North Dakota	Embossed navy lettering on orange base. "ND" embossed at left and "30" embossed at right.	"none"	12-345		
	Ohio	Embossed white lettering on crimson base. "OHIO – 1930" at bottom.	"none"	A12345; 123-546		
	Oklahoma					
	Oregon					
	Pennsylvania	Blue embossed lettering and border on yellow base	"none"	12A34		State name abbreviated "PENNA." Keystone logos on either side of date and state name.
	Puerto Rico	Black embossed lettering and on gray base. "PR" at right and "1930 – 1931" at bottom.	"none"	AB 1234		
	Rhode Island	Embossed white lettering and rims on black base. "RHODE ISLAND 1930" at bottom.	"none"			
	South Carolina					
	South Dakota	Embossed black lettering and rims on yellow base. "SD" embossed at left and "30" at right.	"none"	123-456		
	Tennessee					
	Texas	Embossed black lettering and rims on yellow base. "TEXAS – 1933" at top. Star separator at center.	123-456; 1-234-567			Front and rear plates issued, with "FRONT" and "REAR" embossed at left on plates.
	Utah	Embossed white lettering and border on black base. "UTAH 30" embossed at right.	"none"	12-345	1 to approximately 93–500	
	Vermont					
	Virginia					
	Washington					
	West Virginia	Embossed black numbers on gray plate; "W. VA. – 1930" embossed in black block letters centered at bottom	"none"	123-456	1 to approximately 223–000	
	Wisconsin	Embossed black serial on light gray plate; vertical "WIS" at right, weight class over "30" at left	none	A123-456	Coded by weight class	Weight classes are A, B, C, D, and E
	Wyoming	Embossed white numbers on black plate; white lines at top and bottom borders; "WYOMING 1930" embossed in white block letters at bottom	"none"	1-1234; 10-1234		County-coded (1 or 10)

== Non-passenger plates ==
Non-passenger Plates
Image (standard)	Region	Type	Design & Slogan	Serial format	Serials issued	Notes
	Wisconsin	City bus	Embossed black serial on light gray plate; unknown format		Coded by weight class	
	Wisconsin	Dealer	Embossed black serial on light gray plate; vertical "WIS" at right; embossed solid star over "30" at left	1234A	Dealer number and plate number	Number is dealer number, letter is plate number for that dealer
	Wisconsin	Duplicate	Embossed black serial on light gray plate; vertical "WIS" at right, weight class over "30" at left; vertical "AUTO" between year and serial, vertical "DUPL" between serial and "WIS"	A 123	Coded by weight class	
	Wisconsin	Interurban bus	Embossed black serial on light gray plate; unknown format		Coded by weight class	
	Wisconsin	Motorcycle	Embossed black serial on light gray plate; vertical "WIS" at right, letter code over "30" at left	A1234	A 1 to approximately A2000	Used on regular motorcycles
	Wisconsin	Motorcycle	Embossed black serial on light gray plate; vertical "WIS" at right, letter code over "30" at left	B123	B 1 to approximately B400	Used on motorcycles with sidecars
	Wisconsin	Municipal	Embossed black serial on light gray plate; vertical "WIS at right, vertical "1930" at left; "M" in circle in center, splitting serial in half	12 34	10 01 to approximately 36 00	Plates with leading zeroes found; it is unknown if they are real plates or samples. Motorcycle version also available
	Wisconsin	Trailer	Embossed black serial on light gray plate; unknown format		Coded by weight class	
	Wisconsin	Truck	Embossed black serial on light gray plate; vertical "WIS" at right, weight class over "30" at left; vertical "TRUCK" between year and serial	A 12-345	Coded by weight class	Weight classes are A, B, C, D, E, and F

== See also ==
- Antique vehicle registration
- Electronic license plate
- Motor vehicle registration
- Vehicle license
