= Vehicle registration plates of the United States for 1920 =

1920 license plates in the United States

Vehicle registration plates of the United States by year
| Vehicle registration plates of the United States for 1919 | Events of 1920 | Vehicle registration plates of the United States for 1921 |

Each of the 48 states of the United States of America plus several of its territories and the District of Columbia issued individual passenger license plates for 1920.

== Passenger baseplates ==
| Legend: | Regular state issue plate(s) | No plates issued by state or territory |

Passenger Car Plates
| Image | Region | Design | Slogan | Serial format | Serials issued | Notes |
|---|---|---|---|---|---|---|
| | Alabama | | | | | |
| | Alaska | | | | | No prestate plates. State issued plates begin in 1921. |
| | American Samoa | | | | | Territory issued plates begin in 1924. |
| | Arizona | | | | | |
| | Arkansas | | | | | |
| | California | | | | | |
| | Canal Zone | | | | | |
| | Canal Zone | | | | | |
| | Colorado | | none | | | Blue and red tab on 1919 plate. |
| | Colorado | | none | | | Issued for new registrations only. |
| | Connecticut | | | | | |
| | Delaware | | | | | |
| | District of Columbia | | | | | |
| | Florida | | | | | |
| | Georgia | | | | | |
| | Guam | | | | | |
| | Hawai'i | | | | | No prestate plates. Territory issued plates begin in 1922. |
| | Idaho | | | | | |
| | Illinois | | | | | |
| | Indiana | | | | | |
| | Iowa | Embossed black serial on light green plate with border line; "IA 20" at right | none | 123456 | 1 to approximately 438000 | |
| | Kansas | | | | | |
| | Kentucky | | | | | |
| | Louisiana | | | | | |
| | Maine | | | | | |
| | Maryland | | | | | |
| | Massachusetts | | | | | |
| | Michigan | | | | | |
| | Minnesota | | | | | |
| | Mississippi | | | | | |
| | Missouri | Embossed black serial on light green plate with border line; "MO. 1920" at bottom | | | | |
| | Montana | | | | | |
| | Nebraska | | | | | Revalidated for 1920 with dark blue tab on top of a 1919 plate. |
| | Nevada | | | | | |
| | New Hampshire | | | | | |
| | New Jersey | | | | | |
| | New Mexico | | | | | |
| | New York | | | | | |
| | North Carolina | Embossed black serial on yellow plate with border line; "N.C. 6-30 1920" at left | none | 12-345; 123456 | 1 to approximately 106000 | |
| | North Dakota | | | | | |
| | Northern Mariana; Islands | | | | | No prestate plates. Territory issued plates begin in 1944. |
| | Ohio | | | | | |
| | Oklahoma | | | | | |
| | Oregon | | | | | |
| | Pennsylvania | | | | | |
| | Puerto Rico | | | | | |
| | Rhode Island | | | | | |
| | South Carolina | | | | | |
| | South Dakota | | | | | |
| | Tennessee | | | | | |
| | Texas | | | | | |
| | Utah | | | | | |
| | Vermont | | | | | |
| | Virgin Islands | | | | | |
| | Virginia | | | | | |
| | Washington | | | | | |
| | West Virginia | | | | | |
| | Wisconsin | Embossed white serial on maroon plate; "W" over "20" at right | none | 123456 | 1 to approximately 275000 | |
| | Wyoming | | | | | |

== Non-passenger plates ==
Non-passenger Plates
| Image (standard) | Region | Type | Design & Slogan | Serial format | Serials issued | Notes |
|---|---|---|---|---|---|---|
| | Wisconsin | Dealer | Embossed white serial on maroon plate; "W" over "20" at right; embossed solid star at left | 1234A | Dealer number and plate number | |
| | Wisconsin | Motorcycle | Embossed white serial on maroon plate; "W" over "20" at right; serial embossed at 45-degree angle | 1234 | 1 to approximately 7200 | |
| | Wisconsin | Truck | Embossed white serial on maroon plate; "W" over "20" at right; vertical "TRUCK" at left | 1234 | 1 to approximately 15100 | |

== See also ==
- Antique vehicle registration
- Electronic license plate
- Motor vehicle registration
- Vehicle license
