= Vehicle registration plates of the United States for 1939 =

1939 license plates in the United States

Vehicle registration plates of the United States by year
Vehicle registration plates of the United States for 1938	Events of 1939	Vehicle registration plates of the United States for 1940

Each of the 48 states of the United States of America plus several of its territories and the District of Columbia issued individual passenger license plates for 1939.

== Passenger baseplates ==
Passenger Car Plates
Image	Region	Design	Slogan	Serial format	Serials issued	Notes
	Alabama					
	Alaska					
	American Samoa					
	Arizona					
	Arkansas					
	California					
	Canal Zone					
	Colorado					
	Connecticut					
	Delaware					
	District of Columbia					
	Florida					
	Georgia					
	Guam					
	Hawai'i					
	Idaho					
	Illinois					
	Indiana					
	Iowa					
	Kansas	Embossed black serial on white plate with border line; "'39 KAN." centered at top	None	1-12345; 10-1234; 100-123	Coded by county of issuance (1, 10 or 100)	
	Kentucky					
	Louisiana					
	Maine					
	Maryland					
	Massachusetts					
	Michigan					
	Minnesota					
	Mississippi					
	Missouri					
	Montana					
	Nebraska					
	Nevada					
	New Hampshire					
	New Jersey					
	New Mexico					
	New York					
	North Carolina					
	North Dakota	Embossed red serial on white plate with border line; vertical "ND" and "1939" at left and right respectively	none	123-456	1 to approximately 142-000	
	Northern Mariana; Islands					
	Ohio					
	Oklahoma	Embossed black serial on silver plate with border line; "OK–39" at bottom, offset to right	none	A/B123		County-coded (A/B)
	Oregon					
	Pennsylvania					
	Puerto Rico					
	Rhode Island					
	South Carolina					
	South Dakota					
	Tennessee					
	Texas					
	Utah					
	Vermont					
	Virginia					
	Washington					
	West Virginia					
	Wisconsin					
	Wyoming					

== Non-passenger plates ==
Non-passenger Plates
Image (standard)	Region	Type	Design & Slogan	Serial format	Serials issued	Notes
	Wisconsin	Dealer	Embossed white serial on black plate with border line; "1939 DEALER WIS" at top	1234A	Dealer number and plate number	Number is the dealer number, letter is the plate number for that dealer
	Wisconsin	Duplicate	Embossed white serial on black plate with border line; "WISCONSIN 1939" at top, vertical "DUP" at left	1234	1 to approximately 3400	
	Wisconsin	Farm	Embossed golden yellow serial on black plate with border line; "38 FARM TR'K 39" at bottom	12-345	1 to approximately 47-000	
	Wisconsin	Motorcycle	Embossed white serial on black plate with border line; "WIS 39" at top	1234	1 to approximately 3300	
	Wisconsin	Motorcycle dealer	Embossed white serial on black plate with border line; unknown format			
	Wisconsin	Municipal	Embossed black serial on white plate with border line; "WISCONSIN 1939" at top, embossed hollow star at right	1234	1 to approximately 6900	Identifiable with a hollow star
	Wisconsin	Municipal motorcycle	Embossed black serial on white plate with border line; "WIS 39" at top, hollow black star at right	12	1 to unknown	
	Wisconsin	Truck	Embossed golden yellow serial on black plate with border line; "38 WIS TRUCK 39" at bottom	12-345 A	Coded by weight class	Weight classes are A, B, C, D, E, F, G, H, J, K, L, M, and N.

== See also ==
- Antique vehicle registration
- Electronic license plate
- Motor vehicle registration
- Vehicle license
