= Vehicle registration plates of the United States for 1929 =

1929 license plates in the United States

Vehicle registration plates of the United States by year
Vehicle registration plates of the United States for 1928	Events of 1929	Vehicle registration plates of the United States for 1930

Each of the 48 states of the United States of America plus several of its territories and the District of Columbia issued individual passenger license plates for 1929.

== Passenger baseplates ==
Passenger Car Plates
Image	Region	Design	Slogan	Serial format	Serials issued	Notes
	Alabama					
	Alaska					
	American Samoa					
	Arizona					
	Arkansas					
	California					
	Canal Zone					
	Colorado					
	Connecticut					
	Delaware					
	District of Columbia					
	Florida					
	Georgia					
	Guam					
	Hawai'i					
	Idaho					
	Illinois					
	Indiana					
	Iowa					
	Kansas					
	Kentucky					
	Louisiana					
	Maine					
	Maryland					
	Massachusetts					
	Michigan					
	Minnesota					
	Mississippi					
	Missouri	Embossed white serial on black plate with border line; "MO. 1929" centered at bottom	none	123-456	1 to approximately 662-000	
	Montana					
	Nebraska					
	Nevada					
	New Hampshire					
	New Jersey					
	New Mexico					
	New York					
	North Carolina					
	North Dakota					
	Northern Mariana; Islands					
	Ohio					
	Oklahoma					
	Oregon					
	Pennsylvania					
	Puerto Rico					
	Rhode Island					
	South Carolina					
	South Dakota					
	Tennessee					
	Texas					
	Utah					
	Vermont					
	Virginia					
	Washington					
	West Virginia					
	Wisconsin	Embossed white serial on green plate; "WIS" at left, weight class over "29" at right	none	123-456A	Coded by weight class.	Used two different weight class dies. Weight classes were A, B, C, D, and E.
	Wyoming					

== Non-passenger plates ==
Non-passenger Plates
Image (standard)	Region	Type	Design & Slogan	Serial format	Serials issued	Notes
	Wisconsin	City bus	Embossed white serial on green plate; unknown format		Coded by weight class	
	Wisconsin	Dealer	Embossed white serial on green plate; vertical "WIS" over "29" at right; embossed solid star at left	1234A	Dealer number and plate number	The number is the dealer number, the letter is the plate number for that dealer
	Wisconsin	Duplicate	Embossed white serial on green plate; vertical "WIS" over "29" at left; vertical "AUTO" between serial and "WIS", vertical "DUPL" at right	A-123	Coded by weight class	
	Wisconsin	Interurban bus	Embossed white serial on green plate; unknown format		Coded by weight class	
	Wisconsin	Motorcycle	Embossed white serial on green plate; "W" over "29" at right	A1234	A 1 to approximately A1600	Used on regular motorcycles
	Wisconsin	Motorcycle	Embossed white serial on green plate; "W" over "29" at right	B123	B 1 to approximately B400	Used on motorcycles with sidecars
	Wisconsin	Motorcycle dealer	Embossed white serial on green plate; unknown format			
	Wisconsin	Municipal	Embossed white serial on red plate; vertical "WIS" at right	1234	1 to approximately 3100	Undated issue from 1924-1929; motorcycle version also available
	Wisconsin	Municipal motorcycle	Embossed white serial on red plate; unknown format	123	1 to approximately 150	
	Wisconsin	Trailer	Embossed white serial on green plate; unknown format of "WIS" and "TRAILER" at left	A123	Coded by weight class	
	Wisconsin	Truck	Embossed white serial on green plate; vertical "WIS" at left, weight class over "29" at right; vertical "TRUCK" between "WIS" and serial	12-345A	Coded by weight class.	Two sets of weight class dies were used. Weight classes are A, B, C, D, E, and F.

== See also ==
- Antique vehicle registration
- Electronic license plate
- Motor vehicle registration
- Vehicle license
