= Vehicle registration plates of the United States for 1938 =

1938 license plates in the United States

Vehicle registration plates of the United States by year
Vehicle registration plates of the United States for 1937	Events of 1938	Vehicle registration plates of the United States for 1939

Each of the 48 states of the United States of America plus several of its territories and the District of Columbia issued individual passenger license plates for 1938.

== Passenger baseplates ==
Passenger car plates
Image	Region	Design	Slogan	Serial format	Serials issued	Notes
	Alabama	Red serial on blue background with embossed "38" in the top right-hand corner.	none	123–456_{A}		
	Alaska					
	Arizona					
	Arkansas	Embossed gray lettering, designs and border on red background, "ARKANSAS" embossed in winged signage below registration; "38" embossed inside state shape at left.	none	123–456		
	California	black embossed lettering on yellow base	1A 23 45	unknown		
	Canal Zone	Embossed white lettering on red background	none	12345		
	Colorado	White embossed lettering and rims on teal base.	none	1-12345; 10-1234		County coded registration (1 or 10).
	Connecticut					
	Delaware					
	District of Columbia					
	Florida	Embossed yellow lettering and border on black background, "19 FLORIDA 38" embossed at top.	none	12A3456	Coded by county and weight class	
	Georgia	Orange embossed lettering and rims on blue base. "1938" embossed at bottom and "GEORGIA" at top.	none	123-456A	unknown	
	Guam					
	Hawai'i	Embossed yellow lettering on black base; "HAWAII 1938" at bottom.	none	12-345		
	Idaho	Embossed white letters and rims on maroon base. "IDAHO - 1938" at bottom.	none	1-2345, 12-3456	unknown	
	Illinois	Embossed white lettering on green base; "ILLINOIS 1938" at bottom.	none	123 456; 123 4567	unknown	
	Indiana	Maroon lettering on cream base	none	123 456		
	Iowa	Black embossed lettering and rims on white base.	none	1–2345; 12-3456		County-coded registration (1 or 12)
	Kansas	Embossed white numbers on black plate with border line; "KAN. '38" embossed in white block letters centered at bottom	none	1-12345; 10-1234; 100-123	Coded by county (1, 10 or 100)	
	Kentucky					
	Louisiana					
	Maine					
	Maryland					
	Massachusetts	Embossed white lettering on red base. "MASS 38" at bottom.	none	123–456		
	Michigan		none	123456		
	Minnesota		none	A123-456		
	Mississippi	Dark blue with embossed white lettering and rim. "MISS." stamped at top center of plate, "38" at top right. Passenger plates stamped with "A" at top left.	none	123–456		
	Missouri	Embossed black lettering and rims on white base. "19 MISSOURI 38" at bottom.	none	123–456	unknown	
	Montana	Embossed black numbers on orange plate with state-shaped border; embossed black buffalo skull used as separator; "MONTANA–38" embossed in black block letters below numbers	none	1-12345; 1/0-1234	unknown	Coded by county of issuance (1 or 1/0)
	Nebraska	Silver embossed block lettering and rims on black base. "NEBRASKA – 38" embossed at bottom.	none	1-12345; 10-1234	unknown	County-coded registration (1 or 10)
	Nevada	Embossed white lettering and rims on blue base. "NEVADA 1938" at bottom.	none	12-345	unknown	
	New Hampshire	Embossed white lettering and rims on dark green base. "NH 38-9" at top.				
	New Jersey	Embossed white lettering on heavy black steel base. "N.J. 38" embossed at top.	none	A123456		County coded registration (A).
	New Mexico	Embossed black lettering and Zia design on yellow base plate.	none	1–2345; 12-3456	unknown	County-coded registration (1 or 12)
	New York	Yellow-orange embossed lettering on black base	"NEW YORK WORLD"S FAIR 1939" embossed across bottom of plate.	A-12-34; 1A23-45		County-coded registration.
	North Carolina	Yellow base with embossed black lettering. "NORTH CAROLINA 38" embossed at top.	none	123–456	unknown	
	North Dakota					
	Ohio	Black embossed lettering, rims, and graphics on white base	150 Anniv·N·W·Terr·	A·1234; AB·123; 1234·A; 123·AB; A·123·B		County-coded registration. Commemorated the 150th anniversary of the creation of the Northwest Territory, from which the state of Ohio was formed.
	Oklahoma	Embossed black lettering on yellow base. "OKLAHOMA – 1938" at top.	none	123–456	unknown	
	Oregon	Embossed black lettering and rims on silver-painted base. "OREGON – 1938" at bottom.	none	123–456	unknown	
	Pennsylvania	Blue embossed lettering on yellow base with blue state outline	none	1234A; 12A34	unknown	
	Rhode Island	Embossed white letters on black base; "R.I. 1938" embossed at bottom.	none	A1234	unknown	
	South Carolina	Embossed black numbers on golden yellow plate; "SOUTH CAROLINA 38" embossed in black block letters at bottom.	none	A-12-345	unknown	Letter in registration corresponds to weight class.
	South Dakota	Embossed white letters and rims on blue base. "S. DAK. 1938" at bottom.	none	1–2345; 12-3456	unknown	
	Tennessee	Embossed blue lettering and rims on state-shaped plate. "TENN. 38" at bottom center.	none	1–2345; 1A-2345	unknown	Coded by weight.
	Texas	Black embossed lettering, star separator at center, and rims on white base.	none	123–456; A12-345	unknown	
	Utah	Embossed maroon lettering and rims on white base, "UTAH – 1938" at bottom.	none	12-345	50-001 to approximately 174-000	
	Vermont	Embossed blue lettering on white base. "19 VERMONT 38" embossed at bottom.	none	12 435		
	Virginia	Embossed black numbers on white plate; "VIRGINIA – 1938" embossed in black block letters at bottom.	none	123–456	1 to approximately 388-000	
	Washington	Embossed green numbers on white plate with border line; "1938 WASHINGTON" embossed in green block letters at top	none	A-12345; AB-1234	County-coded (A or AB)	
	West Virginia	Embossed yellow numbers on black plate; "W. VA.-37-38" embossed in yellow block letters centered at top.	none			
	Wisconsin	Embossed black numbers on silver plate with border line; "WISCONSIN 1938" embossed in black block letters at bottom	none	123–456	1 to approximately 706-000	
	Wyoming	Embossed yellow numbers and Bucking Horse and Rider on navy blue plate with border line; "1938 WYOMING" embossed in yellow block letters at top	none	1–2345; 12-3456		

== Non-passenger plates ==
Non-passenger plates
Image (standard)	Region	Type	Design and slogan	Serial format	Serials issued	Notes
	Wisconsin	Dealer	Embossed black serial on silver plate with border line; "WIS DEALER 38" at bottom	1234A	Dealer number and plate number	Number is the dealer number, letter is the plate number for that dealer
	Wisconsin	Farm	Embossed black serial on orange plate with border line; "37 FARM TR'K 38" at top, vertical "WIS" at left	12-345	1 to approximately 49-000	
	Wisconsin	Motorcycle	Embossed black serial on silver plate with border line; "WIS 38" at bottom	1234	1 to approximately 3000	
	Wisconsin	Municipal	Embossed silver serial on black plate with border line; "WISCONSIN 1938" at bottom, embossed hollow star at right	1234	1 to approximately 8300	Identifiable with a hollow star
	Wisconsin	Truck	Embossed black serial on orange plate with border line; "37 WIS TRUCK 38" at bottom	12-345 A	Coded by weight class	Weight classes are A, B, C, D, E, F, G, H, J, K, L, M, and N

== See also ==
- Antique vehicle registration
- Electronic license plate
- Motor vehicle registration
- Vehicle license
