= Vehicle registration plates of the United States for 1936 =

1936 license plates in the United States

Vehicle registration plates of the United States by year
Vehicle registration plates of the United States for 1935	Events of 1936	Vehicle registration plates of the United States for 1937

Each of the 48 states of the United States of America plus several of its territories and the District of Columbia issued individual passenger license plates for 1936.

== Passenger baseplates ==
Passenger car plates
Image	Region	Design	Slogan	Serial format	Serials issued	Notes
	Alabama					
	Alaska					
	American Samoa					
	Arizona					
	Arkansas					
	California					
	Canal Zone					
	Colorado					
	Connecticut					
	Delaware					
	District of Columbia					
	Florida					
	Georgia					
	Guam					
	Hawai'i					
	Idaho					
	Illinois					
	Indiana					
	Iowa					
	Kansas					
	Kentucky					
	Louisiana					
	Maine					
	Maryland					
	Massachusetts					
	Michigan					
	Minnesota					
	Mississippi					
	Missouri					
	Montana					
	Nebraska	Silver on black; "NEBRASKA – 36" at bottom	none	1-12345; 10-1234	Coded by county of issuance (1 or 10)	
	Nevada					
	New Hampshire					
	New Jersey					
	New Mexico					
	New York					
	North Carolina					
	North Dakota					
	Northern Mariana; Islands					
	Ohio					
	Oklahoma					
	Oregon					
	Pennsylvania					
	Puerto Rico					
	Rhode Island					
	South Carolina					
	South Dakota					
	Tennessee					
	Texas					
	Utah					
	Vermont					
	Virginia					
	Washington					
	West Virginia					
	Wisconsin	Embossed green serial on white plate with border line; "36 WISCONSIN" at bottom	none	123-456	1 to approximately 670-000	
	Wyoming					

== Non-passenger plates ==
Non-passenger plates
Image (standard)	Region	Type	Design and slogan	Serial format	Serials issued	Notes
	Wisconsin	City bus	Embossed green serial on white plate with border line; unknown format		Coded by weight class	
	Wisconsin	Dealer	Embossed green serial on white plate with border line; "36 DEALER WIS" at bottom	1234A	Dealer number and plate number	Number is the dealer number, letter is the plate number for that dealer
	Wisconsin	Farm	Embossed brown serial on cream plate with border line; "35 FARM TRUCK 36" at top, vertical "WIS" at left	12-345	1 to approximately 56-000	
	Wisconsin	Interurban bus	Embossed green serial on white plate with border line; unknown format		Coded by weight class	
	Wisconsin	Motorcycle	Embossed green serial on white plate with border line; "36 - WIS" at bottom	1234	1 to approximately 2900	
	Wisconsin	Municipal	Embossed white serial on green plate with border line; "36 WISCONSIN" at bottom, embossed hollow star at right	1234	1 to approximately 6400	Identifiable with a hollow star; motorcycle version also available
	Wisconsin	Trailer	Embossed brown serial on cream plate with border line; unknown format	1234 A	Coded by weight class	Weight classes same as truck
	Wisconsin	Truck	Embossed brown serial on cream plate with border line; "35 TRUCK WIS 36" at top	12-345 A	Coded by weight class	Weight classes were A, B, C, D, E, F, G, H, J, K, L, M, and N

== See also ==
- Antique vehicle registration
- Electronic license plate
- Motor vehicle registration
- Vehicle license
