= Vehicle registration plates of the United States for 1940 =

1940 license plates in the United States

Vehicle registration plates of the United States by year
Vehicle registration plates of the United States for 1939	Events of 1940	Vehicle registration plates of the United States for 1941

Each of the 48 states of the United States of America plus several of its territories and the District of Columbia issued individual passenger license plates for 1940.

== Passenger baseplates ==
Passenger Car Plates
Image	Region	Design	Slogan	Serial format	Serials issued	Notes
	Alabama					
	Alaska					
	American Samoa					
	Arizona					
	Arkansas					
	California					
	Canal Zone					
	Colorado					
	Connecticut					
	Delaware					
	District of Columbia					
	Florida					
	Georgia					
	Guam					
	Hawai'i					
	Idaho					
	Illinois					
	Indiana					
	Iowa					
	Kansas	Embossed white serial with border line on black plate; "KANSAS '40" centered at bottom	none	1-1234; 12-1234	Coded by county of issuance (1 or 12)	
	Kentucky					
	Louisiana					
	Maine					
	Maryland					
	Massachusetts					
	Michigan					
	Minnesota					
	Mississippi					
	Missouri					
	Montana					
	Nebraska	Orange on turquoise with State Capitol graphic; "NEBRASKA 40" at bottom	none	1-12345; 10-1234	Coded by county of issuance (1 or 10)	
	Nevada					
	New Hampshire					
	New Jersey					
	New Mexico					
	New York					
	North Carolina					
	North Dakota	Embossed yellow serial on black plate with border line; vertical "ND" and "1940" at left and right respectively	none	123-456	1 to approximately 147-000	
	Northern Mariana; Islands					
	Ohio					
	Oklahoma					
	Oregon					
	Pennsylvania					
	Puerto Rico					
	Rhode Island					
	South Carolina					
	South Dakota					
	Tennessee					
	Texas					
	Utah					
	Vermont					
	Virginia					
	Washington					
	West Virginia					
	Wisconsin					
	Wyoming					Sample plate shown.

== Non-passenger plates ==
Non-passenger Plates
Image (standard)	Region	Type	Design & Slogan	Serial format	Serials issued	Notes
	Wisconsin	City Bus	Embossed red serial on white plate; "CITY" over "BUS" at left, "WISCONSIN 1940" at top, "AMERICA'S DAIRYLAND" at bottom	1 A	Coded by weight class	
	Wisconsin	City Bus	Embossed white serial on dark blue plate with border line; "CITY" over "BUS" at left, "WISCONSIN 1940" at top, "EXP. 3-31-40" at bottom	1 A	Coded by weight class	It is unknown what this plate was used for, other than it is a city bus plate type.
	Wisconsin	Dealer	Embossed red serial on white plate; "WIS DEALER 1940" at top, "AMERICA'S DAIRYLAND" at bottom	1234A	Dealer number and plate number	Number is the dealer number, letter is the plate number for that dealer
	Wisconsin	Farm	Embossed blue serial on yellow plate; "39 FARM TR'K 40" at top, vertical "WIS" at left	12-345	1 to approximately 58-000	
	Wisconsin	Interurban bus	Embossed white serial on dark blue plate; "INT" over "BUS" at left, "WISCONSIN 1940" at top, "EXP. 3-31-40" at bottom	12 A	Coded by weight class	
	Wisconsin	Motorcycle	Embossed red serial on white plate; "1940 WIS" at top	1234	1 to approximately 3200	
	Wisconsin	Municipal	Embossed white serial on red plate; "WISCONSIN 1940" at top, "AMERICA'S DAIRYLAND" at bottom; embossed hollow star at right.	1234	1 to approximately 8800	Identifiable with a hollow star
	Wisconsin	Trailer	Embossed blue serial on yellow plate; "39 WIS TRAILER 40" at top	1234 A	Coded by weight class	Weight classes are same as truck. It is unknown if heavy trailers received green plates like heavy trucks did.
	Wisconsin	Trailer	Embossed yellow serial on blue plate; "WIS TRAILER" at top, "EXP. 3-31-40" at bottom	12 A	Coded by weight class	Weight classes are F, G, H, J, K, L, M, and N. It is unknown what this plate was used for, other than it was used on trailers.
	Wisconsin	Truck	Embossed blue serial on yellow plate; "39 WIS TRUCK 40" at top	12-345 A	Coded by weight class	Weight classes are A, B, C, and D
	Wisconsin	Truck	Embossed white serial on green plate; "39 WIS TRUCK 40" at top	12-345 A	Coded by weight class	Weight classes are E, F, G, H, J, K, L, M, and N.
	Wisconsin	Truck	Embossed yellow serial on blue plate; "WIS TRUCK" at top, "EXP. 3-31-40" at bottom	12 A	Coded by weight class	Weight classes are F, G, H, J, K, L, M, and N. It is unknown what this plate was used for, other than it was a truck plate type.

== See also ==
- Antique vehicle registration
- Electronic license plate
- Motor vehicle registration
- Vehicle license
