= Vehicle registration plates of the United States for 1942 =

1942 license plates in the United States

Vehicle registration plates of the United States by year
Vehicle registration plates of the United States for 1941	Events of 1942	Vehicle registration plates of the United States for 1943

All of the 48 states of the United States of America plus several of its territories and the District of Columbia issued individual passenger license plates dated for the year 1942, and due to metal conservation for World War II, 1943 and 1944 for most states. In 1942, automobile production in the United States was halted for the duration of World War II, and many automobile factories were converted to munitions or other war-oriented industrial manufacturing purposes until 1946.

Most states conserved metal for World War II in some way. Many states stopped issuing front plates, while other states such as Illinois issued license plates made out of soybean fiberboard. Most states either issued plates intended to be revalidated with metal tabs or revalidated license plates with tabs. Some other states, such as Wisconsin, used small plates.

== Passenger baseplates ==
Passenger car plates
Image	Region	Design	Slogan	Serial format	Serials issued	Notes
	Alabama	Embossed yellow lettering and on black base. "ALABAMA 1942" under registration at bottom center.	none	12A 345	unknown	Coded by county of issuance: 0A1-234; 00A1-234
	Alaska	Embossed black lettering on white base. "ALASKA 1942" embossed at bottom.	none	1234		
	Arizona	Embossed black lettering on white base with rounded corners. "ARIZONA 42" embossed at top.	"GRAND CANYON STATE" at bottom center.			
	Arkansas	Embossed orange lettering and rims on black base. "1942" embossed at top; "ARKANSAS" embossed at bottom center.	none	123–456	unknown	
	California	Embossed yellow lettering on black base. "19 CALIFORNIA 41" embossed at top.	none	1A 23 45; 12 A 345	unknown	Embossed black-on-yellow "19 CALIFORNIA 42" renewal tabs to cover top lettering issued for wartime metal shortages.
	Canal Zone	Embossed white lettering on navy base. "1942" embossed at top; "CANAL ZONE" at bottom.	none	12345		
	Colorado	Embossed white lettering and rims on maroon base. "19 COLORADO 42" embossed at top.	none	1-12345; 12-1234	unknown	County-coded registration
	Connecticut	Embossed white numbers on maroon plate; "CONN. 1933" embossed in white characters at bottom.	none	1234; A123; A/B123	unknown	Issued in blocks by branch office.
	Delaware	Two types: (1) Black porcelain-painted enamel on steel with painted white numbers. Renewal tabs for date and year inserted through slots at top right and left. or (2) Embossed orange numbers on blue base.	none	12-345		
	District of Columbia	Embossed yellow lettering and rims on black base. "DIST. OF COLUMBIA" or "DISTRICT OF COLUMBIA" embossed at bottom; "EX 3-31-42" at top.	none	1234; 12-345; 123–456		
	Florida	Embossed orange lettering and border on royaL blue background. "19 FLORIDA 42" embossed at top.	none	12A3456	unknown	County- and weight-class-coded
	Georgia	Embossed white registration and embossed orange lettering and rims on navy blue plate.	none	A12-345		This may be the only 1942 passenger issue with different colors for different embossed lettering.
	Guam					
	Hawai'i	Embossed white lettering on black base. "HAWAII 1942" embossed at bottom.	none	A1234		
	Idaho	Embossed black lettering on white base.				
	Illinois	Embossed golden yellow lettering on black base plate. "ILLINOIS 1942" embossed at bottom.	none	123 456	unknown	
	Indiana	Dark blue lettering embossed on golden yellow base.	none	123–456	unknown	
	Iowa	Embossed white lettering on navy base. "IOWA – 1942" at top.	none	1–2345; 12-3456	County-coded	
	Kansas	Embossed white numbers on green plate with border line; "KANSAS '42" embossed in white block letters centered at bottom; painted sunflower logos at bottom corners.	none	1-12345; 10-12345; 100–123	unknown	County-coded registration
	Kentucky	Black base with white embossed lettering and border. County name at bottom.	none	12345	unknown	
	Louisiana	Embossed white lettering and rims on red base. Pelican logo separator embossed near center.	none	12-345; 123–456		
	Maine	Embossed black numbers on beige plate with border line; "MAINE 1942" embossed in black block letters centered above numbers.	"VACATIONLAND" embossed in black block letters centered below numbers	12-345; 123–456	1 to approximately 177-000	
	Maryland	Embossed black numbers on silver plate with border line; "MARYLAND" embossed in black block letters centered at top; "3–31" embossed in top left corner and "1942" in top right corner.	"DRIVE CAREFULLY" embossed in black block letters centered at bottom.	12-345; 123–456	30-000 to approximately 647-000	
	Massachusetts	Embossed white numbers on red plate or on dark green plate. "MASS – 42" embossed at bottom.	none	12-345; 123–456		
	Michigan	Embossed white lettering on dark green base. "MICHIGAN" embossed at top and "42" at bottom.	none	AB-12-34		County-coded (AB).
	Minnesota	Embossed red lettering and rims on white base. "MINNESOTA 1942" embossed at bottom.	12-345; 123–456	unknown		
	Mississippi	Blue with embossed yellow lettering and rim. The county name was stamped at the top left of the license plate, The letters "MISS" were arranged vertically between the "123" and "456" parts of the registration number.	none	123–456	unknown	Issued in blocks by county.
	Missouri	Embossed black lettering and rims on white base. "MISSOURI 1942" embossed at bottom.	none	12-345; 123–456		
	Montana	Embossed white numbers on black plate with state-shaped border; "MONTANA–42" embossed in white block letters below numbers	none	1-12345; 10-1234		
	Nebraska	Embossed red lettering on white base. "NEBRASKA 42" embossed at bottom.	none	1–2345; 12-3456		County-coded (12 or 1)
	Nevada	Embossed white lettering and rims on blue base. "NEVADA 1942" embossed at bottom.	none	123–456		
	New Hampshire	Embossed green lettering and rims on white base.	Embossed forest green numbers on white plate with border line.			
	New Jersey	Embossed golden yellow numbers on black base. "N.J. 1942" embossed at bottom.	none	AB 123		County-coded (AB)
	New Mexico	Embossed black lettering on white base. "NEW MEXICO" embossed at bottom with Zia sun symbol with two-letter year embossed at left.	"LAND OF ENCHANTMENT" embossed at top.	1–234; 12-345		County-coded (1 or 12)
	New York	Embossed golden yellow lettering on black base. "NY 42" embossed at top center.	none	1A23-45 (and other formats)		County-coded.
	North Carolina	Yellow base with embossed black lettering. "NORTH CAROLINA 42" at bottom.	none	123–456	unknown	
	North Dakota	Embossed yellow lettering and rims on red plate. "ND" embossed vertically to left and "1942" vertically at right.	none	12-345; 123–456		
	Ohio	Embossed forest green lettering on white plate. "OHIO 1942" embossed at bottom.	none	123-AB; 12345; A-123-B; AB-123		County-coded in blocks
	Oklahoma	Embossed black lettering and rims on white plate. "OKLAHOMA 1942" at top.	1–2345; 12-3456			County-coded (1 or 12).
	Oregon	Embossed white numbers on blue plate with border line; "OREGON" embossed in white block letters centered at bottom; "19" embossed in bottom left corner and "42" in bottom right corner	none	123–456	1 to approximately 495-000	
	Pennsylvania	Blue lettering on yellow base with blue state map outline. "1942 PENNA" embossed at top center.	none	A1234; AB123		
	Rhode Island	Embossed white lettering and rims on black base. "R.I. 42" embossed at bottom center.	none	1234; A1234		
	South Carolina	Embossed golden yellow lettering on jet-black base. "SOUTH CAROLINA 42" embossed at top.	none	A-1; A-12; A-123; A-1234		Coded by weight class (A).
	South Dakota	Jet-black lettering embossed on golden yellow base. "SOUTH DAKOTA 1942" embossed at top.	none	1-12345; 12-12345		County-coded (1 or 12)
	Tennessee	Jet-black lettering and rims embossed on state-shaped base.				
	Texas	Black embossed lettering on gold base.	none	123–456; A12-345		
	Utah	Black on white, "UTAH" at left under "42."	"CENTER SCENIC AMERICA" embossed at bottom.	A1234	unknown	
	Vermont	Navy lettering embossed on white base. "19 VERMONT 42" embossed at bottom.	none	1–234; 12-345		
	Virginia	Embossed black lettering on white base. "VIRGINIA 1942" embossed at top.	none	123–456		
	Washington	Embossed green lettering on white base. "WASHINGTON 1942" embossed at bottom.	none	A-12345		
	West Virginia	Embossed yellow numbers on black plate with border line; "W. VA. EXP.-6-30-42" embossed in yellow block letters at bottom	none	123–456	1 to approximately 349-000	
	Wisconsin	Embossed golden yellow numbers on black plate; "19 WISCONSIN 42" at bottom	"AMERICA'S DAIRYLAND" at top	123 456	1 to approximately 775 000	Corners were rounded and plates were revalidated for 1943 with white tabs, for 1944 with green tabs, and for 1945 with white tabs, due to metal conservation for World War II.
	Wisconsin	Embossed golden yellow serial on black plate with border line; "WIS" embossed at bottom left, embossed yellow oval with debossed black "1942" at bottom right	none	A12, A1B, AB1, ABC, 12A, 1A2, 1AB	A00 to 9ZZ	Issued from late 1942 to late 1943 for World War II metal conservation; revalidated to 1945. Every possible combination of 3 characters was exhausted.
	Wyoming	Embossed black numbers and Bucking Horse and Rider on white plate with border line; "1942 WYOMING" embossed in black block letters at top	none	1–1234; 2-A123; 10-1234		County coded (1 or 10)

== Non-passenger plates ==
Non-passenger plates
Image (standard)	Region	Type	Design and slogan	Serial format	Serials issued	Notes
	Wisconsin	Bus	Embossed yellow serial on black plate; "WIS" over "BUS" at top left, "41" over "42" at top right; quarterly tab at top between caption and year	A 12	Coded by weight class	Weight classes are same as truck/heavy truck
	Wisconsin	Cabin	Embossed black serial on gray plate with border line; "41 CABIN 42" at top, "WISCONSIN" at bottom	1234	1 to approximately 1900	
	Wisconsin	Dealer	Embossed golden yellow serial on black plate with border line; "19 WIS DEALER 42" at top, "AMERICA'S DAIRYLAND" at bottom	1234 A	Dealer number and plate number	Number is the dealer number, letter is the plate number for that dealer
	Wisconsin	Farm	Embossed white serial on green plate with border line; "41 FARM TR'K 42" at top, vertical "WIS" at left	12345	1 to approximately 65000	Some later plates had a "TR'K FARM" caption
	Wisconsin	Motorcycle	Embossed yellow serial on black plate with border line; "WIS 1942" at bottom	1234	1 to approximately 3000	
	Wisconsin	Municipal	Embossed black serial on golden yellow plate; unknown format	1234	Unknown to approximately 8900	Identifiable by a hollow diamond
	Wisconsin	Official	Unknown format or colors	123	1 to unknown	Identifiable by a hollow star.
	Wisconsin	Light Private Trailer	Embossed black serial on gray plate; "41 WIS TRAILER 42" at bottom, "NOT FOR HIRE" at top	A1234	Coded by weight class	Weight classes same as truck.
	Wisconsin	Heavy Trailer	Embossed yellow serial on black plate; "WIS" over "T-L" at top left, "41" over "42" at top right; quarterly tab at top between caption and year	A 12	Coded by weight class	Weight classes same as heavy truck. Issued to all commercial trailers, and issued to private trailers above the D weight class.
	Wisconsin	Truck	Embossed black serial on gray plate; "41 WIS TRUCK 42" at bottom, "NOT FOR HIRE" at top	12-345A	Coded by weight class	Serials start at 25-001A. Weight classes are A, B, C, and D.
	Wisconsin	Heavy Truck	Embossed yellow serial on black plate; "WIS" over "TRK" at top left, "41" over "42" at top right; quarterly tab at top between caption and year	A 1234	Coded by weight class	Weight classes are E, F, G, H, J, K, L, M, and N. Light commercial trucks received identical plates in the A, B, C, and D weight classes.

== See also ==
- Antique vehicle registration
- Electronic license plate
- Motor vehicle registration
- Vehicle license
