= Vehicle registration plates of the United States for 1943 =

1943 license plates in the United States

Vehicle registration plates of the United States by year
Vehicle registration plates of the United States for 1942	Events of 1943	Vehicle registration plates of the United States for 1944

Each of the 48 states of the United States of America plus several of its territories and the District of Columbia issued windshield stickers and renewed individual passenger license plates for 1943, while only a few issued license plates for 1943.

== Passenger baseplates ==
Passenger Car Plates
Image	Region	Design	Slogan	Serial format	Serials issued	Notes
	Alabama					
	Alaska					
	American Samoa					
	Arizona					
	Arkansas					
	California	Same as the 1941 and 1942 base plates, but has a white tab with a painted red "V" and debossed serial on it.				It's placed on your 1941 California plate if you're a new registrant in 1942 and didn't get the 1942 revalidation tab.
	Canal Zone					
	Colorado					
	Connecticut					
	Delaware					
	District of Columbia					
	Florida					
	Georgia					
	Guam					
	Hawai'i					
	Idaho					
	Illinois	White serial on green fiberboard plate, "ILLINOIS 43" on top				Illinois used fiberboard plates from 1943 to 1948.
	Indiana					
	Iowa	Embossed white lettering on black base, "IOWA – 1942" at top	none	1–2345; 12-3456	County-coded	1942 base reused for 1943 with a windshield sticker due to World War II metal rationing.
	Kansas					
	Kentucky					
	Louisiana					
	Maine					
	Maryland					
	Massachusetts					
	Michigan					
	Minnesota					
	Mississippi					
	Missouri					
	Montana					
	Nebraska					
	Nevada					
	New Hampshire					
	New Jersey					
	New Mexico					
	New York					
	North Carolina					
	North Dakota					
	Northern Mariana; Islands					
	Ohio					
	Oklahoma					
	Oregon					The 1942 plates continued in use and were validated by a windshield sticker for 1943.
	Pennsylvania					
	Puerto Rico					
	Rhode Island					
	South Carolina					
	South Dakota					
	Tennessee					
	Texas					
	Utah					
	Vermont					
	Virginia					
	Washington					
	West Virginia					
	Wisconsin	Embossed golden yellow serial on black plate; "19 WISCONSIN 42" at bottom, slogan at top	AMERICA'S DAIRYLAND	123 456	1 to approximately 775 000	Revalidated to 1945. 1943 tabs are black on white
	Wisconsin	Embossed golden yellow serial on black plate; "WIS" at bottom left, yellow oval with debossed "1942" at bottom right	none	A12, A1B, AB1, ABC, 12A, 1A2, 1AB	A00 to 9ZZ	Revalidated to 1945. 1943 tabs are black on white
	Wisconsin	Embossed golden yellow serial on black plate; "WIS" at bottom left, white oval with debossed "43" at bottom right	none	A123, 1A23	A000 to Z999, 0A00 to 9K99	Revalidated to 1945.
	Wyoming					

== Non-passenger plates ==
Non-passenger Plates
Image (standard)	Region	Type	Design & Slogan	Serial format	Serials issued	Notes
	Wisconsin	Bus	Embossed black serial on yellow plate with border line; "WIS. BUS." embossed bottom right, black oval with debossed "42-43" at bottom left	A 12	Coded by weight class	
	Wisconsin	Cabin	Embossed black serial on orange plate with border line; "CABIN" at bottom, vertical "WIS" at left, black oval with debossed "42-43" at bottom left	123	1 to approximately 950	
	Wisconsin	Dealer	Embossed yellow serial on black plate with border line; "19 WIS DEALER 42" at top, "AMERICA'S DAIRYLAND" at bottom	1234 A	Dealer number and plate number	Number is the dealer number, letter is the plate number for that dealer. Revalidated for 1943 with yellow tabs.
	Wisconsin	Farm	Embossed black serial on white plate with border line; "FARM" at top, "WIS" at left, black oval with debossed "42-43" at top right	12345	1 to approximately 65000	
	Wisconsin	Motorcycle	Embossed black serial on yellow plate with border line; "WIS" at top right, black oval with debossed "1943" at top left	1234	1 to approximately 5200	
	Wisconsin	Municipal	Embossed black serial on orange plate with border line; "WIS" at bottom right, black oval with debossed "43" at bottom right; embossed diamond at right	12345	? to approximately 11200	Motorcycle version also available
	Wisconsin	Official	Embossed white serial on black plate with border line; "WIS" at bottom left, white oval with debossed "43" at bottom right; embossed hollow star at left	123	001? to unknown (007 high)	Motorcycle version also available
	Wisconsin	Light private trailer	Embossed black serial on orange plate with border line; "WIS. TLR." at top, black oval with debossed "42-43" at top left	1234A	Coded by weight class	Weight classes are A, B, C, and D. Issued to private trailers 8,000lbs and under.
	Wisconsin	Limited trailer	Embossed orange serial on black plate with border line; "WIS. TLR." at top, black oval with debossed "42-43" at top left	1234	0001 to unknown (0100 listed in 1943 plate guide)	Used on private trailers hauled 2 miles or less from "loading platform or freight station"
	Wisconsin	Heavy trailer	Embossed black serial on yellow plate with border line; "WIS" over "T-L" at top left, "42" over "43" at top right, quarterly tab at top between caption and year	12 A	Coded by weight class	Used on all commercial trailers and private trailers in excess of 8,000lbs. Weight classes are A, B, C, D, E, F, G, H, J, K, L, M, and N for commercial trailers, private trailers use the E weight class and above. These are the only plates that would use quarterly tabs in 1943, as heavy truck and bus plates used quarterly windshield stickers.
	Wisconsin	Truck	Embossed black serial on orange plate with border line; "WIS. TRK." at top left, black oval with debossed "42-43" at top left	12345A	Coded by weight class	Used on light private trucks 8,000lbs or below. Weight classes are A, B, C, and D.
	Wisconsin	Heavy truck	Embossed black serial on yellow plate with border line; "WIS. TRK." at bottom right, black oval with debossed "42-43" at bottom left	A12345	Coded by weight class	Used on commercial trucks and private trucks in excess of 8,000lbs. Weight classes are A, B, C, D, E, F, G, H, J, K, L, M, and N for commercial trucks, private trucks used the E weight class and above.

== See also ==
- Antique vehicle registration
- Electronic license plate
- Motor vehicle registration
- Vehicle license
