= Vehicle registration plates of the United States for 1919 =

1919 license plates in the United States

Vehicle registration plates of the United States by year
Vehicle registration plates of the United States for 1918	Events of 1919	Vehicle registration plates of the United States for 1920

Each of the 48 states of the United States of America plus several of its territories and the District of Columbia issued individual passenger license plates for 1919.

== Passenger baseplates ==
Legend:	Regular state issue plate(s)	No plates issued by state or territory

Passenger Car Plates
Image	Region	Design	Slogan	Serial format	Serials issued	Notes
	Alabama					
	Alaska					No prestate plates. State issued plates begin in 1921.
	American Samoa					No prestate plates. Territory issued plates begin in 1924.
	Arizona					
	Arkansas					
	California					
	Canal Zone					
	Colorado					
	Connecticut					
	Delaware					
	District of Columbia					
	Florida					
	Georgia					
	Guam					
	Hawai'i					No prestate plates. Territory issued plates begin in 1922.
	Idaho					
	Illinois					
	Indiana					
	Iowa					
	Kansas					
	Kentucky					
	Louisiana					
	Maine					
	Maryland					
	Massachusetts					
	Michigan					
	Minnesota					
	Mississippi	Embossed light green on black; vertical "1919" and "MISS" at left and right respectively	none	12345	1 to approximately 60000	
	Missouri					
	Montana					
	Nebraska					
	Nevada					
	New Hampshire					
	New Jersey					
	New Mexico					
	New York					
	North Carolina	Embossed white serial on black plate; "NC" monogram and "6-30 1919" at right	none	12-345	1 to approximately 80-000	
	North Dakota					
	Northern Mariana; Islands					No prestate plates. Territory issued plates begin in 1944.
	Ohio					
	Oklahoma					
	Oregon					
	Pennsylvania					
	Puerto Rico					
	Rhode Island					
	South Carolina					
	South Dakota					
	Tennessee					
	Texas					
	Utah					
	Vermont					
	Virgin Islands					
	Virginia					
	Washington					
	West Virginia					
	Wisconsin	Embossed deep yellow serial on dark green plate with border; "W" over 19 at right.	none	123456	1 to approximately 225000	
	Wyoming					

== See also ==
- Antique vehicle registration
- Electronic license plate
- Motor vehicle registration
- Vehicle license
