= Vehicle registration plates of the United States for 1933 =

1933 license plates in the United States

Vehicle registration plates of the United States by year
Vehicle registration plates of the United States for 1932	Events of 1933	Vehicle registration plates of the United States for 1934

Each of the 48 states of the United States plus several of its territories and the District of Columbia issued individual passenger license plates for 1933.

== Passenger baseplates ==
Passenger car plates
Image	Region	Design	Slogan	Serial format	Serials issued	Notes
	Alabama	Embossed white lettering and rims on blue base.	none	123-456A		
	Alaska		none	12345		
	American Samoa					
	Arizona	Debossed oblique lettering in copper base; black raised field.	none	1AB2	unknown	County-coded registration.
	Arkansas			123–456		
	California	Embossed yellow lettering on black base; "19 CALIFORNIA 33" embossed at bottom.	none	1A 23 45	unknown	
	Canal Zone	Embossed red lettering on white background	none	1234		
	Colorado	Embossed black lettering on golden yellow base;	none	1-12345; 10-1234	County-coded	
	Connecticut	Embossed white numbers on maroon plate; "CONN. 1933" embossed in white characters at bottom.	none	1234; A123; A/B123		Issued in blocks by branch office.
	Delaware		none	123456		
	District of Columbia				unknown	
	Florida				unknown	
	Georgia					
	Guam					
	Hawai'i	Embossed red lettering on orange plate. "HAWAII 1933" at top.	none			
	Idaho	Embossed golden yellow lettering on black base. "19 – IDAHO – 33" at bottom.	none	1A-23-45	unknown	County coded (1A)
	Illinois	White lettering embossed on blue base; "ILL 33" at bottom.	"LAND OF LINCOLN" embossed at top	123 456; 1 234 567	1 to approximately 1-277-000	
	Indiana	White lettering embossed on maroon base; "INDIANA 33" embossed at top.	none	123–456		
	Iowa	White embossed lettering and border on navy background.	none	12-3456		County-coded.
	Kansas	Embossed white numbers on black plate with border line; "KAN 33" embossed in white block letters at right.	none	1–2345; 12-3456		County-coded
	Kentucky	Green base with white embossed lettering and border. County name at bottom between "KY" and "33.".	none	123–456		
	Louisiana	Orange base with embossed black block lettering and border and pelican at center.	none	123 456		
	Maine	Embossed white block lettering and rims on black base; "MAINE 1933" embossed at bottom.	none	1–234; 12-345	unknown	
	Maryland	Embossed white numbers and rims on blue plate with border line.	none			
	Massachusetts	Embossed white lettering on green base.				
	Michigan	Black on white, "MICHIGAN 1933" on bottom.	none	1-234-567		Issued in front and rear pairs.
	Minnesota	Embossed black lettering and rims on unpainted metal base. "MINN" embossed vertically at left and "33" in bottom left corner	none	A123-456	unknown	Coded by class (A)
	Mississippi	Green base with embossed white lettering and rim. "MISS." located above registration number. Locking tab at top incused with white vehicle class letter and "33" for date..	none	12-345	unknown	
	Missouri	Embossed pale yellow lettering and rims on brown base. "1933 MISSOURI" embossed at bottom center.	none	123–456	unknown	
	Montana					
	Nebraska	Embossed blue lettering and rims on golden yellow base. "NEB 33" embossed at right.	none	12-3456		County-coded
	Nevada	Embossed orange letters and border on teal base; "NEVADA 1933" embossed at bottom.	none	A/ 1–234; A/B1-234		County-coded
	New Hampshire	White base with embossed green lettering and border.	none	1–234		County-coded
	New Jersey	Orange lettering embossed on black base.	none	A12345		County-coded.
	New Mexico	Red embossed lettering and sunburst design on yellow background. "NEW MEXICO" embossed at bottom and sunburst with "33" inside embossed at left.	none	12-3456		County-coded
	New York	Embossed black lettering on gold base; "NY 33" embossed at bottom center.	none	A-12-34; 1A23-45		County-coded.
	North Carolina	Blue base with embossed white lettering "NORTH CAROLINA – 33" at bottom.	none	123–456		
	North Dakota	White lettering and border embossed on green base. "ND" embossed at left and "33" embossed at right.	none	123–456	1 to approximately 149-000	
	Northern Mariana Islands					
	Ohio	Embossed black numbers on orange plate; "OHIO 1933" embossed in at top.	none	A·12345; AB·1234; 12345·A; 1234·AB; A·1234·B		Issued in blocks by county
	Oklahoma	Embossed yellow numbers on black plate; "OKLAHOMA 1933" embossed at bottom.	none	1-123456; 10-12345		County-coded
	Oregon		none	123–456		
	Pennsylvania	Embossed yellow lettering and state-shaped border on blue base. "1954 PENNA" embossed at top below 3-31-55 expiration date..	none	123AB		
	Puerto Rico					
	Rhode Island	Embossed black lettering on white base. "RHODE 53 ISLAND" embossed at bottom.	none	A1234		Black "54" renewal tabs inserted over 53 at bottom center.
	South Carolina	Embossed white numbers on black plate; "SOUTH CAROLINA 54" embossed in white block letters at bottom.	none	A-123-456		Coded by weight class (A)
	South Dakota	Embossed black lettering on white base with Mount Rushmore decal at top.	none	1–1234; 1-A123; 12-1234; 12-A123		Coded by county (1 or 10 prefix)
	Tennessee	Embossed yellow numbers on black state-shaped plate with border line; "TENN. 54" embossed in yellow block letters centered at bottom.	none	1-12345; 10-1234; 1D-12345; 10D-1234		(D) in registration indicates vehicles weighing over 3,500 lbs.
	Texas					
	Utah					
	Vermont	Embossed dark green numbers on white plate; "54 VERMONT" embossed in dark green block letters centered at bottom.	none	12345; A1234		
	Virginia	Embossed white numbers on black plate; "VIRGINIA 1954" embossed in white block letters at top.	none	123–456	1 to approximately 999-999	
	Washington	Embossed white numbers on green plate; "54 WASHINGTON" embossed in white block letters at bottom.	none	123–456 A 12-345 AB		County-coded (A or AB)
	West Virginia	Embossed yellow numbers on black plate with border line; "W. VA. EXP.-6-30-54" embossed in yellow block letters at bottom.	none	123–456		
	Wisconsin	Embossed white numbers on black plate; "WISCONSIN 33" embossed at top;	none	123-456	1 to approximately 570-000	Numbers under 1000 use small plates.
	Wyoming	Embossed black numbers on white plate with border line; "WYOMING" embossed in black block letters at bottom.	none	1-12345; 10-1234		County-coded

== Non-passenger plates ==
Non-passenger plates
Image	Region	Type	Design/Slogan	Serial Format	Serials Issued	Notes
	Wisconsin	City bus	Embossed white serial on black plate with border line; unknown format		Coded by weight class	
	Wisconsin	Dealer	Embossed white serial on black plate with border line; "DEALER WIS 33" at top	1234A	Dealer number and plate number	The number is the dealer number, the letter is the plate number for that dealer
	Wisconsin	Duplicate	Embossed white serial on black plate with border line; "WISCONSIN 33" at top, diagonal "DUPL" at left	1234	1 to approximately 2700	
	Wisconsin	Interurban bus	Embossed white serial on black plate with border line; unknown format		Coded by weight class	
	Wisconsin	Motorcycle	Embossed white serial on black plate with border line; "WIS - 33" at top	1234	1 to approximately 1600	
	Wisconsin	Municipal	Embossed purple serial on white plate with border line; "WISCONSIN 33" at top, hollow star at right	1234	1 to approximately 5600	Identifiable by a hollow star; motorcycle version also available
	Wisconsin	Trailer	Embossed white serial on green plate; unknown format		Coded by weight class	Weight classes same as truck
	Wisconsin	Truck	Embossed white serial on green plate; "32 TRUCK WIS 33" at bottom	12-345 A	Coded by weight class	Weight classes are A, B, C, D, E, F, G, H, J, K, L, M, and N

== See also ==
- Antique vehicle registration
- Electronic license plate
- Motor vehicle registration
- Vehicle license
