= Vehicle registration plates of the United States for 1941 =

1941 license plates in the United States

Vehicle registration plates of the United States by year
Vehicle registration plates of the United States for 1940	Events of 1941	Vehicle registration plates of the United States for 1942

Each of the 48 states of the United States of America plus several of its territories and the District of Columbia issued individual passenger license plates for 1941.

== Passenger baseplates ==
Passenger Car Plates
Image	Region	Design	Slogan	Serial format	Serials issued	Notes
	Alabama					
	Alaska					
	American Samoa					
	Arizona					
	Arkansas					
	California	embossed golden yellow serial on black plate, and "19 California 41" on top				
	Canal Zone					
	Colorado					
	Connecticut					
	Delaware					
	District of Columbia					
	Florida					
	Georgia					
	Guam					
	Hawai'i					
	Idaho					
	Illinois					
	Indiana					
	Iowa					
	Kansas					
	Kentucky					
	Louisiana					
	Maine					
	Maryland					
	Massachusetts					
	Michigan					
	Minnesota					
	Mississippi					
	Missouri					
	Montana					
	Nebraska					
	Nevada					
	New Hampshire					
	New Jersey					
	New Mexico					
	New York					
	North Carolina					
	North Dakota					
	Northern Mariana; Islands					
	Ohio					
	Oklahoma					
	Oregon					
	Pennsylvania					
	Puerto Rico					
	Rhode Island					
	South Carolina					
	South Dakota					
	Tennessee					
	Texas					
	Utah					
	Vermont					
	Virginia					
	Washington					
	West Virginia					
	Wisconsin	Embossed black serial on golden yellow plate; "19 WISCONSIN 41" at bottom, slogan at top	AMERICA'S DAIRYLAND	123-456	1 to approximately 795-000	
	Wyoming					Sample plate shown.

== Non-passenger plates ==
Non-passenger plates
Image (standard)	Region	Type	Design and slogan	Serial format	Serials issued	Notes
	Wisconsin	Cabin	Embossed white serial on blue plate with border line; "40 CABIN 41" at bottom, vertical "WIS" at right	123	1 to approximately 700	
	Wisconsin	Dealer	Embossed black serial on golden yellow plate with border line; "19 WIS DEALER 41" at bottom, "AMERICA'S DAIRYLAND" at top	1234A	Dealer number and plate number	Number is the dealer number, letter is the plate number for that dealer
	Wisconsin	Duplicate	Embossed black serial on golden yellow plate with border line; "19 WISCONSIN 41" at bottom, "AMERICA'S DAIRYLAND" at top; vertical "DUP" at left	1234	1 to approximately 2000	
	Wisconsin	Farm	Embossed white serial on brown plate with border line; "40 FARM TR'K 41" at bottom, vertical "WIS" at right	12-345	1 to approximately 64-000	
	Wisconsin	Motorcycle	Embossed black serial on golden yellow plate with border line; "WIS 1941" at top	1234	1 to approximately 3400	
	Wisconsin	Municipal	Embossed yellow serial on black plate with border line; "19 WISCONSIN 41" at bottom, "AMERICA'S DAIRYLAND" at top; embossed hollow diamond at left	1234	1 to approximately 6800	Identifiable with a hollow diamond
	Wisconsin	Official	Embossed yellow serial on black plate with border line; "19 WISCONSIN 41" at bottom, "AMERICA'S DAIRYLAND" at top; embossed hollow star at left	123	1 to unknown	Identifiable by a hollow star. The high is 14, though the expected high number is higher.
	Wisconsin	Light Private Trailer	Embossed white serial on blue plate with border line; "40 WIS TRAILER 41" at bottom, vertical "WIS" at right	A 1234	Coded by weight class	Weight classes are same as truck
	Wisconsin	Heavy Trailer	Embossed black serial on yellow plate with border line; "WIS" over "T-L" at top left, "40" over "41" at top right; quarterly tab at top between stacked caption and year	A 1234	Coded by weight class	Weight classes are same as heavy truck
	Wisconsin	Truck	Embossed white serial on blue plate with border line; "40 WIS TRUCK 41" at bottom	A 12-345	Coded by weight class	Serials start at A 25-001. Weight classes are A, B, C, and D.
	Wisconsin	Heavy Truck	Embossed black serial on yellow plate with border line; "WIS" over "TRK" at top left, "40" over "41" at top right; quarterly tab at top between stacked caption and year	A 1234	Coded by weight class	Weight classes are E, F, G, H, J, K, L, M, and N. Commercial light trucks received identical plates in the A, B, C, and D weight classes.

== See also ==
- Antique vehicle registration
- Electronic license plate
- Motor vehicle registration
- Vehicle license
