= Vehicle registration plates of the United States for 1937 =

1937 license plates in the United States

Vehicle registration plates of the United States by year
Vehicle registration plates of the United States for 1936	Events of 1937	Vehicle registration plates of the United States for 1938

Each of the 48 states of the United States of America plus several of its territories and the District of Columbia issued individual passenger license plates for 1937.

== Passenger baseplates ==
Passenger Car Plates
Image	Region	Design	Slogan	Serial format	Serials issued	Notes
	Alabama					
	Alaska					
	American Samoa					
	Arizona					
	Arkansas					
	California					
	Canal Zone					
	Colorado					
	Connecticut					
	Delaware					
	District of Columbia					
	Florida					
	Georgia					
	Guam					
	Hawai'i					
	Idaho					
	Illinois					
	Indiana					
	Iowa					
	Kansas					
	Kentucky					
	Louisiana	Embossed golden yellow serial with pelican separator on maroon plate with border line; "LOUISIANA–1937" centered at bottom	none	123-456	Issued in blocks by horsepower class and branch office	
	Maine					
	Maryland					
	Massachusetts					
	Michigan					
	Minnesota					
	Mississippi					
	Missouri					
	Montana					
	Nebraska	Black on gray; "37 – NEBRASKA" at bottom	none	1-12345; 10-1234	Coded by county of issuance (1 or 10)	
	Nevada					
	New Hampshire					
	New Jersey					
	New Mexico					
	New York					
	North Carolina					
	North Dakota					
	Northern Mariana; Islands					
	Ohio					
	Oklahoma					
	Oregon					
	Pennsylvania					
	Puerto Rico					
	Rhode Island					
	South Carolina					
	South Dakota					
	Tennessee					
	Texas					
	Utah					
	Vermont					
	Virginia					
	Washington					
	West Virginia					
	Wisconsin					
	Wyoming					

== Non-passenger plates ==
Non-passenger Plates
Image (standard)	Region	Type	Design & Slogan	Serial format	Serials issued	Notes
	Wisconsin	City bus	Embossed white serial on dark blue plate with border line; unknown format		Coded by weight class	
	Wisconsin	Dealer	Embossed white serial on dark blue plate with border line; "37 DEALER WIS" at top	1234A	Dealer number and plate number	Number is the dealer number, letter is the plate number for that dealer
	Wisconsin	Duplicate	Embossed white serial on dark blue plate with border line; unknown format	1234	1 to unknown	
	Wisconsin	Farm	Embossed white serial on red plate with border line; "36 FARM TRUCK 37" at bottom, vertical "WIS" at left	12-345	1 to approximately 49-000	
	Wisconsin	Interurban bus	Embossed white serial on dark blue plate with border line; unknown format		Coded by weight class	
	Wisconsin	Motorcycle	Embossed white serial on dark blue plate with border line; "37 - WIS" at top	1234	1 to approximately 1200	
	Wisconsin	Motorcycle dealer	Embossed white serial on dark blue plate with border line; unknown format			
	Wisconsin	Municipal	Embossed blue serial on white plate with border line; "37 WISCONSIN" at top, hollow star at right	1234	1 to approximately 7300	Identifiable by a hollow star
	Wisconsin	Municipal motorcycle	Embossed blue serial on white plate with border line; "37 - WIS" at top, hollow star at right	12	1 to approximately 99	
	Wisconsin	Trailer	Embossed white serial on red plate with border line; unknown format	1234 A	Coded by weight class	Weight classes same as truck
	Wisconsin	Truck	Embossed white serial on red plate with border line; "36 TRUCK WIS 37" at bottom	12-345 A	Coded by weight class	Weight classes are A, B, C, D, E, F, G, H, J, K, L, M, and N

== See also ==
- Antique vehicle registration
- Electronic license plate
- Motor vehicle registration
- Vehicle license
