= The Soul of a Horse =

Photograph by Peter Thomann

The Soul of a Horse (1963) by Peter Thomann

The Soul of a Horse (Mare With Foal) was an award-winning 1963 photo taken by the German photojournalist and Stern magazine staffer Peter Thomann.

In the mid-1970s the Kentucky Horse Park near Lexington opened to the public, using a logo based on the photograph. The icon of the dark colored mare and a light colored foal in mid-run was used on the Kentucky 1988 base license plate. Thomann sued the state for use of the image. Kentucky could not continue producing the plate while in litigation, so a plain blue on white design was used until resolution of the lawsuit.

== See also ==
- Vehicle registration plates of Kentucky
