= Peter Thomann =

German photographer

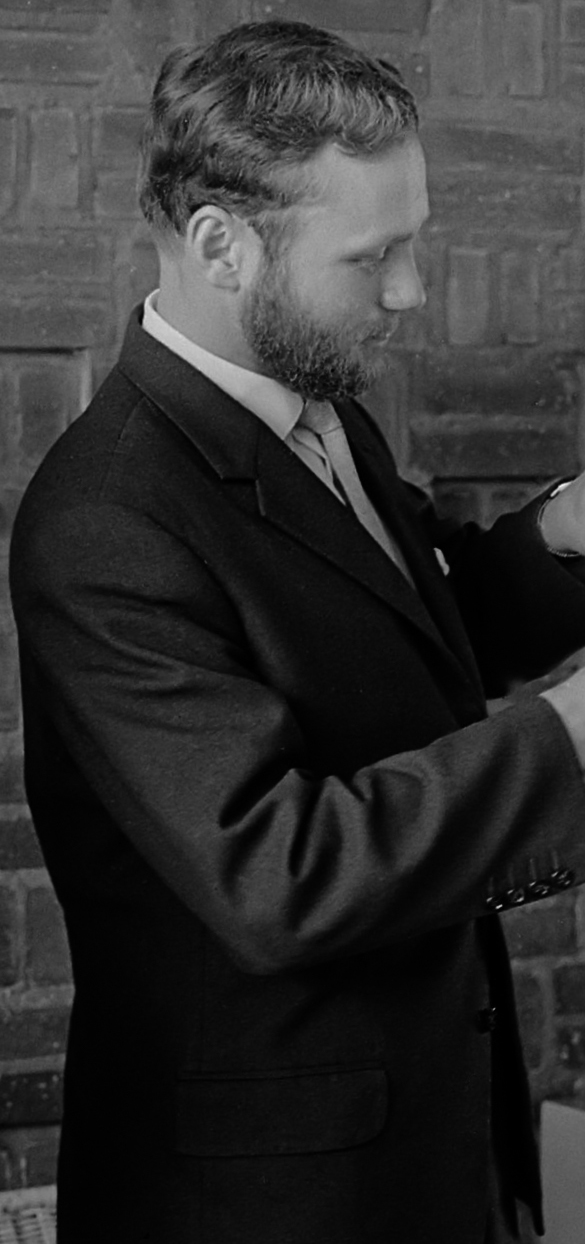
Peter Thomann (left) receiving the World Press Photo (1964)

Peter Thomann (born 1940) is a German photographer who worked as a staff photographer for Stern magazine.

== Photography ==
His photograph "The Soul of a Horse" won the 1st prize WORLD PRESS PHOTO AWARD 1963 and in 1996 entered the Guinness Book of Records as the most frequently copied photograph. Because it was used as the logo for the Kentucky Horse Park and appeared on Kentucky's license plates he threatened to sue in the late 1990s.

== Exhibitions ==
International Museum of the Horse in Lexington, Kentucky, Museum Men and Nature, Munich, Germany, Museum of Natural History, Berlin, Germany, Westfalian Horse Museum, Muenster, Germany.

== Awards and nominations ==
Among other awards he won two other World Press Photo Awards in 1964 and 1982.
