= Vermont Department of Motor Vehicles =

Government agency in Vermont, USA

Agency overview
- Formed: 1894
- Jurisdiction: Vermont
- Headquarters: Montpelier, Vermont
- Employees: 500+
- Agency executive: Andrew Collier, Commissioner
- Parent agency: Vermont Agency of Transportation
- Website: http://dmv.vermont.gov/

The Vermont Department of Motor Vehicles (DMV) is the governmental agency responsible for registering and inspecting automobiles and other motor vehicles as well as licensing drivers in the U.S. state of Vermont.

== History ==
In 1894 the first law governing motor vehicles was passed. This was a preventive measure only as there were no automobiles yet in the state. The first automobile appeared in the state in 1898. It was a one-seat Stanley Steamer purchased for $900 by Dr. J.H. Linsley of Burlington. In 1900 the legislature repealed the original 1894 law governing motor vehicles.

The state established speed limits in 1902: 15 miles per hour (24 km/h) on the open road and 6 miles per hour (9.7 km/h) in town.

In 1904, the state required licenses for driving. It required that all motor vehicles be registered with the Secretary of State by May 1905. 373 vehicles were registered. Charles Warren was issued the first "#1" plate.

In 1905 the first known motor vehicle fatality in the state was reported at Pike's Crossing in North Bennington. In 1906 the state enacted a statute providing for the issuance of uniform license plates made of enamel. The registration fee varied by horsepower.

In 1908 the Legislature required annual registration. Plates were dated. By 1913, the number of vehicles registered rose to 4,538. There was a concentration of one vehicle for every 78.4 people in the state.

By 1916 the number of vehicle registered had grown to 16,000. There were 19,000 licensed drivers.

In 1918, it was determined that trained personnel to enforce the motor vehicle laws were needed. Ara A. Griggs was assigned as a one-man patrol to cover the entire state.

The Acts of 1921 gave the Secretary of State the authority to suspend or revoke the driving license of a Vermont resident and to deny the right of a non-resident operator in Vermont if s/he failed to comply with Vermont laws. The 1921 Act also provided for the testing of all new drivers.

In 1923, gasoline was taxed at the rate of one cent per gallon. Also, the number of vehicle registrations was 61,000. There were 67,000 licensed drivers.

In 1925, the legislature re-wrote all motor vehicle laws, forming the basis of present-day motor vehicle statutes. They created a Motor Vehicle Bureau within the Secretary of State's office. The department's enforcement personnel formed the “Vermont Highway Patrol”. The first patrol officers used motorcycles that were purchased by the officers themselves. The plate numbers 1-100 were assigned to various state officials.

In 1927, the DMV was established as a separate department. Charles Pierce became the first Commissioner of Motor Vehicles. The first Financial Responsibility Insurance Act was passed (possibly the first Act of its kind in the United States).

In 1928 after the Secretary of State suggested denying driving privileges to all of those who are under 18 years of age, a compromise was reached whereby those age 16 and 17 may apply for "Junior Operator" licenses, the first of which were issued in January.

In 1935 the legislature passed the first motor vehicle inspection law. It also passed an act authorizing prison inmates to manufacture license plates, a practice that continues today.

By 1936 the number of licensed operators in the state exceeded 100,000.

== General license information ==
A person who lives and drives in Vermont must obtain a Vermont driver's license. A person who has moved into the state from another jurisdiction with a valid license from that state must obtain a Vermont license within 60 days of moving into the state.

In accordance with state and federal law, any person holding a commercial driver license from another state must transfer their commercial driver license within 30 days of establishing residency in Vermont.

Holding a license requires the holder to drive within the limits of the law and to treat all users of the highway, including bicyclists, motorcyclists, and pedestrians with courtesy and consideration.

A license examination tests the knowledge and skills of the test taker.

The following are types of licenses issued:

- Learner’s Permit for 15- to 17-year-olds
- Driver’s License, for most adult drivers
- Junior Driver’s License, for 16- to 17-year-olds who have successfully held a learner's permit for one year
- Commercial Driver License (CDL), to drive large vehicles
- CDL Instructional Permit, to teach driving
- Enhanced Drivers License (EDL) -acts as a universal citizen identification in lieu of a passport in Canada and the United States.

To apply for a Vermont Permit an applicant will need to prove that they are a Vermont resident or are a Visiting Citizen of a Foreign Country with an authorized duration of stay with at least 30 days remaining.

Each applicant for an original Learner's Permit is required to show documented proof of identity, date of birth, lawful status in the US, Social Security Number, Vermont residency, and current residential address. Additionally, resident aliens are required to show lawful status in the United States, but need not produce a Social Security Number.

There are various restrictions on underage drivers with learners' permits.

== Motor vehicle registration ==
A registration certificate must always be in the vehicle when it is being used. A police officer has the right to see it. The registration plates must be properly affixed. The rear plate must be lit so it can be read from at least 50 feet (15 m) away. The number plates must only be used for that vehicle. They may be transferred to a new vehicle purchased by the same owner.

When a purchaser buys a new or used vehicle, they must pay a Purchase and Use Tax, which is 6% of the price or the current fair market value, whichever is greater.

New residents of Vermont applying for registration for the first time on a motor vehicle acquired outside the State of Vermont on which a sales or use tax has been paid by the person applying for registration in Vermont, or their spouse, will be exempt from the Vermont Purchase and Use Tax upon providing proof that the tax paid in another jurisdiction is equal to or greater than the Vermont tax or if the vehicle has been registered in a jurisdiction that collects Purchase or Use tax for at least 3 years. If the tax paid in another jurisdiction is less than the Vermont tax, the tax due shall be the difference.

All vehicles 15 years old and newer must have a Vermont Motor Vehicle title. Some exceptions are: a motorcycle with less than 300 ccs of engine displacement and a trailer with empty weight of 1,500 pounds or less. Starting with the model year 2004 and later ATVs and Snowmobiles need to be titled as well.

There are provisions for non-resident persons in the US military who do not have to register in person.

A driver is responsible for ensuring that the vehicle they drive is covered by insurance against personal liability. The amount of coverage MUST be at least $25,000 for death or injury of one person; $50,000 for death or injury of 2 or more persons; $10,000 for property damage.

If an operator is driving without insurance and any of the following happens, the operator's license will be revoked by the Commissioner of Motor Vehicles until the vehicle is insured.

- The operator is involved in an accident, even if the driver is not at fault
- Driving while under the influence of alcohol or drugs,
- Driving or taking another person's vehicle without the owner's consent,
- Driving when the operator's license is suspended, revoked, or refused,
- Driving a vehicle in such a way as to cause the death of another person,
- Leaving the scene of an accident

The last five instances are considered felonies under state law.

Each vehicle must be inspected annually.

== See also ==
- Vehicle registration plates of Vermont
- BeSeatSmart Child Passenger Safety Program
