= Vehicle registration plates of Delaware =

Delaware vehicle license plates

Delaware
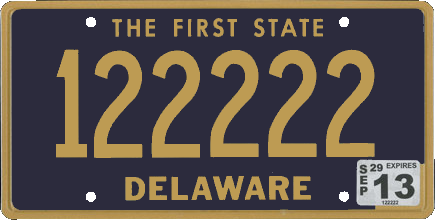

Current series
- Size: 12 in × 6 in 30 cm × 15 cm
- Material: Aluminum
- Serial format: 123456
- Introduced: 2008

Availability
- Issued by: Delaware Department of Transportation, Division of Motor Vehicles
- Manufactured by: Waldale Manufacturing Limited, Amherst, Nova Scotia

History
- First issued: May 1, 1909 (pre-state plates from 1905 through April 30, 1909)

The U.S. state of Delaware first required its residents to register their motor vehicles in 1905. Registrants provided their own license plates for display until 1909, when the state began to issue plates. Beginning in 1910, plates were issued in sequential order from the number 1 upwards.

As of 2026, plates are issued by the Delaware Department of Transportation (DelDOT) through its Division of Motor Vehicles. Only rear plates have been required on standard passenger vehicles since 1945. All plates issued since 1942 can still be used with current stickers. Authorized reproductions of porcelain enamel plates can be obtained through a private vendor, provided they fall within the state's guidelines.

In 1956, the United States, Canada, and Mexico came to an agreement with the American Association of Motor Vehicle Administrators, the Automobile Manufacturers Association and the National Safety Council that standardized the size for license plates for vehicles (except those for motorcycles) at 6 inches (15 cm) in height by 12 inches (30 cm) in width, with standardized mounting holes. The first Delaware license plate that complied with these standards was issued in 1958.

Delaware allows plate-owners to transfer the rights to display a particular number on their vehicle. The inherent scarcity of low-digit plates has spawned a vibrant secondary market for low numbers.

== Secondary market ==
In Delaware, plate number 1 is reserved for the governor, 2 for the lieutenant governor, and 3 for the secretary of state. But all other numbers 4 and higher are allowed to be traded. Additionally, plates up to 87,000 are allowed to display replica porcelain enamel plates. These factors have caused low plate-numbers to become positional goods and status symbols.

Marketplaces have been created to facilitate exchanges. As of August 2023, one such market, Low Digit Plates, has priced five-digit plates in the low-thousands of dollars, and three-digit plates approaching $70,000. Single-digit plates are particularly valuable. Plate number 9 was traded for $185,000 in 1994 (equivalent to $402,000 in 2025). In 2008, number 6 went for $675,000 ($1,009,000 in 2025).

== Passenger baseplates ==
This is a list of the plate templates used by Delaware.

=== 1909 to 1942 ===
No slogans were used on passenger plates during the period covered by this subsection.

Image	First issued	Design	Serial format	Serials issued	Notes
	1909	White on black porcelain; "DEL. 1909" at top	1234	1001 to approximately 1500	Serials followed on from those on pre-state-issued plates.
	1910	Black on white porcelain; "DEL. 1910" at top	123	1 to approximately 900	
	1911	White on dark blue porcelain; "DEL. 1911" at top	1234	1 to approximately 1300	
	1912	White on maroon porcelain; "DEL. 1912" at top	1234	1 to approximately 1800	
	1913	White on black porcelain; vertical "DEL" and "1913" at left and right respectively	1234	1 to approximately 2000	
	1913	As above, but with "DEL 13" at right	1234	2001 to approximately 2500	
	1914	Yellow on black porcelain; "DEL 14" at right	1234	1 to approximately 3200	
	1915	Blue on white porcelain; "DEL 15" at right	1234	1 to approximately 4700	
	1916	White on dark green; "DEL 16" at right	1234	1 to approximately 7000	
	1917	White on black; "DEL 17" at right	1234	1 to approximately 10700	
	1918	White on brown; "DEL 18" at right	12345	1 to approximately 13000	
	1919	White on dark blue with border line; "DEL 19" at right	12345	1 to approximately 13100	
	1920	Black on light green with border line; "DEL 20" at right	12345	1 to approximately 18100	
	1921	Red on white with border line; "DEL 21" at right	12345	1 to approximately 20800	
	1922	Blue on white with border line; "DEL 22" at right	12-345	1 to approximately 23-300	
	1923	White on black with border line; "DEL 23" at right	12-345	1 to approximately 25-000	
	1924	Brown on white with border line; "DEL 24" at right	12-345	1 to 20-000; 30-001 to approximately 39-000	Serials 20-001 through 30-000 reserved for commercial vehicles.
	1925	Black on orange with border line; "DEL 25" at right	12-345	1 to 30-000; 45-001 to approximately 48-000	Serials 30-001 through 45-000 reserved for commercial vehicles and tractor units.
	1926	Yellow on blue with border line; "DEL 26" at right	12-345	1 to approximately 37-000	
	1927	Red on gray with border line; "DEL 27" at right	12-345	1 to approximately 40-000	
	1928	Black on white with border line; "DEL 28" at right	12-345	1 to approximately 50-000	
	1929	Blue on golden yellow with border line; diamond at left and "DEL 29" at right	12-345	1 to approximately 47-000	
	1930	Golden yellow on blue with border line; diamond at left and "DEL 30" at right	12-345	1 to approximately 45-000	
	1931	As 1929 base, but with "DEL 31" at right	12-345	1 to approximately 48-000	
	1932	As 1930 base, but with "DEL '32" at right	12-345	1 to approximately 47-000	
	1933	As 1929 base, but with "DEL '33" at right	12-345	1 to approximately 48-000	
	1934	As 1930 base, but with "DEL '34" at right	12-345	1 to approximately 47-000	
	1935	As 1929 base, but with "DEL '35" at right	12-345	1 to approximately 48-000	
	1936	Golden yellow on blue with border line; "DELAWARE – 36" at bottom	12♦345	1 to approximately 51♦000	First use of the full state name.
	1937	Blue on golden yellow with border line; "DELAWARE – 37" at bottom	12♦345	1 to approximately 53♦000	
	1938	Red on silver with border line; "DELAWARE – 38" at bottom	12♦345	1 to approximately 55♦000	
	1939	Silver on maroon with border line; "DELAWARE – 39" at bottom	12♦345	1 to approximately 58♦000	
	1940	Blue on golden yellow; "DEL. EX. 3-31-41" at bottom	12♦345	1 to approximately 60♦000	
	1941	Golden yellow on blue; "DELAWARE 3-31-42" at top	12♦345	1 to approximately 59♦000	

=== 1942 to present ===
Image	First issued	Design	Slogan	Serial format	Serials issued	Notes
	1942	White on black porcelain; "DEL." at top with tab slots to left and right	none	12♦345	1 to approximately 87♦000^{1}	Measures 5.5" x 9.5". Month/day tab (3/31 in black on white, 6/30 in white on green, 9/30 in white on red, or 12/31 in white on brown) fitted at top left and year tab (even-numbered years in blue on gold and odd-numbered years in gold on blue) at top right until 1963, when sticker revalidation commenced. Issued in pairs until 1945; only rear plates have been required ever since. Authorized modern reproductions allowed.
	1947	Riveted polished stainless steel serial on black painted stainless steel base plate. Base embossed with Delaware on top. Insert space at bottom. Insert format continued as original.	none	123456	1 to 200000^{1}	Plates varied in size: 5-digit 9.5 x 5.5 in 6 digit 11 x 5.5 in. Renewed with metal tabs.
	1951	Riveted reflective white scotchlite painted stainless steel serial on black painted stainless steel base plate. Base plate embossed with Delaware on top. Insert spaces at bottom. Insert format continued as original.	none	123456	1 to 200000^{1}	Plates were smaller than the 6 digit plates if they were 5 digits or lower. Renewed with metal tabs.
	1954	Riveted reflective-coated steel serial on black painted stainless steel base plate. Base plate embossed with Delaware on top. Insert spaces at bottom. Insert format continued as original.	none	123456	1 to 200000^{1}	Plates with or less 5 digits were smaller than 6 digit plates. Renewed with metal tabs.
	1958	Riveted gold serial on reflective dark blue plate; "DELAWARE" centered at top; tab slots at bottom	none	123456	4 to approximately 213000^{1-2}	First 6" x 12" plate. Validated with tabs until 1963, and with stickers thereafter.
	1962	Riveted gold serial on reflective dark blue plate; "DELAWARE" centered at bottom	"THE FIRST STATE" centered at top	123456	4 to approximately 262000^{1-2}	Validated with stickers.
	1969	Screened gold serial on reflective dark blue plate with gold border; "DELAWARE" centered at bottom	"THE FIRST STATE" centered at top	123456	4 to 999999^{1-2}	Several variations of the font used for the serial exist. Some replacement plates have riveted numbers.
	2008	Screened gold serial on reflective dark blue plate with gold border; "DELAWARE" centered at bottom	"THE FIRST STATE" centered at top	123456	4 to 999999^{1-2}	Plates have a beveled edge around the plate as opposed to the previous all-flat plates.

Notes:
1 The state recycles serials, so they can be found on any base.
2 Serials 1, 2 and 3 reserved for the Governor, Lieutenant Governor and Secretary of State respectively. Plates with these serials are blue on gold with the state's coat of arms at the left.

== Non-passenger plates ==
Delaware does not use leading zeros on its plates, so serials are composed of a variable number of digits.

Image	Type	Slogan	Serial format	Notes
	Commercial	The First State	C123456; C/L123456	
	Dealer	The First State	D12345	
	Farm Truck	The First State	FT1234	
	Handicapped	The First State	HP12345	International Symbol of Access at left.
	Limousine	The First State	LX1234	
	Motorcycle	none	12345	"M/C" at bottom left.
	Pleasure Commercial	The First State	P/C123456	Issued to station wagons and sport utility vehicles.
	Recreational Trailer	The First State	RT1234	
	Recreational Vehicle	The First State	RV12345	
	State-Owned	The First State	S1234	
	Street Rod	The First State	SR123	
	Taxi	The First State	TX1234	
	Temporary Registration	The First State	XA123456	Delaware started issuing temporary tags with an all-numeric format, then moved to the letter X as a prefix, then XA, XB, XC, XD, XP then XQ as of June 19, 2021
	Trailer	The First State	T123456	

== Optional plates ==
Delaware does not use leading zeros on its plates, so serials are composed of a variable number of digits.

Image	Type	Serial format	Notes
	Centennial of Delaware License Plates	Remakes of passenger serials: 123456; Remakes of pleasure commercial serials: P/C123456	Issued from October 1, 2008, through December 31, 2009. Awarded "Plate of the Year" for best new license plate of 2008 by the Automobile License Plate Collectors Association, the first time Delaware was so honored.
	Disabled American Veterans	^{123}_{DAV}	
	Duck	Remakes of passenger serials: 123456	A portion of the proceeds from this license plate's sales benefit Delaware's two National Estuary Programs: the Center for the Inland Bays and the Partnership for the Delaware Estuary. These funds are used to improve the health of Delaware's coastal waterways, bays, and estuaries.
	Lighthouse	Remakes of passenger serials: 123456; Remakes of pleasure commercial serials: P/C123456	A portion of the proceeds from this license plate's sales benefit Delaware's two National Estuary Programs: the Center for the Inland Bays and the Partnership for the Delaware Estuary. These funds are used to improve the health of Delaware's coastal waterways and bays, or "estuaries."
	Lighthouse—Personalized	various	A portion of the proceeds from this license plate's sales benefit Delaware's two National Estuary Program's: the Center for the Inland Bays and the Partnership for the Delaware Estuary. These funds are used to improve the health of Delaware's coastal waterways and bays, or "estuaries."
	Passenger—Personalized	various	
	Purple Heart	P/H1234	
	State Legislators	Legislators' initials: A. B. C.	
	Support Pollinators	Remakes of passenger serials: 123456	First issued June 2021. Awarded "Plate of the Year" for best new license plate of 2021 by the Automobile License Plate Collectors Association, the second time Delaware was so honored.
	Telephone Pioneers	TP1234	
	University of Delaware	UD1234	
	Volunteer Firefighter	V/F1234	
