= Vehicle registration plates of Vermont =

Vermont vehicle license plates

Vermont
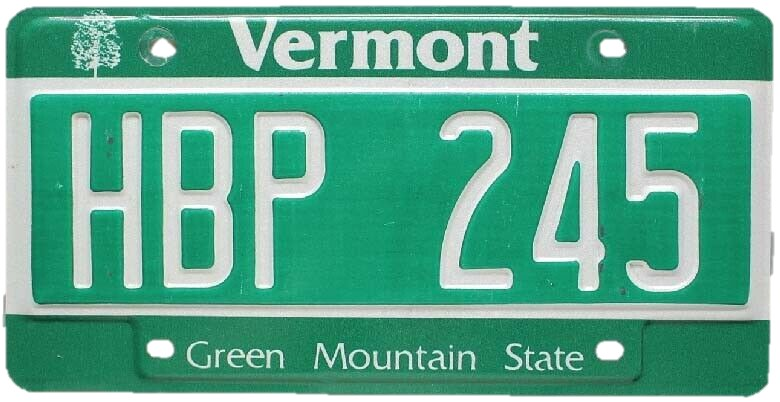

Current series
- Slogan: Green Mountain State
- Size: 12 in × 6 in 30 cm × 15 cm
- Material: Aluminum
- Serial format: ABC 123
- Introduced: January 1, 1990

Availability
- Issued by: Vermont Agency of Transportation, Vermont Department of Motor Vehicles

History
- First issued: May 1, 1905

The U.S. state of Vermont first required its residents to register their motor vehicles and display license plates in 1905. As of 2026, plates are issued by the Vermont Department of Motor Vehicles (DMV), associated with the Vermont Agency of Transportation. Front and rear plates are required for most classes of vehicles, while only rear plates are required for motorcycles and trailers.

== Passenger baseplates ==
=== 1905 to 1966 ===
In 1956, the United States, Canada, and Mexico came to an agreement with the American Association of Motor Vehicle Administrators, the Automobile Manufacturers Association and the National Safety Council that standardized the size for license plates for vehicles (except those for motorcycles) at 6 inches (15 cm) in height by 12 inches (30 cm) in width, with standardized mounting holes. The 1956 (dated 1957) issue was the first Vermont license plate that complied with these standards.

Image	Dates issued	Design	Slogan	Serial format	Serials issued	Notes
	1905–07	White serial on blue porcelain plate; "VERMONT AUTOMOBILE REGISTER" centered at top	none	123	1 to approximately 999	
	1907–09	Black serial on white porcelain plate with border line; "VT." at right	none	1234	1 to approximately 2000	
	1909	Black serial on white porcelain plate with border line; "VT. 1909" at right	none	1234	1 to approximately 2000	First dated plate.
	1910	As 1909 base, but with "VT. 1910" at right	none	1234	1 to approximately 2500	
	1911	As 1909 base, but with "VT. 1911" at right	none	1234	1 to approximately 3300	
	1912	As 1909 base, but with "VT. 1912" at right	none	1234	1 to approximately 4300	
	1913	Black serial on white porcelain plate with border line; vertical "VT" and "1913" at left and right respectively	none	1234	1 to approximately 6000	
	1914	Black serial on white porcelain plate with border line; vertical "1914" and "VT" at left and right respectively	none	1234	1 to approximately 8300	
	1915	Black serial on white porcelain plate with border line; vertical "VT" and "1915" at left and right respectively	none	12345	1 to approximately 11500	
	1916	Embossed white serial on dark blue plate with border line; vertical "VT" at right	none	12345	1 to approximately 15600	First embossed plate.
	1917	Embossed blue serial on white plate with border line; vertical "VT" at right	none	12345	1 to approximately 20300	
	1918	Embossed golden yellow serial on green plate with border line; vertical "VT" at right	none	12345	1 to approximately 22500	
	1919	Embossed blue serial on off-white plate with border line; "VT 19" at right	none	12345	1 to approximately 26700	
	1920	Embossed white serial on black plate with border line; "VT 20" at left	none	12-345	1 to approximately 32-000	
	1921	Embossed black serial on white plate; "VT 21" at left	none	12-345	1 to approximately 37-000	
	1922	Embossed blue serial on white plate; "VT 22" at right	none	12-345	1 to approximately 42-000	
	1923	Embossed black serial on yellow plate with border line; "VT 23" at left	none	12-345	100 to approximately 48-000	
	1924	Embossed black serial on silver plate with border line; "VT 24" at right	none	12-345	100 to approximately 57-000	
	1925	Embossed golden yellow serial on green plate with border line; "VT 25" at left	none	12-345	100 to approximately 64-000	
	1926	Embossed green serial on golden yellow plate with border line; "VERMONT 1926" at bottom	none	12-345	1 to approximately 69-000	
	1927	Embossed golden yellow serial on green plate with border line; "VERMONT 1927" at bottom	none	12-345	1 to approximately 75-000	
	1928	Embossed green serial on golden yellow plate with border line; "VERMONT 1928" at top	none	12-345	1 to approximately 80-000	
	1929	Embossed tan serial on maroon plate with border line; "VERMONT 1929" at bottom	none	12-345	1 to approximately 85-000	
	1930	Embossed maroon serial on tan plate with border line; "VERMONT 1930" at bottom	none	12-345	1 to approximately 85-000	
	1931	Embossed white serial on dark blue plate with border line; "VERMONT 1931" at top	none	12-345	1 to approximately 76-000	
	1932	Embossed dark blue serial on white plate with border line; "VERMONT 1932" at bottom	none	12-345	1 to approximately 70-000	
	1933	Embossed white serial on dark blue plate with border line; "VERMONT 1933" at top	none	12-345	101 to approximately 69-000	
	1934	Embossed dark blue serial on white plate with border line; "VERMONT 1934" at top	none	12-345	101 to approximately 66-000	
	1935–36	Embossed white serial on dark blue plate with border line; "VERMONT 1935" at bottom	none	12-345	101 to approximately 73-000	Validated through March 31, 1936.
	1936–37	Embossed dark blue serial on white plate with border line; "VERMONT EXPIRES MARCH 31 1937" at bottom	none	12-345	1 to approximately 77-000	
	1937–38	Embossed white serial on dark blue plate with border line; "VERMONT TO APR. 1 1938" at bottom	none	12-345	1 to approximately 77-000	
	1938	Embossed dark blue serial on white plate; "19 VERMONT 38" at bottom	none	12 345	1 to approximately 78 000	
	1939	Embossed white serial on dark blue plate; "19 VERMONT 39" at bottom	none	12 345	1 to approximately 81 000	
	1940	Embossed dark blue serial on white plate; "19 VERMONT 40" at bottom	none	12 345	1 to approximately 84 000	
	1941	Embossed white serial on dark blue plate; "19 VERMONT 41" at top	none	12 345	1 to approximately 87 000	
	1942–43	Embossed dark blue serial on white plate; "19 VERMONT 42" at bottom	none	12 345	1 to approximately 88 000	Revalidated for 1943 with yellow tabs, due to metal conservation for World War II.
	1944	Embossed black serial on white plate; "VERMONT 44" at bottom	none	12345	1 to approximately 74000	
	1945	Embossed white serial on dark blue plate; "VERMONT 45" at bottom	none	12345	1 to approximately 81000	
	1946	Embossed black serial on white plate; "VERMONT 46" at bottom	none	12345	1 to approximately 88000	
	1947	Embossed white serial on black plate; "47 VERMONT" at bottom	none	12345	1 to approximately 93000	
	1948	Embossed gold serial on dark green plate; "48 VERMONT" centered at bottom	"GREEN MOUNTAINS" centered at top	12345	1 to approximately 96000	Most recent passenger base to use a color other than green or white.
	1949	Embossed dark green serial on white plate; "VERMONT 49" centered at bottom	"GREEN MOUNTAINS" centered at top	12345	1 to approximately 99000	
	1950	Embossed white serial on dark green plate with border line; "50 VERMONT" centered at bottom	"GREEN MOUNTAINS" centered at top	12345	1 to 99999	
	1950	Embossed white serial on dark green plate with border line; "50 VERMONT" centered at bottom	"GREEN MOUNTAINS" centered at top	K1234	K101 to approximately K5000	
	1951	Embossed white serial on dark green plate; "VERMONT 51" centered at bottom	none	A123	A1 to W999	Letters I, O, Q, T, X and Y not used in serials.
	1951	Embossed white serial on dark green plate; "VERMONT 51" centered at bottom	none	AB123	AB1 to approximately GR999	Letters I, O, Q, T, X and Y not used in serials.
	1952	Embossed dark green serial on white plate; "52 VERMONT" centered at bottom	none	12345	1 to 99999	
	1952	Embossed dark green serial on white plate; "52 VERMONT" centered at bottom	none	A1234	E1 to approximately E9999	
	1953	As 1951 base, but with "VERMONT 53" at bottom	none	12345	1 to 99999	
	1953	As 1951 base, but with "VERMONT 53" at bottom	none	A1234	A1 to A9999; E1 to approximately E2400	
	1954	As 1952 base, but with "54 VERMONT" at bottom	none	12345	1 to 99999	
	1954	As 1952 base, but with "54 VERMONT" at bottom	none	A1234	A1 to A9999; E1 to approximately E6200	
	1955	As 1951 base, but with "VERMONT 55" at bottom	none	12345	1 to 99999	
	1955	As 1951 base, but with "VERMONT 55" at bottom	none	A1234	A and E series; C1 to approximately C900	
	1956	As 1952 base, but with "56 VERMONT" at bottom	none	12345	1 to 99999	
	1956	As 1952 base, but with "56 VERMONT" at bottom	none	A1234	A and E series; C1 to approximately C5000	
	1957	Embossed white serial on dark green plate; "VERMONT" centered at bottom; "57" at bottom right	"SEE" to left of state name, giving "SEE VERMONT"	12345	1 to 99999	First 6" x 12" plate.
	1957	Embossed white serial on dark green plate; "VERMONT" centered at bottom; "57" at bottom right	"SEE" to left of state name, giving "SEE VERMONT"	A1234	A and E series; C1 to approximately C7400	First 6" x 12" plate.
	1958	Embossed dark green serial on white plate; "VERMONT" centered at bottom; "58" at bottom right	"SEE" to left of state name, giving "SEE VERMONT"	12345	1 to 99999	
	1958	Embossed dark green serial on white plate; "VERMONT" centered at bottom; "58" at bottom right	"SEE" to left of state name, giving "SEE VERMONT"	A1234	A and E series; C1 to approximately C6100	
	1959	As 1957 base, but with "59" at bottom right	"SEE" as on 1957 base	12345	1 to 99999	
	1959	As 1957 base, but with "59" at bottom right	"SEE" as on 1957 base	A1234	A, E and C series; B1 to approximately B100	
	1960	As 1958 base, but with "60" at bottom right	"SEE" as on 1958 base	12345	1 to 99999	
	1960	As 1958 base, but with "60" at bottom right	"SEE" as on 1958 base	A1234	A, E and C series; B1 to approximately B3100	
	1961	As 1957 base, but with "61" at bottom right	"SEE" as on 1957 base	12345	1 to 99999	D series not used.
	1961	As 1957 base, but with "61" at bottom right	"SEE" as on 1957 base	A1234	A1 to approximately E5600	D series not used.
	1962	As 1958 base, but with "62" at bottom right	"SEE" as on 1958 base	12345	1 to 99999	
	1962	As 1958 base, but with "62" at bottom right	"SEE" as on 1958 base	A1234	A1 to approximately E9100	
	1963	As 1957 base, but with "63" at bottom right	"SEE" as on 1957 base	12345	1 to 99999	
	1963	As 1957 base, but with "63" at bottom right	"SEE" as on 1957 base	A1234	A1 to approximately F2800	
	1964	As 1958 base, but with "64" at bottom right	"SEE" as on 1958 base	12345	1 to 99999	
	1964	As 1958 base, but with "64" at bottom right	"SEE" as on 1958 base	A1234	A1 to approximately F7100	
	1965	As 1957 base, but with "65" at bottom right	"SEE" as on 1957 base	12345	1 to 99999	
	1965	As 1957 base, but with "65" at bottom right	"SEE" as on 1957 base	A1234	A1 to approximately F8500	
	1966	As 1958 base, but with "66" at bottom right	"SEE" as on 1958 base	12345	1 to 99999	
	1966	As 1958 base, but with "66" at bottom right	"SEE" as on 1958 base	A1234	A1 to approximately F7800	

=== 1967 to present ===
Image	Dates issued	Design	Slogan	Serial format	Serials issued	Notes
	1967–68	Debossed white serial on green plate with border line; "VERMONT" centered at bottom; rectangular sticker box at bottom left and "67" at bottom right	none	123456	1 to approximately 187000	Shade of green changed from forest green to the kelly green still used today.
	1969–71	Debossed white serial on green plate with border line; "VERMONT" centered at bottom; rectangular sticker box at bottom right	"SEE" to left of state name, giving "SEE VERMONT"	A·1234	A·100 to Y·9999	Letters I, J, O, Q, W and Z not used in serials; this practice continued until 1984.
	1969–71	Debossed white serial on green plate with border line; "VERMONT" centered at bottom; rectangular sticker box at bottom right	"SEE" to left of state name, giving "SEE VERMONT"	1234·A	100·A to approximately 7000·E	Letters I, J, O, Q, W and Z not used in serials; this practice continued until 1984.
	1972–76	Similar to 1969–71 base, but with state name, slogan and sticker box at top rather than bottom	"SEE" as on 1969–71 base, but at top	A·1234	A·100 to Y·9999	In the AB·123 serial format, the first letter was strictly A through L and the second letter was strictly M through Y.
	1972–76	Similar to 1969–71 base, but with state name, slogan and sticker box at top rather than bottom	"SEE" as on 1969–71 base, but at top	1234·A	100·A to 9999·L	In the AB·123 serial format, the first letter was strictly A through L and the second letter was strictly M through Y.
	1972–76	Similar to 1969–71 base, but with state name, slogan and sticker box at top rather than bottom	"SEE" as on 1969–71 base, but at top	AB·123	AM·100 to LY·999	In the AB·123 serial format, the first letter was strictly A through L and the second letter was strictly M through Y.
	1972–76	Similar to 1969–71 base, but with state name, slogan and sticker box at top rather than bottom	"SEE" as on 1969–71 base, but at top	A123B	A100A to approximately A999B	In the AB·123 serial format, the first letter was strictly A through L and the second letter was strictly M through Y.
	1977–84	Debossed white serial on green plate with border line; "VERMONT" centered at bottom; round sticker box at bottom left and rectangular sticker box at bottom right	"GREEN MOUNTAINS" centered at top	A·1234	A·100 to Y·9999	Round sticker box never used. Letter W added to serials in 1984. Revalidated until 1989.
	1977–84	Debossed white serial on green plate with border line; "VERMONT" centered at bottom; round sticker box at bottom left and rectangular sticker box at bottom right	"GREEN MOUNTAINS" centered at top	1234·A	100·A to 9999·Y	Round sticker box never used. Letter W added to serials in 1984. Revalidated until 1989.
	1977–84	Debossed white serial on green plate with border line; "VERMONT" centered at bottom; round sticker box at bottom left and rectangular sticker box at bottom right	"GREEN MOUNTAINS" centered at top	AB123	AM100 to YY999	Round sticker box never used. Letter W added to serials in 1984. Revalidated until 1989.
	1977–84	Debossed white serial on green plate with border line; "VERMONT" centered at bottom; round sticker box at bottom left and rectangular sticker box at bottom right	"GREEN MOUNTAINS" centered at top	123AB	100AB to approximately 999EC	Round sticker box never used. Letter W added to serials in 1984. Revalidated until 1989.
	1985–87	Debossed white serial on green plate; screened white rectangular box around serial; "Vermont" screened in white centered at top; white sugar maple screened at top left	"Green Mountain State" screened in white centered at bottom	1A234	1A100 to 9Y999	
	1987–89	Debossed white serial on green plate; screened white rectangular box around serial; "Vermont" screened in white centered at top; white sugar maple screened at top left	"Green Mountain State" screened in white centered at bottom	123A4	100A1 to 999Y9	
	1989	Debossed white serial on green plate; screened white rectangular box around serial; "Vermont" screened in white centered at top; white sugar maple screened at top left	"Green Mountain State" screened in white centered at bottom	1AB23	1AA00 to approximately 9FF99	Issued as replacements for 1977–84 plates.
	1989	Debossed white serial on green plate; screened white rectangular box around serial; "Vermont" screened in white centered at top; white sugar maple screened at top left	"Green Mountain State" screened in white centered at bottom	12AB3	10AA0 to approximately 99BC9	Issued only to new registrants.
	January 1, 1990 – present	Debossed white serial on green plate; screened white rectangular box around serial; "Vermont" screened in white centered at top; white sugar maple screened at top left	"Green Mountain State" screened in white centered at bottom	ABC 123	Intermingled with truck, municipal and (large) trailer plates from AAB 100 to BNF 999; exclusively from BNG 100 to KXA 509 (as of May 11, 2025)	Narrow serial dies introduced. Same format used on Trailer (Large) and Municipal plates, and on Truck plates until 2009. Letters I, J, O, Q and U not used. Letters V and Z traditionally skipped, but are now used as of January 2024, starting with the KPV series.

== Non-passenger plates ==
Image	Type	Design	Serial format	Serials issued	Notes
	Apportioned Bus	As current passenger base, but with "APPORTIONED" in place of slogan; "BUS" debossed vertically to left of serial	12B34	10B00 to present	
	Apportioned Truck	As current passenger base, but with "APPORTIONED" in place of slogan; "TRK" debossed vertically to left of serial	12A34	10A00 to present	B series reserved for Apportioned Bus.
	Disabled	As current passenger base	A1234	A1000 to present	
	Motorcycle	Debossed white serial on green plate with border line; "VERMONT" at top left and "MOTORCYCLE" at bottom; debossed box for revalidation sticker at top right	AB123	AA100 to present	
	Municipal	As current passenger base, but red rather than green; "MUN" debossed vertically to left of serial	ABC 123	AAA100 to present	Serials start with AA or AB.
	Street Rod	As current passenger base; "STREET RODS" debossed diagonally to left of serial	SR123	SR001 to present	
	Trailer (Large)	As current passenger base; "TRA" debossed vertically to left of serial	ABC 123	AAA100 to present	
	Trailer (Small)	As Motorcycle plate, but with "TRAILER" at bottom	A12345	A10000 to present	
	Truck	As current passenger base; "TRK" debossed vertically to left of serial	123A456	100A100 to present	Current serial format introduced mid-2009 after the truck allocations intermingled with passenger plates in the ABC 123 format were discontinued for this format.
