= Vehicle registration plates of Kentucky =

Kentucky vehicle license plates

Kentucky
Current series
- Slogan: Bluegrass State; In God We Trust (alternative since 2011)
- Size: 12 in × 6 in 30 cm × 15 cm
- Material: Aluminum
- Serial format: A1B234; ABC123
- Introduced: September 21, 2020

Availability
- Issued by: Kentucky Transportation Cabinet, Division of Motor Vehicle Licensing
- Manufactured by: Roederer Correctional Complex, La Grange, Kentucky

History
- First issued: March 23, 1910

The U.S. state of Kentucky first required its residents to register their motor vehicles and display license plates in 1910. As of 2026, plates are issued by the Kentucky Transportation Cabinet through its Division of Motor Vehicle Licensing. Only rear plates have been required since 1944.

== Passenger baseplates ==
=== 1910 to 1974 ===
In 1956, the United States, Canada, and Mexico came to an agreement with the American Association of Motor Vehicle Administrators, the Automobile Manufacturers Association, and the National Safety Council that standardized the size for license plates for vehicles (except those for motorcycles) at six inches (150 mm) tall by twelve inches (300 mm) wide, with standardized mounting holes.

Image	Dates issued	Design	Slogan	Serial format	Serials issued	Notes
	1910–11	White serial on black porcelain plate; vertical "KY" at right, above circle containing 'B'	none	1234	1 to approximately 3200	Front and rear plates issued; this practice continued through 1943.
	1911–12	White serial on black porcelain plate; vertical "KY" at right, above circle containing 'L'	none	1234	4001 to approximately 8300	
	1912–13	White serial on black porcelain plate; white horizontal stripes at top and bottom; vertical "KY" at right, above square containing 'M'	none	1234	1 to approximately 8000	
	1913–14	White serial on black porcelain plate; red horizontal stripes at top and bottom; vertical "KY" at right, above diamond containing red 'G'	none	12345	10001 to approximately 19000	
	1914	Embossed black serial on white plate; "KY 1914" at right	none	12345	20001 to approximately 26400	First dated and embossed plate. Issued only from June through December 1914.
	1915	Embossed red serial on white plate; "KY 1915" at right	none	12345	1 to approximately 19500	
	1916	Embossed white serial on blue plate; "KY 1916" at right	none	12345	1 to approximately 29500	
	1917	Embossed black serial on white plate with border line; "KY. 1917" at right	none	12345	1 to approximately 47500	
	1918	Embossed yellow serial on black plate with border line; "KY. 1918" at right	none	12345	1 to approximately 64000	
	1919	Embossed white serial on green plate with border line; "KY. 1919" at right	none	12345	1 to approximately 81000	
	1920	Embossed black serial on white plate with border line; "KY. 1920" at right	none	12345	1 to approximately 96000	
	1921	Embossed white serial on brown plate with border line; "KY. 1921" at right	none	123456	1 to approximately 157000	
	1922	Embossed black serial on orange plate with border line; "KY. 1922" at right	none	123456	1 to approximately 167000	
	1923	Embossed blue serial on gray plate with border line; "KY. 1923" at right	none	123456	1 to approximately 185000	
	1924	Embossed white serial on dark blue plate with border line; "KY 1924" at right	none	123456		
	1925	Embossed white serial on green plate with border line; "KENTUCKY·1925" centered at bottom	none	123-456		First use of the full state name.
	1926	Embossed white serial on maroon plate with border line; "KENTUCKY·1926" centered at bottom	none	123-456		
	1927	Embossed white serial on blue plate. Plate divided into four sections, each surrounded by border lines, with "KY", county name and "27" in top section and serial numbers in bottom left and bottom right sections	none	12 34; 12 345	Began at 1 in each county	First state-issued passenger plate in the U.S. to feature the name of the county of issuance.
	1928	Embossed white serial on green plate. Plate divided into four sections, each surrounded by border lines, with "KY. 28" in bottom center section, county name in top section and serial numbers in bottom left and bottom right sections	none	12 34; 12 345	Began at 1 in each county	
	1929	Pair of plates with blue base with white embossed lettering and border. Front: top of plate emblazoned with "19 KENTUCKY 29" with county name at bottom. Serial numbers in center separated by "FRONT" in small letters in middle. Rear: top of plate emblazoned with "19 KENTUCKY 29" with "FOR" in center of plate between serial numbers and "PROGRESS" emblazoned at bottom.	"FOR PROGRESS" on rear plates (see left)	123-456	1 to 850-000 (see right)	A block of serials was assigned to each county in alphabetical order; this practice continued through 1936.
	1930	Pair of plates, each with white base with red embossed lettering and border. Front: top of plate emblazoned with "19 KENTUCKY 30" with county name at bottom and serial numbers in center. Rear: top of plate emblazoned with "19 KENTUCKY 30" with serial in center of plate and "FOR PROGRESS" emblazoned at bottom.	"FOR PROGRESS" on rear plates (see left)	123-456	1 to 850-000	
	1931	Embossed white serial on green plate with border line; "19 KENTUCKY 31" (on front plates) or "KY", county name and "31" (on rear plates) at bottom	none	123-456	1 to 850-000	
	1932	Embossed white serial on maroon plate with border line; "19 KENTUCKY 32" (on front plates) or "KY", county name and "32" (on rear plates) at bottom	none	123-456	1 to 850-000	
	1933	Embossed white serial on green plate with border line; "KY", county name and "33" at bottom	none	123-456	1 to 850-000	
	1934	Embossed black serial on white plate with border line; "KY", county name and "34" at top	none	123-456	1 to 850-000	
	1935	Embossed black serial on yellow plate with border line; "KY", county name and "35" at bottom	none	123-456	1 to 850-000	
	1936	Embossed silver serial on black plate with border line; "KY", county name and "36" at bottom	none	123-456	1 to 850-000	
	1937	Embossed dark blue serial on white plate with border line; "KENTUCKY-'37" and county name centered at top and bottom respectively	none	12345; A1234; 1A234; 12A34; 123A4	Issued in blocks by county	
	1938	Embossed green serial on white plate with border line; "KENTUCKY-'38" and county name centered at top and bottom respectively	none	12345; A1234; 1A234; 12A34; 123A4	Issued in blocks by county	
	1939	Embossed white serial on green plate with border line; "KENTUCKY-'39" and county name centered at top and bottom respectively	none	12345; A1234; 1A234; 12A34; 123A4	Issued in blocks by county	
	1940	Embossed red serial on white plate with border line; "KENTUCKY-'40" and county name centered at top and bottom respectively	none	12345; A1234; 1A234; 12A34; 123A4	Issued in blocks by county	
	1941	Embossed black serial on silver plate with border line; "KENTUCKY-'41" and county name centered at top and bottom respectively	none	12345; A1234; 1A234; 12A34; 123A4	Issued in blocks by county	
	1942–43	Embossed silver serial on black plate with border line; "KENTUCKY-'42" and county name centered at top and bottom respectively	none	12345; A1234; 1A234; 12A34; 123A4	Issued in blocks by county	Revalidated for 1943 with windshield stickers, due to metal conservation for World War II.
	1944–45	Embossed yellow serial on black plate with border line; "KENTUCKY-'44" and county name centered at top and bottom respectively	none	12345; A1234; 1A234; 12A34; 123A4	Issued in blocks by county	Only rear plates issued; this practice continues today. Revalidated for 1945 with windshield stickers.
	1946–47	Embossed silver serial on black plate with border line; "KENTUCKY-'46" and county name centered at top and bottom respectively	none	123-456	Issued in blocks by county	Revalidated for 1947 with windshield stickers.
	1948	Embossed orange serial on unpainted aluminum plate; "KENTUCKY-'48" and county name centered at top and bottom respectively	none	123-456	Issued in blocks by county	
	1949	Embossed black serial on waffle-textured silver plate; "KENTUCKY-'49" and county name centered at top and bottom respectively	none	123-456	Issued in blocks by county	
	1950	Embossed white serial on waffle-textured green plate; "KENTUCKY-'50" and county name centered at top and bottom respectively	none	123-456	Issued in blocks by county	
	1951–52	Embossed black serial on silver plate; county name centered at bottom	"TOUR KENTUCKY-'51" centered at top	123-456	Issued in blocks by county	Revalidated for 1952 with windshield stickers, due to metal conservation for the Korean War.
	1953	Embossed white serial on dark blue plate; county name centered at bottom	"TOUR KENTUCKY-'53" centered at top	123-456	Issued in blocks by county	
	1954	Embossed dark blue serial on white plate; county name centered at bottom	"TOUR KENTUCKY-'54" centered at top	123-456	Issued in blocks by county	
	1955	Embossed white serial on dark blue plate; county name centered at bottom	"TOUR KENTUCKY-'55" centered at top	123-456	Issued in blocks by county	
	1956	Embossed dark blue serial on white plate; "19" at top left and "56" at top right; county name centered at bottom	"TOUR KENTUCKY" centered at top	123-456	Issued in blocks by county	
	1957	Embossed white serial on dark blue plate; "19" at top left and "57" at top right; county name centered at bottom	"TOUR KENTUCKY" centered at top	123-456; A12-345	Issued in blocks by county	One-letter, five-digit serials introduced in counties that had exhausted their all-numeric allocations.
	1958	Embossed dark blue serial on white plate; "19 KENTUCKY 58" at top; county name centered at bottom	none	123-456; A12-345	Issued in blocks by county	
	1959	Embossed white serial on dark blue plate; "19 KENTUCKY 59" at top; county name centered at bottom	none	123-456; A12-345	Issued in blocks by county	
	1960	As 1958 base, but with "60" at top right	none	123-456; A12-345	Issued in blocks by county	
	1961	As 1959 base, but with "61" at top right	none	123-456; A12-345	Issued in blocks by county	
	1962	As 1958 base, but with "62" at top right; border line added on later plates	none	123-456; A12-345	Issued in blocks by county	
	1963	Embossed white serial on dark blue plate with border line; "19 KENTUCKY 63" at top; county name centered at bottom	none	123-456; A12-345	Issued in blocks by county	
	1964	Embossed dark blue serial on white plate with border line; "19 KENTUCKY 64" at top; county name centered at bottom	none	123-456; A12-345	Issued in blocks by county	
	1965	As 1963 base, but with "65" at top right	none	123-456; A12-345	Issued in blocks by county	
	1966	As 1964 base, but with "66" at top right	none	123-456; A12-345	Issued in blocks by county	
	1967	As 1963 base, but with "67" at top right	none	123-456; A12-345	Issued in blocks by county	
	1968	As 1964 base, but with "68" at top right	none	123-456; A12-345	Issued in blocks by county	
	1969	As 1963 base, but with "69" at top right	none	123-456; A12-345	Issued in blocks by county	
	1970	As 1964 base, but with "70" at top right	none	123-456; A12-345	Issued in blocks by county	
	1971	As 1963 base, but with "71" at top right	none	123-456; A12-345	Issued in blocks by county	
	1972	As 1964 base, but with "72" at top right	none	123-456; A12-345	Issued in blocks by county	
	1973	As 1963 base, but with "73" at top right	none	123-456; A12-345	Issued in blocks by county	
	1974	As 1964 base, but with "74" at top right	none	123-456; A12-345	Issued in blocks by county	

=== 1975 to present ===
Image	Dates issued	Design	Slogan	Serial format	Serials issued	Notes
	1975–77	Embossed white serial on dark blue plate with border line; "19 KENTUCKY 75" at top; county name centered at bottom	none	ABC-123	Issued in blocks by county	Revalidated for 1976 and 1977 with stickers. Letters I, O, Q and U not used in serials; this practice continues today.
	1977–83	Embossed dark blue serial on white plate; "KY" at top left and top right; debossed box for expiration sticker centered at top; county-name sticker centered at bottom	none	ABC-123	AAA-000 to approximately GFZ-999	Monthly staggered registration introduced.
	1983–88	Embossed white serial on dark blue plate; "KENTUCKY" and county name centered at top and bottom respectively	none	ABC-123	JAA-000 to approximately RNV-999	
	1988–97	Embossed blue serial on white plate; twin spires of Churchill Downs racetrack screened in blue at the top and a mare and foal screened in light blue in the center; "Kentucky" screened in blue centered between spires; county name on blue sticker between state name and serial	"Bluegrass State" screened in blue centered at bottom	ABC 123	TAA 000 to ZZZ 999; AAA 000 to approximately EBP 999	Mare and foal based on the photo The Soul of a Horse, taken by Peter Thomann. The base was withdrawn when Thomann threatened to sue for copyright infringement.
	1997	Embossed blue serial on white plate; "KENTUCKY" and county name embossed in blue centered at top and bottom respectively	none	ABC-123	EBR-000 to approximately FAE-999	Interim plates based on truck plates of the time, with county name in place of weight class.
	January 1998 – November 2002	Embossed blue serial on graphic plate with light blue sky, white state-shaped cloud and green rolling hills; "Kentucky" screened in black centered at top; county name on green sticker in debossed box centered at bottom	"BLUEGRASS STATE" screened in black centered below state name	123 ABC	000 AAA to approximately 700 HYJ	
	November 2002 – January 2003	Embossed dark blue serial on white plate; "KENTUCKY" embossed in dark blue centered at top; county name on green sticker in debossed box centered at bottom	none	123 ABC	701 HYJ to 999 HZZ	Interim plates manufactured when stocks of cloud plates ran out before the smiling sun base (below) was introduced.
	January 2003 – July 31, 2005	Embossed dark blue serial on graphic plate with blue, white and red gradient sky, green rolling hills, and an anthropomorphic rising yellow sun with a red smile; "KENTUCKY" screened in white centered above serial; county name on green sticker in debossed box centered at bottom	"The Bluegrass State" and "It's that friendly." screened in blue above and below state name respectively	123 ABC	000 JAA to approximately 999 PSX	Awarded "Plate of the Year" for best new license plate of 2003 by the Automobile License Plate Collectors Association, the first and, to date, only time Kentucky has been so honored. Despite the honor, the plates were widely derided and defaced by residents.
	August 1, 2005 – June; 2008	Embossed dark blue serial on white and light blue gradient plate; state icon screened in the center; screened blue and red Kentucky Tourism logo centered above serial; county name on blue sticker in debossed box centered at bottom	"BLUEGRASS STATE" and "UNBRIDLED SPIRIT" screened above and below Kentucky Tourism logo respectively	123 ABC	000 AAA to approximately 900 JCB	
	June 2008 – late 2019	Embossed dark blue serial on white and light blue gradient plate; state icon screened in the center; screened blue and red Kentucky Tourism logo centered above serial; county name on blue sticker in debossed box centered at bottom	"BLUEGRASS STATE" and "UNBRIDLED SPIRIT" screened above and below Kentucky Tourism logo respectively	123 ABC	901 JCB to 999 ZZZ	Narrower serial dies. 'S' series not used in the 123 ABC format.
	late 2019 – September 2020	Embossed dark blue serial on white and light blue gradient plate; state icon screened in the center; screened blue and red Kentucky Tourism logo centered above serial; county name on blue sticker in debossed box centered at bottom	"BLUEGRASS STATE" and "UNBRIDLED SPIRIT" screened above and below Kentucky Tourism logo respectively	ABC 123	AAA 000 to ATE 999; BAA 000 to approximately BCD 999	Narrower serial dies. 'S' series not used in the 123 ABC format.
	January 2011 – September 2020	As above, but with smaller Kentucky Tourism logo	As above, plus "In God We Trust" screened in blue centered between logo and serial	123 ABC; ABC 123	Taken from standard allocation	No-cost alternative plate; first issues were in the LRG series of the 123 ABC format.
	September 2020 –August 2021	Flat, digitally printed dark blue serial on white and light blue gradient plate; state icon screened on the left; screened blue "KENTUCKY" centered above serial, with "BLUEGRASS STATE" screened above that in smaller font; county name on blue sticker in box centered at bottom; serial is not separated in middle, as with past designs		ABC123	ATF000 to AZZ999; BCE000 to approximately CBZ999	
	August 2021 – present	Flat, digitally printed dark blue serial on white and light blue gradient plate; state icon screened on the left; screened blue "KENTUCKY" centered above serial, with "BLUEGRASS STATE" screened above that in smaller font; county name on blue sticker in box centered at bottom; serial is not separated in middle, as with past designs		A1B234	A1A000 to Z3M065 (as of November 17, 2026)	
	September 2020 – Present	As above, but with county sticker box moved down slightly	As above, plus "IN GOD WE TRUST" screened in blue centered above county sticker	ABC123 A1B234	Taken from standard allocation	

== Special plates ==
Image	Type	Dates issued	Description	Serial format	Notes
"Nature's Finest"
	Nature's Finest – Viceroy butterfly	2004-2008, 2013-2025	Custom plate featuring a large viceroy butterfly on the left and a smaller one of the right. On the top is the familiar Kentucky Tourism logo and on the bottom are the words "Nature's Finest."	00 000, A0 000, 0000AA, A0A000	First run from 2004 to 2008, brought back in 2013 with a new serial format.
	Nature's Finest – Wren		12345		
	Nature's Finest - Cumberland Falls		Custom plate featuring the Cumberland Falls, a state park in Corbin, Kentucky. On the top is the familiar Kentucky Tourism logo and on the bottom are the words "Nature's Finest."		Discontinued
"Share The Road"
	Share The Road	2006-	Custom plate featuring two bicyclists and a runner on a blue background. A portion of proceeds goes to promote safety and education for both cyclists and pedestrians in the Commonwealth.	0000AA, A0A000	Flat printed beginning 2020

== Non-passenger plates ==
Image	Type	Dates issued	Design	Serial format	Serials issued	Notes
	Motorcycle	2003–09	Embossed dark blue serial on white plate; "KENTUCKY" and "MOTORCYCLE" centered at top and bottom respectively	1234A	0000A to 9999Z	
	Motorcycle	2009– present	Embossed dark blue serial on white plate; "KENTUCKY" and "MOTORCYCLE" centered at top and bottom respectively	AB123	AA000 to JV001 (as of October 23, 2020)	

== Government/Official plates ==
Image	Type	Design	Serial Format	Notes
	Official Government Units or Emergency Ambulances	Embossed black serial on white background. "Kentucky" screened at center top and "OFFICIAL" screen at center bottom. A black-and-white seal of the Commonwealth of Kentucky resides at the left side.	A1234	Local agencies may occasionally cover the Commonwealth seal with a sticker of their own organization's logo/seal.
	Congressional			
	Judiciary			
	State Senator			
	State Representative			
