= Vehicle registration plates of the United States for 1948 =

1948 license plates in the United States

Vehicle registration plates of the United States by year
| Vehicle registration plates of the United States for 1947 | Events of 1948 | Vehicle registration plates of the United States for 1949 |

Each of the 48 states of the United States of America plus several of its territories and the District of Columbia issued individual passenger license plates for 1948.

== Passenger baseplates ==
Passenger Car Plates
| Image | Region | Design | Slogan | Serial format | Serials issued | Notes |
|---|---|---|---|---|---|---|
| | Alabama | | | | | |
| | Alaska | | | | | |
| | American Samoa | | | | | |
| | Arizona | | | | | |
| | Arkansas | | | | | |
| | California | | | | | The 1947 California license plate is supplemented by a 1948 tab. |
| | Canal Zone | | | | | |
| | Colorado | | | | | |
| | Connecticut | | | | | |
| | Delaware | | | | | |
| | District of Columbia | | | | | |
| | Florida | | | | | |
| | Georgia | | | | | |
| | Guam | | | | | |
| | Hawai'i | | | | | |
| | Idaho | | | | | |
| | Illinois | | | | | |
| | Indiana | | | | | |
| | Iowa | | | | | |
| | Kansas | | | | | |
| | Kentucky | | | | | |
| | Louisiana | Embossed white serial with pelican separator on dark green plate with border line; "19 LOUISIANA 48" at top | none | 123 456 | 1-001 to 380-000; 400-001 to approximately 410-000 | |
| | Maine | | | | | |
| | Maryland | | | | | |
| | Massachusetts | | | | | |
| | Michigan | | | | | |
| | Minnesota | | | | | |
| | Mississippi | | | | | |
| | Missouri | | | | | |
| | Montana | | | | | |
| | Nebraska | | | | | |
| | Nevada | | | | | |
| | New Hampshire | | | | | |
| | New Jersey | | | | | |
| | New Mexico | | | | | |
| | New York | | | | | |
| | North Carolina | | | | | |
| | North Dakota | | | | | |
| | Northern Mariana; Islands | | | | | |
| | Ohio | | | | | |
| | Oklahoma | | | | | |
| | Oregon | | | | | |
| | Pennsylvania | | | | | |
| | Puerto Rico | | | | | |
| | Rhode Island | | | | | |
| | South Carolina | | | | | |
| | South Dakota | | | | | |
| | Tennessee | | | | | |
| | Texas | | | | | |
| | Utah | | | | | |
| | Vermont | | | | | |
| | Virginia | | | | | |
| | Washington | | | | | |
| | West Virginia | | | | | |
| | Wisconsin | Embossed white serial on black plate; "EXP. WISCONSIN 46" at top, slogan at bottom | AMERICA'S DAIRYLAND | 1/2 12345 | Coded by month of expiration (1/2) | Revalidated for 1948 with black on yellow tabs |
| | Wisconsin | Embossed white serial on black plate; "EXP. WISCONSIN 47" at top, slogan at bottom | AMERICA'S DAIRYLAND | 1/2 12345 | Coded by month of expiration (1/2) | Revalidated for 1948 with black on yellow tabs |
| | Wisconsin | Embossed white serial on black plate; "EXP. WISCONSIN" at top, slogan at bottom | AMERICA'S DAIRYLAND | 1/2 12345 | Coded by month of expiration (1/2) | Revalidated for 1948 with black on yellow tabs |
| | Wyoming | | | | | |

== Non-passenger plates ==
Non-passenger Plates
| Image (standard) | Region | Type | Design & Slogan | Serial format | Serials issued | Notes |
|---|---|---|---|---|---|---|
| | Wisconsin | Bus | Embossed black serial on white plate; "WIS" over "BUS" at top left, "47" over "48" at top right; quarterly tab at top center | 12 A | Coded by weight class (A) | |
| | Wisconsin | Cabin | Embossed yellow serial on black plate; "WIS. CABIN" at bottom, "EXP. - 6 - 1948" at top | 1234 | 1 to approximately 8500 | |
| | Wisconsin | Dealer | Embossed white serial on green plate; "19 WISCONSIN 48" at bottom, "DEALER" at top | A 1234 | Dealer number and plate number | Number is dealer number, letter is plate number for that dealer |
| | Wisconsin | Farm | Embossed white serial on brown plate; "WIS. FARM" at bottom, "EXP. - 6 - 1948" at top | 123456 | 1 to approximately 104999 | |
| | Wisconsin | In transit | Embossed white serial on green plate; "19 WISCONSIN 48" at bottom, "IN TRANSIT" at top | AB 12 | Transporter number and plate number | Number is the transporter number, letters increment every time a new plate is issued to that specific transporter |
| | Wisconsin | Manufacturer | Embossed white serial on green plate; "19 WISCONSIN 48" at bottom, "MANUFACTURER" at top | AB 12 | Dealer number and plate number | Number is the manufacturer number, letters increment every time a new plate is issued to that specific manufacturer |
| | Wisconsin | Motorcycle | Embossed white serial on green plate with border line; "A WIS 48" at top | 12345 | 1 to approximately 11000 | |
| | Wisconsin | Motorcycle sidecar | Embossed white serial on green plate with border line; "B WIS 48" at top | 123 | 1 to approximately 175 | |
| | Wisconsin | Motorcycle dealer | Embossed white serial on green plate with border line; "WIS 1948" at top, vertical stacked "DLR" at right | AB1, A12 | Dealer number and plate number | Number is the dealer number, letters increment every time a new plate is issued to that specific dealer |
| | Wisconsin | Municipal | Embossed green serial on white plate; "19 WISCONSIN 48" at bottom, "OFFICIAL" at top; hollow green diamond at right | 12345 | 1 to approximately 10500 | Motorcycle version also available |
| | Wisconsin | Municipal motorcycle | Embossed green serial on white plate with border line; unknown format | | | |
| | Wisconsin | Official | Embossed green serial on white plate; "19 WISCONSIN 48" at bottom, "OFFICIAL" at top; hollow green star at right | 123 | 1 to unknown | Motorcycle version also available |
| | Wisconsin | School bus | Embossed yellow serial on black plate; "WIS" over "SCH" at top left, "47" over "48" at top right; quarterly tab at top center | 12 A | Coded by weight class (A) | |
| | Wisconsin | Light private trailer | Embossed yellow serial on black plate; "WIS. TRAILER" at bottom, "EXP. - 6 - 1948" at top | 1234 A | Coded by weight class (A) | Weight classes are A, B, C, and D. |
| | Wisconsin | Limited trailer | Embossed yellow serial on black plate; "WIS. TRAILER" at bottom, "EXP. - 6 - 1948" at top; "LTD." over "2MI." at left | 123 | 1 to unknown (55 listed in plate guide) | Used on trailers hauled 2 miles or less from "loading platform or freight station" |
| | Wisconsin | Heavy trailer | Embossed black serial on white plate; "WIS" over "TLR" at top left, "47" over "48" at top right; quarterly tab at top center | 123 A | Coded by weight class (A) | Issued to all commercial trailers, and private trailers over 8,000lbs. Weight classes are A, B, C, D, E, F, G, H, J, K, L, M, N, R, S, T, V, and X for commercial trailers, and private trailers use the E weight class and above |
| | Wisconsin | Light truck | Embossed yellow serial on black plate; "WIS. TRUCK" at bottom, "EXP. - 6 - 1948" at top | 12345 A | Coded by weight class (A) | Weight classes are A, B, C, and D. |
| | Wisconsin | Heavy truck | Embossed black serial on white plate; "WIS" over "TRK" at top left, "47" over "48" at top right; quarterly tab at top center | 12345A | Coded by weight class (A) | Weight classes are E, F, G, H, J, K, L, M, N, R, S, T, V, and X. Also issued to light trucks for hire in the A, B, C, and D weight classes. |

== See also ==
- Antique vehicle registration
- Electronic license plate
- Motor vehicle registration
- Vehicle license
