= Vehicle registration plates of the United States for 1951 =

1951 license plates in the United States

Vehicle registration plates of the United States by year
Vehicle registration plates of the United States for 1950	Events of 1951	Vehicle registration plates of the United States for 1952

Each of the 48 states of the United States of America plus several of its territories and the District of Columbia issued individual passenger license plates for 1951.

== Passenger baseplates ==
Passenger Car Plates
Image	Region	Design	Slogan	Serial format	Serials issued	Notes
	Alabama					
	Alaska					
	American Samoa					
	Arizona					
	Arkansas					
	California					
	Canal Zone					
	Colorado					
	Connecticut					
	Delaware					
	District of Columbia					
	Florida	Embossed dark green serial on yellow plate with border line; "FLORIDA" centered at bottom; "19" at bottom left and "51" at bottom right	"KEEP FLORIDA GREEN" centered at top	1T-1234; 10T-123; 1D-1234; 10D-123; 1-123456; 10-12345; 1W12345; 10W12345; 1WW-123; 10WW123	Coded by county of issuance (1 or 10) and weight class	Plates with eight-character serials (counting the dash, if present) were an inch longer than plates with serials of seven characters or less. This practice continued through 1955.
	Georgia					
	Guam					
	Hawai'i					
	Idaho	white on maroon				
	Illinois	dark red on white				
	Indiana					
	Iowa					
	Kansas					
	Kentucky					
	Louisiana					
	Maine					
	Maryland					
	Massachusetts					
	Michigan					
	Minnesota	10,000 Lakes				
	Mississippi					
	Missouri					
	Montana					
	Nebraska					
	Nevada					
	New Hampshire					
	New Jersey					
	New Mexico					
	New York					
	North Carolina					
	North Dakota					
	Northern Mariana; Islands					
	Ohio					
	Oklahoma					
	Oregon					
	Pennsylvania					
	Puerto Rico					
	Rhode Island					
	South Carolina					
	South Dakota					
	Tennessee	white on orange state-shaped plate				
	Texas	black on orange				
	Utah					
	Vermont					
	Virginia					
	Washington					
	West Virginia					
	Wisconsin	Embossed white serial on black plate; "EXP. WISCONSIN 46" at top, slogan at bottom	AMERICA'S DAIRYLAND	1/2 12345	Coded by month of expiration (1/2)	Revalidated for 1951 with red on white tabs
	Wisconsin	Embossed white serial on black plate; "EXP. WISCONSIN 47" at top, slogan at bottom	AMERICA'S DAIRYLAND	1/2 12345	Coded by month of expiration (1/2)	Revalidated for 1951 with red on white tabs
	Wisconsin	Embossed white serial on black plate; "EXP. WISCONSIN" at top, slogan at bottom	AMERICA'S DAIRYLAND	1/2 12345	Coded by month of expiration (1/2)	Revalidated for 1951 with red on white tabs
	Wisconsin	Embossed white serial on black plate; "EXP WISCONSIN" at top, slogan at bottom	AMERICA'S DAIRYLAND	1/2 123-456	Coded by month of expiration (1/2)	Revalidated for 1951 with red on white tabs
	Wyoming					

== Non-passenger plates ==
Non-passenger Plates
Image (standard)	Region	Type	Design & Slogan	Serial format	Serials issued	Notes
	Wisconsin	Bus	Embossed white serial on green plate; "WIS" at top left, "BUS" at top right; "50" at bottom left, "51" at bottom right	A 12	Coded by weight class (A)	
	Wisconsin	Cabin	Embossed white serial on red plate; "WIS CABIN" at bottom, "EXP 6 1951" at top	1234	1 to approximately 7000	
	Wisconsin	Dealer	Embossed black serial on golden yellow plate; "19 WISCONSIN 51" at bottom, "DEALER" at top	A 1234	Dealer number and plate number	Number is the dealer number, letters increment every time a new plate is issued to that specific dealer
	Wisconsin	Disabled veteran	Unknown format			
	Wisconsin	Farm	Embossed white serial on gray plate; "WIS FARM" at bottom, "EXP 6 1951" at top	12345	1 to approximately 91000	
	Wisconsin	In transit	Embossed black serial on golden yellow plate; "19 WISCONSIN 51" at bottom, "IN TRANSIT" at top	AB 12	Distributor number and plate number	Number is the distributor number, letters increment every time a new plate is issued to that specific distributor
	Wisconsin	Manufacturer	Embossed black serial on golden yellow plate; "19 WISCONSIN 51" at bottom, "MANUFACTURER" at top	AB 12	Manufacturer number and plate number	Number is the manufacturer number, letters increment every time a new plate is issued to that specific manufacturer
	Wisconsin	Motorcycle	Embossed black serial on yellow plate with border line; "A WIS 51" at top	1234	1 to approximately 9000	
	Wisconsin	Sidecar motorcycle	Embossed black serial on yellow plate with border line; "B WIS 51" at top	123	1 to approximately 150	
	Wisconsin	Municipal	Embossed black serial on golden yellow plate; "19 WISCONSIN 51" at bottom, "MUNICIPAL" at top	12345	1 to approximately 12500	Motorcycle version also available
	Wisconsin	Official	Embossed black serial on golden yellow plate; "19 WISCONSIN 51" at bottom, "OFFICIAL" at top	123	1 to approximately 700	
	Wisconsin	School bus	Embossed white serial on black plate; "WIS" at top left, "SCH" at top right; "50" at bottom left, "51" at bottom right	A 12	Coded by weight class (A)	
	Wisconsin	Light private trailer	Embossed white serial on red plate; "WIS TRAILER" at bottom, "EXP 6 1951" at top	A1234	Coded by weight class (A)	
	Wisconsin	Heavy Trailer	Embossed white serial on green plate; "WIS" at top left, "TRL" at top right; "50" at bottom left, "51" at bottom right	A 123	Coded by weight class (A)	Issued to all commercial trailers, and private trailers over 8,000lbs. Weight classes are A, B, C, D, E, F, G, H, J, K, L, M, N, R, S, T, V, and X for commercial trailers, and private trailers use the E weight class and above.
	Wisconsin	Light truck	Embossed white serial on red plate; "WIS TRUCK" at bottom, "EXP 6 1951" at top	A 12345	Coded by weight class (A)	Weight classes are A, B, C, and D.
	Wisconsin	Heavy truck	Embossed white serial on green plate; "WIS" at top left, "TRK" at top right; "50" at bottom left, "51" at bottom right	A12345	Coded by weight class (A)	Weight classes are E, F, G, H, J, K, L, M, N, R, S, T, V, and X. Also issued to light trucks for hire in the A, B, C, and D weight classes

== See also ==
- Antique vehicle registration
- Electronic license plate
- Motor vehicle registration
- Vehicle license
