= Vehicle registration plates of the United States for 1945 =

1945 license plates in the United States

Vehicle registration plates of the United States by year
Vehicle registration plates of the United States for 1944	Events of 1945	Vehicle registration plates of the United States for 1946

Each of the 48 states of the United States of America plus several of its territories and the District of Columbia issued individual passenger license plates for 1945.

== Passenger baseplates ==
Passenger Car Plates
Image	Region	Design	Slogan	Serial format	Serials issued	Notes
	Alabama					
	Alaska					
	American Samoa					
	Arizona					
	Arkansas					
	California					
	Canal Zone					
	Colorado					
	Connecticut					
	Delaware					
	District of Columbia					
	Florida					
	Georgia					
	Guam					
	Hawai'i					
	Idaho					
	Illinois					
	Indiana					
	Iowa	Embossed black serial and border line on white plate; "IOWA-1945" centered at top	none	1-23456 and 12-34567	County coded	Only rear plates issued
	Kansas					
	Kentucky					
	Louisiana					
	Maine	Embossed dark blue serial and border line on white plate; "MAINE 1945" centered at top	"VACATIONLAND" centered at bottom	123-456	1 to approximately 155-000	
	Maryland					
	Massachusetts					
	Michigan					
	Minnesota					
	Mississippi					
	Missouri					
	Montana					
	Nebraska					
	Nevada					
	New Hampshire					
	New Jersey					
	New Mexico					
	New York					
	North Carolina					
	North Dakota					
	Northern Mariana; Islands					
	Ohio					
	Oklahoma					
	Oregon					The 1942 plates continued in use and were validated by a windshield sticker for 1945.
	Pennsylvania					
	Puerto Rico					
	Rhode Island					
	South Carolina					
	South Dakota					
	Tennessee					
	Texas					
	Utah					
	Vermont					
	Virginia					
	Washington					
	West Virginia					
	Wisconsin	Embossed golden yellow serial on black plate; "19 WISCONSIN 42" at bottom, slogan at top	AMERICA'S DAIRYLAND	123 456	1 to approximately 775 000	Revalidated for 1945 with red on white tabs.
	Wisconsin	Embossed golden yellow serial on black plate with border line; "WIS" embossed at bottom left, yellow oval with debossed "1942" at bottom right	none	A12, A1B, AB1, ABC, 12A, 1A2, 1AB	A00 to 9ZZ	Revalidated for 1945 with red on white tabs.
	Wisconsin	Embossed golden yellow serial on black plate with border line; "WIS" embossed at bottom left, white oval with debossed "43" at bottom right	none	A123, 1A23	A000 to 9K99	Revalidated for 1945 with red on white tabs.
	Wyoming					

== Non-passenger plates ==
Non-passenger Plates
Image (standard)	Region	Type	Design & Slogan	Serial format	Serials issued	Notes
	Wisconsin	Bus	Embossed yellow serial on black plate with border line; "WIS" over "BUS" at top left, "44" over "45" at top right; quarterly tab at top center	A 12	Coded by weight class	
	Wisconsin	Cabin	Embossed black serial on orange plate with border line; "CABIN" at bottom left, vertical "WIS" at left; black oval with debossed "42-43" at bottom right	123	1 to approximately 950	Revalidated for 1945 with white on red tabs
	Wisconsin	Dealer	Embossed white serial on green plate with border line; "DEALER" at top left, vertical "WIS" at left; white oval with debossed "1944" at top right	A1234	Dealer number and plate number	Number is dealer number, letter is plate number for that dealer. Revalidated for 1945 with black on yellow tabs.
	Wisconsin	Farm	Embossed black serial on white plate with border line; "FARM" at top left, vertical "WIS" at left; black oval with debossed "42-43" at top right	12345	1 to approximately 65000	Revalidated for 1945 with white on red tabs
	Wisconsin	Motorcycle	Embossed black serial on yellow plate with border line; "WIS" at top left, black oval with debossed "1943" at top right	1234	1 to approximately 5200	Revalidated for 1945 with red on white tabs.
	Wisconsin	Municipal	Unknown design			
	Wisconsin	Official	Unknown design			
	Wisconsin	Light private trailer	Embossed black serial on gray plate with border line; "44 WIS TRAILER 45" at top, "NOT FOR HIRE" at bottom	A1 234	Coded by weight class	Weight classes are A, B, C, and D.
	Wisconsin	Limited trailer	Unknown design			Used on trailers hauled 2 miles or less from "loading platform or freight station"
	Wisconsin	Heavy trailer	Embossed yellow serial on black plate with border line; "WIS" over "T-L" at top left, "44" over "45" at top right; quarterly tab at top center	A 12	Coded by weight class	Issued to all commercial trailers, and all private trailers over 8,000lbs. Weight classes are A, B, C, D, E, F, G, H, J, K, L, M, and N for commercial trailers, and private trailers use the E weight class and above.
	Wisconsin	Light truck	Embossed black serial on gray plate with border line; "44 WIS TRUCK 45" at top, "NOT FOR HIRE" at bottom	A12 345	Coded by weight class	Weight classes are A, B, C, and D.
	Wisconsin	Heavy truck	Embossed yellow serial on black plate with border line; "WIS" over "TRK" at top left, "44" over "45" at top right; quarterly tab at top center	A12345	Coded by weight class	Weight classes are E, F, G, H, J, K, L, M, and N. These plates were also issued to light trucks for hire in the A, B, C, and D weight classes.

== See also ==
- Antique vehicle registration
- Electronic license plate
- Motor vehicle registration
- Vehicle license
