= Vehicle registration plates of the United States for 1950 =

1950 license plates in the United States

Vehicle registration plates of the United States by year
| Vehicle registration plates of the United States for 1949 | Events of 1950 | Vehicle registration plates of the United States for 1951 |

Each of the 48 states of the United States of America plus several of its territories and the District of Columbia issued individual passenger license plates for 1950.

== Passenger baseplates ==
Passenger Car Plates
| Image | Region | Design | Slogan | Serial format | Serials issued | Notes |
|---|---|---|---|---|---|---|
| | Alabama | | | | | |
| | Alaska | | | | | |
| | American Samoa | | | | | |
| | Arizona | | | | | |
| | Arkansas | | | | | |
| | California | | | | | The 1947 license plate is supplemented by a 1950 tab. |
| | Canal Zone | | | | | |
| | Colorado | | | | | |
| | Connecticut | | | | | |
| | Delaware | | | | | |
| | District of Columbia | | | | | |
| | Florida | | | | | |
| | Georgia | | | | | |
| | Guam | | | | | |
| | Hawai'i | | | | | |
| | Idaho | | | | | |
| | Illinois | | | | | |
| | Indiana | | | | | |
| | Iowa | | | | | |
| | Kansas | | | | | |
| | Kentucky | | | | | |
| | Louisiana | | | | | |
| | Maine | | | | | |
| | Maryland | | | | | |
| | Massachusetts | | | | | |
| | Michigan | | | | | |
| | Minnesota | | | | | |
| | Mississippi | | | | | |
| | Missouri | | | | | |
| | Montana | | | | | |
| | Nebraska | | | | | |
| | Nevada | | | | | |
| | New Hampshire | | | | | |
| | New Jersey | | | | | |
| | New Mexico | | | | | |
| | New York | | | | | |
| | North Carolina | | | | | |
| | North Dakota | | | | | |
| | Northern Mariana; Islands | | | | | |
| | Ohio | | | | | |
| | Oklahoma | | | | | |
| | Oregon | | | | | |
| | Pennsylvania | | | | | |
| | Puerto Rico | | | | | |
| | Rhode Island | | | | | |
| | South Carolina | | | | | |
| | South Dakota | | | | | |
| | Tennessee | | | | | |
| | Texas | | | | | |
| | Utah | | | | | |
| | Vermont | | | | | |
| | Virginia | | | | | |
| | Washington | | | | | |
| | West Virginia | | | | | |
| | Wisconsin | Embossed white serial on black plate; "EXP. WISCONSIN 46" at top, slogan at bottom | AMERICA'S DAIRYLAND | 1/2 12345 | Coded by month of expiration (1/2) | Revalidated to 1950 with yellow on light blue tabs |
| | Wisconsin | Embossed white serial on black plate; "EXP. WISCONSIN 47" at top, slogan at bottom | AMERICA'S DAIRYLAND | 1/2 12345 | Coded by month of expiration (1/2) | Revalidated to 1950 with yellow on light blue tabs |
| | Wisconsin | Embossed white serial on black plate; "EXP. WISCONSIN" at top, slogan at bottom | AMERICA'S DAIRYLAND | 1/2 12345 | Coded by month of expiration (1/2) | Revalidated to 1950 with yellow on light blue tabs |
| | Wisconsin | Embossed white serial on black plate; "EXP WISCONSIN" at top, slogan at bottom | AMERICA'S DAIRYLAND | 1/2 123-456 | Coded by month of expiration (1/2) | Revalidated to 1950 with yellow on light blue tabs |
| | Wyoming | | | | | |

== Non-passenger plates ==
Non-passenger Plates
| Image (standard) | Region | Type | Design & Slogan | Serial format | Serials issued | Notes |
|---|---|---|---|---|---|---|
| | California | Commercial | Black serial on orange background | A 12 34; A/B 12 34 | | |
| | Wisconsin | Bus | Embossed orange serial on black plate; "WIS" over "BUS" at top left, "49" over "50" at top right; quarterly tab at top center | A 12 | Coded by weight class (A) | |
| | Wisconsin | Cabin | Embossed yellow serial on black plate; "WIS. CABIN" at bottom, "EXP. - 6 - 1948" at top | 1234 | 1 to approximately 8500 | Revalidated to 1950 with black on gray tabs. |
| | Wisconsin | Dealer | Embossed white serial on black plate; "19 WISCONSIN 50" at bottom, "DEALER" at top | A 1234 | Dealer number and plate number | Number is the dealer number, letters increment every time a new plate is issued to that specific dealer |
| | Wisconsin | Disabled veteran | Embossed black serial on red plate; "DISABLED-VETERAN" at bottom, "EXP WISCONSIN" at top | 1 DV123 | Unknown | |
| | Wisconsin | Farm | Embossed white serial on brown plate; "WIS. FARM" at bottom, "EXP. - 6 - 1948" at top | 123456 | 1 to approximately 104999 | Revalidated for 1950 with black on yellow tabs |
| | Wisconsin | Farm | Embossed white serial on brown plate; "WIS FARM" at bottom, "EXP 6 1950" at top | 123456 | 105000 to approximately 106500 | Late variation |
| | Wisconsin | In transit | Embossed white serial on black plate; "19 WISCONSIN 50" at bottom, "IN TRANSIT" at top | AB 12 | Transporter number and plate number | Number is the transporter number, letters increment every time a new plate is issued to that specific transporter |
| | Wisconsin | Manufacturer | Embossed white serial on black plate; "19 WISCONSIN 50" at bottom, "MANUFACTURER" at top | AB 12 | Manufacturer number and plate number | Number is the manufacturer number, letters increment every time a new plate is issued to that specific manufacturer |
| | Wisconsin | Motorcycle | Embossed white serial on black plate; "A WIS 50" at top | 1234 | 1 to approximately 9500 | |
| | Wisconsin | Motorcycle sidecar | Embossed white serial on black plate; "B WIS 50" at top | 123 | 1 to approximately 100 | |
| | Wisconsin | Municipal | Embossed white serial on black plate; "19 WISCONSIN 50" at bottom, "MUNICIPAL" at top | 1234 | 1 to approximately 12600 | Motorcycle version also available |
| | Wisconsin | Official | Embossed white serial on black plate; unknown format | 123 | 1 to unknown (53 high) | |
| | Wisconsin | School bus | Embossed orange serial on green plate; "WIS" over "SCH" at top left, "49" over "50" at top right; quarterly tab at top center | A 12 | Coded by weight class (A) | |
| | Wisconsin | Light private trailer | Embossed yellow serial on black plate; "WIS. TRAILER" at bottom, "EXP. - 6 - 1948" at top | 1234 A | Coded by weight class (A) | Revalidated for 1950 with unknown color tabs. Weight classes are A, B, C, and D. |
| | Wisconsin | Heavy Trailer | Embossed orange serial on black plate; "WIS" over "TLR" at top left, "49" over "50" at top right; quarterly tab at top center | A 123 | Coded by weight class (A) | Issued to all commercial trailers, and private trailers over 8,000lbs. Weight classes are A, B, C, D, E, F, G, H, J, K, L, M, N, R, S, T, V, and X for commercial trailers, and private trailers use the E weight class and above |
| | Wisconsin | Light truck | Embossed yellow serial on black plate; "WIS. TRUCK" at bottom, "EXP. - 6 - 1948" at top | 12345A | Coded by weight class (A) | Revalidated for 1950 with black on orange tabs. Weight classes are A, B, C, and D. |
| | Wisconsin | Heavy truck | Embossed orange serial on black plate; "WIS" over "TRK" at top left, "49" over "50" at top right; quarterly tab at top center | A12345 | Coded by weight class (A) | Weight classes are E, F, G, H, J, K, L, M, N, R, S, T, V, and X. Also issued to light trucks for hire in the A, B, C, and D weight classes. |

== See also ==
- Antique vehicle registration
- Electronic license plate
- Motor vehicle registration
- Vehicle license
