= Vehicle registration plates of the United States for 1947 =

1947 license plates in the United States

Vehicle registration plates of the United States by year
Vehicle registration plates of the United States for 1946	Events of 1947	Vehicle registration plates of the United States for 1948

Each of the 48 states of the United States of America plus several of its territories and the District of Columbia issued individual passenger license plates for 1947.

== Passenger baseplates ==
Passenger Car Plates
Image	Region	Design	Slogan	Serial format	Serials issued	Notes
	Alabama					
	Alaska					
	American Samoa					
	Arizona					
	Arkansas					
	California					
	Canal Zone					
	Colorado					
	Connecticut					
	Delaware					
	District of Columbia					
	Florida					
	Georgia					
	Guam					
	Hawai'i					
	Idaho					
	Illinois					
	Indiana					
	Iowa					
	Kansas					
	Kentucky					
	Louisiana					
	Maine					
	Maryland					
	Massachusetts					
	Michigan					
	Minnesota					
	Mississippi					
	Missouri					
	Montana					
	Nebraska					
	Nevada					
	New Hampshire					
	New Jersey					
	New Mexico					
	New York					
	North Carolina					
	North Dakota					
	Northern Mariana; Islands					
	Ohio					
	Oklahoma					
	Oregon					Oregon returned to issuing pairs of plates.
	Pennsylvania					
	Puerto Rico					
	Rhode Island					
	South Carolina					
	South Dakota					
	Tennessee					
	Texas					
	Utah					
	Vermont					
	Virginia					
	Washington					
	West Virginia					
	Wisconsin	Embossed white serial on black plate; "EXP. WISCONSIN 46" at top, slogan at bottom	AMERICA'S DAIRYLAND	1/2 12345	Coded by month of expiration (1/2)	Revalidated for 1947 with black on dark orange tabs
	Wisconsin	Embossed white serial on black plate; "EXP. WISCONSIN 47" at top, slogan at bottom	AMERICA'S DAIRYLAND	1/2 12345	Coded by month of expiration (1/2)	
	Wyoming					

== Non-passenger plates ==
Non-passenger Plates
Image (standard)	Region	Type	Design & Slogan	Serial format	Serials issued	Notes
	Indiana	Truck	Embossed black serial on golden yellow plate; "INDIANA" at top, "47" at bottom	T123 456, T 123456	T 1 to approximately T 190000	
	Wisconsin	Bus	Embossed black serial on yellow plate with border line; "WIS" over "BUS" at top left, "45" over "46" at top right; quarterly tab at top center	A 12	Coded by weight class (A)	Revalidated for 1947 with white on black tabs in addition to quarterly tabs
	Wisconsin	Cabin	Embossed red serial on gray plate with border line; "CABIN" at top left, vertical "WIS" at left; red oval with debossed "45-6" at top right	1234	1 to approximately 2500	Revalidated to 1947 with white on black tabs
	Wisconsin	Dealer	Embossed white serial on brown plate; "19 WISCONSIN 47" at bottom, "DEALER" at top	1234 A	Dealer number and plate number	Number is dealer number, letter is plate number for that dealer
	Wisconsin	Farm	Embossed black serial on orange plate with border line; "FARM" at top left, vertical "WIS" at left; black oval with debossed "45-6" at top right	12345	1 to approximately 70000	Revalidated for 1947 with white on black tabs
	Wisconsin	In transit	Embossed white serial on brown plate; "19 WISCONSIN 47" at bottom, "IN TRANSIT" at top	12 AB	Distributor number and plate number	Number is distributor number, letters are incremented every time a new plate is issued to that specific distributor
	Wisconsin	Manufacturer	Embossed white serial on brown plate; "19 WISCONSIN 47" at bottom, "MANUFACTURER" at top	12 A	Dealer number and plate number	Number is the manufacturer number, letters are incremented every time a new plate is issued to that specific manufacturer
	Wisconsin	Motorcycle	Embossed white serial on brown plate; "A WIS 47" at bottom	1234	1 to approximately 8000	
	Wisconsin	Motorcycle sidecar	Embossed white serial on brown plate; "B WIS 47" at bottom	123	1 to approximately 150	
	Wisconsin	Municipal	Embossed white serial on green plate; "19 WISCONSIN 47" at bottom, "OFFICIAL" at top; hollow white diamond at left	12345	1 to approximately 10500	Motorcycle version also available
	Wisconsin	Official	Embossed white serial on green plate; "19 WISCONSIN 47" at bottom, "OFFICIAL" at top; hollow white star at left	123	1 to unknown	Motorcycle version also available
	Wisconsin	School bus	Embossed red serial on white plate with border line; vertical stacked "SCHOOL" at left, vertical stacked "BUS WIS" to the right of the stacked "SCHOOL"; "45" over "46" at top right, quarterly tab at top center	A 12	Coded by weight class (A)	Revalidated for 1947 with unknown color tabs
	Wisconsin	Light private trailer	Embossed red serial on white plate with border line; "45 WIS TRAILER 46" at top	A1 234	Coded by weight class (A)	Revalidated for 1947 with white on black tabs. Weight classes are A, B, C, and D.
	Wisconsin	Limited trailer	Unknown design	LTD 123	Unknown to LTD 108	Used on trailers hauled 2 miles or less from "loading platform or freight station"
	Wisconsin	Heavy trailer	Embossed black serial on yellow plate with border line; "WIS" over "T-L" at top left, "45" over "46" at top right; quarterly tab at top center	A 123	Coded by weight class (A)	Revalidated for 1947 with white on black tabs in addition to quarterly tabs. Issued to all commercial trailers, and private trailers over 8,000lbs. Weight classes are A, B, C, D, E, F, G, H, J, K, L, M, N, R, S, T, V, and X for commercial trailers, and private trailers use the E weight class and above.
	Wisconsin	Light truck	Embossed red serial on white plate with border line; "45 WIS TRUCK 46" at top	A12 345	Coded by weight class (A)	Weight classes are A, B, C, and D.
	Wisconsin	Heavy truck	Embossed black serial on yellow plate with border line; "WIS" over "TRK" at top left, "45" over "46" at top right; quarterly tab at top center	A12345	Coded by weight class (A)	Revalidated for 1947 with white on black tabs in addition to quarterly tabs. Weight classes are E, F, G, H, J, K, L, M, N, R, S, T, V, and X. Also issued to light trucks for hire in the A, B, C, and D weight classes.

== See also ==
- Antique vehicle registration
- Electronic license plate
- Motor vehicle registration
- Vehicle license
