= Vehicle registration plates of the United States for 1946 =

1946 license plates in the United States

Vehicle registration plates of the United States by year
Vehicle registration plates of the United States for 1945	Events of 1946	Vehicle registration plates of the United States for 1947

Each of the 48 states of the United States of America plus several of its territories and the District of Columbia issued individual passenger license plates for 1946.

== Passenger baseplates ==
Passenger Car Plates
Image	Region	Design	Slogan	Serial format	Serials issued	Notes
	Alabama					
	Alaska					
	American Samoa					
	Arizona					
	Arkansas					
	California					The 1945 license plate is validated by a 1946 tab.
	Canal Zone					
	Colorado					
	Connecticut					
	Delaware					
	District of Columbia					
	Florida					
	Georgia					
	Guam					
	Hawai'i					
	Idaho					
	Illinois					
	Indiana					
	Iowa					
	Kansas					
	Kentucky					
	Louisiana					
	Maine	Embossed white letters and border on navy blue plate. "MAINE 1946" embossed at top; "VACATIONLAND" at bottom.	"VACATIONLAND" embossed at bottom.	1-234; 12-345	unknown	
	Maryland					
	Massachusetts					
	Michigan					
	Minnesota					
	Mississippi					
	Missouri					
	Montana					
	Nebraska					
	Nevada					
	New Hampshire					
	New Jersey	Embossed black serial on straw-colored plate; "N.J. '46" centered at top	none	A/B123; A/B12A	County-coded (A/B)	
	New Mexico					
	New York					
	North Carolina					
	North Dakota					
	Northern Mariana; Islands					
	Ohio					
	Oklahoma					
	Oregon					Only a rear plate was issued along with a windshield sticker in lieu of a front plate.
	Pennsylvania					
	Puerto Rico					
	Rhode Island					
	South Carolina					
	South Dakota					
	Tennessee					
	Texas					
	Utah	White on black with border line; "46 UTAH" at left	CENTER SCENIC AMERICA	A1234		
	Vermont					
	Virginia					
	Washington					
	West Virginia					
	Wisconsin	Embossed white serial on black plate; "EXP. WISCONSIN 46" at top, slogan at bottom	AMERICA'S DAIRYLAND	1/2 34567	Coded by month of expiration (1/2)	
	Wyoming					

== Non-passenger plates ==
Non-passenger Plates
Image (standard)	Region	Type	Design & Slogan	Serial format	Serials issued	Notes
	Wisconsin	Bus	Embossed black serial on yellow plate with border line; "WIS" over "BUS" at top left, "45" over "46" at top right; quarterly tab at top center	A 12	Coded by weight class (A)	
	Wisconsin	Cabin	Embossed red serial on gray plate with border line; "CABIN" at top left, vertical "WIS" at left; red oval with debossed "45-6" at top right	1234	1 to approximately 2500	
	Wisconsin	Dealer	Embossed white serial on black plate with border line; "WIS.DLR." at top left, white oval with debossed "1946" at top right	A 1234	Dealer number and plate number	Number is dealer number, letter is plate number for that dealer
	Wisconsin	Farm	Embossed black serial on orange plate with border line; "FARM" at top left, vertical "WIS" at left; black oval with debossed "45-6" at top right	12345	1 to approximately 75000	
	Wisconsin	In transit	Unknown design			
	Wisconsin	Motorcycle	Embossed white serial on black plate with border line; "WIS" at top right, white oval with debossed "1946" at top left	1234	1 to approximately 5300	
	Wisconsin	Motorcycle dealer	Embossed white serial on black plate with border line; unknown format			
	Wisconsin	Municipal	Embossed white serial on black plate with border line; "WIS" at top left, white oval with debossed "1946" at top right; white hollow diamond at right	1234	1 to approximately 9200	Motorcycle version also available
	Wisconsin	Municipal motorcycle	Embossed white serial on black plate with border line; unknown format	12	1 to unknown	
	Wisconsin	Official	Embossed white serial on black plate with border line; "WIS" at top left, white oval with debossed "1946" at top right; white hollow star at right	123	1 to unknown (266 high)	
	Wisconsin	Official motorcycle	Embossed white serial on black plate with border line; unknown format	12	1 to unknown	
	Wisconsin	School bus	Embossed red serial on white plate with border line; vertical stacked "SCHOOL" at left, vertical stacked "BUS WIS" to the right of the "SCHOOL" caption; "45" over "46" at top right, quarterly tab at top center	A 12	Coded by weight class (A)	
	Wisconsin	Light private trailer	Embossed red serial on white plate with border line; "45 WIS TRAILER 46" at top	A1 234	Coded by weight class (A)	Weight classes are A, B, C, and D.
	Wisconsin	Limited trailer	Unknown design			
	Wisconsin	Heavy trailer	Embossed black serial on yellow plate with border line; "WIS" over "T-L" at top left, "45" over "46" at top right; quarterly tab at top center	A 123	Coded by weight class (A)	Issued to all commercial trailers, and private trailers over 8,000lbs. Weight classes are A, B, C, D, E, F, G, H, J, K, L, M, and N for commercial trailers, and private trailers use the E weight class and above.
	Wisconsin	Light truck	Embossed red serial on white plate with border line; "45 WIS TRUCK 46" at top	A12 345	Coded by weight class (A)	Weight classes are A, B, C, and D.
	Wisconsin	Heavy truck	Embossed black serial on yellow plate with border line; "WIS" over "TRK" at top left, "45" over "46" at top right; quarterly tab at top center	A12345	Coded by weight class (A)	Weight classes are E, F, G, H, J, K, L, M, and N. Light trucks for hire also were issued these plates in the A, B, C, and D weight classes.

== See also ==
- Antique vehicle registration
- Electronic license plate
- Motor vehicle registration
- Vehicle license
