= Vehicle registration plates of the United States for 1949 =

1949 license plates in the United States

Vehicle registration plates of the United States by year
Vehicle registration plates of the United States for 1948	Events of 1949	Vehicle registration plates of the United States for 1950

All of the 48 states of the United States of America plus several of its territories and the District of Columbia issued individual passenger license plates for the year 1949.

== Passenger baseplates ==
Passenger Car Plates
Image	Region	Design	Slogan	Serial format	Serials issued	Notes
	Alabama					
	Alaska					
	Arizona	Embossed green serial on waffle-textured unpainted aluminum plate; "ARIZONA 49" centered at top	"GRAND CANYON STATE" centered at bottom	A-12345		County Code used the letter to issued plates. 14 AZ Counties, a couple that fallow A - Maricopa & C - Pima.
	Arkansas					
	California		none			The 1947 license plate is supplemented by a 1949 tab.
	Canal Zone	Embossed off-white on blue	none	12345		
	Colorado	Embossed yellow lettering and rims on black base. "19 COLORADO 49" at bottom.	none	1-12345; 10–12345		County-coded registration.
	Connecticut					
	Delaware			123456		
	District of Columbia					
	Florida			1D-12345; 10D12345; 1-123456; 10-123456; 1W123456; 10W12345; 1WW12345; 10WW1234		Coded by county (1 or 10) and weight class
	Georgia	Embossed red numbers and border on unpainted aluminum base.	"Peach State"	1·12345; 1·A·12345; 10·1234; 10·A·1234; 100·1234; 100·A·123		Coded by county of issuance (1, 10 or 100) and weight class
	Guam			1234		
	Hawai'i					
	Idaho					Coded by county of issuance
	Illinois	Yellow lettering on back base; "ILLINOIS 1949" at top.		123 456; 123 4567		All-numerical serials.
	Indiana	White lettering embossed on red base.	none	0A1234; 00A1234		County-coded registration.
	Iowa	Embossed white numbers on black with border line; "IOWA 1949" embossed at top.	none	1-12345; 1/0 123456		County-coded registration ((1 or 1/0))
	Kansas	Embossed black numbers on silver plate with border line; "KANSAS" embossed in black block letters centered at top; "19" embossed in top left corner and "49" in top right corner.	"THE WHEAT STATE" embossed in black block letters at bottom.	1-12345 10–12345; 100–1234		County-coded registration (A/B)
	Kentucky	Embossed black numbers on waffle-textured silver plate; "KENTUCKY-'49" and county name embossed in black block letters centered at top and bottom respectively.	none	123–456		Issued in blocks by county.
	Louisiana	Embossed black serial with pelican separator on yellow plate with border line; "19 LOUISIANA 49" at bottom	none	12 345; 123 456	1-001 to 380–000; 435–001 to approximately 485–000	
	Maine			123–456		
	Maryland					
	Massachusetts		none	123·456 A12·345		
	Michigan	White on black; "MICHIGAN" at top and "49" at bottom.	none	AB-12-34		County-coded. Front and rear plates required.
	Minnesota	Embossed black numbers on waffle-textured silver plate; "MINNESOTA" embossed in narrow black block letters centered at top.	12-345; 123-456	1 to approximately 871–000		"CENTENNIAL" embossed in narrow black block letters centered at bottom, with "1849" to the left and "1949" to the right. Commemorated the 100th anniversary of the creation of the Minnesota Territory.
	Mississippi	Black with embossed orange lettering and rim. The county name was stamped at the top left of the license plate, The letters "MISS" were arranged vertically between the "123" and "456" parts of the registration number.	none	123-456		Issued in blocks by county.
	Missouri	Embossed white lettering on maroon base. "MISSOURI" embossed at top center and month of validation at top left.	none	AB1-234		
	Montana	Embossed black numbers on white plate with state-shaped border; "MONTANA–49" embossed in black block letters below numbers	none	1·12345; 10·1234		County-coded registration.
	Nebraska	Red embossed lettering on white base.	none	1-A1234; 1-AB123; 10-A123; 10-AB12		County-coded (1 or 10).
	Nevada					
	New Hampshire	Embossed forest green numbers on white plate with border line; "NH 49" embossed in wide forest green block letters at top.		AB123		County-coded (AB).
	New Jersey	white embossed lettering on black base, "N.J. 49" embossed in wide block font below numbers.	none	AB-123		
	New Mexico					County-coded registration.
	New York	Embossed black lettering on golden base.	none	A-1234; AB-1234; 1234-A; 1234-AB; 1A-1234		County-coded registration.
	North Carolina	Yellow base with embossed black lettering. "NORTH CAROLINA 49" at bottom.	none	123-456		
	North Dakota					
	Ohio	Embossed yellow lettering and rims on black base. "1949 OHIO" embossed at bottom.	none	A 123 B AB 1234; 1234AB		County-coded registration.
	Oklahoma					
	Oregon					
	Pennsylvania					
	Rhode Island					
	South Carolina	Embossed black lettering and rims on white base.	none	A123-456		
	South Dakota					
	Tennessee	Embossed yellow lettering and rims on black base. "1949 TENN." embossed at bottom center.	none	12-1234		County-coded registration.
	Texas	Embossed black lettering on yellow base.	none	ABC-123	BBB-10 to approximately RKN-999	
	Utah					
	Vermont					
	Virginia					
	West Virginia					
	Wisconsin	Embossed white serial on black plate; "EXP. WISCONSIN 46" at top, slogan at bottom	AMERICA'S DAIRYLAND	1/2 12345	Coded by month of expiration (1/2)	Revalidated for 1949 with white on green tabs
	Wisconsin	Embossed white serial on black plate; "EXP. WISCONSIN 47" at top, slogan at bottom	AMERICA'S DAIRYLAND	1/2 12345	Coded by month of expiration (1/2)	Revalidated for 1949 with white on green tabs
	Wisconsin	Embossed white serial on black plate; "EXP. WISCONSIN" at top, slogan at bottom	AMERICA'S DAIRYLAND	1/2 12345	Coded by month of expiration (1/2)	Revalidated for 1949 with white on green tabs
	Wyoming					

== Non-passenger plates ==
Non-passenger Plates
Image (standard)	Region	Type	Design & Slogan	Serial format	Serials issued	Notes
	Wisconsin	Bus	Embossed black serial on orange plate; "WIS" over "BUS" at top left, "48" over "49" at top right; quarterly tab at top center	A 12	Coded by weight class (A)	
	Wisconsin	Cabin	Embossed yellow serial on black plate; "WIS. CABIN" at bottom, "EXP. - 6 - 1948" at top	1234	1 to approximately 8500	Revalidated to 1949 with unknown color tabs
	Wisconsin	Dealer	Embossed yellow serial on black plate; "19 WISCONSIN 49" at bottom, "DEALER" at top	A 1234	Dealer number and plate number	Number is the dealer number, the letters increment every time a new plate is issued to that specific dealer
	Wisconsin	Farm	Embossed white serial on brown plate; "WIS. FARM" at bottom, "EXP. - 6 - 1948" at top	123456	1 to approximately 104999	Revalidated for 1949 with black on white tabs
	Wisconsin	In transit	Embossed yellow serial on black plate; "19 WISCONSIN 49" at bottom, "IN TRANSIT" at top	AB 12	Distributor number and plate number	Number is the distributor number, letters increment every time a new plate is issued to that specific distributor
	Wisconsin	Manufacturer	Embossed yellow serial on black plate; "19 WISCONSIN 49" at bottom, "MANUFACTURER" at top	AB 12	Manufacturer number and plate number	Number is the manufacturer number, letters increment every time a new plate is issued to that specific manufacturer
	Wisconsin	Motorcycle	Embossed yellow serial on black plate with border line; "A WIS 49" at top	12345	1 to approximately 11000	
	Wisconsin	Motorcycle sidecar	Embossed yellow serial on black plate with border line; "B WIS 49" at top	123	1 to approximately 125	
	Wisconsin	Municipal	Embossed black serial on golden yellow plate; unknown format	12345	1 to approximately 11750	Motorcycle version also available
	Wisconsin	Official	Embossed black serial on golden yellow plate; unknown format	123	1 to unknown	Motorcycle version also available
	Wisconsin	School bus	Unknown format	A 12	Coded by weight class (A)	
	Wisconsin	Light private trailer	Embossed yellow serial on black plate; "WIS. TRAILER" at bottom, "EXP. - 6 - 1948" at top	1234 A	Coded by weight class (A)	Revalidated to 1949 with unknown colors tabs. Weight classes are A, B, C, and D.
	Wisconsin	Heavy trailer	Embossed black serial on orange plate; "WIS" over "TLR" at top left, "48" over "49" at top right; quarterly tab at top center	A 123	Coded by weight class (A)	Issued to all commercial trailers, and private trailers over 8,000lbs. Weight classes are A, B, C, D, E, F, G, H, J, K, L, M, N, R, S, T, V, and X for commercial trailers, and private trailers use the E weight class and above.
	Wisconsin	Light truck	Embossed yellow serial on black plate; "WIS. TRUCK" at bottom, "EXP. - 6 - 1948" at top	12345A	Coded by weight class (A)	Revalidated for 1949 with red on white tabs
	Wisconsin	Heavy truck	Embossed black serial on orange plate; "WIS" over "TRK" at top left, "48" over "49" at top right; quarterly tab at top center	A12345	Coded by weight class (A)	Weight classes are E, F, G, H, J, K, L, M, N, R, S, T, V, and X. Also issued to light trucks for hire in the A, B, C, and D weight classes.

== See also ==
- Antique vehicle registration
- Electronic license plate
- Motor vehicle registration
- Vehicle license
