= Vehicle registration plates of Hawaii =

Hawaii vehicle license plates

Hawaii
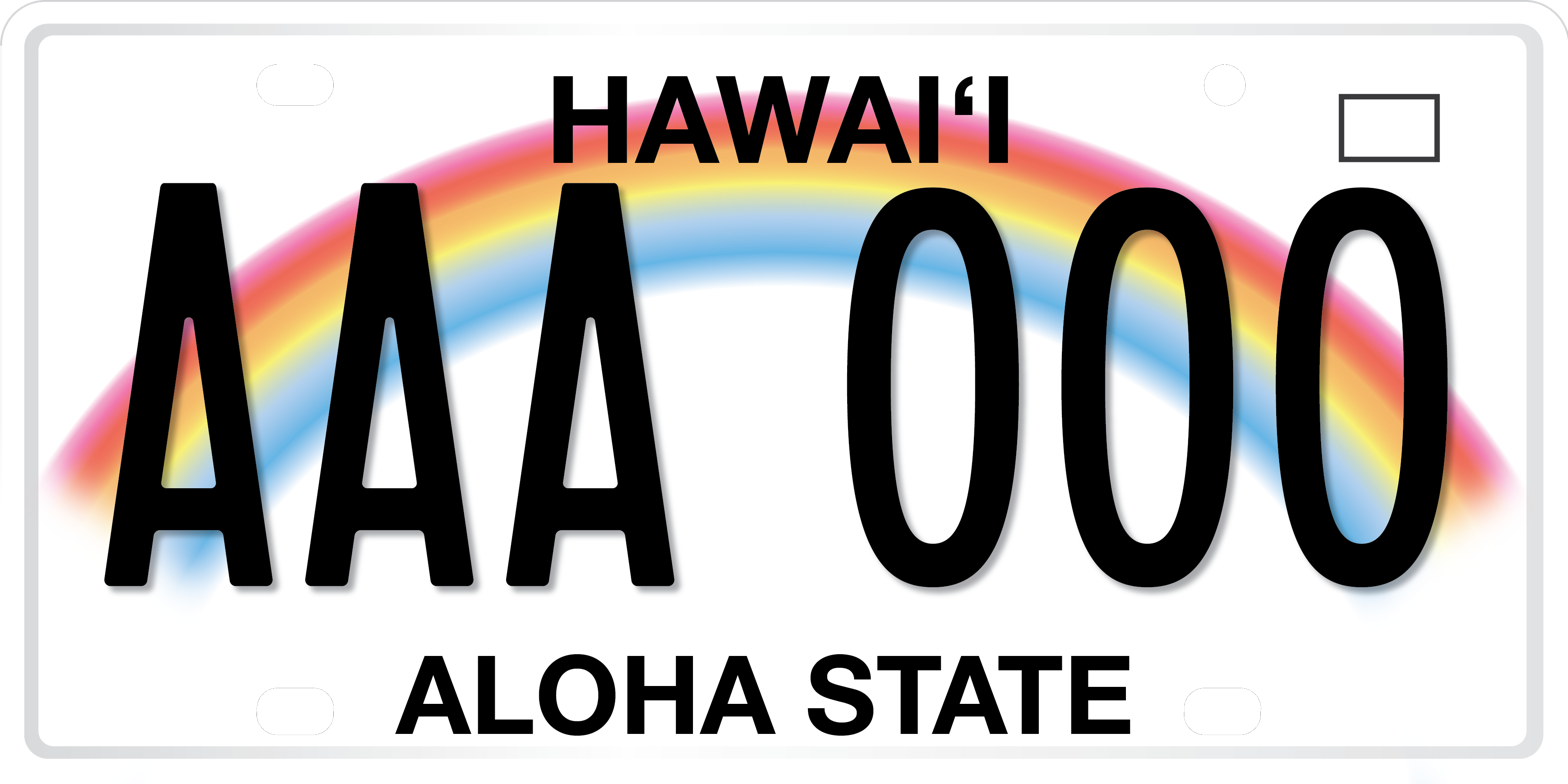
- Country: United States
- Country code: USA

Current series
- Slogan: Aloha State
- Size: 12 in × 6 in 30 cm × 15 cm
- Material: Aluminum
- Serial format: ABC 123
- Introduced: 2025 (current series)

Availability
- Issued by: County government offices
- Manufactured by: Irwin-Hodson Company, Portland, Oregon

History
- First issued: January 1, 1922 (city and county plates from 1906 to December 31, 1921)

Each of Hawaii's four counties register vehicles autonomously, starting with the City and County of Honolulu in 1906, when license plates were homemade or owner-provided. The first government-issued plates were used by both Honolulu and the County of Hawaii in 1915. Maui County first issued plates in 1919, while Kauaʻi County retained homemade plates through 1921; this was the last jurisdiction in the United States to do so. All license plates were standardized throughout the Territory of Hawaii for the first time in 1922. Despite its status at the time as a territory, Hawaii's vehicle registration laws and license plates were the same as the rest of the United States until the State of Hawaii was admitted to the U.S. as the 50th state in August 1959.

== Background ==
Hawaiʻi was a sovereign constitutional monarchy until its government was overthrown in January 1893, but many of its laws were already modeled after those of the United States, including (for example) registering dogs and issuing metal tags for them since the 1870s. The Republic of Hawaii which replaced the previous government was annexed as a Territory by the United States in August 1898, and the first automobiles to be shipped to the Hawaiian Islands arrived in 1899.

== Passenger baseplates ==
=== 1922 to 1952 ===
No slogans were used on passenger plates during the period covered by this subsection.

Image	Dates issued	Design	Serial format	Serials issued	Notes
	1922	Embossed white on dark green; vertical "HAWAII" and "1922" at right	12-345	Issued in blocks by county	Serials started from 1–000 in Honolulu County, from 20 to 000 in Hawaii County, from 30 to 000 in Maui County, and from 40 to 000 in Kauaʻi County. This continued through 1925.
	1923	Embossed green on white with border line; "HAWAII 1923" at bottom	12345	Issued in blocks by county	
	1924	Embossed red on white with border line; "HAWAII 1924" at top	12345	Issued in blocks by county	
	1925	Embossed black on orange with border line; "HAWAII 1925" at bottom	12345	Issued in blocks by county	
	1926	Embossed white on green with border line; vertical "HAWAII" and "1926" at left	12345	Issued in blocks by county	Serials started from 50000 in Honolulu County; starting serials in other counties same as 1922–25. This continued through 1939.
	1927	Embossed black on silver with border line; "HAWAII 1927" centered at bottom	12-345	Issued in blocks by county	
	1928	Embossed orange on black with border line; "HAWAII 1928" centered at bottom	12-345	Issued in blocks by county	
	1929	Embossed golden yellow on blue with border line; "HAWAII 1929" centered at top	12-345	Issued in blocks by county	
	1930	Embossed white on red with border line; "HAWAII 1930" centered at bottom	12-345	Issued in blocks by county	
	1931	Embossed white on black with border line; "HAWAII 1931" centered at top	12-345	Issued in blocks by county	
	1932	Embossed yellow on green with border line; "HAWAII 1932" centered at bottom	12-345	Issued in blocks by county	
	1933	Embossed red on orange; "HAWAII 1933" centered at top	12-345	Issued in blocks by county	
	1934	Embossed white on blue; "HAWAII 1934" centered at bottom	12-345	Issued in blocks by county	
	1935	Embossed black on golden yellow; "HAWAII 1935" centered at top	12-345	Issued in blocks by county	
	1936	Embossed white on green; "HAWAII 1936" centered at bottom	12-345	Issued in blocks by county	
	1937	Embossed blue on white; "HAWAII 1937" centered at top	12-345	Issued in blocks by county	
	1938	Embossed yellow on black; "HAWAII 1938" centered at bottom	12-345	Issued in blocks by county	
	1939	Embossed white on blue; "HAWAII 1939" centered at top	12-345	Issued in blocks by county	
	1940	Embossed black on yellow; "HAWAII 1940" at bottom, offset to right	A/A1234	County-coded (see right)	Honolulu County used O as the second letter and numbers 5000–9999; Hawaiʻi County used H and numbers 2000–2999; Maui County used M and numbers 3000–3999; and Kauaʻi County used K and numbers 4000–4999. The number allocations were used through 1950.
	1941	Embossed red on gray; "HAWAII 1941" centered at top	A1234	County-coded	
	1942–45	Embossed white on black; "HAWAII 1942" centered at bottom	A1234	County-coded	Revalidated for 1943, 1944 and 1945 with windshield stickers, due to metal conservation for World War II.
	1946	Embossed black on white; "HAWAII 1946" centered at top	A1234	County-coded	
	1947	Embossed white on green; "HAWAII 1947" centered at bottom	A1234	County-coded	
	1948	Embossed black on golden yellow; "HAWAII 1948" centered at top	A1234	County-coded	
	1949	Embossed golden yellow on black; "HAWAII 1949" centered at bottom	A1234	County-coded	
	1950	As 1948 base, but with "HAWAII 1950" at top	1A1234; A1234	County-coded	1A1234 serial format used in Honolulu County, with the prefix progressing 1A-5A, 1B-5B, etc.
	1951	As 1949 base, but with "HAWAII 51" at bottom	1A-123; A 123; A-1234	County-coded	Honolulu County used letters A, B, C, E, F, N, T, W and X; Hawaiʻi County used H and Z; Maui County used M and L; and Kauaʻi County used K. This continued through 1980.
	1952	As 1948 base, but with "HAWAII 52" at top	1A-123; A-123; A-1234	County-coded	

=== 1953 to present ===
In 1956, the United States, Canada, and Mexico came to an agreement with the American Association of Motor Vehicle Administrators, the Automobile Manufacturers Association and the National Safety Council that standardized the size for license plates for vehicles (except those for motorcycles) at 6 inches (15 cm) in height by 12 inches (30 cm) in width, with standardized mounting holes. The first Hawaii license plate that complied with these standards was a modification of the 1953 plate, introduced in 1956.

Since 1969, all Hawaii passenger plates have featured a round mounting hole at the top right and horizontal slots in the other three corners. This irregularity is to accommodate the yearly registration sticker in the upper right corner of the rear plate.

Image	Dates issued	Design	Slogan	Serial format	Serials issued	Notes
	1953–56	Embossed golden yellow on black; "HAWAII" at bottom, offset to left	none	1A-123; A-123; A-1234; 1A-1234	County-coded	Validated annually with one metal tab attached to the lower right corner of the front license plate: 1953 - plain aluminum, 1954 - black on yellow, 1955 - red on white, and 1956 - black on deep yellow.
	1957–60	Embossed white on red with border line; "HAWAII" centered at bottom	"ALOHA" centered in white at top	1A-123; A-123; A-1234; 1A-1234	County-coded	Validated annually with windshield stickers: 1957 - red on white, 1958 - gold on green, 1959 - black on yellow, 1960 - white on blue.
	1961–68	Embossed white on green with border line; "HAWAII" centered at top	"ALOHA STATE" centered in white at bottom	1A-1234; A-1234; K-12345	County-coded	Validated annually with windshield stickers: 1961- white on green, 1962 - red on yellow with Hawaii Visitors Bureau Hawaiian warrior logo, 1963 - yellow on red with Hawaii Visitors Bureau Hawaiian warrior logo, 1964 - black on gold, 1965 - white on blue, 1966 - white on green, 1967 - yellow on red, 1968 - black on gold.
	1969–75	Embossed black on reflective yellow with border line; "HAWAII" centered at top; "69" etched at top right	"ALOHA STATE" centered in black at bottom	1A-1234; A-1234; K-12345	County-coded	
	1976–80	Embossed blue on reflective white with border line; "HAWAII" centered at top; pink graphics of King Kamehameha I and Diamond Head screened in background; red hibiscus screened at top left and "76" at top right	"ALOHA STATE" centered in blue at bottom	1A-1234; A-12345	County-coded	
	1981–90	Embossed brown on reflective white; orange warrior head graphic screened in center; "HAWAII" screened in brown centered at top; "81" screened at top right	"ALOHA STATE" screened in brown centered at bottom	ABC 123	County-coded (see right)	Honolulu County used A, B, C and D as the first letter; Hawaiʻi County used H; Maui County used M; and Kauaʻi County used K. Letters I, O and Q not used, and H, K, L and M not used in Honolulu County; these practices continue today.
	1991–2025	Embossed black on reflective white; rainbow graphic screened in background; "HAWAII" screened in black centered at top	"ALOHA STATE" screened in black centered at bottom	ABC 123	County-coded	Honolulu County uses E, F, G, J, N, P, R, S, T, W and Y as the first letter; Hawaiʻi County uses H and Z; Maui County uses M and L; and Kauaʻi County uses K. The design was set to run out in Honolulu County mid-2024 with the letter W, but it was announced in late 2023 that the letters Y, A, B, C, and D had been added to Honolulu County. It is estimated that this will keep the Rainbow series in production for the next 15 years.
	2025–present	Embossed black on reflective white; rainbow graphic screened in background; "HAWAIʻI" screened in black centered at top	"ALOHA STATE" screened in black centered at bottom	ABC 123	County-coded	Honolulu County uses E, F, G, J, N, P, R, S, T, W and Y as the first letter; Hawaiʻi County uses H and Z; Maui County uses M and L; and Kauaʻi County uses K. The design was set to run out in Honolulu County mid-2024 with the letter W, but it was announced in late 2023 that the letters Y, A, B, C, and D had been added to Honolulu County. It is estimated that this will keep the Rainbow series in production for the next 15 years.

== Non-passenger types ==
=== 1981 base ===
Image	Type	Serial format	Serials issued	Notes
	City and County Government	City and County of Honolulu: C&C #### City and County Of Honolulu: 3 Numbers: ### County of Hawaiʻi: CofH ### County of Maui: CofM ### County of Kauaʻi: CofK ### County of Hawai’i/Maui/Kaua’i: 1981 Vehicles: 2 Numbers: CofH/CofM/CofK ##	City and County of Honolulu: C&C 1000–3199 (pre-1981 are before 1600 to 1700) City and County of Honolulu (1981 & TheBUS): C&C 100-999 County Of Hawaiʻi: CofH 100–999 (pre-1981 are before 420 to 435) County Of Hawaiʻi: 2 Numbers: CofH 10-99 County Of Maui: CofM 100–799 (pre-1981 are before 400 to 420) County Of Maui: 2 Numbers: (may have been used): CofM 10-99 County Of Kauaʻi: CofK 100–599 (pre-1981 likely before 180 to 200 County Of Kauaʻi: 1981-1982: County of Kaua’i: 2 Numbers: CofK 10–99	County and State Governments have a history of renewing their old vehicles, so some vehicles that have fairly new license plates may be an old vehicle. Also, the state/county tends to reuse numbers, so it may not be accurate, this data has been reported and estimated based on remaining renewed state/county vehicle title information, newspaper archives, and auction records. Water Supply in Hawaii County used County of Hawaii plates and Board of Water Supply used their own BWS plates, unknown if they used City and County of Honolulu plates pre-80s. As of 1990 Water Supply in Hawaii County started from DWS 1 with the rainbow plates up to 99 before using triple numbers. Fire Departments in Hawaii have their own plates except Kauai and Honolulu City and County fire engines which only has identification through VIN and heavy-duty commercial safety check. Hawaii County used HFD 100 to 199, pre-80s they used HFD 1 to/10 to 70/75 sharing the numbers with Honolulu Fire administrative/transport vehicles, Maui County used MFD 1 to 49.
	Honolulu Police Department	HPD 123	HPD 200 - HPD 850 (estimated)	
	Motorcycle	123 ABC	County-coded	Honolulu County used X as the first letter; Hawaiʻi County used H (starting from HMC); Maui County used M (starting from MMC); and Kauaʻi County used K (starting from KMC).
	State Government	1981-1990: State #### 1981-1982 old vehicles: (such as 1970, 1960, etc. or some vehicles) State ###	1981-1990: State 2570–5699 Early 1981: State 200-299 - State 300-399 - State 400-499 - State 500-599 - State 700-799 - State 800-899 - State 900-999 - State 1000-1099 - State 1100-1199 - State 1200-1299 - State 1500-1599 - State 1600-1699 - State 1700-1799 - State 1800-1899 - State 1900-1999 - State 2000-2099 - State 2100-2550 - State 2600–2680	County and State Governments have a history of renewing their old vehicles, so some vehicles that have fairly new license plates may be an old vehicle. State in 1981 to 1982 used 200 to 1299 to 1500 to up to 2700 to 2850 for their pre-1981 vehicles mostly, some were 1981 acquisitions. State might have used 1300 to 1499 for temporary numbers for new acquisitions which is a practice along with some numbers in State 1200 that continues today. Before 1980, State used 1300 to 1499 for older vehicles only. Also, the state/county tends to reuse numbers, so it may not be accurate, this data has been reported and estimated based on remaining renewed state/county vehicle title information, old DOT aviation pictures, and newspaper archives.
	Truck	123 ABC	County-coded	Honolulu County used T as the first letter; Hawaiʻi County used H; Maui County used M; and Kauaʻi County used K.

=== 1991 base ===
Image	Type	Serial format	Serials issued	Notes
	City and County Government	City and County of Honolulu: C&C #### County of Hawaiʻi: CofH #### County of Maui: CofM #### County of Kauaʻi: Older Plates: CK #### County of Kauaʻi: Newer Plates: CofK/Or CK ####	City and County of Honolulu: 1991-1992: C&C 3000-3299/5000-5499 1993–early 2026: C&C 4000–9999 New C&C format as of 2026: C&C 001A - C&C 999Z (current plate: C&C118A as of Sept 2026) County Of Hawaiʻi: CofH 1000–5370 County Of Maui: CofM 1000–3120 County Of Kauaʻi: Older Plates: CK 1000–1999 County of Kauaʻi: Newer Plates: CofK/Or CK 2000–2860	County and State Governments have a history of renewing their old vehicles, so some vehicles that have fairly new license plates may be an old vehicle. Some example numbers in Oahu would be 4000 to up to 5500 to 5600 estimated, Hawaii County used 1001 to 1080, 1150 to 1255, and 1400 to 1660. Maui County used 1000 to 1450. Kauai County used 1000 to 1250. Additionally, recently as of 2021 to 2023, some city and county vehicles especially in Oahu and EMS ambulances have been using organizational plates using format AB123. The new City and County license plate format as of Mar 2026 are three numbers and a letter in front similar to state but formatted backwards. It's currently using the letter A and would progress sequentially when 999 numbers are hit, letters H, K, L, M unknown and likely won't use I, O, or Q letters. County of Hawaii plates don't follow a sequential pattern. They are issued three sets of plates, one to general/administrative which would be CofH 1000 to 1149 to then CofH 1950 to 2350 to 2399 to 2450 to 2499 to 2500 to 2599 to 2700 to 2799 to 3050 to 3099 to 3200 to 3299 to 3450 to 3499 to 3600 to 3699, etc. Public works used 1400 to 1949 to 2300 to 2349 to using CofH 2400, 2500, and 2700, then to 3100 to 3400 to 3449 to CofH 42 to 52/53, P&R Parks and Recreation used 1150 to 1399 to then 2400 to 2449 to 2600 to 2649 to 3000 to 3040 to 3700 to 3850 to 4150 to 4199 to 4300 to 4399. Number 1000 weren’t issued until 2000, although 1001 to 1099 was issued since late 1990 to 1994. This also has recently been the case as of 2020 to 2021 for Hawaii County Water Supply which has their own plates which are formatted DWS XXX, currently at numbers 300 and 400 just like BWS Board of Water Supply in Oahu although BWS numbers are issued randomly from 400 to 938, not sequential. (WIP, will correct inaccuracies later).
	Honolulu Police Department	1993 - 2005: HPD 123 2005-present: HPD1234	HPD001 - HPD2265	Numeric portion of serial is the unit number of the plated vehicle.
	Motorcycle	123 XBC		First letter is X.
	State Government	1991-2001: State #### 2001–present: State A###	1991-1992: State 5500–6410 1993-2001: State 4000–9999 (skipped 7701 to 7748 but issued 7749 afterwards in 1995) 2000: State 7701-7748 2001–present: State A101-K480	County and State Governments have a history of renewing their old vehicles, so some vehicles that have fairly new license plates may be an old vehicle. State in 1993 used 4020 to 4025, then 4050 to 5000, then continuing to 6450, with expansions in State 65, 66, 67, 68, less in 69, and multiple sequences in State 70 including State 72 to 76, State 7748 to State 79 and State 80, 81, 82, 83, and 85 for renewing their old pre-1990 vehicles. Additionally, recently as of 2021 to 2023, some state vehicles have been using organizational plates using format AB123.
	TheBus	BUS123		Numeric portion of serial is the unit number of the plated vehicle.
	Trailer	123 WBC		First letter is W.
	Truck	123 TBC		First letter is T.

== Optional types ==
=== 1991 base ===
Image	Type	Design	Serial format
	America United (issued 2 weeks after 9/11/01)	Sticker at left	AB123
	Bishop Museum (first optional plate, issued 2000)	Sticker at left	AB123
	Hawaii Arts Council (2 sticker designs used)	Sticker at left	AB123
	Hawaiian Humane Society (2 sticker designs used)	Sticker at left	AB123
	Honolulu Zoo	Sticker at left	AB123
	Honolulu Police Relief Association	Sticker at left	AB123
	Hawaii Firefighters	Sticker at left	AB123
	Maui Fire Dept.	Sticker at left	AB123
	Protect Our Native Species	Sticker at left	AB123
	University of Hawaii	Sticker at left	AB123
	Kamehameha Schools	Sticker at left	AB123
	Hawaii Lions Clubs	Sticker at left	AB123
	Mighty Mo (Battleship Missouri)	Sticker at left	AB123
	National Marine Sanctuaries	Sticker at left	AB123
	Olelo Hawaii (Hawaiian language)	Sticker at left	AB123
	Respect Choice	Sticker at left	AB123
	Choose Life	Sticker at left	AB123
	Veteran	Text and American flag on left	1-9999; 001A-999Z
	Combat Veteran	Text on left	1-9999; 001A-999Z
	Combat Wounded	Text and Purple Heart design on left	1-9999; 001A-999Z
	World War II Veteran	Text on left	1-9999
	Korea Veteran	Text on left	1-9999
	Vietnam Veteran	Text on left	1-9999
	Persian Gulf Veteran	Text on left	1-9999
	Pearl Harbor Survivor	Text on left	1-9999
	Electric Vehicle	Text on left	1-9999; 001A-999Z
	Disabled	Wheelchair logo on left	1-9999; 001-999Z
	Honorary Consul	Text on left	1-9999

=== Unique base ===
Image	Type	Dates Issued	Design	Serial format	Serials issued	Notes
	Haleakalā National Park	2017–present		AB12A		
	Hawaiʻi Volcanoes National Park	2017–present		AB123		
	Polynesian Voyaging Society	2022–present		AB12A		Awarded "Plate of the Year" for best new license plate of 2022 by the Automobile License Plate Collectors Association, the first time Hawaii was so honored.
