= Vehicle registration plates of California =

California vehicle license plates

California
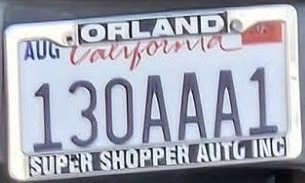
- Country: United States
- Country code: USA

Current series
- Slogan: None (1993-1998; 2001-2011); SESQUICENTENNIAL - 150 YEARS (1998-2001) dmv.ca.gov (2011-present)
- Size: 12 in × 6 in 30 cm × 15 cm
- Material: Aluminum
- Serial format: 1ABC123 (1980-2026); 123ABC1 (2026-present)
- Introduced: 1993

Availability
- Issued by: California Department of Motor Vehicles

History
- First issued: January 1, 1914 (pre-state plates and seals from 1905 to December 31, 1913)

The U.S. state of California first required its residents to register their motor vehicles in 1905. Registrants provided their own license plates for display until 1914, when the state began to issue plates. As of 2026, plates are issued by the California Department of Motor Vehicles.

Front and rear plates are required on most types of vehicle in California, including all passenger vehicles. On motorcycles and some other non-passenger types, only rear plates are required. On all vehicle types, registration validation stickers are also required, to be displayed on the rear plate, except that truck tractors and commercial vehicles with gross vehicle weight of 10,001 pounds or more shall display them on the front plate.

Since 1947, California license plates have been manufactured by inmates at Folsom State Prison.

Until around 2005, California used a reverse, or debossed, beaded edge. It was gradually phased out over the next few years in favor of a beveled edge, but still sometimes appears.

The 1ABC123 serial format was used on California's passenger license plates from 1980 to 2026. After 9ZZZ999, California adopted a new, mirrored format: 123ABC1, which was first spotted in March 2026. This format maintains the DMV's practice of flipping serial formats upon exhaustion.

== Passenger baseplates ==
=== Pre-state plates ===
Image	Dates issued	Design	Serial format	Serials issued	Notes
	1905–13	Black on white; "CAL" at right	123456	1 to 122444	A one-time $2.00 fee is paid to register the vehicle, and the motorist must have a license plate made to hang from the rear of the vehicle (front plate also required starting in 1911). These plates were valid from the date of issuance until no longer needed for that car. The seal (disc) that the motorist received from the state with the registration number, along with the license plate(s), was supposed to remain with the vehicle upon transfer to a new owner, but that did not always happen. These early plates were valid through December 31, 1913.

=== 1914 to 1962 ===
In 1956, the United States, Canada, and Mexico came to an agreement with the American Association of Motor Vehicle Administrators, the Automobile Manufacturers Association and the National Safety Council that standardized the size for license plates for vehicles (except those for motorcycles) at 6 inches (15 cm) in height by 12 inches (30 cm) in width, with standardized mounting holes. The 1955 (dated 1956) issue was the first California license plate that complied with these standards.

Image	Dates issued	Design	Serial format	Serials issued	Notes
	1914	white on red porcelain	123456	1 to 122375	Replaced all 1905–13 plates.
	1915	black on yellow porcelain	123456	1 to 163557	Brass Seal: Octagon
	1916	blue on white porcelain	123456	1 to 234317	Validation tab: 1916 Bear (Front) 1916 Bear (Rear)
	1917	blue on white porcelain	123456	234318 to 357299	Registered owners of plate numbers 1 to 234317 only received the Poppy tabs to place on their 1916 plates. Validation tab: Poppy
	1918	blue on white porcelain	123456	357300 to 485000	Registered owners of plate numbers 1 to 357299 only received the Bell tabs to place on their 1916 plates. Validation tab: Bell
	1919	blue on white porcelain	123456	485001 to 599705	Registered owners of plate numbers 1 to 485000 only received the Star tabs to place on their 1916 plates. Validation tab: Star
	1920	white on black	123-456	1 to 527–583	Changed to metal due to the high cost of porcelain.
	1921	black on yellow	123-456	1 to 651-640	
	1922	blue on white	123456	1 to 2000; 70001 to 881909	Serials 2001 through 70000 reserved for non-passenger vehicles.
	1923	white on black	123 456	1 to ?	
	1924	white on green	123-456	1 to ?	
	1925	black on yellow	123 456	1 to 30 00, 250 001 to 999 999	Serials 30 01 through 250 000 reserved for non-passenger vehicles.
	1925	black on yellow	A-12 345	A 1 to F-99 999	Serials 30 01 through 250 000 reserved for non-passenger vehicles.
	1926	white on blue	123 456	1 to 40 00, 320 001 to 999 999	Serials 40 01 through 320 000 reserved for non-passenger vehicles.
	1926	white on blue	A-12 345	A-1 to G-99 999	Serials 40 01 through 320 000 reserved for non-passenger vehicles.
	1927	white on maroon	1-234-567	1 to 50–00; 400-001 to approximately 1–860–000	First use of the full state name. Serials 50-01 through 400-000 reserved for non-passenger vehicles.
	1928	yellow on blue	1-234-567	1 to 3–000; 450-001 to approximately 2-080-000	Serials 3-001 through 450-000 reserved for non-passenger vehicles.
	1929	orange on black	1A-12-34	Coded by branch office	Letters A through M were used in Northern California, and N through Z in Southern California.
	1930	black on orange	1A-12-34	Coded by branch office	
	1931	orange on black	1A 12 34	Coded by branch office	
	1932	black on orange	1A 12 34	Coded by branch office	
	1933	orange on black	1A 12 34	Coded by branch office	
	1934	black on orange	1A 12 34	Coded by branch office	
	1935	orange on black	1A 12 34	Coded by branch office	
	1936	black on orange	1A 12 34; 10 A 123	Coded by branch office	
	1937	orange on black	1A 12 34; A/A 12 34	Coded by branch office	
	1938	black on yellow	1A 12 34; 10 A 123	Coded by branch office	
	1939	yellow on blue	1A 12 34; 10 A 123	Coded by branch office	
	1940	black on orange	1A 12 34; 10 A 123	Coded by branch office	
	1941–44	yellow on black	1A 23 45; 12 A 345	1A 1 to ?	Citizens that got the 1941 base plate in 1941 got this tab for revalidation. Validation tab for 1942:
	1941–44	yellow on black	1A 23 45; 12 A 345	1A 1 to ?	Validation tab for 1943: It was issued due to metal conservation for World War II.
	1941–44	yellow on black	1A 23 45; 12 A 345	1A 1 to ?	Validation sticker for 1944: It was issued due to metal conservation for World War II.
	1945–46	white on black	1A 23 45; 12 A 345	1A 1 to ?	Only rear plates issued. Validation tab for 1946:
	1947–50	black on yellow	1A 23 456; 12A 3 456	1A 1 to ?	Validation tab for 1948:
	1947–50	black on yellow	1A 23 456; 12A 3 456	1A 1 to ?	Validation tab for 1949:
	1947–50	black on yellow	1A 23 456; 12A 3 456	1A 1 to ?	Validation tab for 1950:
	1951–55	yellow on black	1A 23 456; 12 A 3 456	1A 1 to ?	Validation tab for 1952:
	1951–55	yellow on black	1A 23 456; 12 A 3 456	1A 1 to ?	Validation tab for 1953:
	1951–55	yellow on black	1A 23 456; 12 A 3 456	1A 1 to ?	Validation tab for 1954:
	1951–55	yellow on black	1A 23 456; 12 A 3 456	1A 1 to ?	Validation tab for 1955:
	1956–62	black on yellow	ABC 123	AAA 000 to approximately YRT 999	Validation sticker for 1957:
	1956–62	black on yellow	ABC 123	AAA 000 to approximately YRT 999	Validation sticker for 1958:
	1956–62	black on yellow	ABC 123	AAA 000 to approximately YRT 999	Validation sticker for 1959:
	1956–62	black on yellow	ABC 123	AAA 000 to approximately YRT 999	Validation sticker for 1960:
	1956–62	black on yellow	ABC 123	AAA 000 to approximately YRT 999	Validation sticker for 1961:
	1956–62	black on yellow	ABC 123	AAA 000 to approximately YRT 999	Validation sticker for 1962:

=== 1963 to present ===
All plates from 1963 until present are still valid, provided they are displayed on the vehicle to which they were originally issued and the vehicle has been continuously registered. Along with the pre-1963 plates above, these plates can be used for the year-of-manufacture program, with appropriate year sticker.

The 1ABC123 serial format began in 1980. In this format, the ABC123 portion of the serial progresses from AAA000 to ZZZ999, before the leading digit advances by one and the progression begins again. All letters are used, although I, O and Q are only used as the second letter (third character in 1ABC123 format or fifth character in the new 123ABC1 format). Series 1SWD000 through 1TZZ999, 1WAA000 through 1ZYZ999, 3FMH000 through 3FZZ999, 3YAA000 through 3ZYZ999, and 3ZZH000 through 3ZZZ999, have all not been issued, while others have been reserved for non-passenger and optional plates, such as 1ZZA000 through 1ZZZ999 and 3ZZA000 through 3ZZG999 for Livery plates, and 1UAA000 through 1VZZ999 for Lake Tahoe, Yosemite and Coastal Protection ("Whale Tail") plates.

The 123ABC1 serial format began in March 2026, following the exhaustion of the previous format.

Certain three-letter strings that may be regarded as sensitive, such as KKK and DIE, are excluded. Furthermore, the letters I, O and Q are not used for the first or third alphabetical characters.

Image	First issued	Design	Slogan	Serial format	Serials issued	Notes
	1963	embossed gold on black, embossed state name and debossed "63" on top right sticker box	none	ABC 123	AAA 000 to ZZZ 999	The oldest still allowed on the road today, but some older license plates have been seen.
	1969	embossed gold serial on blue, state name on top	none	123 ABC	000 AAA to 999 ZZZ	Monthly staggered registration introduced 1976. I, O and Q not used as first letters in the 123 ABC serial format. Narrower serial dies introduced starting with 000 WLA in late 1977, in preparation for the 1ABC123 format.
	1980	embossed gold serial on blue, state name on top	none	1ABC123	1AAA000 to 1SWC999	Monthly staggered registration introduced 1976. I, O and Q not used as first letters in the 123 ABC serial format. Narrower serial dies introduced starting with 000 WLA in late 1977, in preparation for the 1ABC123 format.
	1982	blue on reflective white with graphic Art Deco state name	The Golden State	1ABC123	2AAA000 to 2GPZ999	Extra-cost optional plate until 1987, when it briefly became the standard passenger base after the 1969 blue base was discontinued. Awarded "Plate of the Year" for best new license plate of 1983 by the Automobile License Plate Collectors Association, the first and, to date, only time California has been so honored. This plate design was seen in the opening credits of the television drama L.A. Law, which aired on NBC from 1986 to 1994. This is also the design which appears on the DeLorean in the 'Back to the Future' films, with the registration 'OUTATIME'. The validation sticker corresponded to the year of each episode's air date.
	1987	blue on reflective white with embossed red state name	none	1ABC123	2GQA000 to 3FMG999	3FMH-3FZZ not issued.
	1993	blue on reflective white with graphic red state name	none	1ABC123	3GAA000 to approximately 3JZZ999	The state name changed from an embossed state name to a graphic state name. Wells for month and year stickers are no longer debossed.
White background with blue text and red text at the top of the plate reading “California”	1995	blue on reflective white with graphic red state name	none	1ABC123	3KAA000 to 3XZZ999	3ZZA-3ZZG for livery 3Y and all other 3Z series unissued. The state name was modified to increase its size.
	1998	blue on reflective white with graphic red state name	SESQUICENTENNIAL - 150 YEARS	1ABC123	4AAA000 to 4NOZ999	Slogan added to celebrate 150 years since California's statehood.
A California license plate with blue text on white background. On the top reads “California” in red.	2001	blue on reflective white with graphic red state name	none	1ABC123	4NPA000 to 6TPV999	Slogan removed. Same as 1995 base.
	2011	blue on reflective white with graphic red state name	dmv.ca.gov	1ABC123	6TPW000 to 9ZZZ999	DMV web address added as a slogan.
	2026	blue on reflective white with graphic red state name	dmv.ca.gov	123ABC1	000AAA1 to approximately 866CBZ1 (as of November 19, 2026)	New serial format, following exhaustion of the 1ABC123 format. Same as 2011 base.

== Non-passenger vehicle plates ==
Image	Type	First issued	Serial format	Serials issued	Notes
	Amateur Radio		FCC call sign		Issued to holders of FCC amateur radio station licenses, upon request.
	Antique Motorcycle		ANTIQUE M/C 123		Available upon request for any motorcycle manufactured in 1942 or before.
	Apportioned	1982	AP12345	AP00001 to approximately BP10000	These plates are used on non-tractor units such as charter buses, box trucks, and tow trucks. Two plates are issued.
	Apportioned	1987	AP12345	BP30001 to CP99999; EP00001 to EP09999	Around the CP75000 mark, the "Cal Apportioned" block letters changed from red to blue. The DP series was skipped as it is already used on Disabled plates.
	Apportioned	2020	AP12345	EP10000 to EP25661 (as of October 25, 2025)	
	Apportioned - Tractor Unit	1992	AP12345	SP00001 to approximately VP69999	Serials with prefix SP-ZP are issued to single-plate vehicles such as truck tractors. FP added in 2026 once ZP series was exhausted.
	Apportioned - Tractor Unit	2011	AP12345	VP70000 to ZP99999; FP00001 to FP14550 (as of November 3, 2026)	Serials with prefix SP-ZP are issued to single-plate vehicles such as truck tractors. FP added in 2026 once ZP series was exhausted.
	Apportioned - Trailer	1982	AT12345	AT00001 to approximately BT99999	Prefixes AT-HT were used on trailer plates issued between 1982 and 2001, replaced with Permanent Trailer in 2001.
	Apportioned - Trailer	1987	AT12345	CT00001 to approximately HT23411	Prefixes AT-HT were used on trailer plates issued between 1982 and 2001, replaced with Permanent Trailer in 2001.
	Citizens Band		ABC1234		Were issued upon request for holders of FCC citizens band radio licenses until 1983. Plate numbers and letters represent the call letters assigned by the FCC.
	Commercial	1963	A 12 345	A 10 000 to V 99 999	
	Commercial	1967	12 345 A	10 000 A to 99 999 J	
	Commercial	1970	12 345 A	00 000 K to 99 999 Z	
	Commercial	1976	1A12345	1A00000 to 2Y05999 (serials 2Y06000-2Z99999 unissued)	
	Commercial	1982	1A12345	3A00000 to 3P59999	
	Commercial	1987	1A12345	3P60000 to 5A99999	
	Commercial	1993	1A12345	5B00000 to 5S99999	
	Commercial	1998	1A12345	5T00000 to 6J99999	With "Sesquicentennial - 150 Years" slogan.
	Commercial	2001	1A12345	6K00000 to 8Z99999	9A00000 through 9Z99999 reserved for tractor trailer units.
	Commercial	2010	12345A1	00000A1 to 99999E1	9A00000 through 9Z99999 reserved for tractor trailer units.
	Commercial	2011	12345A1	00000F1 to 58697P4 (as of Nov 3, 2026)	With "dmv.ca.gov" slogan.
	Disabled Person	1995	12345D/P	00001D/P to 99999D/P	Before 1995, California issued only placards which were displayed on the dashboard when parking.
	Disabled Person	late 1990s	D/P12345	D/P00001 to D/P99999	Before 1995, California issued only placards which were displayed on the dashboard when parking.
	Disabled Person	early 2000s	D/PA1234	D/PA0001 to D/PZ9999	Before 1995, California issued only placards which were displayed on the dashboard when parking.
	Disabled Person	2006	1234AD/P	0001AD/P to 9999ZD/P	Before 1995, California issued only placards which were displayed on the dashboard when parking.
	Disabled Person	2011	D/P123AB	D/P001AA to D/P999ZZ	Before 1995, California issued only placards which were displayed on the dashboard when parking.
	Disabled Person	2019	AB123D/P	AA001D/P to YU718D/P (as of Oct 17, 2026)	Before 1995, California issued only placards which were displayed on the dashboard when parking.
	Disabled Person – Motorcycle		1234D/P		
	Disabled Person – Motorcycle		12D/P34		
	Disabled Person – Motorcycle		D/P1234		
	Disabled Veteran	1987	DV12345	DV00000-DV1xxxx	
	Disabled Veteran	1994	12345D/V	00001D/V to 99999D/V	
	Disabled Veteran	2023	D/V12345	D/V1xxxx to D/V85782 (as of Nov 3, 2026)	It is suspected that this issue began somewhere in the D/V1xxxx series to avoid conflicts with any remaining issues from the 1987 series. (Lowest spotted to date: D/V17664)
	Exempt – Local	1963	E123456	E100000-E999999	Black plate with yellow numbering consisting of letter E in octagon and 6-digit number for district-, city- and county-owned vehicles
	Exempt – Local	1970	E123456	E100000-E999999	Blue plate with yellow numbering consisting of letter E in octagon and 6-digit number for district-, city- and county-owned vehicles
	Exempt – Local	1987	E123456	E100000-E999999	White plate with Golden State design and blue numbering consisting of letter E in octagon and 6-digit number for district-, city- and county-owned vehicles
	Exempt – Local	1987	E123456	E100000-E999999	White plate with blue numbering consisting of letter E in octagon and 6-digit number for district-, city- and county-owned vehicles. "California" is in red block font. For "E0....." plate, see below
	Exempt – Local	1993	E123456	E100000-E999999	White plate with blue numbering consisting of letter E in octagon and 6-digit number for district-, city- and county-owned vehicles. "California" is in red script font. For "E0....." plate, see below
	Exempt – State	1963	E12345	E00000-E99999	Black plate with yellow numbering consisting of letter E in diamond and 5-digit number for state-owned vehicles
	Exempt – State	1970	E12345	E00000-E99999	Blue plate with yellow numbering consisting of letter E in diamond and 5-digit number for state-owned vehicles
	Exempt – State	1987	E123456	E000000-E999999	White plate with Golden State design and blue numbering consisting of letter E in diamond and 6-digit number for state-owned vehicles.
	Exempt – State	1987	E123456	E000000-E999999	White plate with blue numbering consisting of letter E in diamond and 6-digit number for state-owned vehicles. "California" is in red block font.
	Exempt – State	1993	E123456	E000000-E999999	White plate with blue numbering consisting of letter E in diamond and 6-digit number for state-owned vehicles. "California" is in red script font.
	Exempt	1998	1234567	1000001 to 1762669	Issued to all exempt vehicles, regardless of ownership. "CA EXEMPT" screened at top. Some plates were issued as "E0....." due to a surplus of prestamped octagon "E" plates. On these plates the "E" was to be considered "1". They still had "California" in script font.
	Exempt - Motorcycle	1998	3123456	3000001 to 3015413 (as of November 3, 2026)	
	Foreign Organization		FOREIGN ORGANIZATION 123		Issued to vehicles registered to an officer or designated employee of the Taipei Economic and Cultural Office pursuant to the Taiwan Relations Act. Eligibility is provided to DMV by the American Institute in Taiwan.
	Historical Vehicle	1972	HISTORICAL VEHICLE 123A	? to 9999; 001A to 999Z; A001 to A034 (as of February 12, 2022)	Available upon request for any vehicle manufactured after 1922 that is at least 25 years old.
	Honorary Consul	1982	HON CONSUL CORPS 1234		Issued to Honorary Consuls upon request.
	Honorary Consul	1988	HON CONSUL CORPS 1234		Issued to Honorary Consuls upon request.
	Horseless Carriage	1984	HORSELESS CARRIAGE 1234		Available upon request for any vehicle manufactured in 1922 or before, or for motor vehicles with 16 or more cylinders manufactured prior to 1965.
	Livery		1ZZA123	1ZZA000 to 1ZZZ999; 3ZZA000 to 3ZZG999	"LIVERY" screened at bottom. Issued to limos and fleet vehicles until program eliminated by Senate Bill 611 on September 30, 2014. Plates remain valid but cannot be replaced or reassigned.
	Moped		C123456	C000001 to C080499 (as of March 15, 2024)	
	Motorcycle	1970	1A1234	1A0000 to 9Z9999	Letter progresses before prefix number (11A–11Z, 12A–12Z, etc.). I, O and Q not used. In 1986, the blue base finally reached 9Z9999, so to avoid conflicts with the new white baseplates, the remaining blue plates were issued with serials starting with 21A, 22A, etc. all the way to 29A. They continued on the blue base with prefixes 21B, 22B, etc. and reached 27B before the blue baseplates were exhausted in 1987.
	Motorcycle	1982	12A1234	11A0000 to 27N4275 (as of Oct 12, 2026)	This series began in 1982 with prefix 11A, as an extra-cost reflective option, until January 1987, when only white plates were issued. Serials 10A0000 - 10Z9999 were not issued, but serials 20A0000 - 20Z9999 were issued. To avoid conflicting with the final run of blue baseplates above, prefixes 21A-29A and 21B-27B are not issued on white baseplates.
	Permanent Trailer	2001	4AB1234	4AA1000 to 4XT3015 (as of Oct 6, 2026)	"California Perm Trailer" across top.
	Press Photographer	1987	P/P 1234	P/P ???? to P/P 4301 (as of January 3, 2024)	The letters “PP” inside a triangle.
	Press Photographer	2011	P/P 1234	P/P ???? to P/P 4301 (as of January 3, 2024)	The letters “PP” inside a triangle.
	Prorate Plate	Unknown	N/A	N/A	No longer in circulation. Used by interstate fleets to display apportioned stickers. California's stickers are placed in the third well from the top on the left side.
	Public Service (state representative)	Unknown	P/S12345		
	Special Equipment	1970	S/E123456	? to S/E 776946 (as of November 3, 2026)	Motorcycle-sized. Registration lasts for five years.
	Special Equipment	1985	S/E123456	? to S/E 776946 (as of November 3, 2026)	Motorcycle-sized. Registration lasts for five years.
	Temporary	2019	AB12C12	AA00A00 to EX99P68 (as of Nov 3, 2026)	Issued to new vehicles purchased in California. Serials AU-AW, BC-BF, BM-BN, BV-BZ, CU-CX, DP-DU, ED, and EK were skipped, although some serials were issued later on. Letters I, O, and Q are not used.
	Tournament of Roses	1998	TOFR123	TOFR1 to TOFR112 (as of December 1, 2022)	Used on parade vehicles during the Tournament of Roses parade.
	Tractor Trailer	1987	9A12345	9A00000 to ?	
	Tractor Trailer	1993	9A12345	? to 9E99999	
	Tractor Trailer	2011	9A12345	9F00000 to 9H51855 (as of November 13, 2026)	With "dmv.ca.gov" slogan.
	Trailer	1963	AB 1234	AA 1000 to HV 9999	No serials (HW 0000 to HW 9999) issued
	Trailer	1971	AB 1234	HX 1000 to TZ 9999	The UA-YX series was reserved for commercial weight fee trailers. It was issued on the gold-on-blue base from 1971 to 1983.
	Trailer	1983	1AB1234	1AA1000 to approximately 1BJ9999	
	Trailer	1987	1AB1234	1BP1000 to approximately 1ET9999	
	Trailer	1993	1AB1234	1EU1000 to approximately 1GS9999	
	Trailer	1998	1AB1234	Approximately 1GT1000 to approximately 1JR9999	"Sesquicentennial" at bottom.
	Trailer	2001	1AB1234	Approximately 1JS1000 to approximately 1ME9999	No text at bottom.
	Trailer	2011	1AB1234	Approximately 1MF1000 to 1PP1853 (as of November 13, 2026)	dmv.ca.gov at bottom.
	Trailer (commercial)	1983	1AB1234	1UA1000 to 1UZ9999	The 1UA-1YX series was reserved for commercial weight fee trailers. Its issue began on the Golden State base in 1983 and continued onto the red-on-white "lipstick" base until its replacement by the Permanent Trailer plate in 2001. The highest spotted serial in this series is 1XE1140 (seen on Aug 19, 2013). The series had been expected to reach 1YX8000. The 1ZA-1ZW series is assigned to certain specialty trailers (Yosemite, Lake Tahoe, Protect our Ocean and our Coast, etc.) 1YY-1YZ and 1ZX-1ZZ will be of unknown use. These number formatted plates have also been issued to special exempted vehicles, such as full size, retitled school buses that have been converted to recreational vehicles. These vehicles are exempt from the California Air Resources Board 14001 GVWR rules.
	Trailer (commercial)	1987	1AB1234	1VA1000 to approximately 1VW9999	
	Trailer (commercial)	1993	1AB1234	1VX1000 to approximately 1WM9999	
	Trailer (commercial)	1998	1AB1234	Approximately 1WN1000 to approximately 1WU9999	"Sesquicentennial" at bottom.
	Trailer (commercial)	2001	1AB1234	Approximately 1WV1000 to approximately 1XE1140	No text at bottom.
	Vehicle Identification Number (VIN) Plate				Assigned by the DMV or CHP when a number is removed, destroyed, or obliterated.

=== Occupational plates ===
On each occupational plate type, the full-size number is constant for each distributing entity, while the small suffix (or prefix on the Special Equipment Dealer/Manufacturer plate) varies. Only rear plates are required for each type.

Image	Type	First issued	Serial format	Notes
	Dealer	1970	DEALER 1234 1/2/A	
	Dealer	1987	D/L/R 12345 1/2/A	
	Dealer	1987	D/L/R 12345 1/2/A	
	Dealer	1993	D/L/R 12345 1/2/A	
	Dealer	2011	D/L/R 12345 1/2/A	
	Dismantler		D/S/M 1234 1/2/A	
	Manufacturer		M/F/G 1234 1/2/A	
	New Vehicle Distributor		D/S/T 1234 1/2/A	
	Remanufacturer		R/M/F 1234 1/2/A	
	Special Equipment Dealer		DLR 1A 12345	Motorcycle-sized.
	Special Equipment Manufacturer		1A MFG 1234	Motorcycle-sized.
	Transporter		T/R/N 1234 1/2/A	

=== Legislative plates ===
Image	Type	First issued	Serial format	Notes
	Assembly Member		A 12	Issued to current and retired members of the California State Assembly. The number in the serial corresponds to the district represented by the Assembly member. A small 'A' by the number indicates a second vehicle owned by the Assembly member. A small 'R' indicates a retired Assembly member, and a small '1' after the small 'R' indicates a second vehicle owned by the retired Assembly member.
	Representative		U.S. CONGRESS 1	Issued to current U.S. representatives. A small 'A' by the number indicates a second vehicle owned by the representative, a small 'B' indicates a third vehicle, and so on.
	State Senator		S 12	Issued to current and retired members of the California State Senate. The number in the serial corresponds to the district represented by the senator. A small 'S' by the number indicates a second vehicle owned by the senator. A small 'R' indicates a retired senator, and a small '1' after the small 'R' indicates a second vehicle owned by the retired senator.
	U.S. Senator		UNITED STATES SENATE 1	Issued to current U.S. senators. A small 'A' by the number indicates a second vehicle owned by the U.S. Senator, a small 'B' indicates a third vehicle, and so on.

=== Stickers ===
Image	Type	First issued	Notes
	Emissions controlled OHV		Assigned to motor vehicles that are used on roads not publicly maintained (e.g., in State Parks and National Forests). The green sticker program existed as a means of generating revenue for the maintenance of state OHV areas.
	Uncontrolled OHV	1999	Emissions controlled OHVs are granted Green Stickers while uncontrolled OHVs such as motocross and closed-course off-road racebikes are granted Red Stickers for seasonal use on public lands.

== Optional types (specialty plates) ==
Image	Type	First issued	Design	Serial format	Serials issued	Notes
	1984 Olympics—Motorcycle	1984		L/A12345; U/S12345	L/A00000 to present	Issued until December 31, 1984. Duplicates were available until December 31, 1989. No longer issued, but still revalidated.
A background consisting of the colors white, red, and blue. At the top, “California” is shown in white text.	1984 Olympics—Passenger	1984		L/A12345; U/S12345	L/A00000 to present	Issued until December 31, 1984. Duplicates were available until December 31, 1989. No longer issued, but still revalidated.
	Agriculture	2013	An image on the left of the plate with the sun on the horizon of a field	123ABC; A123B4	A001R0 to A813A1 (as of October 25, 2025) Using previously unused letter blocks.	White plate with artwork of the sun screened at left and "Agriculture" screened at bottom. With other specialty plates also using different variations of the A123B4 series, A001A1 came after A999R0 for the Agriculture plates.
	Arts Council	1994	The sun setting over the coast	ABC123; 123ABC; A123B0; A123B1	? to A166U1 (as of June 11, 2026) Using previously unused letter blocks.	"Coastline" design by Wayne Thiebaud.
	Bill of Rights	1990	Blue on white with red Liberty Bell graphic	1234 US	0001 US to 1024 US (as of January 1, 2024)	Issued from July 1, 1990, until December 31, 1991. Commemorated the 200th anniversary of the Bill's ratification.
	Breast Cancer Awareness	2017	A pink background with a pink bow on the left	B123A1	B001A1 to B852E1 (as of February 12, 2024)	Pink plate with pink ribbon screened at left and "Early Detection Saves Lives" screened at bottom.
	California Museums (Snoopy)	2016	An image of Snoopy	S123A0	S001A0 to S574N0 (as of October 10, 2026)	White plate with Peanuts character Snoopy screened at left and "museums are for everyone" screened at bottom.
	Children's Trust Fund			ABC123; A123B0	Using previously unused letter blocks.	An embossed heart, hand, star, or plus sign appears to the left of the serial, or can be incorporated into "vanity" numbers.
	Congressional Medal of Honor 84 —Passenger	1984		12	?	Given to Medal of Honor recipients.
	Congressional Medal of Honor 93 —Passenger	1993		12	?	Given to Medal of Honor recipients.
	Faithful to State Parks (San Francisco 49ers)	2025	An image of the San Francisco 49ers logo	B123A1	B001M1 to B702U1 (as of April 29, 2026)	White plate with the San Francisco 49ers logo screened at left and "Faithful to State Parks" screened at bottom.
	Firefighter—Motorcycle			00A12	00A01 to ?	
	Firefighter—Passenger	1995		ABC123; A123B4	? to A184B1 (as of November 18, 2025) Using previously unused letter blocks.	Only active or retired firefighter can apply for this type of plate. Logo of a firefighter on a blazing background. With other specialty plates also using different variations of the A123B4 series, A001B1 came after A999J0 for the Firefighter plates.
	Gold Star Family —Passenger	2011		123ABC	000HUY to 060HYE (as of February 23, 2026) Using previously unused letter blocks.	Given to family of fallen soldiers while in the line of duty.
	Lake Tahoe Version 1 - Commercial	1996		2Z12345	2Z35000 to 2Z37999	No longer issued but still revalidated.
	Lake Tahoe Version 1 - Passenger	1996	An image meant to depict Lake Tahoe as a background	1UAB123	1UEA000 to 1UE????	No longer issued but still revalidated.
	Lake Tahoe Version 2 - Commercial	2011	A yellow sky over some mountains	2Z12345	2Z38000 to 2Z40593 (as of February 18, 2024)	Using previously unused letter blocks.
	Lake Tahoe Version 2 - Passenger	2011	A yellow sky over some mountains	1UAB123	1UE???? to 1UEZ922 (as of October 14, 2026)	Using previously unused letter blocks.
	Legacy	2015	Gold on reflective black	A123B4	B001A0 to M157L1 (as of October 12, 2026)	In the style of the 1963–69 passenger plate. 'S123A0' series of plates are reserved for California Museums (Snoopy) plate, shown above. C001A1 came after X999Z0, meaning the 'Y123A0' and 'Z123A0' series of plates were skipped. 'B123A1' series of plates are reserved for Breast Cancer Awareness and Faithful to State Parks (San Francisco 49ers) plates, shown above. The same series (A123B4) is used on both passenger and motorcycle plates. C123A0 is reserved for motorcycles. A123B0 series of plates is reserved for many other specialty plates. The cycle went B001A0, B002A0, B003A0, ..., B998A0, B999A0, B001B0, ..., B998Z0, B999Z0, C001A0, ..., X998Z0, X999Z0, C001A1, and on and on and on. Last will probably be X999Z9. i.e. The A123B4 series works like 4-A123B, the "4" doesn't progress until a cycle of B001A-Z999Z completes.
	Legion of Valor—Passenger		Blue on white	LEGION OF VALOR 123	001 to LEGION OF VALOR 279 (as of December 24, 2023)	Sticker placed at right denoting the decoration held by the registrant: Medal of Honor (Army, Navy or Air Force), Distinguished Service Cross, Navy Cross, or Air Force Cross.
	Olympic Training Center Version 1	1990		C/A12345; U/S12345	?	No longer issued, but still revalidated.
	Olympic Training Center Version 2	1999		C/A12345; U/S12345	?	No longer issued, but still revalidated.
	Olympic Training Center Version 3	2000		C/A12345; U/S12345	?	
	Pearl Harbor Survivor —Passenger		Blue on white; "PEARL HARBOR SURVIVOR" in blue at left	1234	0001 to 3637 (as of September 5, 2022)	Issued to members of the Armed Forces stationed within 3 miles of Pearl Harbor Naval Base on Dec. 7, 1941, and honorably discharged. May be retained on a vehicle owned by a surviving spouse.
	Pet Lover	2012		123ABC	001END to 779PUG(as of May 18, 2025) Using previously unused letter blocks, including CAT, PUG, SAT, MUT, YES, WAG, and END	White plate with artwork from international actor, artist, and pet lover Pierce Brosnan screened at left and "Spay & Neuter Saves Lives" screened at bottom.
	Protect Our Coast & Ocean Version 1 - Commercial	1997		2Z12345	2Z50000 to approx. 2Z50999	No longer issued, but still revalidated.
	Protect Our Coast & Ocean Version 1 - Passenger	1997		1VAB123	1VAA000 to 1VAZ999	No longer issued, but still revalidated.
	Protect Our Coast & Ocean Version 2 - Commercial	ca. 1998		2Z12345	Approx. 2Z51000 to approx. 2Z53999	After a short time, the artist's name, "WYLAND", was added to the lower right corner, and the colors were slightly modified. No longer issued, but still revalidated.
	Protect Our Coast & Ocean Version 2 - Passenger	ca. 1998		1VAB123	1VDA000 to 1VDY999	After a short time, the artist's name, "WYLAND", was added to the lower right corner, and the colors were slightly modified. No longer issued, but still revalidated.
	Protect Our Coast & Ocean Version 3 – Commercial	2011		2Z12345	Approx. 2Z54000 to 2Z60091 (as of May 13, 2026)	This is the current version that is available today.
	Protect Our Coast & Ocean Version 3 – Passenger	2011		1VAB123	1VDZ000 to 1VEX212 (as of May 17, 2026)	This is the current version that is available today.
	Purple Heart			1234PH	0001PH to 9999PH	
	Purple Heart			PH1234	PH0001 to PH9999	
	Purple Heart			12PH34	00PH01 to 53PH54 (as of August 29, 2026)	
	Purple Heart—Motorcycle			1234PH; PH1234; 12PH34		
	POW Ex-Prisoner of War —Motorcycle			POW1234		
	POW Ex-Prisoner of War 93 —Passenger	1993		POW1234		
	POW Ex-Prisoner of War 00 —Passenger	2000		POW1234	? to POW7867 (as of December 26, 2024)	
	Veteran Version 1	1994		ABC123; 123ABC	? to F105IP (as of November 3, 2014)	No longer issued.
	Veteran Version 2	2012		123ABC; A123B0	? to A700X0 (as of February 9, 2026) Using previously unused letter blocks.	
	We Will Never Forget	2002		1234MA	0001MA to 4004MB (as of February 21, 2024)	
	University of California, Los Angeles	1994		ABC123	APA101 to APA999	
	Yosemite National Park - Commercial	1993		2Z12345	2Z00001 to 2Z10540 (as of April 1, 2025)	
	Yosemite National Park - Passenger	1993		1UAB123	1UAA000 to 1UBS091 (as of September 15, 2026)	

See the Passenger Baseplates section above for the 1982–87 "Golden State" plate, which was briefly issued as the standard passenger base.

== Year-of-manufacture plates ==
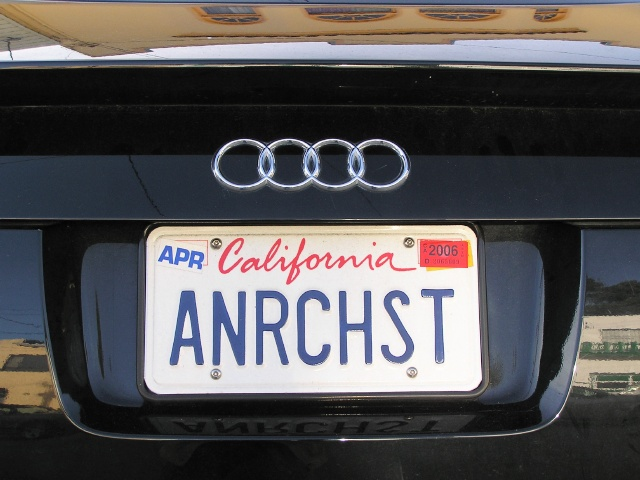
A California car license plate saying ANRCHST (a vanity plate–speak form of anarchist) from 2006

The use of year-of-manufacture (YOM) plates is authorized by Section 5004.1 of the California Motor Vehicle Code. It is a law that allows vintage cars to be registered to use vintage license plates. Any officially manufactured California license plates which were produced prior to 1963 can be used on a currently registered vehicle or trailer of a corresponding model year. If used on the original plate, a sticker or metal tab that corresponds to the year of the vehicle is required.

As of July 2024, YOM program extends only to 1980 and older year model auto, commercial, motorcycle and trailer vehicles, as long as they are "clear" with the DMV (i.e., not used, reported stolen, or any records found, for the last 10 years). A valid sticker must be attached to the plate corresponding to the year of the vehicle that is to be registered.

In August 2016, California extended the year-of-manufacture license plate program to include vehicles through the 1980 model year.

== California Legacy License Plate program ==
The legacy California license plate that released in 2015.

The California Legacy License Plate program offers vehicle owners the opportunity to purchase replicas of California license plates similar to those issued in the 1960s. California proposed issuing plates similar to those of the 1950s, 1960s and 1970s. The original plan was to restrict the plate colors to what would have been issued to the vehicle when purchased new. After a few months, the program was opened to all model years. Only the 1960s (gold on black) plate reached the required 7,500 minimum orders before January 1, 2015. The 1950s (black on gold) and 1970s (gold on blue) plates did not achieve the required 7,500 minimum orders. The plates were issued starting from late spring through summer 2015 and, as of 2025, are still available for order from the DMV website. Additional time is required for personalized plates. These plates use a newer reflective black coating in contrast to the original dull black paint. Additionally, original 1960s plates utilize a wider die for the characters, originally designed for 6-character plates. New Legacy plates utilize the narrower dies of modern 7-digit plates.

== Temporary license plates ==
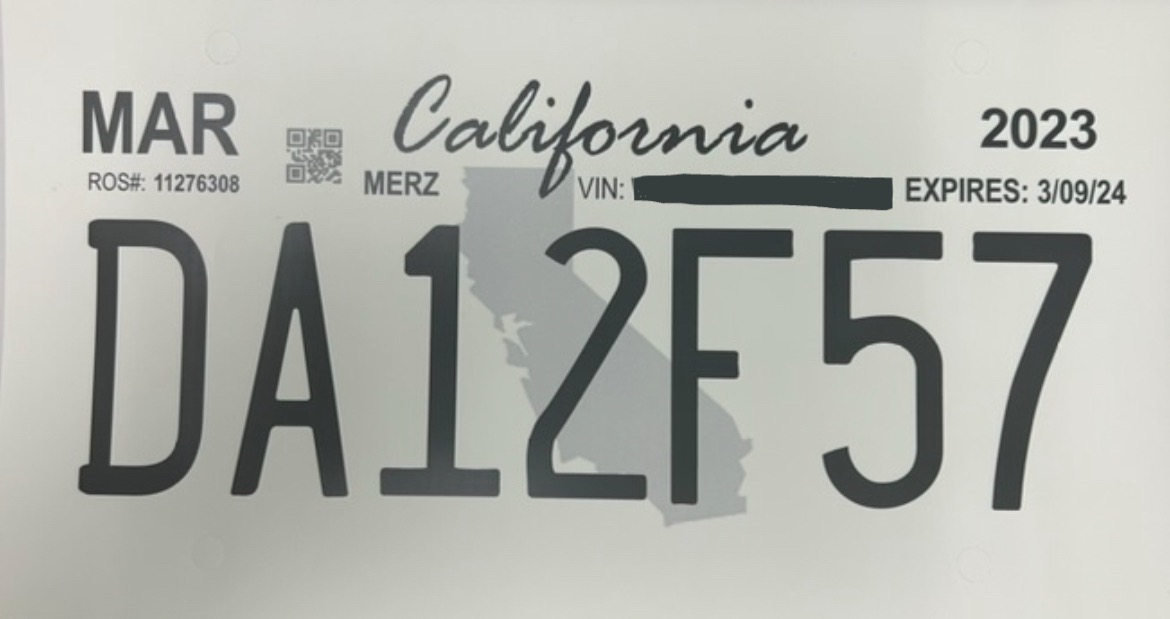
2023 California temporary license plate for a Mercedes-Benz GLB-250.

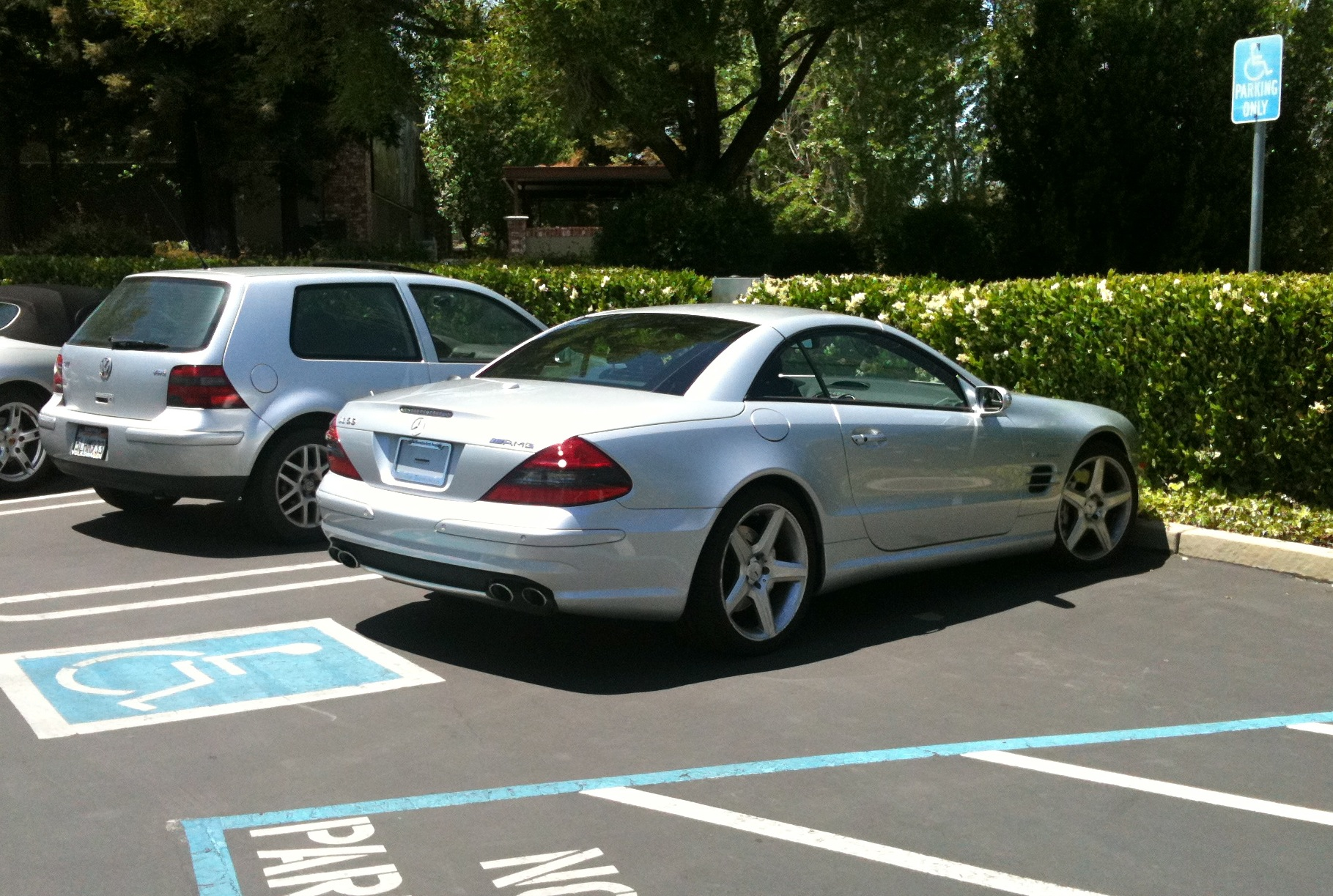
Steve Jobs' car, parked at Apple Infinite Loop campus in 2010.

Prior to 2019, California was the last U.S. state to not require the display of any form of temporary license plate on new vehicles. New motor vehicle dealers were still required to electronically report sales of new vehicles to the DMV, but they were only required to print out a DMV report-of-sale form on regular paper at the time of sale. The dealer was then only required to attach the DMV report-of-sale form to the inside of the car windshield in the lower right corner (from the driver's perspective). Before 2019, it was common for a newly purchased vehicle to be driven around for a month (or more) with nothing but a dealer's advertisement or logo on paper plate inserts in the mounting brackets where the owner was supposed to promptly install front and rear license plates when they arrived in the mail from the DMV.

California's lack of a temporary license plate requirement was mocked as the "Steve Jobs loophole," due to the Apple founder's habit of continuously signing a series of six-month leases of Mercedes-Benz SL55 AMGs on a rolling basis for the specific purpose of avoiding the state requirement of having to install permanent license plates on his cars. The DMV report-of-sale forms were printed in regular type not intended to be read at a distance, meaning that it was legible only to persons leaning closely over the windshield when the car was standing still. This made the new vehicle untraceable through casual visual observation by passerby (especially for the common car models and colors), as well as automated means such as license-plate reading systems, red light cameras, and automatic number plate recognition. Thus, drivers of newly purchased vehicles who deliberately failed to carry a FasTrak electronic toll collection transponder could evade toll collection (on tolled Express Lanes, toll bridges, and toll roads where a transponder system was used instead of toll booths), causing the state to lose $15–19 million per year. Vehicle owners who failed to immediately attach permanent metal license plates upon receipt might eventually get cited one way or another for that infraction, but there was no way at that point to retroactively link such vehicle owners to unpaid tolls. This loophole was also deliberately exploited by criminals, who knew that a car with dealer paper inserts was untraceable and in and of itself would not raise suspicion.

The hit-and-run death of a pedestrian who was struck by an unidentifiable car with dealer paper inserts sparked the enactment of new legislation in 2016 to require temporary license plates in California beginning in 2019. The DMV's reporting system was modified to enable dealers to print out temporary license plates on special paper, and dealers are now required to attach such temporary paper plates to a vehicle that does not already have license plates. The series that the temporary license plates use is AB12C34, and it applies to all newly purchased vehicles in the state of California since 2019.

== Sources ==
- CA Department of Motor Vehicles License Plate Introduction
- Other types of Specialty Plates
- California License Plate Data (1914–1962)
- Special Recognition Plates
- Legacy Plates
