= Vehicle registration plates of Texas =

Texas vehicle license plates

Texas
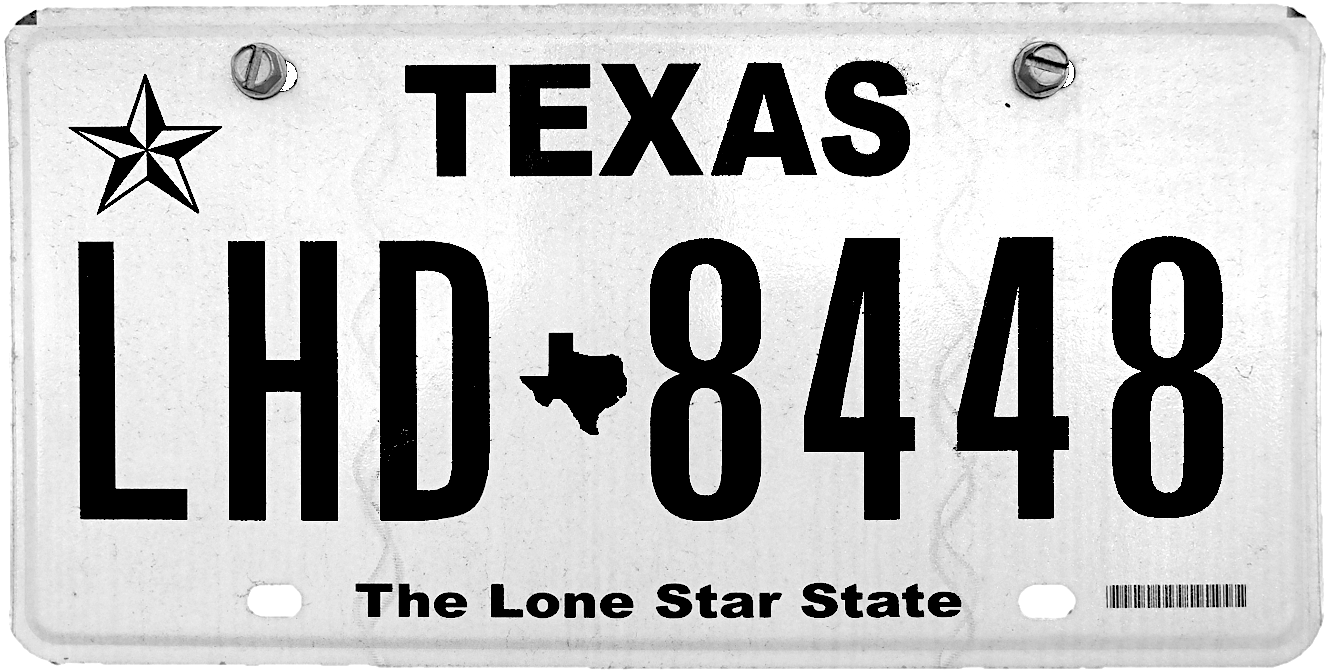

Current series
- Name: Texas Classic
- Slogan: The Lone Star State
- Size: 12 in × 6 in 30 cm × 15 cm
- Material: Aluminum
- Serial format: ABC-1234
- Introduced: July 2012

Availability
- Issued by: Texas Department of Motor Vehicles
- Manufactured by: Wynne Unit, Huntsville, Texas

History
- First issued: July 1, 1917 (pre-state plates from 1907 through June 30, 1917)

The U.S. state of Texas first required its residents to register their motor vehicles in 1907. Registrants provided their own license plates for display, with serial numbers assigned by their county of residence, until the state began to issue plates in 1917.

As of 2026, plates are manufactured at the Wynne Unit in Huntsville, Texas, and are issued by the Texas Department of Motor Vehicles (TxDMV). Front and rear plates are required for most classes of vehicles, while only rear plates are required for motorcycles, trailers and antique vehicles.

== Passenger baseplates ==
=== 1917 to 1974 ===
In 1956, the United States, Canada, and Mexico came to an agreement with the American Association of Motor Vehicle Administrators, the Automobile Manufacturers Association and the National Safety Council that standardized the size for license plates for vehicles (except those for motorcycles) at 6 inches (15 cm) in height by 12 inches (30 cm) in width, with standardized mounting holes. The first Texas license plate that complied with these standards was a modification of the 1955 plate, introduced towards the end of that year.

Image	Dates issued	Design	Slogan	Serial format	Serials issued	Notes
	1917–22	Embossed white serial on dark blue plate with border line; vertical "TEX" at right	none	123456	1 to approximately 767000	Validated for 1917, 1918 and 1919 with round seals, and for 1920, 1921 and 1922 with rectangular seals.
	1923–24	Embossed white serial with star separator on black plate with border line; vertical "TEXAS" at both left and right	none	123-456	1 to approximately 999-999	Validated for 1924 with rectangular seals.
	1925	Embossed white serial with star separator on maroon plate with border line; vertical "TEXAS" and "1925" at left and right respectively	none	123-456	1 to approximately 935–000	First dated plate.
	1926	Embossed black serial with star separator on gray plate with border line; vertical "TEX-26" at right	none	123-456	1 to approximately 997–000	
	1927	Embossed white serial with star separator on green plate with border line; vertical "1927" and "TEXAS" at left and right respectively	none	123-456	1 to 999-999	
	1927	Embossed white serial with star separator on green plate with border line; vertical "1927" and "TEXAS" at left and right respectively	none	A12-345	A00-000 to approximately A69-000	
	1928	Embossed white serial with star separator on dark brown plate with border line; vertical "TEX-28" at right; vertical "FRONT" or "REAR" at left	none	123-456; 1-234-567	1 to approximately 1–114–000	
	1929	Embossed orange serial with star separator on black plate with border line; "TEXAS–1929" centered at bottom; vertical "FRONT" or "REAR" at left	none	123-456; 1-234-567	1 to approximately 1–195–000	
	1930	Embossed dark blue serial with star separator on golden yellow plate with border line; "TEXAS–1930" centered at top; vertical "FRONT" or "REAR" at left	none	123-456; 1-234-567	1 to approximately 1–358–000	
	1931	Embossed white serial with star separator on black plate with border line; vertical "TEX" and "31" at right	none	1-2345	1 to 9–9999	
	1931	Embossed white serial with star separator on black plate with border line; vertical "TEX" and "31" at right	none	A1-2345	A0-0000 to approximately P5-0000	
	1932	Embossed white serial with star separator on green plate with border line; "TEXAS–1932" centered at bottom	none	123-456	1 to 999-999	Only letters A, F, K, N, V and Y used in the A12-345 serial format. This practice continued through 1944.
	1932	Embossed white serial with star separator on green plate with border line; "TEXAS–1932" centered at bottom	none	A12-345	A00-000 to approximately V19-000	Only letters A, F, K, N, V and Y used in the A12-345 serial format. This practice continued through 1944.
	1933	Embossed orange serial with star separator on white plate with border line; "TEXAS–1933" centered at top	none	123-456	1 to 999-999	
	1933	Embossed orange serial with star separator on white plate with border line; "TEXAS–1933" centered at top	none	A12-345	A00-000 to approximately F90-000	
	1934	Embossed black serial with star separator on orange plate with border line; "TEXAS – 1934" centered at bottom	none	123-456	1 to 999-999	
	1934	Embossed black serial with star separator on orange plate with border line; "TEXAS – 1934" centered at bottom	none	A12-345	A00-000 to approximately F35-000	
	1935	Embossed white serial with star separator on maroon plate with border line; "TEXAS–1935" centered at top	none	123-456	1 to 999-999	
	1935	Embossed white serial with star separator on maroon plate with border line; "TEXAS–1935" centered at top	none	A12-345	A00-000 to approximately F64-000	
	1936	Embossed dark blue serial on lemon yellow plate with border line; vertical "TEX" used as separator; "19" at bottom left and "36" at bottom right	"CENTENNIAL" centered at bottom	123-456	1 to 999-999	Commemorated the 100th anniversary of the creation of the Republic of Texas.
	1936	Embossed dark blue serial on lemon yellow plate with border line; vertical "TEX" used as separator; "19" at bottom left and "36" at bottom right	"CENTENNIAL" centered at bottom	A12-345	A00-000 to approximately K31-000	Commemorated the 100th anniversary of the creation of the Republic of Texas.
	1937	Embossed ivory serial with star separator on black plate with border line; "TEXAS–1937" centered at top	none	123-456	1 to 999-999	
	1937	Embossed ivory serial with star separator on black plate with border line; "TEXAS–1937" centered at top	none	A12-345	A00-000 to approximately K83-000	
	1938	Embossed black serial with star separator on white plate with border line; "TEXAS–1938" centered at bottom	none	123-456	1 to 999-999	
	1938	Embossed black serial with star separator on white plate with border line; "TEXAS–1938" centered at bottom	none	A12-345	A00-000 to approximately K88-000	
	1939	Embossed dark purple serial with star separator on golden yellow plate; "TEXAS 1939" at top	none	123-456	1 to 999-999	
	1939	Embossed dark purple serial with star separator on golden yellow plate; "TEXAS 1939" at top	none	A12-345	A00-000 to approximately N18-000	
	1940	Embossed dark purple serial with star separator on white plate; "19 TEXAS 40" at top	none	123-456	1 to 999-999	
	1940	Embossed dark purple serial with star separator on white plate; "19 TEXAS 40" at top	none	A12-345	A00-000 to approximately V06-000	
	1941	Embossed golden yellow serial with star separator on black plate; "TEXAS 1941" at top	none	123-456	1 to 999-999	
	1941	Embossed golden yellow serial with star separator on black plate; "TEXAS 1941" at top	none	A12-345	A00-000 to approximately V70-000	
	1942–44	Embossed black serial with star separator on golden yellow plate; "TEXAS-42" at bottom	none	123-456	1 to 999-999	Revalidated for 1943 with black tabs, and for 1944 with green tabs, due to metal conservation for World War II.
	1942–44	Embossed black serial with star separator on golden yellow plate; "TEXAS-42" at bottom	none	A12-345	A00-000 to approximately Y79-000	Revalidated for 1943 with black tabs, and for 1944 with green tabs, due to metal conservation for World War II.
	1945	Embossed black serial on golden yellow plate; "TEXAS-45" at top, offset to right	none	A/B1234	A/A10 to approximately H/L4000	
	1946	Embossed cream serial on black plate; "TEXAS-46" at top, offset to right	none	A/B1234	A/A10 to approximately J/B7000	
	1947	Embossed white serial on black plate; "TEXAS-47" at bottom, offset to right	none	A/B1234	A/A10 to approximately J/U7000	
	1948	Embossed golden yellow serial on black plate; "TEXAS-48" at top, offset to right	none	A/B1234	A/A10 to approximately K/U7000	
	1949	Embossed black serial on golden yellow plate; "TEXAS-49" at bottom, offset to right	none	A/B1234	A/A10 to approximately L/Y8000	
	1950	Embossed golden yellow serial on black plate; "TEXAS-50" at top, offset to right	none	A/B1234	A/A10 to L/Z9999; U/A10 to approximately U/E3000	
	1951	Embossed black serial on golden yellow plate; "TEXAS-51" at top, offset to right	none	A/B1234	A/A10 to L/Z9999; U/A10 to approximately U/R8000	
	1952	As 1950 base, but with "TEXAS 52" at top	none	A/B1234	A/A10 to approximately P/J2000	
	1953	As 1951 base, but with "TEXAS 53" at top	none	A/B1234	A/A10 to approximately P/J4000	
	1954	As 1950 base, but with "TEXAS 54" at top	none	A/B1234	A/A10 to approximately P/X9000	
	1955	As 1951 base, but with "TEXAS 55" at top	none	A/B1234	A/A10 to approximately R/E9999	
	1955	As above, but to 6" x 12" size, and with "TEXAS 55" centered at top	none	AB1234	RF10 to approximately SD3000	
	1956	Embossed golden yellow serial on black plate; "TEXAS 56" centered at top	none	AB1234	AA10 to approximately SV6000	
	1957	Embossed black serial with star separator on white plate; "TEXAS 57" centered at top	none	AB-1234	AA-10 to approximately UR-3000	
	1958	Embossed white serial with star separator on black plate; "TEXAS 58" centered at top	none	AB-1234	AA-10 to approximately TT-6000	
	1959	As 1957 base, but with "TEXAS 59" centered at top	none	AB-1234	AA-10 to approximately UK-3000	
	1960	As 1958 base, but with "TEXAS 60" centered at top	none	AB-1234	AA-10 to approximately UN-7000	
	1961	Embossed black serial with star separator on white plate; "TEXAS" centered at top; "61" at top right	none	AB-1234	AA-10 to approximately UY-9000	
	1962	Embossed white serial with star separator on black plate; "TEXAS" centered at top; "62" at top right	none	AB-1234	AA-10 to approximately VZ-4000	
	1963	Embossed black serial with star separator on white plate; "TEXAS" and "1963" centered at top and bottom respectively	none	AB-1234	AA-10 to approximately WS-7000	
	1964	Embossed white serial with star separator on black plate; "TEXAS" and "1964" centered at top and bottom respectively	none	AB-1234	AA-10 to approximately YT-1000	
	1965	Embossed black serial on white plate; "19 TEXAS 65" at top	none	ABC 123	BBB 10 to approximately PHG 999	Vowels and Q not used in serials; this practice continued through 1974.
	1966	Embossed white serial with star separator on black plate; "19 TEXAS 66" at top	none	ABC-123	BBB-10 to approximately PYK-999	
	1967	Embossed black serial with star separator on white plate; "19 TEXAS 67" at top	none	ABC-123	BBB-10 to approximately RKN-999	
	1968	Embossed white serial with star separator on black plate; "TEXAS" centered at top; "68" at bottom left and bottom right	"HEMISFAIR" centered at bottom	ABC-123	BBB-10 to approximately RSM-999	
	1969	Embossed black serial with star separator on reflective white plate; "19 TEXAS 69" at top	none	ABC-123	BBB-10 to approximately RWV-999	
	1970	Embossed blue serial with star separator on reflective white plate; "19 TEXAS 70" at top	none	ABC-123	BBB-10 to approximately SDN-999	
	1971	Embossed black serial with star separator on reflective white plate; "TEXAS 71" at top, offset to right	none	ABC-123	BBB-10 to approximately SWD-999	
	1972	Embossed green serial with star separator on reflective white plate; "19 TEXAS 72" at top	none	ABC-123	BBB-10 to approximately TKK-999	
	1973	Embossed black serial with star separator on reflective white plate; "19 TEXAS 73" at top	none	ABC-123	BBB-10 to approximately VDD-999	
	1974	Embossed red serial with star separator on reflective white plate; "19 TEXAS 74" at top	none	ABC-123	BBB-10 to approximately VMG-999	

=== 1975 to present ===
Image	Dates issued	Design	Slogan	Serial format	Serials issued	Notes
	1975	Black on reflective white, star separator	none	ABC-123	AAA-10 to approximately MMV-500	Letters I and O not used in serials; this practice continued until 1990. Monthly staggered registration introduced 1978.
	1976–81	As above, but with state-shaped separator	none	ABC-123	MMV-501 to ZZZ-999	Letters I and O not used in serials; this practice continued until 1990. Monthly staggered registration introduced 1978.
	1982–84	As above, but with state-shaped separator	none	123-ABC	001-AAA to 999-HEW	Letters I and O not used in serials; this practice continued until 1990. Monthly staggered registration introduced 1978.
	1985–86	Dark blue on reflective white, screened red state-shaped separator	Sesquicentennial	123-ABC	001-HEX to 974-PAY	Commemorated the 150th anniversary of the creation of the Republic of Texas.
	1986–89	As above, but with bolder state name	none	123-ABC	975-PAY to 999-ZZZ	
	1990	As above, but with bolder state name	none	ABC-12D	BBB-01B to BKW-99Z	Vowels and Q not used in serials (as from 1965 to 1974); this practice continues today.
	1990–91	Dark blue and red on reflective white, state flag screened to left of state name	none	ABC-12D	BKX-01B to GTX-99Z	
	1992 – December 28, 1995	Dark blue and red on reflective white, state flag screened to left of state name	The Lone Star State	ABC-12D	GTY-01B to TKT-99Z	
	December 29, 1995 – mid 1996	State outline within abstract graphic.	150 Years of Statehood	ABC-12D	VJL-01K to WSJ-99F	Awarded "Plate of the Year" for best new standard-issue license plate of 1995 by the Automobile License Plate Collectors Association, the first and, to date, only time Texas has been so honored. Co-recipient with Pennsylvania.
	mid 1996 – February 1998	As 1990–95 base	The Lone Star State	ABC-12D	TKV-01B to VJL-99J; WSJ-01G to ZZZ-99Z	Some late 'Z' series plates made on next series' graphic sheeting, with state flag to right of state name.
	February 1998 – mid 2000	As above, but with state flag to right of state name	The Lone Star State	A12-BCD	B01-BBB to J99-GPZ	Some early 'B' series plates made on previous series' graphic sheeting, with state flag to left of state name. Sticker wells at top removed in late 1998, near the end of the 'C' series (plates were validated with windshield stickers from 1994 onwards). Issued concurrently with the Space Shuttle base (below) from February 2000 until supplies were exhausted.
	February 2000 – November 2004	Dark blue serial on reflective plate with graphic scene featuring a cowboy, oil fields, a Space Shuttle, stars and the moon; screened red state-shaped separator	The Lone Star State	A12-BCD	J01-GRB to Z99-ZZZ	
	November 2004 – October 2005	Dark blue serial on reflective plate with graphic scene featuring a cowboy, oil fields, a Space Shuttle, stars and the moon; screened red state-shaped separator	The Lone Star State	123-ABC	001-BBB to 999-HWL	
	October 2005 – September 2007	As above, but with a slightly smaller cowboy, the state flag added within the state-shaped separator, the national flag added to the Space Shuttle, and seven larger stars above the shuttle	The Lone Star State	123-ABC	001-HWM to 999-ZZZ	The seven larger stars honored the astronauts killed in the Space Shuttle Columbia disaster of 2003, which occurred over Texas.
	September 2007 – June; 2009	As above, but with a slightly smaller cowboy, the state flag added within the state-shaped separator, the national flag added to the Space Shuttle, and seven larger stars above the shuttle	The Lone Star State	ABC-123	BBB-001 to approximately VLZ-999	The seven larger stars honored the astronauts killed in the Space Shuttle Columbia disaster of 2003, which occurred over Texas.
	July; 2009 – June; 2012	First standard-issue non-embossed license plate issued in Texas; features the Davis Mountains against a sky backdrop, with a lone star and streaks of red and blue in the upper-left corner; state motto is retained on the bottom	The Lone Star State	AB1-C234	BB1-B001 to approximately DZ9-Z999	
	July; 2012 – present	Black lettering on white sheeting design with double security thread in the sheeting	The Lone Star State	ABC-1234	BBB-0001 to YNH-7978 (as of Aug 4, 2026)	Known as the "Texas Classic" plate. Serials issued on both passenger vehicles and trucks.

== Non-passenger plates ==
Image	Type	First issued	Design	Slogan	Serial format	Serials issued	Notes
	Apportioned Tractor	2013	As "Texas Classic" passenger base; "APPORTIONED" between state name and serial	The Lone Star State	R12-3456	R00-0001 to present	
	Apportioned Truck/Bus	2013	As "Texas Classic" passenger base; "APPORTIONED" between state name and serial	The Lone Star State	K12-3456	K00-0001 to present	
	Disabled	1986	Embossed dark blue on reflective white; "TEXAS" in red centered at top	none	1AB CD	1BB BB to approximately 9WT MZ	
	Disabled	2005	Screened dark blue on reflective white; state flag within state shape at top right; "TEXAS" in blue centered at top	The Lone Star State	1AB CD	1WT NB to approximately 9YP ZZ	
	Disabled	2007	Screened dark blue on reflective white; state flag within state shape at top right; "TEXAS" in blue centered at top	The Lone Star State	1ABCD	1YTBB to 9ZZZZ; 1BBBB to approximately 9HZZZ	
	Disabled	2013	As "Texas Classic" passenger base	The Lone Star State	1ABCD	1JBBB to present	
	Exempt	1969	Embossed black on white with star separator; "TEXAS" and "EXEMPT" centered at top and bottom respectively	none	123-456	160-001 to approximately 250–000	
	Exempt	1975	Embossed black on white with star separator; "TEXAS" centered at top; "EXEMPT" between state name and serial	none	123-456	250-001 to approximately 285–000	
	Exempt	c. 1977	As above, but with state-shaped separator	none	123-456	285-001 to approximately 556–000	
	Exempt	c. 1988	As above, but elements dark blue rather than black	none	123-456	556-001 to approximately 831–000	
	Exempt	c. 2000	Embossed dark blue on reflective white with screened red state-shaped separator; "TEXAS" in red centered at top; "EXEMPT" in dark blue between state name and serial	none	123-456	831-001 to approximately 850–000	
	Exempt	c. 2003	Screened dark blue on reflective white; "TEXAS" in dark blue centered at top; "EXEMPT" in red between state name and serial	none	123-456	850-001 to 899-999 200–001 to approx. 299–999	
	Exempt	2006	Screened dark blue on reflective white; "TEXAS" in dark blue centered at top; "EXEMPT" in red between state name and serial	none	123-4567	100-0000 to approximately 117–9999	
	Exempt	2014	As "Texas Classic" passenger base; "EXEMPT" between state name and serial	The Lone Star State	123-4567	118-0000 to present	
	Truck	1975	Embossed black on white with star separator; "TEXAS" centered at top; "TRUCK" between state name and serial	none	AB-1234	AA-10 to approximately HQ-5200	
	Truck	1975	As above, but with state-shaped separator	none	AB-1234	HQ-5201 to ZZ-9999	
	Truck	1983	As above, but with state-shaped separator	none	1234-AB	100-AA to 9999-CQ	
	Truck	1985	As 1985 Sesquicentennial passenger base; "TRUCK" between state name and serial	Sesquicentennial	123-4AB	000-1CR to 299-9KK	
	Truck	1986	As above, but without slogan and years	none	123-4AB	300-0KK to 999-9ZZ	
	Truck	1991	As above, but without slogan and years	none	AB1-234	AA0-001 to ZZ9-999	
	Truck	1997	As above, but without slogan and years	none	1AB-C23	1BB-B01 to 4LL-Z99	
	Truck	2000	As Space Shuttle passenger base; "TRUCK" between state name and serial	The Lone Star State	1AB-C23	4LM-B01 to 9ZZ-Z99	
	Truck	2004	As Space Shuttle passenger base; "TRUCK" between state name and serial	The Lone Star State	12A-BC3	01B-BB1 to 99L-XZ3	
	Truck	2005	As revised Space Shuttle passenger base; "TRUCK" between state name and serial	The Lone Star State	12A-BC3	01L-YB3 to 99Z-ZZ9	
	Truck	2009	As revised Space Shuttle passenger base; "TRUCK" between state name and serial	The Lone Star State	123-4AB	000-1AA to approximately 500-0BF	
	Truck	2009	As sky passenger base; "TRUCK" between state name and serial	The Lone Star State	AB1-2345	AA0-0001 to approximately CB1-0000	

== Temporary tags ==
Temporary tags are issued to unregistered vehicles and to vehicles registered in states that do not have a reciprocity agreement with Texas. These tags are printed on paper and are used mainly by dealers. As of 2022, four types are available: three are valid for 72 hours, 144 hours, and 30 days respectively; the fourth is the "one-trip" tag, which is issued only to unladen vehicles traveling from a single origin to a single destination (either of which must be in Texas) and is valid for 15 days.

In February 2022, it was reported that as many as 1.2 million fraudulent temporary Texas tags were sold in the United States in 2021. Due to inadequate security standards in the dealer application process in Texas, fraudulent individuals posing as dealers could purchase licenses for less than $800. This gave them access to the Texas DMV database, which they could use to print temporary tags and sell them online for profit. Most drivers who purchased the tags did so to make their vehicles untraceable when committing crimes, or to avoid paying tolls and registration fees.

== Optional plates ==
Texas has more specialty plates than any other state, with 506 available.

Image	Type	First issued	Design	Slogan	Notes
	4-H Club				
	A Fine Cause				
	Adopt-A-Beach				
	Aerospace Commission				
	Air Force Association				
	Animal Friendly				
	Be A Blood Donor				
	Be An Organ Donor				
	Big Bend National Park				
	Boy Scouts (Scouts BSA)				
	Buffalo Soldier Museum				
	Cancer Survivor				
	Columbia Remembered				
	Conquer Cancer				
	Dallas Cowboys				
	Dallas Mavericks				
	Don't Tread On Me				
	Emergency Medical Services				
	Enjoy Texas Music				
	Fight Terrorism				
	God Bless America				
	God Bless Texas				
	Houston Texans				
	Hunt Texas				
	In God We Trust				
	Kansas Jayhawks				
	Keep Texas Beautiful				
	Knights of Columbus				
	March of Dimes				
	Master Gardener				
	Mission Valley				
	Mothers Against Drunk Driving				
	NASCAR				Discontinued
	Native Texan				
	Oil and Gas				
	Olympic Spirit				
	Proud For Kids				
	Realtor				
	Rifle Association				
	Rotary Club				
	Save Water, Texas!				
	Share the Road				
	State Parks				
	Southern Methodist University				
	Stop Child Abuse				
	Texas Pride				
	Texas Trees				
	Trails!				
	United States Air Force				
	United We Stand				
	YMCA				
