= Vehicle registration plates of the United States for 1955 =

1955 license plates in the United States

Vehicle registration plates of the United States by year
| Vehicle registration plates of the United States for 1954 | Events of 1955 | Vehicle registration plates of the United States for 1956 |

Each of the 48 states of the United States of America plus several of its territories and the District of Columbia issued individual passenger license plates for 1955.

== Passenger baseplates ==
Passenger Car Plates
| Image | Region | Design | Slogan | Serial format | Serials issued | Notes |
|---|---|---|---|---|---|---|
| | Alabama | | | | | |
| | Alaska | | | | | |
| | American Samoa | | | | | |
| | Arizona | | | | | |
| | Arkansas | | | | | |
| | California | | | | | |
| | Canal Zone | | | | | |
| | Colorado | | | | | |
| | Connecticut | | | | | |
| | Delaware | | | | | |
| | District of Columbia | | | | | |
| | Florida | | | | | |
| | Georgia | | | | | |
| | Guam | | | | | |
| | Hawaii | | | | | |
| | Idaho | | | | | |
| | Illinois | | | | | |
| | Indiana | | | | | |
| | Iowa | | | | | |
| | Kansas | Embossed white serial on black state-shaped plate with border line; "KANSAS 55" centered at top | "THE WHEAT STATE" centered at bottom | AB-1234 | Coded by county of issuance (A/B) | |
| | Kentucky | | | | | |
| | Louisiana | Embossed white serial with pelican separator on black plate with border line; "LOUISIANA 1955" at bottom | none | 123 456 | 1 001 to approximately 740 000 | |
| | Maine | | | | | |
| | Maryland | | | | | |
| | Massachusetts | | | | | |
| | Michigan | | | | | |
| | Minnesota | | | | | |
| | Mississippi | | | | | |
| | Missouri | | | | | |
| | Montana | | | | | |
| | Nebraska | | | | | |
| | Nevada | | | | | |
| | New Hampshire | | | | | |
| | New Jersey | | | | | |
| | New Mexico | | | | | |
| | New York | | | | | |
| | North Carolina | | | | | |
| | North Dakota | | | | | |
| | Northern Mariana; Islands | | | | | |
| | Ohio | | | | | |
| | Oklahoma | Embossed white serial on black plate with border line; "55" at top right | "VISIT OKLAHOMA" at top, offset to left | 1-12345; 1-A1234; 10-1234; 10-A123 | | County-coded (1 or 10) |
| | Oregon | | | | | |
| | Pennsylvania | | | | | |
| | Puerto Rico | | | | | |
| | Rhode Island | | | | | |
| | South Carolina | | | | | |
| | South Dakota | | | | | Letters appear along with the numbers in larger counties. |
| | Tennessee | | | | | |
| | Texas | | | | | |
| | Utah | | | | | |
| | Vermont | | | | | |
| | Virginia | | | | | |
| | Washington | | | | | |
| | West Virginia | | | | | |
| | Wisconsin | Embossed green serial on white plate; "WIS" at top left, month of expiration and "55" at top right, slogan at bottom | AMERICA'S DAIRYLAND | A12-345 | Coded by month of expiration (A) | |
| | Wyoming | | | | | |

== Non-passenger plates ==
Non-passenger Plates
| Image (standard) | Region | Type | Design & Slogan | Serial format | Serials issued | Notes |
|---|---|---|---|---|---|---|
| | Maryland | Temporary | | | | |
| | Wisconsin | Bus | Embossed black serial on orange plate; "WIS" at top left, "BUS" at top right; "55" at bottom left | A 12 | Coded by weight class (A) | |
| | Wisconsin | Dealer | Embossed black serial on cream plate; "WIS" at top left, "55" at top right; "DEALER" at bottom | A 1234 | Dealer number and plate number | Number is the dealer number, letters increment every time a new plate is issued to that specific dealer |
| | Wisconsin | Disabled veteran | Unknown format | | | |
| | Wisconsin | Farm | Embossed yellow serial on blue plate; "EXP" at top left, "DEC 55" at top right; "WIS FARM" at bottom | 12345 | 1 to approximately 96000 | |
| | Wisconsin | Heavy farm | Embossed yellow serial on blue plate; "EXP" at top left, "DEC 55" at top right | A 1234 | Coded by weight class (A) | Issued to farm trucks over 10,000lbs. |
| | Wisconsin | In transit | Embossed black serial on cream plate; "WIS" at top left, "55" at top right; "IN TRANSIT" at bottom | AB 12 | Transporter number and plate number | Number is the transporter number, letters increment every time a new plate is issued to that particular transporter |
| | Wisconsin | Manufacturer | Embossed black serial on cream plate; "WIS" at top left, "55" at top right; "MANUFACTURER" at bottom | AB 12 | Manufacturer number and plate number | Number is the manufacturer number, letters increment every time a new plate is issued to that particular manufacturer |
| | Wisconsin | Mobile home | Embossed white serial on green plate; "EXP" at top left, "DEC 55" at top right; "WIS MOBILE HOME" at bottom | 1234 | 1 to approximately 6500 | Recaptioned from "cabin" in 1955 |
| | Wisconsin | Motorcycle | Embossed white serial on maroon plate with border line; "A WIS 55" at top | 1234 | 1 to approximately 8250 | |
| | Wisconsin | Motorcycle sidecar | Embossed white serial on maroon plate with border line; "B WIS 55" at top | 123 | 1 to approximately 125 | |
| | Wisconsin | Motorcycle dealer | Embossed black serial on cream plate with border line; "WIS 1955" at top, vertical stacked "DLR" at right | AB1, A12 | Dealer number and plate number | Number is the dealer number, letters increment every time a new plate is issued to that specific dealer |
| | Wisconsin | Municipal | Embossed white serial on black plate; "WIS" at top left, "55" at top right; "MUNICIPAL" at bottom | 12345 | 1 to approximately 13000 | |
| | Wisconsin | Municipal motorcycle | Embossed white serial on black plate with border line; format unknown | M123 | M 1 to unknown | |
| | Wisconsin | Official | Embossed white serial on black plate; "WIS" at top left, "55" at top right; "OFFICIAL" at bottom | 123 | 1 to approximately 700 | |
| | Wisconsin | School bus | Embossed black serial on orange plate; "WIS" at top left, "SCH" at top right; "55" at bottom left, quarterly tab at far right | A 12 | Coded by weight class (A) | |
| | Wisconsin | Special-X | Embossed white serial on black plate; "WIS" at top left, "55" at top right | 123 X | 1 X to approximately 150 X | |
| | Wisconsin | Tax only | Embossed black serial on orange plate; "WIS" at top left, "55" at bottom left; quarterly tab at far right | 123 | 1 to unknown (244 high) | |
| | Wisconsin | Tractor | Embossed black serial on orange plate; "WIS" at top left, "55" at bottom left; "TRACTOR" at bottom, quarterly tab at far right | A 123, AB123 | Coded by weight class (A)/(AB) | |
| | Wisconsin | Light trailer | Embossed white serial on green plate; "EXP" at top left, "DEC 55" at top right; "WIS TRAILER" at bottom | A 1234 | Coded by weight class (A) | |
| | Wisconsin | Heavy trailer | Embossed black serial on orange plate; "WIS" at top left, "TRL" at top right; "55" at bottom left, quarterly tab at far right | A 123 | Coded by weight class (A) | Weight classes are E, F, G, H, J, K, L, M, N, R, S, T, V, X, and Y. Also issued to light trailers for hire in the A, B, C, and D weight classes. |
| | Wisconsin | Commercial semi-trailer | Embossed black serial on orange plate; "EXP" at top left, "JUN 55" at top right; "WIS SEMI-TRAILER" at bottom | CS 1234 | CS 1 to approximately CS 6000 | |
| | Wisconsin | Private semi-trailer | Embossed black serial on orange plate; "EXP" at top left, "JUN 55" at top right; "WIS SEMI-TRAILER" at bottom | PS 1234 | PS 1 to approximately PS 1500 | |
| | Wisconsin | Trailer dealer | Embossed black serial on cream plate; "WIS" at top left, "55" at top right; "DEALER" at bottom | A 12 TL | Dealer number and plate number | Number is the dealer number, prefix letters increment every time a new plate is issued to that specific dealer |
| | Wisconsin | Light truck | Embossed white serial on green plate; "EXP" at top left, "DEC 55" at top right; "WIS TRUCK" at bottom | A12-345 | Coded by weight class (A). Serials start at A25-001 | Weight classes are A, B, C, and D |
| | Wisconsin | Heavy truck | Embossed black serial on orange plate; "WIS" at top left, "TRK" at top right; "55" at bottom left, quarterly tab at far right | A1234 | Coded by weight class (A) | Weight classes are E, F, G, H, J, K, L, M, N, R, S, T, V, and X. Also issued to light trucks for hire in the A, B, C, and D weight classes. |

== See also ==
- Antique vehicle registration
- Electronic license plate
- Motor vehicle registration
- Vehicle license
