= Vehicle registration plates of the United States for 1923 =

1923 license plates in the United States

Vehicle registration plates of the United States by year
| Vehicle registration plates of the United States for 1922 | Events of 1923 | Vehicle registration plates of the United States for 1924 |

Each of the 48 states of the United States plus several of its territories and the District of Columbia issued individual passenger license plates for 1923.

== Passenger baseplates ==
Passenger car plates
| Image | Region | Design | Slogan | Serial format | Serials issued | Notes |
|---|---|---|---|---|---|---|
| | Alabama | | | | | |
| | Alaska | | | | | |
| | American Samoa | | | | | Territory issued plates begin in 1924. |
| | Arizona | | | | | |
| | Arkansas | | | | | |
| | California | | | | | |
| | Canal Zone | | | | | |
| | Colorado | | | | | |
| | Connecticut | | | | | |
| | Delaware | | | | | |
| | District of Columbia | | | | | |
| | Florida | | | | | |
| | Georgia | | | | | |
| | Guam | | | | | |
| | Hawai'i | | | | | |
| | Idaho | | | | | |
| | Illinois | | | | | |
| | Indiana | | | | | |
| | Iowa | | | | | |
| | Kansas | | | | | |
| | Kentucky | | | | | |
| | Louisiana | | | | | |
| | Maine | | | | | |
| | Maryland | | | | | |
| | Massachusetts | | | | | |
| | Michigan | | | | | |
| | Minnesota | | | | | |
| | Mississippi | | | | | |
| | Missouri | | | | | |
| | Montana | | | | | |
| | Nebraska | | | | | |
| | Nevada | | | | | |
| | New Hampshire | | | | | |
| | New Jersey | | | | | |
| | New Mexico | | | | | |
| | New York | | | | | |
| | North Carolina | Embossed white serial on green plate with border line; vertical "NC" at right and "6-30-23" centered at bottom | none | 123456 | 1 to approximately 181000 | |
| | North Dakota | | | | | |
| | Northern Mariana; Islands | | | | | |
| | Ohio | | | | | |
| | Oklahoma | | | | | |
| | Oregon | | | | | |
| | Pennsylvania | | | | | |
| | Puerto Rico | | | | | |
| | Rhode Island | | | | | |
| | South Carolina | | | | | |
| | South Dakota | | | | | |
| | Tennessee | | | | | |
| | Texas | | | | | |
| | 1923 | White on red with border line; slanted "UTAH" and "1923" at left | none | 12-345 | 8-501 to approximately 65-000 | First use of the full state name. Secretary of State, dealer, truck and trailer plate serials same as 1922. |
| | Vermont | | | | | |
| | Virginia | | | | | |
| | Washington | | | | | |
| | West Virginia | | | | | |
| | Wisconsin | Embossed red serial on white plate; vertical "WIS" over "23" at right | none | 123-456 | 1 to approximately 420-000 | |
| | Wyoming | | | | | |

== Non-passenger plates ==
Non-passenger Plates
| Image (standard) | Region | Type | Design & Slogan | Serial format | Serials issued | Notes |
|---|---|---|---|---|---|---|
| | Wisconsin | Dealer | Embossed red serial on white plate; vertical "WIS" over "23" at right; embossed solid star at left | 1234A | Dealer number and plate number | The number is the dealer number, the letter is the plate number for that dealer. |
| | Wisconsin | Motorcycle | Embossed red serial on white plate; "W" over "23" at right | 1234 | 1 to approximately 2200 | |
| | Wisconsin | Truck | Embossed red serial on white plate; vertical "WIS" over "23" at right; vertical "TRUCK" at left | 12-345 | 1 to approximately 24-000 | |
| | Wisconsin | Truck | Embossed red serial on white plate; vertical "WIS" over "23" at right; vertical "TRUCK" at left | A123 | Coded by weight class | Weight classes were added to trucks in late 1923; weight classes are A, B, C, D, E, and F |

== See also ==
- Antique vehicle registration
- Electronic license plate
- Motor vehicle registration
- Vehicle license
