= Vehicle registration plates of the United States for 1953 =

1953 license plates in the United States

Vehicle registration plates of the United States by year
Vehicle registration plates of the United States for 1952	Events of 1953	Vehicle registration plates of the United States for 1954

Each of the 48 states of the United States of America plus several of its territories and the District of Columbia issued individual passenger license plates for 1953.

== Passenger baseplates ==
Passenger Car Plates
Image	Region	Design	Slogan	Serial format	Serials issued	Notes
	Alabama					
	Alaska					
	American Samoa					
	Arizona					
	Arkansas					
	California					
	Canal Zone					
	Colorado					
	Connecticut					
	Delaware					
	District of Columbia					
	Florida					
	Georgia					
	Guam					
	Hawai'i					
	Idaho					
	Illinois					
	Indiana					
	Iowa					
	Kansas	Embossed white serial on dark blue state-shaped plate with border line; "KANSAS 51" centered at top; Yellow 1953 renewal tab over date	"THE WHEAT STATE" centered at bottom	AB-1234	Coded by county of issuance (A/B)	
	Kentucky					
	Louisiana	Embossed yellow serial with pelican separator on green plate with border line; "LOUISIANA-1953" at bottom	none	1 234; 12 345; 123 456	1-001 to approximately 638-000	
	Maine					
	Maryland					
	Massachusetts					
	Michigan					
	Minnesota					
	Mississippi					
	Missouri					
	Montana					
	Nebraska	Black on golden yellow; "NEBRASKA 52" at bottom	none	1-12345; 10-12345	Coded by county of issuance (1 or 10)	Black 1953 tab on 1952 base plate.
	Nevada					
	New Hampshire					
	New Jersey					
	New Mexico					
	New York					
	North Carolina					
	North Dakota					
	Northern Mariana; Islands					
	Ohio					
	Oklahoma					
	Oregon					
	Pennsylvania					
	Puerto Rico	Embossed black serial number on yellow background; black 1953–54 at top and Puerto Rico at bottom both embossed	none	12-345; 123-456		
	Rhode Island					
	South Carolina	Embossed black lettering on yellow base. "SOUTH CAROLINA 53" at top.	none	A-12-345		Coded by weight class (A)
	South Dakota					
	Tennessee					
	Texas					
	Utah					
	Vermont					
	Virginia					
	Washington					
	West Virginia					
	Wisconsin	Embossed black serial on yellow plate; "WIS" at top left, month of expiration and "53" at top right; slogan at bottom	AMERICA'S DAIRYLAND	A12-345	Coded by month of expiration (A)	
	Wyoming					

== Non-passenger plates ==
Non-passenger Plates
Image (standard)	Region	Type	Design & Slogan	Serial format	Serials issued	Notes
	Wisconsin	Bus	Embossed white serial on dark blue plate; "WIS" at top left, "BUS" at top right; "53" at bottom left, quarterly tab at right	A 12	Coded by weight class (A)	
	Wisconsin	Cabin	Embossed black serial on orange plate; "EXP" at top left, "DEC 52" at top right; "WIS CABIN" at bottom	1234	1 to approximately 5100	Revalidated for 1953 with black on yellow tabs
	Wisconsin	Dealer	Embossed white serial on red plate; "WIS" at top left, "53" at top right; "DEALER" at bottom	A 1234	Dealer number and plate number	Number is the dealer number, letters increment every time a new plate is issued to that specific dealer
	Wisconsin	Disabled veteran	Unknown format			
	Wisconsin	Farm	Embossed black serial on bare aluminum plate; "EXP" at top left, "DEC 52" at top right; "WIS FARM" at bottom	12-345	1 to approximately 90-000	Revalidated for 1953 with black on orange tabs
	Wisconsin	Heavy farm	Embossed black serial on bare aluminum plate; "EXP" at top left, "DEC 52" at top right; "WIS FARM" at bottom	A 1234	Coded by weight class (A)	Revalidated for 1953 with black on orange tabs. Weight classes are F, G, H, J, K, L, M, N, R, and S. Issued to farm trucks in excess of 12,000lbs.
	Wisconsin	In transit	Embossed white serial on red plate; "WIS" at top left, "53" at top right; "IN TRANSIT" at bottom	AB 12	Transporter number and plate number	Number is the transporter number, letters increment every time a new plate is issued to that specific transporter
	Wisconsin	Manufacturer	Embossed white serial on red plate; "WIS" at top left, "53" at top right; "MANUFACTURER" at bottom	AB 12	Manufacturer number and plate number	Number is the manufacturer number, letters increment every time a new plate is issued to that particular manufacturer
	Wisconsin	Motorcycle	Embossed red serial on white plate with border line; "A WIS 53" at top	1234	1 to approximately 9000	
	Wisconsin	Motorcycle sidecar	Embossed red serial on white plate with border line; "B WIS 53" at top	123	1 to approximately 100	
	Wisconsin	Motorcycle dealer	Embossed white serial on red plate; "WIS 1953" at top, vertical "DLR" at right	AB1, A12	Dealer number and plate number	Number is the dealer number, letters increment every time a new plate is issued to that specific dealer
	Wisconsin	Municipal	Embossed black serial on white plate; "WIS" at top left, "53" at top right; "MUNICIPAL" at bottom	12-345	1 to approximately 12-500	
	Wisconsin	Municipal motorcycle	Embossed black serial on white plate with border line; unknown format	M123	M 1 to approximately M350	
	Wisconsin	Official	Embossed black serial on white plate; "WIS" at top left, "53" at top right; "OFFICIAL" at bottom	123	1 to approximately 600	
	Wisconsin	School bus	Embossed white serial on dark blue plate; "WIS" at top left, "SCH" at top right; "53" at bottom left, quarterly tab at far right	A 12	Coded by weight class (A)	
	Wisconsin	Light private trailer	Embossed black serial on orange plate; "EXP" at top left, "DEC 52" at top right; "WIS TRAILER" at bottom	A 1234	Coded by weight class (A)	Revalidated for 1953 with black on yellow tabs
	Wisconsin	Light private trailer	Embossed black serial on orange plate; "EXP" at top left, "DEC 53" at top right; "WIS TRAILER" at bottom	A12-345	Coded by weight class (A)	
	Wisconsin	Heavy trailer	Embossed white serial on dark blue plate; "WIS" at top left, "TRL" at top right; "53" at bottom left, quarterly tab at far right	A 123	Coded by weight class (A)	Issued to all commercial trailers, and private trailers above 8,000lbs. Weight classes are A, B, C, D, E, F, G, H, J, K, L, M, N, R, S, T, V, and X for commercial trailers, and private trailers use the E weight class and above
	Wisconsin	Trailer dealer	Embossed white serial on red plate; "WIS" at top left, "53" at top right; "DEALER" at bottom	A 12 TL	Dealer number and plate number	Number is the dealer number, letter prefix increments every time a new plate is issued to that specific dealer
	Wisconsin	Light truck	Embossed black serial on orange plate; "EXP" at top left, "DEC 52" at top right; "WIS TRUCK" at bottom	A12-345	Coded by weight class (A)	Revalidated for 1953 with black on white tabs. Weight classes are A, B, C, and D.
	Wisconsin	Heavy truck	Embossed white serial on dark blue plate; "WIS" at top left, "TRK" at top right; "53" at bottom left, quarterly tab at far right	A12345	Coded by weight class (A)	Weight classes are E, F, G, H, J, K, L, M, N, R, S, T, V, and X. Also issued to light trucks for hire in the A, B, C, and D weight classes.

== See also ==
- Antique vehicle registration
- Electronic license plate
- Motor vehicle registration
- Vehicle license
