= Vehicle registration plates of the United States for 1956 =

1956 license plates in the United States

Vehicle registration plates of the United States by year
Vehicle registration plates of the United States for 1955	Events of 1956	Vehicle registration plates of the United States for 1957

Each of the 48 states of the United States of America plus several of its territories and the District of Columbia issued individual passenger license plates for 1956.

In 1956, the U.S. states and Canadian provinces came to an agreement with the American Association of Motor Vehicle Administrators, the Automobile Manufacturers Association and the National Safety Council that standardized the size for license plates for vehicles (except those for motorcycles) at 6 inches (15 cm) in height by 12 inches (30 cm) in width, with standardized mounting holes, which has been the standard size for North American license plates since. Motorcycles and other specialized vehicles often were issued smaller-sized tags.

== Passenger baseplates ==
Passenger car plates
Image	Region	Design	Slogan	Serial format	Serials issued	Notes
	Alabama					
	Alaska					
	American Samoa					
	Arizona					
	Arkansas					
	California					
	Canal Zone					
	Colorado					
	Connecticut					
	Delaware					
	District of Columbia					
	Florida					
	Georgia					
	Guam					
	Hawai'i					
	Idaho					
	Illinois					
	Indiana					
	Iowa					
	Kansas					
	Kentucky					
	Louisiana	Embossed white serial with pelican separator on dark green plate with border line; "19 LOUISIANA 56" at top	none	123 456	1 001 to about 801 000	
	Maine					
	Maryland					
	Massachusetts					
	Michigan					
	Minnesota					
	Mississippi					
	Missouri					
	Montana					
	Nebraska					
	Nevada					
	New Hampshire					
	New Jersey					
	New Mexico					
	New York					
	North Carolina	Embossed black serial on golden yellow plate with border line; "NORTH CAROLINA 56" at bottom	"DRIVE SAFELY" centered at top	A-1234; AB-1234		Serials progressed as follows: A-1 through A-9999, AA-1 through AZ-9999, B-1 through B-9999, BA-1 through BZ-9999, etc. This continued through 1972. Letters G, I, O and Q not used; this practice continued through 1968.
	North Dakota					
	Northern Mariana; Islands					
	Ohio					
	Oklahoma					
	Oregon					
	Pennsylvania					
	Puerto Rico					
	Rhode Island					
	South Carolina					
	South Dakota					
	Tennessee					
	Texas					
	Utah					
	Vermont					
	Virginia					
	Washington					
	West Virginia					
	Wisconsin	Embossed green serial on white plate; "EXP" at top left, month of expiration and "55" at top right; slogan at bottom	AMERICA'S DAIRYLAND	A12-345, AK 1234	Coded by month of expiration (A). AK 1234 format used when A12-345 format was exhausted.	
	Wyoming					

== Non-passenger plates ==
Non-passenger Plates
Image (standard)	Region	Type	Design & Slogan	Serial format	Serials issued	Notes
	Wisconsin	Bus	Embossed orange serial on black plate; "WIS" at top left, "BUS" at top right; "56" at bottom left, quarterly tab at far right	A 12	Coded by weight class(A)	
	Wisconsin	BX bus	Embossed black serial on orange plate; unknown format	BX123	BX 1 to unknown	First year of issue. Issued to privately owned mass transportation vehicles; also named "Urban Bus" plates
	Wisconsin	Canadian reciprocity	Embossed black serial on orange plate; unknown format	CR 12	CR 1 to unknown	
	Wisconsin	Dealer	Embossed red serial on white plate; "WIS" at top left, "56" at top right; "DEALER" at bottom	A 1234	Dealer number and plate number	Number is the dealer number, letters increment when a new plate is issued to that specific dealer
	Wisconsin	Disabled veteran	Unknown format			
	Wisconsin	Farm	Embossed yellow serial on blue plate; "EXP" at top left, "DEC 55" at top right; "WIS FARM" at bottom	12345	1 to approximately 96000	Revalidated for 1956 with white on red tabs
	Wisconsin	Heavy farm	Embossed yellow serial on blue plate; "EXP" at top left, "DEC 55" at top right; "WIS FARM" at bottom	A 1234	Coded by weight class (A)	Revalidated for 1956 with white on red tabs
	Wisconsin	In transit	Embossed red serial on white plate; "WIS" at top left, "56" at top right; "IN TRANSIT" at bottom	AB 12	Transporter number and plate number	Number is the transporter number, letters increment every time a new plate is issued to that specific transporter
	Wisconsin	Manufacturer	Embossed red serial on white plate; "WIS" at top left, "56" at top right; "MANUFACTURER" at bottom	AB 12	Manufacturer number and plate number	Number is the manufacturer number, letters increment every time a new plat is issued to that specific manufacturer
	Wisconsin	Mobile home	Embossed white serial on green plate; "EXP" at top left, "DEC 55" at top right; "WIS MOBILE HOME" at bottom	1234	1 to approximately 6500	Revalidated to 1956 with red on aluminum tabs
	Wisconsin	Motorcycle	Embossed black serial on yellow plate with border line; "A WIS 56" at top	1234	1 to approximately 9500	
	Wisconsin	Motorcycle sidecar	Embossed black serial on yellow plate with border line; "B WIS 56" at top	123	1 to approximately 100	
	Wisconsin	Motorcycle dealer	Embossed red serial on white plate with border line; "WIS 1956" at top, vertical stacked "DLR" at right	AB1, A12	Dealer number and plate number	Number is the dealer number, letters increment every time a new plate is issued to that specific dealer
	Wisconsin	Municipal	Embossed white serial on blue plate; "WIS" at top left, "56" at top right; "MUNICIPAL" at bottom	12345	1 to approximately 14000	
	Wisconsin	Municipal motorcycle	Embossed white serial on blue plate with border line; unknown format	M123	M 1 to unknown	
	Wisconsin	Official	Embossed white serial on blue plate; "WIS" at top left, "56" at top right; "OFFICIAL" at bottom, embossed hollow at left	123	1 to approximately 700	
	Wisconsin	Permit reciprocity	Embossed orange serial on black plate; unknown format	PR123	PR 1 to approximately PR 1000	First year of issue
	Wisconsin	School bus	Embossed orange serial on black plate; "WIS" at top left, "SCH" at top right; "56" at bottom left, quarterly tab at far right	A 12	Coded by weight class (A)	
	Wisconsin	Special-UX	Embossed orange serial on black plate; "EXP" at top left, "JUL 56" at top right; "WIS" at bottom	UX 1234	UX 1 to approximately UX 1500	First known year of issue. Used on vehicles with specific permanently mounted equipment; plate type also called "special mobile equipment"
	Wisconsin	Special-X	Embossed white serial on blue plate; "WIS" at top left, "56" at top right	123 X	1 X to approximately 200 X	
	Wisconsin	State patrol	Embossed black serial on white plate; "STATE" over "PATROL" at left, hollow black star to right of caption; "WISCONSIN" at bottom	123	Coded by district (1)	
	Wisconsin	Tax only	Embossed orange serial on black plate; unknown format	123	1 to unknown	
	Wisconsin	Tractor	Embossed orange serial on black plate; unknown format	A 123	Coded by weight class (A)	
	Wisconsin	Light trailer	Embossed white serial on green plate; "EXP" at top left, "DEC 55" at top right; "WIS TRAILER" at bottom	A 1234	Coded by weight class (A)	Revalidated to 1956 with red on aluminum tabs.
	Wisconsin	Insert trailer	Embossed orange serial on black plate; "WIS" at top left, "TRL" at top right; "56" at bottom left, quarterly tab at far right	A 123	Coded by weight class (A)	Weight classes are E, F, G, H, J, K, L, M, N, R, S, T, V, X, and Y. Also issued to light trailers for hire in the A, B, C, and D weight classes.
	Wisconsin	Commercial semi-trailer	Embossed orange serial on black plate; "EXP" at top left, "JUN 56" at top right; "WIS SEMI-TRAILER" at bottom	CS 1234	CS 1 to approximately CS 8000	
	Wisconsin	Commercial semi-trailer	Embossed orange serial on black plate; "EXP" at top left, "JUN 56" at top right; "WIS SEMI TRAILER" at bottom	CS 1234	CS 1 to approximately CS 8000	
	Wisconsin	Private semi-trailer	Embossed orange serial on black plate; "EXP" at top left, "JUN 56" at top right; "WIS SEMI-TRAILER" at bottom	PS 1234	PS 1 to approximately PS 5000	
	Wisconsin	Private semi-trailer	Embossed orange serial on black plate; "EXP" at top left, "JUN 56" at top right; "WIS SEMI TRAILER" at bottom	PS 1234	PS 1 to approximately PS 5000	
	Wisconsin	Trailer dealer	Embossed red serial on white plate; "WIS" at top left, "56" at top right; "DEALER" at bottom	A 123 TL	Dealer number and plate number	Number is the dealer number, letter prefix increments when a new plate is issued to that dealer
	Wisconsin	Light truck	Embossed white serial on green plate; "EXP" at top left, "DEC 55" at top right; "WIS TRUCK" at bottom	A12-345	Coded by weight class (A). Serials started at A25-001	Revalidated for 1956 with black on white tabs. Weight classes are A, B, C, and D.
	Wisconsin	Insert truck	Embossed orange serial on black plate; "WIS" at top left, "TRK" at top right; "56" at bottom left, quarterly tab at far right	A1234	Coded by weight class (A)	Weight classes are E, F, G, H, J, K, L, M, N, R, S, T, V, X. Also issued to light trucks for hire in the A, B, C, and D weight classes.

== See also ==
- Antique vehicle registration
- Electronic license plate
- Motor vehicle registration
- Vehicle license
