= Vehicle registration plates of the United States for 1952 =

1952 license plates in the United States

Vehicle registration plates of the United States by year
Vehicle registration plates of the United States for 1951	Events of 1952	Vehicle registration plates of the United States for 1953

Each of the 48 states of the United States of America plus several of its territories and the District of Columbia issued individual passenger license plates for 1952. Many states revalidated their 1951 plates due to Korean War metal savings.

== Passenger baseplates ==
Passenger car plates
Image	Region	Design	Slogan	Serial format	Serials issued	Notes
	Alabama					
	Alaska					
	American Samoa					
	Arizona					
	Arkansas					
	California					
	Canal Zone					
	Colorado					
	Connecticut					
	Delaware					
	District of Columbia					
	Florida					
	Georgia					
	Guam					
	Hawai'i					
	Idaho					
	Illinois					
	Indiana	Embossed black serial on white plate; "INDIANA" and "51" centered at top and bottom respectively	none	AB 1234	County-coded	Revalidated for 1952 with yellow tabs.
	Iowa					
	Kansas					
	Kentucky					
	Louisiana					
	Maine					
	Maryland					
	Massachusetts					
	Michigan					
	Minnesota					
	Mississippi					
	Missouri					
	Montana					
	Nebraska					
	Nevada					
	New Hampshire					
	New Jersey					
	New Mexico					
	New York					
	North Carolina					
	North Dakota					
	Northern Mariana; Islands					
	Ohio	1951 blue on white plate				A black on green windshield sticker, with yellow boxes, was used to revalidate the 1951 plate.
	Oklahoma					
	Oregon					
	Pennsylvania					
	Puerto Rico					
	Rhode Island					
	South Carolina					
	South Dakota					
	Tennessee					
	Texas	yellow on black		A/B1234 various		
	Utah					
	Vermont					
	Virginia					
	Washington					
	West Virginia					
	Wisconsin	Embossed white serial on black plate; "EXP. WISCONSIN 46" at top, slogan at bottom	AMERICA'S DAIRYLAND	1/2 12345	Coded by month of expiration (1/2)	Revalidated for 1952 with black on yellow tabs
	Wisconsin	Embossed white serial on black plate; "EXP. WISCONSIN 47" at top, slogan at bottom	AMERICA'S DAIRYLAND	1/2 12345	Coded by month of expiration (1/2)	Revalidated for 1952 with black on yellow tabs
	Wisconsin	Embossed white serial on black plate; "EXP. WISCONSIN" at top, slogan at bottom	AMERICA'S DAIRYLAND	1/2 12345	Coded by month of expiration (1/2)	Revalidated for 1952 with black on yellow tabs
	Wisconsin	Embossed white serial on black plate; "EXP WISCONSIN" at top, slogan at bottom	AMERICA'S DAIRYLAND	1/2 123-456	Coded by month of expiration (1/2)	Revalidated for 1952 with black on yellow tabs
	Wyoming					

== Non-passenger plates ==
Non-passenger plates
Image (standard)	Region	Type	Design and slogan	Serial format	Serials issued	Notes
	Wisconsin	Bus	Embossed black serial on yellow plate; "WIS" at top left, "BUS" at top right; "51" at bottom left, "52" at bottom right	A 12	Coded by weight class (A)	
	Wisconsin	Cabin	Embossed white serial on red plate; "WIS CABIN" at bottom, "EXP 6 1951" at top	1234	1 to approximately 7000	Revalidated for June 1952 with white on green tabs
	Wisconsin	Cabin	Embossed black serial on orange plate; "EXP" at top left, "DEC 52" at top right; "WIS CABIN" at bottom	1234	1 to approximately 5100	
	Wisconsin	Dealer	Embossed white serial on green plate; "19 WISCONSIN 52" at bottom, "DEALER" at top	A 1234	Dealer number and plate number	Number is the dealer number, letters increment when a new plate is issued to that particular dealer
	Wisconsin	Disabled veteran	Unknown format			
	Wisconsin	Farm	Embossed white serial on gray plate; "WIS FARM" at bottom, "EXP 6 1951" at top	12345	1 to approximately 95000	Revalidated to 1952 with white on red tabs
	Wisconsin	Farm	Embossed black serial on bare aluminum plate; "EXP" at top left, "DEC 52" at top right; "WIS FARM" at bottom	12-345	1 to approximately 90-000	
	Wisconsin	In transit	Embossed white serial on green plate; "19 WISCONSIN 52" at bottom, "IN TRANSIT" at top	AB 12	Transporter number and plate number	Number is the transporter number, letters increment every time a new plate is issued to that particular transporter
	Wisconsin	Manufacturer	Embossed white serial on green plate; "19 WISCONSIN 52" at bottom, "MANUFACTURER" at top	AB 12	Manufacturer number and plate number	Number is the manufacturer number, letters increment every time a new plate is issued to that particular manufacturer
	Wisconsin	Motorcycle	Embossed black serial on yellow plate with border line; "A WIS 52" at top	1234	1 to approximately 7000	
	Wisconsin	Motorcycle sidecar	Embossed black serial on yellow plate with border line; "B WIS 52" at top	123	1 to approximately 175	
	Wisconsin	Motorcycle dealer	Embossed white serial on green plate with border line; "WIS 1952" at top, vertical "DLR" at right	AB1, A12	Dealer number and plate number	Number is the dealer number, letters increment every time a new plate is issued for that specific dealer
	Wisconsin	Municipal	Embossed yellow serial on black plate; "19 WISCONSIN 52" at bottom, "MUNICIPAL" at top	12345	1 to approximately 12500	
	Wisconsin	Municipal motorcycle	Embossed yellow serial on black plate with border line; unknown format	M123	M 1 to unknown	
	Wisconsin	Official	Embossed yellow serial on black plate; "19 WISCONSIN 52" at bottom, "OFFICIAL" at top	123	1 to unknown (high 136)	
	Wisconsin	School bus	Embossed black serial on yellow plate; "WIS" at top left, "SCH" at top right; "51" at bottom left, "52" at bottom right	A 12	Coded by weight class (A)	
	Wisconsin	Light private trailer	Embossed white serial on red plate; "WIS TRAILER" at bottom, "EXP 6 1951" at top	A 1234	Coded by weight class (A)	Revalidated to June 1952 with white on green tabs.
	Wisconsin	Light private trailer	Embossed black serial on orange plate; "EXP" at top left, "DEC 52" at top right	A 1234	Coded by weight class (A)	
	Wisconsin	Heavy trailer	Embossed black serial on yellow plate; "WIS" at top left, "TRL" at top right; "51" at bottom left, "52" at bottom right	A 123	Coded by weight class (A)	Issued to all commercial trailers, and private trailers over 8,000lbs. Weight classes are A, B, C, D, E, F, G, H, J, K, L, M, N, R, S, T, V, and X for commercial trailers, and private trailers use the E weight class and above.
	Wisconsin	Trailer dealer	Embossed white serial on green plate; "19 WISCONSIN 52" at bottom, "DEALER" at top	A 12 TL	Dealer number and plate number	Number is the dealer number, letter prefix is incremented every time a new plate is issued for that specific dealer
	Wisconsin	Light truck	Embossed white serial on red plate; "WIS TRUCK" at bottom, "EXP 6 1951" at top	A 12345	Coded by weight class (A)	Revalidated to June 1952 with white on black tabs. Weight classes are A, B, C, and D.
	Wisconsin	Light truck	Embossed black serial on orange plate; "EXP" at top left, "DEC 52" at top right; "WIS TRUCK" at bottom	A12-345	Coded by weight class (A)	Weight classes are A, B, C, and D.
	Wisconsin	Heavy truck	Embossed black serial on yellow plate; "WIS" at top left, "TRK" at top right; "51" at bottom left, "52" at bottom right	A12345	Coded by weight class (A)	Weight classes are E, F, G, H, J, K, L, M, N, R, S, T, V, and X. Also issued to light trucks for hire in the A, B, C, and D weight classes.

== See also ==
- Antique vehicle registration
- Electronic license plate
- Motor vehicle registration
- Vehicle license
