= Vehicle registration plates of the United States for 1954 =

1954 license plates in the United States

Vehicle registration plates of the United States by year
Vehicle registration plates of the United States for 1953	Events of 1954	Vehicle registration plates of the United States for 1955

Nearly all of the 48 states of the United States of America plus its territories and the District of Columbia issued individual passenger license plates for the year 1954. The exception was Massachusetts, which issued renewal stickers for windshield display instead alongside 1953 registration plates.

== Passenger baseplates ==
Passenger car plates
Image	Region	Design	Slogan	Serial format	Serials issued	Notes
	Alabama	Embossed white lettering and rims on blue base.	none	0-12-345; 00-12-345		County-coded
	Alaska	Embossed blue numbers on golden yellow plate with border line; embossed territorial flag at left; "ALASKA" embossed in blue block letters centered at top; "53" embossed in top right corner	none	12345	1 to approximately 96000	White tabs revalidated 1953 Alaska plates for 1954
	American Samoa					
	Arizona	Navy blue digits on white background; ARIZONA and last two numbers of year of issue embossed and centered along top.	"GRAND CANYON STATE"	A-12345	Coded by county of issuance (A)	
	Arkansas	Embossed white numbers on dark green plate with border line; "ARKANSAS 1954" embossed in white block letters centered at top.	"LAND OF OPPORTUNITY" embossed in white block letters centered at bottom	123-456	1 to approximately 393000	
	California	Embossed yellow lettering on black base; "CALIFORNIA 51" embossed at bottom	none	1A 23 456; 12 A 3 456	unknown	White-on-pink tabs revalidated 1951 base plate for 1954
	Canal Zone	Emobssed white on orange	none	12345		
	Colorado	Embossed white lettering and rims on black base;	"Colorful" embossed at top	1-1234; A1-1234; 1A-1234; 10-1234; A10-123; 10A-123	County-coded	
	Connecticut	Black rough-textured lettering embossed on unpainted aluminum base, "CT" embossed at bottom right.	none			Metal colored tabs insert at bottom center to revalidate 1948 base plate.
	Delaware	Reflective white scotchlite painted stainless steel numbers riveted on black painted stainless steel base plate. Base plate embossed with Delaware on top. Insert spaces at bottom. Insert format continued as original.	none	123456	1 to approximately 200000	Plates were smaller than the 6 digit plates if they were 5 digits or lower. 1951 base plates renewed with metal tabs for 1954.
	District of Columbia				unknown	
	Florida	Embossed orange numbers on blue plate with border line; "FLORIDA" embossed in wide orange block letters centered at top; "19" embossed in bottom left corner and "54" in bottom right corner.	"SUNSHINE STATE" embossed at bottom.	12-34567; 12A34567	unknown	Coded by county, weight, and class
	Georgia	Embossed black lettering and rims on golden yellow base.	"PEACH STATE" embossed at bottom.	A-12345; A/B-12345		Coded by county
	Guam					
	Hawai'i					
	Idaho	Embossed black numbers on white plate with border line; "IDAHO 54" embossed in black block letters centered at bottom.	none	A 12345; 0/A 12345		Coded by county
	Illinois	White lettering embossed on black base; "19 ILLINOIS 54" at bottom.	"LAND OF LINCOLN" embossed at top	123 456; 1234 567	1 to approximately 2700 000	First use of "Land of Lincoln" nickname
	Indiana	White lettering embossed on maroon base; "54" embossed at top and state name at bottom.	none	AB 1234		County-coded
	Iowa	Embossed black numbers on white plate with border line; "19 IOWA 53" embossed in black block letters centered at top.	"THE CORN STATE" embossed in black block letters centered at bottom.	1-23456; 12-34567	first number (on single-digit county code plates) or first two numbers (on doube-digit county code plates and non-resident plates) used for county code	County-coded; Metal renewal tab used on 1953 base plates for 1954.
	Kansas	Embossed black numbers on white state-shaped plate with border line; "KANSAS 54" embossed in black block letters centered at top.	"THE WHEAT STATE" embossed in black block letters centered at bottom.	A/B-12345		County-coded
	Kentucky	Embossed dark blue numbers on white plate; "KENTUCKY" embossed in narrow dark blue block letters at top with "-'54" to right; county name embossed in wide dark blue block letters centered at bottom.	TOUR KENTUCKY embossed at top.	123-456		Issued in blocks by county
	Louisiana	Yellow base with embossed green lettering and border and pelican in center. "LOUISIANA-YAMS" embossed at bottom center between "19" and "54."	YAMS	123 456		
	Maine	Embossed black numbers on white plate with border line; "MAINE" embossed in black block letters offset to left above numbers, with metal tab slots to right.	"VACATIONLAND" embossed in black block letters centered below numbers.	123-456	1 to approximately 375-000	1950 plates revalidated for 1954 with silver tabs.
	Maryland	Embossed yellow numbers and rims on black plate with border line; "MARYLAND" and "54" embossed in yellow block letters centered above and below numbers respectively.	none	AB-12-34	A-10-01 to approximately JF-65-00	For each two-letter series, only the letters A through H, and J, were used.
	Massachusetts	Massachusetts issued windshield stickers to renew 1953 base plates for 1954. Image of the windshield sticker is shown at left.				
	Michigan	Yellow embossed lettering and rims on dark blue base; "19 MICHIGAN 54" at top.	"WATER WONDERLAND" embossed at bottom.	AB-12-34		County-coded
	Minnesota	Embossed blue numbers on cream plate with border line; "MINNESOTA" embossed in blue block letters centered at bottom; "19" embossed in bottom left corner and "54" in bottom right corner.	"10,000 LAKES" embossed at top.	123-456		
	Mississippi	Black base with embossed white lettering and border. The county name was stamped on the bottom of the license plate.	none	123-456	unknown	Issued in numerical blocks by county.
	Missouri	Embossed white lettering on maroon base. "MISSOURI" embossed at top.	none	A12-345		
	Montana	Embossed white numbers on black plate with state-shaped border; "MONTANA–53" embossed in white block letters below numbers	"THE TREASURE STATE" embossed in white block letters above numbers	1-12345; 10-1234		1953 base plates were revalidated for 1954 with silver-gray metal tabs. Coded by county of issue.
	Nebraska	Embossed yellow lettering on black base. "NEBRASKA 54" embossed at top.	none	12-3456		County-coded
	Nevada	Embossed silver numbers on dark blue plate with border line; "NEVADA 1954" embossed in silver block letters at bottom.	none	A/ 1-234; A/B1-234		County-coded
	New Hampshire	Embossed white numbers on forest green plate with border line; "NEW HAMPSHIRE" embossed in white block letters at bottom; embossed "1954" centered at top	none	AB123		County-coded
	New Jersey	Embossed orange lettering on black base; "N. 52 J." embossed at bottom.	none	A/B 123; A/B 12A; A/B A12; A/B 1A2; A/B 1234		County-coded. Orange-on-silver "54" renewal tabs used on 1952 base.
	New Mexico	Embossed yellow lettering on black base. "NEBRASKA 54" embossed at top.	none	12-3456		County-coded
	New York	Embossed gold lettering on black base; "NY" embossed in gold block letters in bottom left corner and "53" in bottom right corner.	"THE EMPIRE STATE" embossed at bottom center	AB12-34		County-coded. 1953 base plates revalidated with black-on-gold "54" tabs.
	North Carolina	Embossed black lettering on golden yellow base. Either "NORTH CAROLINA 54" or "N.C. DRIVE SAFELY 54" embossed at bottom.	none	123-456; A-12345	100-001 to 760-000 on all-number format	W, R, N, and X used on letter format
	North Dakota	Embossed white numbers on black plate with border line; "NORTH DAKOTA 54" embossed in white block letters at top.	none	123-456	1 to approximately 200-000	
	Northern Mariana Islands					
	Ohio	Embossed white numbers on maroon plate with border line; "OHIO 1954" embossed in white block letters at bottom.	none	A·12345; AB·1234; 12345·A; 1234·AB; A·1234·B		Issued in blocks by county
	Oklahoma	Embossed yellow numbers on black plate; "54 OKLAHOMA" embossed at bottom.	none	1-123456; 10-12345		County-coded
	Oregon	Embossed black numbers on aluminum plate with border line; "OREGON" embossed in black block letters centered above numbers; month of expiration embossed in top left corner.	none	123-456	1 to approximately 999-999	"54" revalidation tabs issued to be placed on top right corner of 1951 and 1950 base plates.
	Pennsylvania	Embossed yellow lettering and state-shaped border on blue base. "1954 PENNA" embossed at top below 3-31-55 expiration date..	none	123AB		
	Puerto Rico	Embossed black serial number on yellow background; black 1953-54 at top and Puerto Rico at bottom both embossed	none	12-345; 123-456		
	Rhode Island	Embossed black lettering on white base. "RHODE 53 ISLAND" embossed at bottom.	none	A1234		Black "54" renewal tabs inserted over 53 at bottom center.
	South Carolina	Embossed white numbers on black plate; "SOUTH CAROLINA 54" embossed in white block letters at bottom.	none	A-123-456		Coded by weight class (A)
	South Dakota	Embossed black lettering on white base with Mount Rushmore decal at top.	none	1-1234; 1-A123; 12-1234; 12-A123		Coded by county (1 or 10 prefix)
	Tennessee	Embossed yellow numbers on black state-shaped plate with border line; "TENN. 54" embossed in yellow block letters centered at bottom.	none	1-12345; 10-1234; 1D-12345; 10D-1234		(D) in registration indicates vehicles weighing over 3,500 lbs.
	Texas					
	Utah					
	Vermont	Embossed dark green numbers on white plate; "54 VERMONT" embossed in dark green block letters centered at bottom.	none	12345; A1234		
	Virginia	Embossed white numbers on black plate; "VIRGINIA 1954" embossed in white block letters at top.	none	123-456	1 to approximately 999-999	
	Washington	Embossed white numbers on green plate; "54 WASHINGTON" embossed in white block letters at bottom.	none	123-456 A 12-345 AB		County-coded (A or AB)
	West Virginia	Embossed yellow numbers on black plate with border line; "W. VA. EXP.-6-30-54" embossed in yellow block letters at bottom.	none	123-456		
	Wisconsin	Embossed black numbers on golden yellow plate; "WIS" embossed in black block letters in top left corner; month of expiration and "53" embossed in top right corner.	"AMERICA'S DAIRYLAND" embossed in black block letters centered at bottom.	A12-345		Letter corresponds to month of expiration. Red "54" tabs revalidated 1953 base plate for this year.
	Wyoming	Embossed black numbers and Bucking Horse and Rider on white plate with border line; "54 WYOMING" embossed in black block letters at bottom.	none	1-12345; 10-1234		County-coded

== Non-passenger plates ==
Non-passenger plates
Image (standard)	Region	Type	Design and slogan	Serial format	Serials issued	Notes
	Wisconsin	Bus	Embossed white serial on green plate; "WIS" at top left, "BUS" at top right; "54" at bottom left, quarterly tab at far right	A 12	Coded by weight class (A)	
	Wisconsin	Cabin	Embossed yellow serial on black plate; "EXP" at top left, "DEC 54" at top right; "WIS CABIN" at bottom	1234	1 to approximately 7000	
	Wisconsin	Dealer	Embossed white serial on blue plate; "WIS" at top left, "54" at top right; "DEALER" at bottom	A 1234	Dealer number and plate number	Number is the dealer number, letters increment every time a new plate is issued to that specific dealer
	Wisconsin	Disabled veteran	Unknown design			
	Wisconsin	Farm	Embossed red serial on cream plate; "EXP" at top left, "DEC 54" at top right; "WIS FARM" at bottom	12345	1 to approximately 60000	
	Wisconsin	Heavy farm	Embossed red serial on cream plate; "EXP" at top left, "DEC 54" at top right; "WIS FARM" at bottom	A 1234	Coded by weight class (A)	Weight classes are F, G, H, J, K, L, M, N, R, and S. Issued to farm trucks above 12,000lbs.
	Wisconsin	In transit	Embossed white serial on blue plate; "WIS" at top left, "54" at top right; "IN TRANSIT" at bottom	AB 12	Transporter number and plate number	Number is the transporter number, letters increment every time a new plate is issued to that specific transporter
	Wisconsin	Manufacturer	Embossed white serial on blue plate; "WIS" at top left, "54" at top right, "MANUFACTURER" at bottom	AB 12	Manufacturer number and plate number	Number is the manufacturer number, letters increment every time a new plate is issued to that specific manufacturer
	Wisconsin	Motorcycle	Embossed green serial on white plate with border line; "A WIS 54" at top	1234	1 to approximately 5500	
	Wisconsin	Motorcycle dealer	Embossed white serial on blue plate with border line; "WIS 1954" at top, vertical stacked "DLR" at right	AB1, A12	Dealer number and plate number	Number is the dealer number, letters increment every time a new plate is issued to that specific dealer
	Wisconsin	Municipal	Embossed green serial on bare aluminum plate; "WIS" at top left, "54" at top right; "MUNICIPAL" at bottom	12345	1 to approximately 14300	
	Wisconsin	Municipal motorcycle	Embossed green serial on bare aluminum plate with border line; unknown format	M123	M 1 to unknown	
	Wisconsin	Official	Embossed green serial on bare aluminum plate; "WIS" at top left, "54" at top right; "OFFICIAL" at bottom	123	1 to unknown	
	Wisconsin	School bus	Embossed white serial on green plate; "WIS" at top left, "SCH" at top right; "54" at bottom left, quarterly tab at far right	A 12	Coded by weight class (A)	
	Wisconsin	Special-X	Embossed green serial on bare aluminum plate; "WIS" at top left, "54" at top right	123 X	1 X to approximately 150 X	
	Wisconsin	Light trailer	Embossed yellow serial on black plate; "EXP" at top left, "DEC 54" at top right; "WIS TRAILER" at bottom	A 1234	Coded by weight class (A)	
	Wisconsin	Heavy trailer	Embossed white serial on green plate; "WIS" at top left, "TRL" at top right; "54" at bottom left, quarterly tab at far right	A 123	Coded by weight class (A)	Weight classes are E, F, G, H, J, K, L, M, N, R, S, T, V, and X. Also issued to light trailers for hire in the A, B, C, and D weight classes.
	Wisconsin	Private semi-trailer	Embossed white serial on green plate; "EXP" at top left, "JUN 54" at top right; "WIS TRAILER" at bottom	PS 123	PS 1 to unknown (PS 168 high)	
	Wisconsin	Commercial semi-trailer	Embossed white serial on green plate; "EXP" at top left, "JUN 54" at top right; "WIS TRAILER" at bottom	CS 1234	CS 1 to unknown	
	Wisconsin	Trailer dealer	Embossed white serial on blue plate; "WIS" at top left, "54" at top right; "DEALER" at bottom	A 12 TL	Dealer number and plate number	Number is the dealer number, letters increment every time a new plate is issued to that dealer
	Wisconsin	Light truck	Embossed yellow serial on black plate; "EXP" at top left, "DEC 54" at top right; "WIS TRUCK" at bottom	A12-345	Coded by weight class (A)	Weight classes are A, B, C, and D.
	Wisconsin	Heavy truck	Embossed white serial on green plate; "WIS" at top left, "TRK" at top right; "54" at bottom left; quarterly tab at far right	A12345	Coded by weight class (A)	Weight classes are E, F, G, H, J, K, L, M, N, R, S, T, V, and X. Also issued to light trucks for hire in the A, B, C, and D weight classes.

== See also ==
- Antique vehicle registration
- Electronic license plate
- Motor vehicle registration
- Vehicle license
