= Vehicle registration plates of Louisiana =

Louisiana vehicle license plates

Louisiana
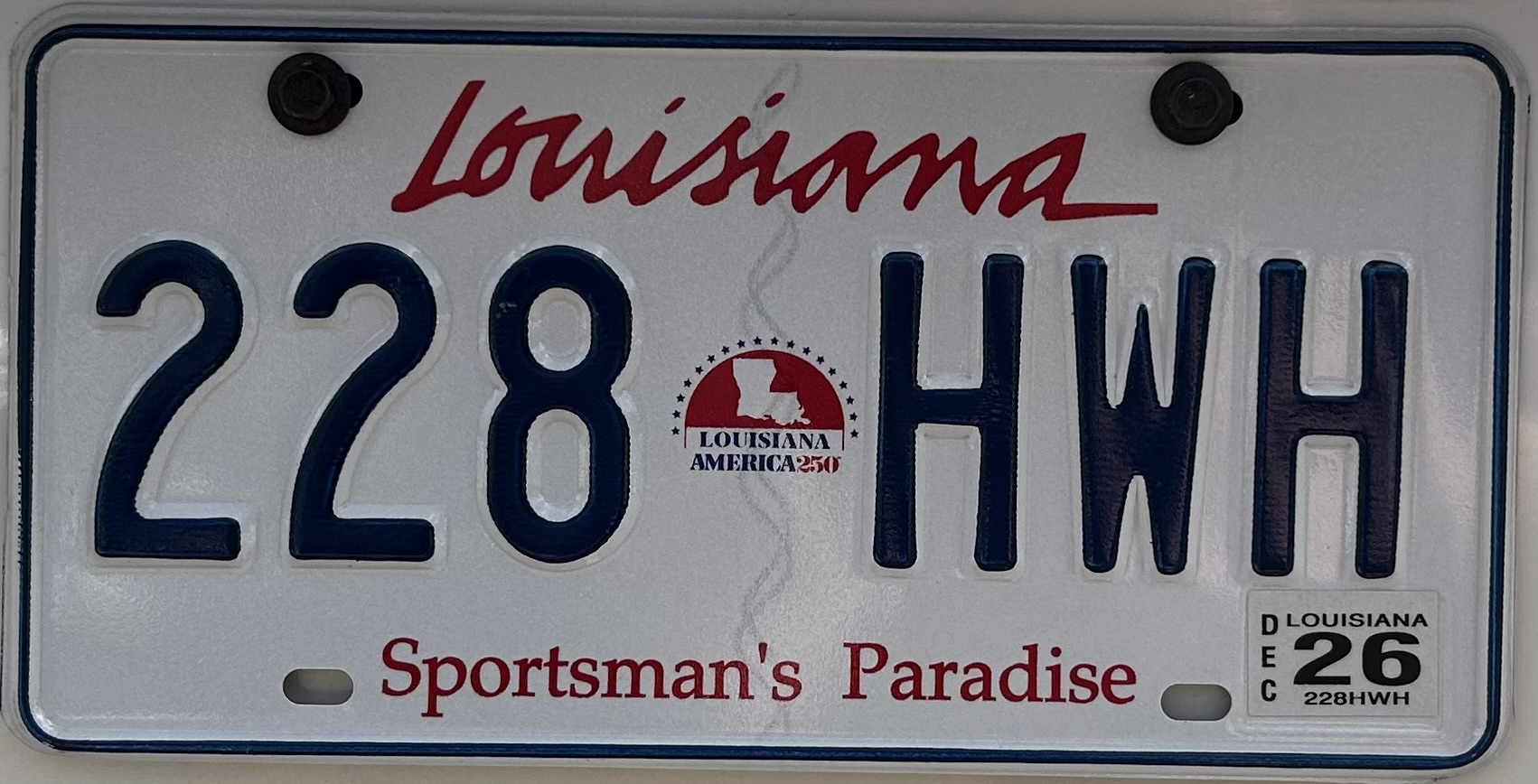

Current series
- Slogan: Sportsman's Paradise
- Size: 12 in × 6 in 30 cm × 15 cm
- Material: Aluminum
- Serial format: 123 ABC
- Introduced: January 2025

Availability
- Issued by: Louisiana Department of Public Safety & Corrections, Public Safety Services, Office of Motor Vehicles

History
- First issued: January 1, 1915

The U.S. state of Louisiana first required its residents to register their motor vehicles and display license plates in 1915. As of 2026, plates are issued by the Public Safety Services division of the Louisiana Department of Public Safety & Corrections, through the division's Office of Motor Vehicles. Only rear plates have been required since 1952.

== Passenger baseplates ==
=== 1915 to 1963 ===
In 1956, the United States, Canada, and Mexico came to an agreement with the American Association of Motor Vehicle Administrators, the Automobile Manufacturers Association and the National Safety Council that standardized the size for license plates for vehicles (except those for motorcycles) at 6 inches (15 cm) in height by 12 inches (30 cm) in width, with standardized mounting holes. The 1954 (dated 1955) issue was the first Louisiana license plate that complied with these standards.

Image	Dates issued	Design	Slogan	Serial format	Serials issued	Notes
	1915	Embossed white serial on dark blue plate; vertical "LA" and "1915" at left and right respectively	none	12345	1 to approximately 10500	
	1916	Embossed white serial on green plate; stylized "LA" and "16" at left	none	12345	1 to approximately 16000	
	1917	Embossed dark blue serial on white plate; stylized "LA" and "17" at left	none	12345	1 to approximately 27000	
	1918	Embossed black serial on orange plate with border line; stylized "LA" and "18" at left	none	12345	1 to approximately 40000	
	1919	Embossed black serial on light green plate with border line; stylized "LA" and "19" at left	none	12345	1 to approximately 50000	
	1920	Embossed white serial on maroon plate; stylized "LA" and "20" at left	none	12345	1 to approximately 54000	
	1921	Embossed black serial on gray plate with border line; stylized "LA" and "21" at left	none	12345	1 to approximately 79000	
	1922	Embossed white serial on green plate with border line; stylized "LA" and "22" at left	none	123456	1 to 20000; 100001 to approximately 105000	Separate bases issued for vehicles up to 23 hp and for vehicles above this power; this practice continued through 1929. In all years, the base with low-numbered serials (starting from 1) was issued on the vehicles above 23 hp.
	1922	Embossed maroon serial on white plate with border line; stylized "LA" and "22" at left	none	123456	20001 to 100000	Separate bases issued for vehicles up to 23 hp and for vehicles above this power; this practice continued through 1929. In all years, the base with low-numbered serials (starting from 1) was issued on the vehicles above 23 hp.
	1923	Embossed black serial on gray plate with border line; "LA 23" at left	none	123456	1 to 30000	
	1923	Embossed white serial on black plate with border line; "LA 23" at left	none	123456	30001 to approximately 116000	
	1924	Embossed white serial on dark blue plate with border line; "LA 24" at right	none	123456	1 to 30000	
	1924	Embossed black serial on white plate with border line; "LA 24" at right	none	123456	30001 to approximately 143000	
	1925	Embossed red serial on gray plate with border line; "LA 25" at right	none	123456	1 to 40000	
	1925	Embossed white serial on maroon plate with border line; "LA 25" at right	none	123456	40001 to approximately 179000	
	1926	Embossed white serial on dark blue plate with border line; "LA-1926" centered at bottom	none	123-456	1 to 40-000; 200-001 to approximately 205-000	
	1926	Embossed maroon serial on white plate with border line; "LA-1926" centered at bottom	none	123-456	40-001 to 200-000	
	1927	Embossed white serial on green plate with border line; "LA-1927" centered at bottom	none	123-456	1 to 50-000	
	1927	Embossed black serial on cream plate with border line; "LA-1927" centered at bottom	none	123-456	50-001 to approximately 224-000	
	1928	Embossed white serial on dark blue plate with border line; "LA-1928" centered at bottom	none	123-456	1 to 70-000	
	1928	Embossed dark blue serial on white plate with border line; "LA-1928" centered at bottom	none	123-456	70-001 to approximately 232-000	
	1929	Embossed yellow serial on black plate with border line; "LOUISIANA 1929" at bottom, slightly offset to right; vertical "FRONT" or "REAR" at left	none	123-456	1 to 70-000; 234-001 to approximately 268-000	First use of the full state name.
	1929	Embossed black serial on orange plate with border line; "LOUISIANA 1929" at bottom, slightly offset to right; vertical "FRONT" or "REAR" at left	none	123-456	70-001 to 234-000	First use of the full state name.
	1930	Embossed yellow serial on green plate with border line; "LOUISIANA-30" centered at bottom; vertical "FRONT" or "REAR" at left	none	123-456	1 to approximately 254-000	
	1931	Embossed white serial on dark blue plate with border line; "LOUISIANA–1931" centered at top; vertical "FRONT" or "REAR" at left	none	123-456	1 to approximately 249-000	
	1932	Embossed white serial with pelican separator on red plate with border line; "LOUISIANA" centered at top; vertical "1932" at right and vertical "FRONT" or "REAR" at left	none	123-456	Issued in blocks by horsepower class and branch office	First base to feature a pelican in any form.
	1933	Embossed black serial with pelican separator on orange plate with border line; "LA–33" centered at top	none	123-456	Issued in blocks by horsepower class and branch office	
	1934	Embossed white serial with pelican separator on dark blue plate with border line; "LA" and "34" above and below pelican respectively	none	123-456	Issued in blocks by horsepower class and branch office	
	1935	Embossed yellow serial with pelican separator on purple plate with border line; "35" and "LA" above and below pelican respectively	none	123-456	Issued in blocks by horsepower class and branch office	
	1936	Embossed light blue serial with pelican separator on olive green plate with border line; "LOUISIANA–1936" centered at top	none	123-456	Issued in blocks by horsepower class and branch office	
	1937	Embossed golden yellow serial with pelican separator on maroon plate with border line; "LOUISIANA–1937" centered at bottom	none	123-456	Issued in blocks by horsepower class and branch office	
	1938	Embossed white serial with pelican separator on red plate with border line; "LOUISIANA–1938" centered at top	none	123-456	Issued in blocks by horsepower class and branch office	
	1939	Embossed orange serial with pelican separator on black plate with border line; "LOUISIANA–1939" centered at bottom	none	123-456	Issued in blocks by horsepower class and branch office	
	1940	Embossed dark blue serial with state-shaped separator on orange plate with border line; "LOUISIANA–1940" centered at top	none	123-456	Issued in blocks by horsepower class and branch office	
	1941	Embossed black serial with state-shaped separator on white plate with border line; "LOUISIANA–1941" centered at bottom	none	123-456	1-001 to approximately 406-000	
	1942–43	Embossed white serial with pelican separator on red plate with border line; "LOUISIANA–1942" centered at top	none	123-456	1-001 to approximately 384-000	Revalidated for 1943 with windshield stickers, due to metal conservation for World War II.
	1944	Black serial with pelican separator on yellow fiberboard plate; "LOUISIANA - 1944" centered at top	none	123-456	1-001 to approximately 380-000	Manufactured on soybean-based fiberboard due to ongoing metal conservation.
	1945	Embossed white serial with pelican separator on black plate with border line; "19 LOUISIANA 45" at top	none	123-456	1-001 to approximately 341-000	
	1946	Embossed black serial with pelican separator on white plate with border line; "19 LOUISIANA 46" at top	none	123-456	1-001 to approximately 337-000	
	1947	Embossed black serial with pelican separator on unpainted aluminum plate with border line; "19 LOUISIANA 47" at bottom	none	123-456	1-001 to approximately 356-000	
	1948	Embossed white serial with pelican separator on dark green plate with border line; "19 LOUISIANA 48" at top	none	123-456	1-001 to 380-000; 400-001 to approximately 410-000	
	1949	Embossed black serial with pelican separator on yellow plate with border line; "19 LOUISIANA 49" at bottom	none	123-456	1-001 to 380-000; 435-001 to approximately 485-000	
	1950	Embossed yellow serial on royal blue plate with border line; pelican decal used as separator; "19 LOUISIANA 50" at bottom	none	123-456	1-001 to 490-000; 550-001 to approximately 615-000	
	1951	Embossed yellow serial with pelican separator on dark green plate with border line; "LOUISIANA–1951" at bottom	none	123-456	1-001 to approximately 566-000	
	1952	Embossed white serial with pelican separator on dark green plate with border line; "19 LOUISIANA 52" at bottom	none	123-456	1-001 to approximately 590-000	
	1953	Embossed yellow serial with pelican separator on green plate with border line; "LOUISIANA-1953" at bottom	none	123-456	1-001 to approximately 638-000	
	1954	Embossed blue serial with pelican separator on beige plate with border line; "19" at bottom left and "54" at bottom right	"LOUISIANA-YAMS" centered at bottom	123-456	1-001 to approximately 700-000	
	1955	Embossed white serial with pelican separator on black plate with border line; "LOUISIANA 1955" at bottom	none	123-456	1-001 to approximately 740-000	First 6" x 12" plate.
	1956	Embossed white serial with pelican separator on dark green plate with border line; "19 LOUISIANA 56" at top	none	123-456	1-001 to approximately 801-000	
	1957	Embossed golden yellow serial with pelican separator on purple plate with border line; "LOUISIANA 1957" at bottom	none	123-456	1-001 to approximately 865-000	
	1958	Embossed white serial with pelican separator on red plate with border line; "19 LOUISIANA 58" at bottom	"SPORTSMEN'S PARADISE" at top	123-456	1-001 to approximately 880-000	
	1959	Embossed white serial with pelican separator on dark blue plate with border line; "19 LOUISIANA 59" at top	"SPORTSMAN'S PARADISE" at bottom	123-456	1-001 to approximately 910-000	
	1960	Embossed golden yellow serial with pelican separator on purple plate with border line; "19 LOUISIANA 60" at bottom	"LSU CENTENNIAL" at top	123-456	1-001 to approximately 934-000	
	1961	Embossed golden yellow serial with pelican separator on dark green plate with border line; "19 LOUISIANA 61" at bottom	"SPORTSMEN'S PARADISE" at top	123-456	1-001 to approximately 948-000	
	1962	Embossed white serial with pelican separator on brown plate with border line; "19 LOUISIANA 62" at bottom	"SPORTSMEN'S PARADISE" at top	123-456; 1234567	1-001 to approximately 1006000	Plates with seven-digit serials omitted the pelican. This happened again in 1963.
	1963	Embossed white serial with pelican separator on dark green plate with border line; "19 LOUISIANA 63" at bottom	"SPORTSMEN'S PARADISE" at top	123-456; 1234567	1-001 to approximately 1036000	Last base to feature the embossed pelican.

=== 1964 to present ===
Image	Dates issued	Design	Slogan	Serial format	Serials issued	Notes
	1964–65	Embossed white serial on dark blue plate with border line; "64 LOUISIANA 65" at bottom	"SPORTSMAN'S PARADISE" at top	123A456	Letter corresponds to State Police troop area of issue	
	1966–67	Embossed white serial on dark green plate with border line; "66 LOUISIANA 67" at bottom	"SPORTSMAN'S PARADISE" at top	123A456	Letter corresponds to State Police troop area of issue	
	1968–69	Embossed green serial on reflective white plate with border line; "68 LOUISIANA 69" at bottom	"SPORTSMAN'S PARADISE" at top	123A456	Letter corresponds to State Police troop area of issue	
	1970–71	Embossed red serial on reflective white plate with border line; "70 LOUISIANA 71" at bottom	"SPORTSMAN'S PARADISE" at top	123A456	Letter corresponds to State Police troop area of issue	
	1972–73	Embossed blue serial on reflective white plate with border line; "72 LOUISIANA 73" at bottom	"SPORTSMAN'S PARADISE" at top	123A456	Letter corresponds to State Police troop area of issue	
	1974–75	Embossed black serial on reflective white plate with border line; "LOUISIANA" centered at bottom; "74" at top left and "75" at top right	"BAYOU STATE" centered at top	123A456	Letter corresponds to State Police troop area of issue	
	1976–77	As above, but without years	"BAYOU STATE" centered at top	123A456	Letter corresponds to State Police troop area of issue	
	1978–83	As above, but without years	"SPORTSMAN'S PARADISE" at top	123A456	Letter corresponds to State Police troop area of issue	
	1983–84	Embossed dark blue serial on reflective white plate; logo of the 1984 World's Fair screened at bottom left; "Louisiana" screened in blue centered at top	"World's Fair" screened in blue centered at bottom	123A456	Letter corresponds to State Police troop area of issue	
	1984–89	Embossed dark blue serial on reflective white plate with border line; "LOUISIANA" centered at bottom	"SPORTSMAN'S PARADISE" at top	123A456	Letter corresponds to State Police troop area of issue	
	1989–93	Embossed dark blue serial on reflective white plate; screened dark blue graphics of mother pelicans with chicks at top corners; "LoUiSiAna" screened in red and dark blue (the 'U', 'S' and 'A' in dark blue) centered at bottom	"SPORTSMAN'S PARADISE" screened in red centered at top	123A456	Letter corresponds to State Police troop area of issue	Last base to use State Police troop area of issuance.
	1993 – December 31, 2001	Embossed dark blue serial on reflective white plate, with or without border line; "Louisiana" screened in red handwritten font centered at top	"SPORTSMAN'S PARADISE" screened in blue centered at bottom	ABC 123	AAA 000 to approximately KLK 999	Known as the "Lipstick" base. All 1974–93 plates were replaced with this design during 1995–96.
	January 1, 2002 – July; 2004	As 1993–2001 base, but with a screened blue compass graphic in the center containing a map of the contiguous U.S. with the area of the Louisiana Purchase highlighted	"Louisiana Purchase Bicentennial 1803-2003" screened in blue centered at bottom	ABC 123	KLL 000 to approximately MSN 999	Limited-run plate to commemorate the 200th anniversary of the Louisiana Purchase.
	July 2004 – February 2005	As 1993–2001 base	"SPORTSMAN'S PARADISE" as from 1993–2001	ABC 123	MSP 000 to approximately NFU 999	
	February 2005 – January 2, 2011	Embossed black serial on reflective white, yellow and pink gradient plate with black border line; screened pelican graphic in the center; "Louisiana" screened in red handwritten font centered at top	"Sportsman's Paradise" screened in red at bottom, offset to left	ABC 123	NFV 000 to approximately VCS 999	Initial plates featured a larger font for the state name. 'Q' and 'U' series of serials not used.
	January 3, 2011 – December 31, 2012	Embossed black serial on reflective white plate with pale green grass graphic and black border line; white pelican within green state shape screened at left; "Louisiana" screened in red handwritten font centered at top	"200 YEARS" screened in black centered at bottom, with "1812" and "2012" on small red banners at left and right respectively	ABC123	VCT000 to approximately WUG999	Limited-run plate to commemorate 200 years of statehood. Pelican and state shape later reduced in size.
	January 1, 2013 – January 2014	As 2005–11 base	"Sportsman's Paradise" as from 2005–11	ABC 123	WUH 000 to approximately XRZ 999	
	January 2014 – December 2015	Embossed dark blue serial on reflective white plate with border line; logo of the Battle of New Orleans Bicentennial Commission (featuring a bucking horse and rider) screened at left; "LOUISIANA" screened in red centered at top	"www.louisianatravel.com" screened in dark blue centered at bottom	ABC123	XSA000 to approximately ZPC999	Limited-run plate to commemorate the 200th anniversary of the Battle of New Orleans.
	January – May 2016	As 2005–11 base	"Sportsman's Paradise" as from 2005–11	ABC 123	ZPD 000 to ZZZ 999	
	May 2016 – December 31, 2024	As 2005–11 base	"Sportsman's Paradise" as from 2005–11	123 ABC	100 AAA to approximately 799 HUK	
	January 1, 2025 – present	Embossed dark blue serial on reflective white plate with border line; 18 stars circled around a map of Louisiana with a red background with America 250 logo below; "LOUISIANA" screened in red centered at top	"Sportman's Paradise"	123 ABC	100 HUL to 371 JCY (as of March 31, 2025)	

== Non-passenger plates ==
Image	Type	Design	First issued	Serial format	Notes
	Boat Trailer	Embossed blue on white with border line; "LOUISIANA" at bottom; "BOAT TRAILER" at top	unknown	D123456	Likely to have begun at D500000.
	Boat Trailer	As 1993–2001 passenger base, but with embossed "BOAT TRAILER" in place of slogan	c. 1993	D123456; K123456	
	Commercial	As 1993–2001 passenger base, but with embossed "COMMERCIAL" in place of slogan	c. 1993	A123456; N123456	
	Dealer	As 1993–2001 passenger base, but with embossed "DEALER" in place of slogan		DI12345	DI99999 followed by D/I100000 and up.
	Dealer	Embossed black on yellow with border line; "LOUISIANA" at top; "DEALER" at bottom	c. 2012	DI12345; D/I123456	DI99999 followed by D/I100000 and up.
	Motorcycle	Embossed red on white with border line; "LA." at bottom; "MOTORCYCLE" at top	1983	123456	
	Motorcycle	Similar to 1993–2001 passenger base; "MC" embossed at bottom	1995	123456	
	Private Truck	Embossed green on white with border line; "LOUISIANA" at bottom; "PRIVATE" at top	1978	A123456	T, R and part of S series issued.
	Private Truck	As 1993–2001 passenger base, but with embossed "PRIVATE" in place of slogan	c. 1993	A123456	Rest of S series issued, followed by V and part of W.
	Private Truck	As 1993–2001 passenger base, with screened "SPORTSMAN'S PARADISE" slogan	c. 2004	A123456	Rest of W series issued, followed by X and Y; issuing Z series as of October 2023.
	Tractor	"TRACTOR" embossed at top; weight of vehicle embossed in top right corner.	1963	123456	
	Truck	"TRUCK" embossed at top; weight of vehicle embossed in top right corner.	1966	B123456, now at C123456	
	Truck	"TRUCK" embossed at top; weight of vehicle embossed in top right corner.	1967	123456	
	Trailer	Embossed red on white with border line; "LOUISIANA" at bottom; "TRAILER" at top	mid 1980s	A123456	D series issued up to D499999 (higher numbers reserved for Boat Trailer), followed by part of E series.
	Trailer	As 1993–2001 passenger base, but with embossed "TRAILER" in place of slogan	c. 1993	A123456	Rest of E series issued; currently issuing L series.

== Optional plates ==
Optional plates do not use leading zeros in their serials.

Image	Type	Design	First issued	Serial format	Notes
	American Indian			A/I 1234	
	Animal Friendly			F/A 1234	
	Bring Back the Bobwhite			12	
	Chez Nous Autres "our home" in Cajun	French spelling "Louisiane" printed instead of English spelling "Louisiana"		C/Z 123	
	Choose Life			C/L 1234	
	Emergency Medical Technician				
	Firefighter—Retired			123	
	I'm Cajun ... and Proud!	Like the 1993 base plate but on the left has a Crawfish playing a Diatonic accordion with a Fleur-de-lis behind it.		12345	
	I'm Creole ... and Proud!			C/I 1234	
	"In God We Trust"			T/G 1234	
	Louisiana Tech University			123	
	Marine Corps League			12	
	New Orleans Pelicans				Introduced January 29, 2024.
	Our Environment...Our Future	Black on reflective light blue, white, and dark blue with multicolored graphic of pelican at right.		123; E/E 1234	
	"Preserve Our Hunting Heritage"			W/D 1234	
	Save the Louisiana Black Bear			B/B 1234	
	Sons of Confederate Veterans			C/V 1234	
	Special Olympics			12	
	Think Safe Kids			12	
	U.S. Veteran—Marine Corps	"USMC" printed diagonally to left of serial		M/A 1234	
	U.S. Veteran—Navy—Retired	"NAVY" printed diagonally and "RETIRED" printed horizontally to left of serial		123	

== Government plates ==
Image	Type	Design	First issued	Serial format	Notes
	Public	"PUBLIC" embossed vertically at left; "SPORTSMAN'S PARADISE" screened at bottom.		123456	
	Wildlife & Fisheries Enforcement			SF 12	

== State Police troop codes ==
From 1964 until 1993, Louisiana State Police troop area codes were used as part of the serial on the plate, invariably in the center of the serial. From 1993 until 1996, stickers were used to show the troop. This was done to give some idea of where the plates were issued. However, registrants who applied via the mail got plates with the "X" code, which was used for Baton Rouge.

Code	Troop or area
A	Baton Rouge
B	New Orleans (troop office in Kenner since 1995)
C	Raceland, (later Gray after troop office was moved in the mid 1970s)
D	Lake Charles
E	Alexandria
F	Monroe
G	Shreveport
H	Leesville (eliminated in 1988)
I	Lafayette
K	Opelousas (eliminated in 1988)
L	Covington
M	Raceland (eliminated in 1973)
N	New Orleans (overflow)
X	Baton Rouge/statewide mail
