= Vehicle registration plates of Wisconsin =

Wisconsin vehicle license plates

Wisconsin
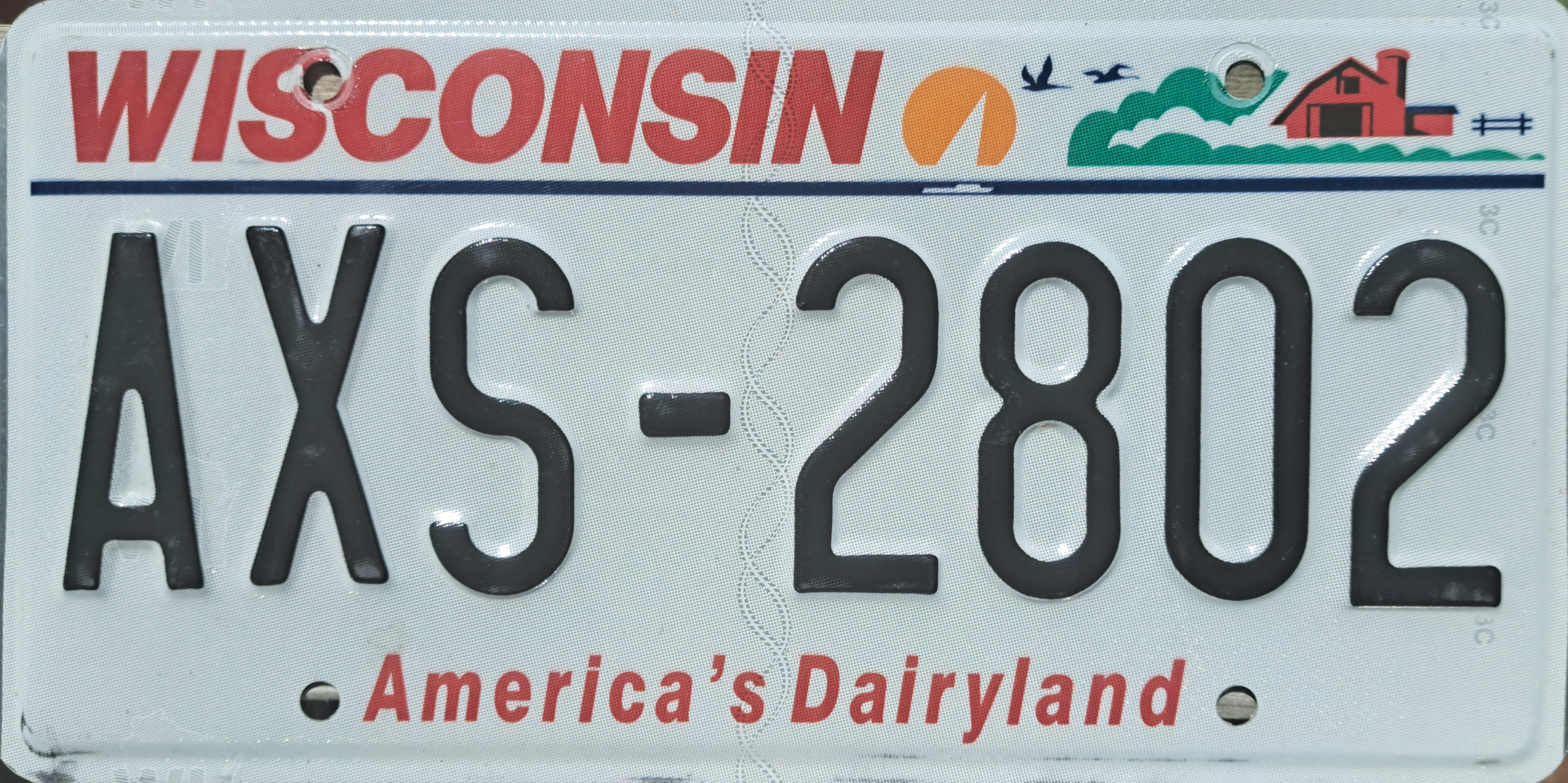

Current series
- Slogan: America's Dairyland
- Size: 12 in × 6 in 30 cm × 15 cm
- Material: Aluminum
- Serial format: ABC-1234 (2017-present); 123-ABC (2000-2017)
- Introduced: June 2000

Availability
- Issued by: Wisconsin Department of Transportation, Division of Motor Vehicles

History
- First issued: July 1, 1905

The U.S. state of Wisconsin first required its residents to register their motor vehicles and display license plates in 1905. As of 2026, plates are issued by the Wisconsin Department of Transportation (WisDOT) through its Division of Motor Vehicles. Front and rear plates are required for most classes of vehicles, while only rear plates are required for motorcycles and trailers.

== Passenger baseplates ==
=== 1905 to 1941 ===
Image	Dates issued	Design	Slogan	Serial format	Serials issued	Notes
	1905–11	Riveted aluminum serial on black plate	none	12345-W	1-W to 21983-W	
	1911	Riveted aluminum serial on dark green plate; vertical "1911" at left	none	1234W	1W to 1287W	First dated plate. Issued only to new registrants from August 1 through December 31, 1911.
	1912	Riveted aluminum serial on red plate; vertical "1912" at left	none	12345W	1W to approximately 24600W	
	1913	Riveted aluminum serial on dark blue plate; vertical "1913" at left	none	12345W	1W to approximately 34100W	
	1914	Embossed black serial on white plate; vertical "1914" at left	none	12345W	1W to approximately 53500W	First embossed plate.
	1915	Embossed white serial on black plate; "W 15" at right	none	12345	1 to approximately 79500	
	1916	Embossed red serial on white plate; vertical "WIS." and "16" at right	none	123456	1 to approximately 115000	
	1917	Embossed white serial on olive green plate; vertical "WIS." and "17" at right	none	123456	1 to approximately 165000	
	1918	Embossed black serial on beige plate with border line; "18 W" at right	none	123456	1 to approximately 185000	
	1919	Embossed yellow serial on green plate with border line; "W 19" at right	none	123456	1 to approximately 224000	
	1920	Embossed white serial on maroon plate; "W 20" at right	none	123456	1 to approximately 275000	
	1921	Embossed black serial on gray plate; vertical "WIS" and "21" at right	none	123-456	1 to approximately 320-000	
	1922	Embossed white serial on olive green plate; vertical "WIS" and "22" at right	none	123-456	1 to approximately 360-000	
	1923	Embossed red serial on white plate; vertical "WIS" and "23" at right	none	123-456	1 to approximately 419-000	
	1924	Embossed white serial on black plate; vertical "WIS" and "24" at right	none	A123-456	Coded by weight class (A)	
	1925	Embossed golden yellow serial on blue plate; vertical "WIS" at left and "25" at bottom right	none	123-456A	Coded by weight class (A)	
	1926	Embossed black serial on beige plate; "26" at bottom left and vertical "WIS" at right	none	A123-456	Coded by weight class (A)	
	1927	Embossed white serial on black plate; vertical "WIS" at left and "27" at bottom right	none	123-456A	Coded by weight class (A)	
	1928	Embossed black serial on orange plate; "28" at bottom left and vertical "WIS" at right	none	A123-456	Coded by weight class (A)	
	1929	Embossed white serial on green plate; vertical "WIS" at left and "29" at bottom right	none	123-456A	Coded by weight class (A)	
	1930	Embossed black serial on gray plate; "30" at bottom left and vertical "WIS" at right	none	A123-456	Coded by weight class (A)	
	1931	Embossed golden yellow serial on blue plate; vertical "WIS" at left and "31" at bottom right	none	123-456A	Coded by weight class (A)	
	1932	Embossed blue serial on yellow plate with border line; "WISCONSIN 32" at bottom	none	123456	1 to approximately 582000	First use of the full state name. Plates under 1000 used small plates through 1933.
	1933	Embossed white serial on dark blue plate with border line; "WISCONSIN 33" at top	none	123-456	1 to approximately 566-000	
	1934	Embossed black serial on white plate with border line; "WISCONSIN 34" at bottom	none	123-456	1 to approximately 578-000	Plates under 10000 used small plates through 1939
	1935	Embossed white serial on black plate with border line; "WISCONSIN 35" at top	none	123-456	1 to approximately 610-000	
	1936	Embossed green serial on white plate with border line; "36 WISCONSIN" at bottom	none	123-456	1 to approximately 667-000	
	1937	Embossed white serial on dark blue plate with border line; "37 WISCONSIN" at top	none	123-456	1 to approximately 714-000	
	1938	Embossed black serial on silver plate with border line; "WISCONSIN 1938" at bottom	none	123-456	1 to approximately 706-000	
	1939	Embossed white serial on black plate with border line; "WISCONSIN 1939" at top	none	123-456	1 to approximately 723-000	
	1940	Embossed red serial on white plate with border line; "WISCONSIN 1940" at top	"AMERICA'S DAIRYLAND" at bottom	123-456	1 to 430-350	First use of the "America's Dairyland" slogan.
	1940	As above, but with taller serial dies and vertical "WIS-40" used as separator	"AMERICA'S DAIRYLAND" at bottom	123-456	430-351 to approximately 747-000	First use of the "America's Dairyland" slogan.
	1941	Embossed black serial on golden yellow plate; "19 WISCONSIN 41" at bottom	"AMERICA'S DAIRYLAND" at top	123-456	1 to approximately 791-000	

=== 1942 to 1952 ===
Image	Dates issued	Design	Slogan	Serial format	Serials issued	Notes
	1942, 1943-45	Embossed golden yellow serial on black plate; "19 WISCONSIN 42" at bottom	"AMERICA'S DAIRYLAND" at top	123 456	1 to 772 000	Corners were rounded and plates were revalidated for 1943 with white tabs, for 1944 with green tabs, and for 1945 with white tabs, due to metal conservation for World War II. Front plates were removed and replaced with windshield stickers around 1943. Large plates stopped issuing at 720 000 in 1942 and resumed issuing in 1943.
	Late 1942-late 1943	Embossed golden yellow serial on black plate with border line; "WIS" at bottom left, embossed oval with debossed date in bottom right corner	none	A12, A1B, AB1, ABC, 12A, 1A2, 1AB, A123, 1A23	A00 to ZZZ, 00A to 9ZZ, A000 to Z999, 0A00 to 9K99	Plates were small to save metal for the war. Plates used every serial possible in a three digit format then overflowed to a four digit format; serial formats for three digit plates would progress from A00 to A09, then A0A and so on, treating the letters like numbers. I, L, M, O, Q, and W were not used in serials. Early plates were dated 1942 with the oval the same color as the serial, rest of plates were dated 43 and the oval was white. Plates were validated to 1945 with horizontal tabs in the same color as large plates.
	1946–49	Embossed white serial on black plate; "EXP WISCONSIN" at top, "46" or "47" at top right	"AMERICA'S DAIRYLAND" at bottom	1 12345; 1/0 12345	Coded by month of expiration (1 or 1/0)	Plates were set to expire between June 1946 and May 1947; later plates didn't have a "46" or "47" date designation. Plates were revalidated for 1947 with orange tabs, for 1948 with yellow tabs, for 1949 with green tabs, for 1950 with light blue tabs, for 1951 with white tabs, and for 1952 with golden yellow tabs.
	October 1949–52	As above, but with square corners and thinner serial dies	"AMERICA'S DAIRYLAND" at bottom	1 12345; 1 123-456; 1/0 12345; 1/0 123-456	Coded by month of expiration (1 or 1/0)	Validated for 1950, 1951 and 1952 in the same manner as for 1946–49 plates. Serials for each month continued from where these plates left off.

=== 1953 to 1967 ===
In 1956, the United States, Canada, and Mexico came to an agreement with the American Association of Motor Vehicle Administrators, the Automobile Manufacturers Association and the National Safety Council that standardized the size for license plates for vehicles (except those for motorcycles) at 6 inches (15 cm) in height by 12 inches (30 cm) in width, with standardized mounting holes. The 1956 (dated 1957) issue was the first Wisconsin license plate that complied with these standards.

Image	Dates issued	Design	Slogan	Serial format	Serials issued	Notes
	1953–54	Embossed black serial on golden yellow plate; "WIS" at top left; month of expiration and "53" at top right	"AMERICA'S DAIRYLAND" centered at bottom	A12-345	Letter corresponds to month of expiration (see right)	Letters A, B, C, D, E, H, J, K, L, P, T and V were used for January through December respectively; this practice continued through 1960. Revalidated for 1954 with red tabs.
	1955–56	Embossed green serial on white plate; "WIS" at top left; month of expiration and "55" at top right	"AMERICA'S DAIRYLAND" centered at bottom	A12-345; AK-1234	First letter corresponds to month of expiration	Two-letter serial format introduced in months where serials in the one-letter format had been exhausted. Revalidated for 1956 with yellow tabs. Late plates and remakes measured 6" x 12".
	1957–58	Embossed black serial on golden yellow plate; "WIS" at top left; month of expiration and "57" at top right	"AMERICA'S DAIRYLAND" centered at bottom	A12-345; AB-1234	First letter corresponds to month of expiration	First base plate where all plates are 6" x 12". Revalidated for 1958 with white tabs. K, L, and N used as overflow second letters through 1960.
	1959–60	Embossed dark green serial on white plate; "WIS" at top left; month of expiration and "59" at top right	"AMERICA'S DAIRYLAND" centered at bottom	A12-345; AB-1234	First letter corresponds to month of expiration	Revalidated for 1960 with orange tabs.
	1961–62	Embossed black serial on light yellow plate; "WIS" at top left; month of expiration and "61" at top right	"AMERICA'S DAIRYLAND" centered at bottom	A12-345	Letter corresponds to month of expiration	Two letters assigned for each month (A and B for January, C and D for February and so on up to Y and Z for December, with I and O excluded); this practice continued until 1986. Revalidated for 1962 with stickers.
	1963–64	Embossed blue serial on white plate; "WIS" at top left; month of expiration and "63" at top right	"AMERICA'S DAIRYLAND" centered at bottom	A12-345	Letter corresponds to month of expiration	Revalidated for 1964 with stickers.
	1965–67	Embossed white serial on maroon plate; "WIS" at top left; month of expiration and "65" at top right	"AMERICA'S DAIRYLAND" centered at bottom	A12-345	Letter corresponds to month of expiration	Revalidated for 1966 and 1967 with stickers.

=== 1968 to present ===
Image	Dates issued	Design	Slogan	Serial format	Serials issued	Notes
	1968–72	Embossed black serial on reflective yellow plate; month of expiration, "WISCONSIN" and debossed "68" at bottom	"AMERICA'S DAIRYLAND" centered at top	A12-345; AB 1234	First letter corresponds to month of expiration	
	1973–79	Embossed red serial on reflective white plate; month of expiration, "WISCONSIN" and debossed "73" at bottom	"AMERICA'S DAIRYLAND" centered at top	A12-345; AB 1234	First letter corresponds to month of expiration	
	1980 – June; 1986	As 1968–72 base, but with debossed "80" at bottom right	"AMERICA'S DAIRYLAND" centered at top	A12-345; AB 1234	First letter corresponds to month of expiration	Revalidated until 1993.
	July; 1986 – March 1987	Embossed dark blue serial on reflective white plate; "WISCONSIN" screened in dark blue at top left and graphics screened at top right featuring a sailboat and sunset, flying geese, and a farm scene; green and dark blue lines separating state name and graphics from serial	"America's Dairyland" screened in dark blue centered at bottom	ABC-123	AAA-101 to AZZ-999	Recalled starting in August 1993 and replaced with plates with red serials (below). Letters I, O and Q not used in serials; this practice continues today.
	March 1987 – December 1994	As above, but with red serial	"America's Dairyland" screened in dark blue centered at bottom	ABC-123	BAA-101 to NMD-999	Serial changed from dark blue to red in response to concerns of confusion with Illinois plates of the time.
	December 1994 – June; 2000	As above, but with red serial	"America's Dairyland" screened in dark blue centered at bottom	ABC-123	NME-101 to WRE-999	Narrower dies. All plates with red serials replaced by the end of 2014.
	June 2000 – April; 2017	As above, but with black serial, red state name, graphics revised and green line removed	"America's Dairyland" screened in red centered at bottom	123-ABC	101-AAA to 999-ZZZ	Baseplate design updated. In May 2024, an orange EV HYBRID sticker applied to the top right corner of the front and rear plates became compulsory for electric and hybrid vehicle owners to provide clarity for first responders in an accident.
	April 2017 – present	As above, but with black serial, red state name, graphics revised and green line removed	"America's Dairyland" screened in red centered at bottom	ABC-1234	AAA-1001 to BDK-2558 (as of 4/13/26)	Baseplate design updated. In May 2024, an orange EV HYBRID sticker applied to the top right corner of the front and rear plates became compulsory for electric and hybrid vehicle owners to provide clarity for first responders in an accident.

== Specialty plates ==
Image	Type	Dates issued	Design	Slogan	Serial format	Serials issued	Notes
	Amateur Radio	ca. 2000 to present	As standard passenger base, but with "Amateur Radio" in place of slogan	Amateur Radio	Owner's FCC radio call sign (4-6 characters)		Operator's can put call sign plate on all vehicles owned
	Blood donation (Versiti)	2021–present	Embossed white serial on a multi-colored gold-to-red-to-purple background with Versiti logo to left and the rightmost part of the background; WISCONSIN rendered in gold, logo and slogan text in white	Donation Saves Lives (left) Beacon of Hope (lower)	12345VS	10001VS to 10258VS (as of December 31, 2023)	
	Collector	1972–present	Embossed red serial on a blue background	Collector	123456	1 to present	Collector plates are issued to vehicles 20 years old or older with no major modifications. Plates do not expire once issued and do not require registration stickers. The owner must also have one regularly licensed motor vehicle in Wisconsin in order to receive Collector plates. Collector plates are not valid during the month of January. Subsequent Collector plates issued to the same owner will feature an "A", "B", etc. appended to the initial Collector plate number.
	Children's Trust Fund	1999–present	Red on white with multicolored image of child with "Children's Trust Fund" at left.	Celebrate Children	12345K	10001K to present	
	Ducks Unlimited	2001–present	Embossed black serial on white plate; graphic screened at left featuring yellow state shape, green Ducks Unlimited logo and black silhouettes of flying ducks; "WISCONSIN" screened in red centered at top	"Ducks Unlimited" screened in red centered at bottom	D12345	D10001 to present	
	Emergency Medical Services	2011–present	Embossed black serial on white plate: Service sticker on left featuring the Star of Life; "WISCONSIN" screened in red centered at top	Emergency Medical Services screened in red centered at bottom; red accents across top or bottom available per driver election	12345EM	10001EM to 11315EM (as of December 31, 2023)	Issued to active and licensed emergency medical technicians, along with former EMTs retired due to an injury suffered on duty
	Endangered Resources	1995-2006	Embossed red serial on white plate with wolf image at left	Endangered Resources	12345E	10001E to approximately 42925E	
	Endangered Resources	2007–present	As above, but with black text	Endangered Resources	12345E	43000E to 60694E (as of September 2, 2024)	
	Endangered Resources	2010-2015	Screened black serial on plate with various graphics including a badger	Endangered Resources	12345E/R	10001E/R to 13110E/R	
	Endangered Resources	2015–present	Embossed black serial on plate with eagle graphic as background	Endangered Resources	12345E/R	13151E/R to 18421E/R (as of September 2, 2024	
	Fleet	2023–present	Embossed black serial on plate with screened green-and-blue waves background	America's Dairyland; FLEET	12345AF/T	10001AF/T to 26500AF/T (as of April 27, 2024)	Starting in 2023, Wisconsin introduced a new fleet plate option for entities operating ten or more standard or light-truck vehicles. This plate does not require registration stickers and can be renewed online.
	Ice Age Trail	2023–present	Embossed black serial on two-tone blue and yellow background with a woolly mammoth at left.	IceAgeTrail.org	12345A/T	10001A/T to 10630A/T (as of January 12, 2024)	
	Milwaukee Brewers (Glove Logo)	2010–2020	Embossed white serial on blue plate; Brewers glove logo graphic screened at left.	Milwaukee Brewers	1234AB	1001AB to present	
	Milwaukee Brewers (Glove Logo)	2020–present	Embossed white serial on dark blue plate; Brewers glove logo graphic screened at left.	Brew Crew	12345A/B	10001A/B to present	The plate was redesigned in 2020 to match the Brewers' new branding.
	Milwaukee Brewers (M Logo)	2010–2020	Embossed white serial on dark blue plate; Brewers "M" logo graphic screened at left.	Milwaukee Brewers	1234AC	1001AC to present	
	Milwaukee Brewers (M Logo)	2020–present	Embossed white serial on dark blue plate; Brewers "M" logo graphic screened at left.	Milwaukee Brewers	12345A/C	10001A/C to present	The plate was redesigned in 2020 to match the Brewers' new branding.
	Sesquicentennial of Wisconsin's statehood	1997 – January 1, 1999, with remakes made until August 1, 2008	Embossed red serial on lake scene.	1848 WISCONSIN 1998; SESQUICENTENNIAL	12345T	10001T to 99999T	Awarded "Plate of the Year" for best new optional license plate of 1997 by the Automobile License Plate Collectors Association, the first and, to date, only time Wisconsin has been so honored. Co-recipient with Manitoba.
	Sesquicentennial of Wisconsin's statehood	1997 – January 1, 1999, with remakes made until August 1, 2008	Embossed red serial on lake scene.	1848 WISCONSIN 1998; SESQUICENTENNIAL	A1234T	A1001T to Z9999T	Awarded "Plate of the Year" for best new optional license plate of 1997 by the Automobile License Plate Collectors Association, the first and, to date, only time Wisconsin has been so honored. Co-recipient with Manitoba.
	Sesquicentennial of Wisconsin's statehood	1997 – January 1, 1999, with remakes made until August 1, 2008	Embossed red serial on lake scene.	1848 WISCONSIN 1998; SESQUICENTENNIAL	AB123T	AA101T to DW999T	Awarded "Plate of the Year" for best new optional license plate of 1997 by the Automobile License Plate Collectors Association, the first and, to date, only time Wisconsin has been so honored. Co-recipient with Manitoba.
	Salutes Veterans	2006–present	Embossed black serial on white plate; graphic screened at left featuring an eagle, American flag and the Wisconsin flag.	"Salutes Veterans"	12345Y	10001Y to 12277Y (as of May 8, 2021)	
	Spay/Neuter/Adopt	May 2024 — present	Embossed black serial on a rural farm background; a dog, cat, and rabbit are shown at left.	"SPAY-NEUTER-ADOPT"	12345S/N	10001S/N to 10039S/N (as of June 12, 2024	
	Suicide Prevention Foundation	May 2024 — present	Embossed white serial on green-to-blue gradient background; a lifebuoy is shown at the left, with the organization name between the lifebuoy and the serial.	"Save Lives. Bring Hope."	12345P/F	10001P/F to 10002P/F (as of June 12, 2024	
	Whitetails Unlimited	2017–present	Embossed black serial on deer and forest printed backdrop.	"Whitetails Unlimited"	12345W/U	10001W/U to 17219W/U (as of May 7, 2021)	An additional $25 donation with registration fee provides funding for Whitetails Unlimited, a group that provides resources for the conservation of whitetail deer.
	Green Bay Packers	2001–present	Embossed black serial on yellow plate; graphic screened at left featuring Green Bay Packers logo.	"Green Bay Packers"	12345G	10001G to 38528G (as of March 31, 2021)	An additional $25 donation with registration fee provides funding for Lambeau Field.
	Harley Davidson	2011–present	Embossed black serial on black, grey and orange plate; graphic screened at left Harley-Davidson's symbol.	"Share The Road"	12345H/D	10001H/D to 15139H/D (as of November 2026)	An annual $25 donation with registration fee provides funding towards motorcycle and moped safety and training programs.
	Nurses Change Lives	2019–present	Embossed black serial on white plate, red heart and stethoscope graphic at left.	"Nurses Change Lives"	12345W/N	10001W/N to 10110W/N (as of August 31, 2020)	An annual $25 donation with registration fee provides funding towards the Wisconsin Organization of Nurse Executives.
	Road America	2021–present	Embossed white serial on black, black and white plate; graphic screened at left is a northward rendering of the track's circuit map.	Road America	12345RA	10001RA to 20000RA (as of December 31, 2023)	Most issued specialty plate of 2023 behind only hobbyist/collector plates and military service plates.

== Non-passenger plates ==
=== Light truck and bus plates ===
Image	Type	Dates issued	Design	Serial format	Serials issued	Notes
	Bus	1988-1994	Embossed red serial on reflective white plate; "WISCONSIN" at bottom, "BUS" at top	A/B 123	Coded by weight class (A)	
	Bus	1995-2004	As 1987-2000 passenger base, but with embossed red "BUS" in place of slogan	A/B 123	Coded by weight class (A)	Bottom letter is a constant "B"
	Bus	2004–present	As current passenger base, but with embossed black "BUS" in place of slogan	12345B	1001B to 32555B (as of October 19, 2024)	
	Farm Truck	1994–2004	As 1987–2000 passenger base, but with embossed red "FARM" in place of slogan	123456F	1001F to approximately 140000F	All Farm Truck plates expire at the end of February in even-numbered years. Narrower serial dies introduced 2001 when 100000F was reached.
	Farm Truck	2004–08	As current passenger base, but with red serial, plus embossed red "FARM" in place of slogan	123456F	140001F to approximately 162000F	All Farm Truck plates expire at the end of February in even-numbered years. Narrower serial dies introduced 2001 when 100000F was reached.
	Farm Truck	2008–present	As above, but with black serial and "FARM", plus embossed "FEB" at bottom left	123456F	200001F to 318450F, 348451F to 376781F (as of March 22, 2025)	All Farm Truck plates expire at the end of February in even-numbered years. Narrower serial dies introduced 2001 when 100000F was reached.
	Light Truck	1987–94	Embossed blue serial on tan plate; "WISCONSIN" at bottom and "TRUCK" at top; debossed "88" at bottom right	A/B12-345	Coded by weight class (A)	Weight classes are as follows: A (4,500 lb and under), B (4,501 to 6,000 lb) and C (6,001 lb to 8,000 lb). In the AB1234 serial format, serials AW1001 through DF9999 were skipped to avoid confusion with Temporary plates. Personalized plates also issued.
	Light Truck	1995–2000	As 1987–2000 passenger base, but with embossed red "TRUCK" in place of slogan	A/B12-345	Coded by weight class (A)	Weight classes are as follows: A (4,500 lb and under), B (4,501 to 6,000 lb) and C (6,001 lb to 8,000 lb). In the AB1234 serial format, serials AW1001 through DF9999 were skipped to avoid confusion with Temporary plates. Personalized plates also issued.
	Light Truck	2000–04	As current passenger base, but with embossed black "TRUCK" in place of slogan, plus sticker for weight class at left	123456	100001 to 999999	Weight classes are as follows: A (4,500 lb and under), B (4,501 to 6,000 lb) and C (6,001 lb to 8,000 lb). In the AB1234 serial format, serials AW1001 through DF9999 were skipped to avoid confusion with Temporary plates. Personalized plates also issued.
	Light Truck	2004–present	As current passenger base, but with embossed black "TRUCK" in place of slogan, plus sticker for weight class at left	AB1234	AA1001 to AV9999; DG1001 to WA1659 (as April 12, 2025)	Weight classes are as follows: A (4,500 lb and under), B (4,501 to 6,000 lb) and C (6,001 lb to 8,000 lb). In the AB1234 serial format, serials AW1001 through DF9999 were skipped to avoid confusion with Temporary plates. Personalized plates also issued.

=== Heavy truck and trailer plates ===
Image	Type	Dates issued	Design	Serial format	Serials issued	Notes
	Apportioned	1999-2000	Embossed red serial on white plate; "APPORTIONED" and "WISCONSIN" centered at top and bottom respectively; debossed "99" at bottom right	12345	101 to 54164	Weight classes are truck and heavy truck weight classes. Weight classes are indicated by a letter sticker
	Apportioned	2001-2018	As above but with "APPORTIONED" at bottom and "WISCONSIN" at top and no debossed "99" at bottom right	12345	65909 to 99999	Weight classes are truck and heavy truck weight classes. Weight classes are indicated by a letter sticker
	Apportioned	2001-2018	As above but with "APPORTIONED" at bottom and "WISCONSIN" at top and no debossed "99" at bottom right	12345A	101W to 99999W	Weight classes are truck and heavy truck weight classes. Weight classes are indicated by a letter sticker
	Apportioned	2001-2018	As above but with "APPORTIONED" at bottom and "WISCONSIN" at top and no debossed "99" at bottom right	12345A	10001X to 79999X	Weight classes are truck and heavy truck weight classes. Weight classes are indicated by a letter sticker
	Apportioned	2018–present	As above but with a black serial instead of a red serial	12345A	80000X to 99999X	Weight classes are truck and heavy truck weight classes. Weight classes are indicated by a letter sticker
	Apportioned	2018–present	As above but with a black serial instead of a red serial	12345A	10001Z to 80000Z (as of October 2024)	Weight classes are truck and heavy truck weight classes. Weight classes are indicated by a letter sticker
	Trailer	1992-93	Embossed green serial on white plate; "TRAILER" and "WISCONSIN" centered at top and bottom respectively; "92" at bottom right	A/B1234	Coded by weight class (A)	Weight classes are truck and heavy truck weight classes
	Trailer	1994-2008	Embossed black serial on light teal plate; "TRAILER" and "WISCONSIN" centered at top and bottom respectively; "94" at bottom right	A/B12345	Coded by weight class (A)	Bottom letters (B) started at R then overflowed to T
	Trailer	2009–present	Embossed black serial on gray plate; "TRAILER" and "WISCONSIN" centered at top and bottom respectively	A/B12345	Coded by weight class (A)	A Y weight class (14,000 lb) was added in 2009. C and Y weight class trailer plates started at C/A and Y/A respectively, while other trailer plates started where the 1994 series left off
	Heavy Truck	1992–93	Embossed green serial on white plate; "TRUCK" and "WISCONSIN" centered at top and bottom respectively; "92" at bottom right	A/B1234	Coded by weight class (A)	Weight classes are as follows: X (10,000 lb), D (12,000 lb), E (16,000 lb), F (20,000 lb), G (26,000 lb), H (32,000 lb), J (38,000 lb), K (44,000 lb), L (50,000 lb), M (54,000 lb), N (56,000 lb), P (62,000 lb), Q (68,000 lb), R (73,000 lb), S (76,000 lb), and T (80,000 lb).
	Heavy Truck	1994–2008	Embossed black serial on light teal plate; "TRUCK" and "WISCONSIN" centered at top and bottom respectively; "94" at bottom right	A/B12345	Coded by weight class (A)	Weight classes are as follows: X (10,000 lb), D (12,000 lb), E (16,000 lb), F (20,000 lb), G (26,000 lb), H (32,000 lb), J (38,000 lb), K (44,000 lb), L (50,000 lb), M (54,000 lb), N (56,000 lb), P (62,000 lb), Q (68,000 lb), R (73,000 lb), S (76,000 lb), and T (80,000 lb).
	Heavy Truck	2009–present	Embossed black serial on gray plate; "TRUCK" and "WISCONSIN" centered at top and bottom respectively	A/B12345	Coded by weight class (A)	Weight classes are as follows: X (10,000 lb), D (12,000 lb), E (16,000 lb), F (20,000 lb), G (26,000 lb), H (32,000 lb), J (38,000 lb), K (44,000 lb), L (50,000 lb), M (54,000 lb), N (56,000 lb), P (62,000 lb), Q (68,000 lb), R (73,000 lb), S (76,000 lb), and T (80,000 lb).
	Heavy farm truck	1992-1993	Embossed green serial on white plate; "FARM" and "WISCONSIN" centered at top and bottom respectively; "FEB" embossed at top right, "93" debossed at bottom right	A/F1234	Coded by weight class	Issued to farm trucks over 12,000lbs. Weight classes are heavy truck weight classes from E upward.
	Heavy farm truck	1994-2008	Embossed black serial on teal plate; "FARM" and "WISCONSIN" centered at top and bottom respectively; "FEB" embossed at top right; "95" or "94" debossed at bottom right	A/F12345	Coded by weight class	Serials start at AF30001. Early plates had a debossed "95" at bottom right, later plates had a debossed "94" at bottom right.
	Heavy farm truck	2009–Present	Embossed black serial on gray plate; "FARM" and "WISCONSIN" centered at top and bottom respectively	A/F12345	Coded by weight class	
	Farm Trailer	1992-1993	Embossed green serial on white plate; "FARM TRAILER" and "WISCONSIN" centered at top and bottom respectively; "DEC" embossed at top right, "92" debossed at bottom right	A/F1234	Coded by weight class	Serials start at AF1001. Weight classes are same as trailer weight classes.
	Farm Trailer	1994-2008	Embossed black serial on teal plate; "FARM TRAILER" and "WISCONSIN" centered at top and bottom respectively; "DEC" embossed at top right, "94" debossed at bottom right	A/F12345	Coded by weight class	Serials start at AF5001
	Farm Trailer	2009–Present	Embossed black serial on gray plate; "FARM TRAILER" and "WISCONSIN" centered at top and bottom respectively; "DEC" embossed at top right	A/F12345	Coded by weight class	
	Light Trailer	2000–present	As current passenger base, but with embossed black "TRAILER" in place of slogan	12345Z/A	1001Z/A to 15522Z/A (as of March 7, 2024)	Optional plates for regular trailers weighing 3,000 lb or less, and for rental trailers weighing 4,500 lb or less.
	Semi-Trailer	1987–present	Embossed black serial on orange plate; "SEMI TRAILER" and "WISCONSIN" centered at top and bottom respectively	123456	200001 to 860392 (as of October 7, 2024)	
	Tractor	1992-1993	Embossed green serial on white plate; "TRACTOR" and "WISCONSIN" centered at top and bottom respectively; "92" at bottom right	A/B1234	Coded by weight class (A)	Weight classes are truck and heavy truck weight classes
	Tractor	1994–2008	Embossed black serial on light teal plate; "TRACTOR" and "WISCONSIN" centered at top and bottom respectively; "94" at bottom right	A/S12345	Coded by weight class (A)	Weight classes are truck and heavy truck weight classes
	Tractor	2009–present	Embossed black serial on gray plate; "TRACTOR" and "WISCONSIN" centered at top and bottom respectively	A/S12345	Coded by weight class (A)	Weight classes are truck and heavy truck weight classes

=== Motorcycle and moped plates ===
Image	Type	Dates issued	Design	Serial format	Serials issued	Notes
	Autocycle	2020-August 2022	Embossed black serial on white plate; "WIS APR" screened at bottom offset to left, "AUTOCYCLE" screened at top; year sticker at bottom right	123A4	101A1 to approximately 220B1	All plates expire April 30 annually
	Autocycle	September 2022 – present	Embossed black serial on white plate; "WIS" at bottom, "AUTOCYCLE" at top	123A4	101C1 to 417C1 (As of May 2024)	
	Moped	1992–2004	Embossed green serial on white plate; "WIS", year sticker and "MOPED" at bottom; vertical "APR" in center	12 34	10 01 to 99 99	All moped plates expire on April 30 in even-numbered years.
	Moped	1992–2004	Embossed green serial on white plate; "WIS", year sticker and "MOPED" at bottom; vertical "APR" in center	12 3A	10 1A to 99 9Z	All moped plates expire on April 30 in even-numbered years.
	Moped	1992–2004	Embossed green serial on white plate; "WIS", year sticker and "MOPED" at bottom; vertical "APR" in center	A1 23	A1 01 to Z9 99	All moped plates expire on April 30 in even-numbered years.
	Moped	1992–2004	Embossed green serial on white plate; "WIS", year sticker and "MOPED" at bottom; vertical "APR" in center	A1 2B	A1 1A to E9 9Z	All moped plates expire on April 30 in even-numbered years.
	Moped	July 2004–present	Embossed black serial on white plate; "WISCONSIN" at top; year sticker and "MOPED" at bottom; vertical "APR" at left	A1 2B	F1 1A to Z9 9Z	All moped plates expire on April 30 in even-numbered years.
	Moped	July 2004–present	Embossed black serial on white plate; "WISCONSIN" at top; year sticker and "MOPED" at bottom; vertical "APR" at left	A123B	A101A to D444J (as of April 5, 2023)	All moped plates expire on April 30 in even-numbered years.
	Motorcycle	1992–2003	Embossed green serial on white plate; "WIS", year sticker and "APR" at bottom.	12345	1 to 99999	All motorcycle plates expire on April 30 in even-numbered years.
	Motorcycle	1992–2003	Embossed green serial on white plate; "WIS", year sticker and "APR" at bottom.	A1234	A101 to Z9999	All motorcycle plates expire on April 30 in even-numbered years.
	Motorcycle	1992–2003	Embossed green serial on white plate; "WIS", year sticker and "APR" at bottom.	AB123	AA101 to KU999	All motorcycle plates expire on April 30 in even-numbered years.
	Motorcycle	April 2003 – 2024	Embossed black serial on white plate; "WISCONSIN" at top; "APR" and year sticker at bottom	AB 123	KV 101 to ZZ 999	All motorcycle plates expire on April 30 in even-numbered years.
	Motorcycle	April 2003 – 2024	Embossed black serial on white plate; "WISCONSIN" at top; "APR" and year sticker at bottom	1234 A	1001 A to 9999 Z	All motorcycle plates expire on April 30 in even-numbered years.
	Motorcycle	April 2003 – 2024	Embossed black serial on white plate; "WISCONSIN" at top; "APR" and year sticker at bottom	123 AB	101 AA to 999 VZ, 101XA to 999XZ, 101 WA to 999 WZ, 101YA to approximately 999YG?	All motorcycle plates expire on April 30 in even-numbered years.
	Motorcycle	October 2024 – present	As above, but with a shortened state name of "WIS"	123 AB	101YH? to 999 ZZ	All motorcycle plates expire on April 30 in even-numbered years.
	Motorcycle	October 2024 – present	As above, but with a shortened state name of "WIS"	A123BC	A101AA to A178AA (As of October 1, 2025	All motorcycle plates expire on April 30 in even-numbered years.

=== Governmental plates ===
Image	Type	Dates issued	Design	Serial format	Serials issued	Notes
	Municipal	1957	Embossed red serial on cream plate; "WIS" at top left, "57" at top right; "MUNICIPAL" at bottom	12345	1 to approximately 16000	Only rear plates issued.
	Municipal	1969-1988	Embossed black serial on blue plate; "WISCONSIN" at bottom, "MUNICIPAL" at top	12345	5001 to approximately 65000	Only rear plates issued.
	Municipal	1989–2019	Embossed black serial on straw-colored plate; "MUNICIPAL" and "WISCONSIN" centered at top and bottom respectively	12345	5001 to 99999	Only rear plates issued.
	Municipal	2019–present	Embossed black serial on straw-colored plate; "MUNICIPAL" and "WISCONSIN" centered at top and bottom respectively	C12345	C10001 to C27194 (as of August 6, 2024)	Only rear plates issued.
	Official	1989–present	Embossed black serial on straw-colored plate; embossed hollow star at left; "OFFICIAL" and "WISCONSIN" centered at top and bottom respectively	12345	3 to 99999	Serials 1 and 2 reserved for the Governor and Lieutenant Governor respectively; plates with these serials have a second hollow star at the right. Most 1 and 2 plates are unused official souvenir plates
	Official	1989–present	Embossed black serial on straw-colored plate; embossed hollow star at left; "OFFICIAL" and "WISCONSIN" centered at top and bottom respectively	A1234	A101 to F2275 (as of November 27, 2023)	Serials 1 and 2 reserved for the Governor and Lieutenant Governor respectively; plates with these serials have a second hollow star at the right. Most 1 and 2 plates are unused official souvenir plates
	State Owned	1981–present	Embossed white serial on red plate, "STATE OWNED" and "WISCONSIN" centered at top and bottom respectively	12345	1001 to 20055 (as of June 14, 2024)	Only rear plates issued.
	State Patrol		Blue on blue-to-white shaded graphic with Wisconsin State Patrol logo	123		
	State Patrol Motorcycle		Blue on white with Wisconsin State Patrol logo	1		

=== Dealer plates ===
Image	Type	Dates issued	Design	Serial format	Notes
	Dealer	2011-2018	Embossed black serial on aluminum plate; "DEALER" and "WISCONSIN" embossed at top and bottom respectively	M/V 1234	Motorcycle dealer plates use motorcycle-sized plates with no prefix, RV dealer plates use an "R/V" prefix in place of an "M/V" prefix, and from 2011-2018 trailer dealer plates used a "T/L" prefix and from 2018 onward used a "W/T" prefix and used a "TRAILER DEALER" caption
	Dealer	2018–present	Embossed black serial on aluminum plate; "DEALER" and "WISCONSIN" embossed at top and bottom respectively	M/V 1234A	Motorcycle dealer plates use motorcycle-sized plates with no prefix, RV dealer plates use an "R/V" prefix in place of an "M/V" prefix, and from 2011-2018 trailer dealer plates used a "T/L" prefix and from 2018 onward used a "W/T" prefix and used a "TRAILER DEALER" caption
	Demonstrator	2011-2018	As dealer plate but with "DEMONSTRATOR" in place of caption and embossed "DEC" in lower left corner	T/T 12345	Used on truck demonstrations in excess of 8,000 lbs. Trailer demonstrator plates use a T/L prefix
	Demonstrator	2018–present	As dealer plate but with "DEMONSTRATOR" in place of caption and embossed "DEC" in lower left corner	T/K 12345	Used on truck demonstrations in excess of 8,000 lbs. Trailer demonstrator plates use a T/L prefix
	Wholesaler	2011-2018	As dealer plate but with "WHOLESALER" in place of caption	M/V 1234	Used by people who buy and then resell used vehicles
	Wholesaler	2018–present	As dealer plate	W/H 1234A	Used by people who buy and then resell used vehicles
	Distributor	2011-2018	As dealer plate but with "DISTRIBUTOR" in place of caption	M/V 1234	Used on vehicles in transit from vehicle manufacturers to vehicle dealerships
	Distributor	2018–present	As dealer plate	W/D 1234A	Used on vehicles in transit from vehicle manufacturers to vehicle dealerships
	Transporter	2011-2018	As demonstrator plate but with "TRANSPORTER" in place of caption	M/V 1234	Used on vehicles in transit "on their own wheels" or "under their own power"
	Transporter	2018–present	As demonstrator plate but with "TRANSPORTER" in place of caption	W/P 12345	Used on vehicles in transit "on their own wheels" or "under their own power"
	Manufacturer	2011-2018	As dealer plate but with "MANUFACTURER" caption	M/V 1234	Used on vehicle manufacturers to test or demonstrate vehicles. Motorcycle manufacturer plates are also issued.
	Manufacturer	2018–present	As dealer plate	W/M 1234A	Used on vehicle manufacturers to test or demonstrate vehicles. Motorcycle manufacturer plates are also issued.
	Finance Company	2011-2018	As dealer base, but with "FINANCE CO" in place of caption	M/V 1234	Used by financial institutions moving or demonstrating repossessed vehicles
	Finance Company	2018–present	As dealer base, but with "FINANCE CO" in place of caption	W/F 12345	Used by financial institutions moving or demonstrating repossessed vehicles

=== Miscellaneous ===
Image	Type	Dates issued	Design	Serial format	Serials issued	Notes
	Disabled	1988-2000	As 1988-2000 passenger base, but with embossed red International Symbol of Access at right	DIS1234	DIS1001 to DIS9999	
	Disabled	1988-2000	As 1988-2000 passenger base, but with embossed red International Symbol of Access at right	DISA123	DISA101 to DISZ999	
	Disabled	1988-2000	As 1988-2000 passenger base, but with embossed red International Symbol of Access at right	DIS AB12	DIS A1 to approximately DIS CZ99	
	Disabled	1988-2000	As 1988-2000 passenger base, but with embossed red International Symbol of Access at right	12345D	10001D to ?	
	Disabled	2000–12	As current passenger base, but with embossed black International Symbol of Access at right	12345D	30001D to 99999D	
	Disabled	2012–present	As current passenger base, but with embossed black International Symbol of Access at right	12345D/S	10001D/S to 67454D/S (as of July 24, 2023)	
	Disabled veteran	1988-1992	As 1988 passenger base	VET1234	VET 1 to at least VET2938	
	Disabled veteran	1992-2009	Embossed red serial on light blue base; "DISABLED VETERAN" and "WISCONSIN" screened in blue at top and bottom respectively, stacked "VET" prefix and wheelchair symbol screened in red at left and right respectively.	VET1234	VET 1 to VET 6634	
	Disabled veteran	2009 to present	Embossed blue serial on red-white-blue gradient base; "WISCONSIN" and "DISABLED VETERAN" screened in white ovals at top and bottom respectively	12345V	10001V to 13868V (as of 2015)	
	Human services vehicle	1988-2000	As 1988-2000 passenger base	ZYA-123	ZYA-101 to approximately ZYE-999	Used on vehicles transporting elderly or disabled people.
	Human services vehicle	2000–present	As current passenger base	123-ZYA	101-ZYA to 439-ZYJ (as of 2025)	Used on vehicles transporting elderly or disabled people.
	Low Speed	2007–present	Embossed black serial on turquoise plate; "LOW SPEED" and "WISCONSIN" at top and bottom respectively	1234 L/S	1001 L/S to 2733 L/S (as of July 3, 2024)	
	Motor Home	1987–95	As 1987–2000 passenger base, but with screened dark blue "Motor Home" in place of slogan	12345	10001 to 70000	
	Motor Home	1995–2004	As above, but with narrower serial dies and "MOTOR HOME" embossed in red	12345	70001 to 99999	
	Motor Home	1995–2004	As above, but with narrower serial dies and "MOTOR HOME" embossed in red	A1234	A1001 to B3999	
	Motor Home	2005–08	As current passenger base, but with red serial and "MOTOR HOME"	A1234	B8000 to D9999	
	Motor Home	2008–present	As above, but with black serial and "MOTOR HOME" as from 2000–01	A1234	E1001 to approximately F9999, B4051 to B8000, G1001 to M3736 (as of April 16, 2024)	
	Special-X	1998-2004	As 1994-2000 passenger base, but with "SPECIAL-X" embossed in place of slogan	1234 S/P	1001 S/P to 6400 S/P	Used on non-profit organization vehicles. All plates back to 1998 are valid and currently in use. Plates are revalidated every 5 years
	Special-X	2004 to present	As above, but with revised graphics	1234 S/P	6401 S/P to 7845 S/P (as of July 5, 2024)	Used on non-profit organization vehicles. All plates back to 1998 are valid and currently in use. Plates are revalidated every 5 years
	Temporary	2004–19	Red serial on white cardboard plate; state outline in center; "WISCONSIN TEMPORARY" in blue at top; expiration date written at bottom right	A12 34B	A10 01A to P24 66U (as of August 7, 2018)	Discontinued on December 31, 2019.
	Temporary	2020–present	White serial surrounded by black box on white paper plate. "WISCONSIN TEMPORARY PLATE" printed above, with vehicle information to the left, expiration date to the right and the last 6 VIN digits on the bottom. Affixed to the inside of rear windshield.	A1234B, A1234BE	X1687E (as of October 7, 2024), D8604KE (as of February 29, 2024)	Both serial versions issued and in use.

=== Discontinued ===
Image	Type	Dates Issued	Design	Serial Format	Serials Issued	Notes
	Apportioned semi trailer	1999-2001	Embossed black serial on yellow plate; "WISCONSIN" and "APPORTIONED" at top and bottom respectively	S/T12345	S/T10001 to approximately S/T31000	According to the Wisconsin Department of Transportation, plates are now treated as non-expiring semi trailer plates. Discontinued after California dropped the requirement for apportioning trailers
	BX bus	1993-1998	As 1988 passenger base, but with embossed red "BX BUS" in place of slogan and "98" date designation	1234 BX	1001 BX to ?	Used on privately owned urban mass transit vehicles. BX bus plates were merged into bus plates in 2004, and these vehicles now receive bus plates with 5-year registration cycles expiring on December 30.
	BX bus	1998-2003	As above, but without the date designation	1234 BX	4001 BX to 4206 BX	Used on privately owned urban mass transit vehicles. BX bus plates were merged into bus plates in 2004, and these vehicles now receive bus plates with 5-year registration cycles expiring on December 30.
	Dual purpose farm	1988-1994	Embossed dark blue serial on tan plate; "DUAL PURPOSE FARM" and "WISCONSIN" centered at top and bottom respectively; embossed "JAN" and debossed "88" at bottom left and bottom right respectively (some early plates had a border line)	AZ 1234	Coded by weight class. Letter progression goes in reverse alphabetical order (AZ 1001-AZ 9999, then AY 1001 and so on, using the letters Z, Y, W, and V)	Issued to trucks used for farm and non-farm purposes. All bases from 1988 onward were revalidated through 2009.
	Dual purpose farm	1994-2004	As 1994 passenger base, but with embossed red "DUAL PURP FARM" in place of slogan	AZ 1234	Coded by weight class. Serial picked up where the 1988 base left off	Issued to trucks used for farm and non-farm purposes. All bases from 1988 onward were revalidated through 2009.
	Dual purpose farm	2004	As current passenger base, but with red serial and embossed red "DUAL PURP FARM" in place of slogan	AZ 1234	Coded by weight class	Issued very briefly before the series was discontinued in October 2004
	Dual purpose vehicle	1988-1994	As 1988 dual purpose farm base, but with embossed "DUAL PURPOSE VEH" in place of caption	123456	600001 to approximately 625999	Issued to trucks with slide-in camper trailers.
	Dual purpose vehicle	1994-2004	As 1994 passenger base, but with embossed red "DUAL PURP VEH" in place of slogan	123456	626001 to approximately 632200	Issued to trucks with slide-in camper trailers.
	Driver education	1993-1998	As 1988 passenger base, but with embossed red "DRIVER ED" in place of slogan	1234DE	1001DE to approximately 1900DE	Older plates from 1998 are still valid and in use as of 2024. Driver education vehicles are currently issued passenger plates with 5-year expirations.
	Driver education	1998-2004	As above, but without the date designation	1234 D/E	4001 D/E to 4895 D/E	Older plates from 1998 are still valid and in use as of 2024. Driver education vehicles are currently issued passenger plates with 5-year expirations.
	School bus	1993-1998	As 1988 passenger base, but with embossed red "SCHOOL BUS" in place of slogan and "98" date designation	12345	1001 to approximately 16500	School bus plates were merged into bus plates in 2004, though they still can be identified by inspection stickers.
	School bus	1998-2004	As above, but without the date designation	12345S/B	40001S/B to 55950S/B	School bus plates were merged into bus plates in 2004, though they still can be identified by inspection stickers.
	Special-UX	1992-1994	Embossed green serial on white plate; "SPECIAL-UX" and "WISCONSIN" embossed at top and bottom respectively; debossed "92" at bottom right	AX 1234	Coded by weight class	Used on trucks and trailers with specific permanently mounted equipment. 1994 plates started at A/X 1001.
	Special-UX	1994-2004	Embossed black serial on light teal plate; "SPECIAL-UX" and "WISCONSIN" embossed at top and bottom respectively; debossed "94" at bottom right	AX 1234	Coded by weight class	Used on trucks and trailers with specific permanently mounted equipment. 1994 plates started at A/X 1001.
	Special-Z	1992-1994	Embossed green serial on white plate; "SPECIAL-Z" and "WISCONSIN" embossed at top and bottom respectively; debossed "92" at bottom right	A/Z 1234	Coded by weight class	Used on empty equipment in transit, particularly excavating and carnival vehicles. 1994 plates started at A/Z 1001.
	Special-Z	1994-2004	Embossed black serial on light teal plate; "SPECIAL-Z" and "WISCONSIN" embossed at top and bottom respectively; debossed "94" at bottom	A/Z 1234	Coded by weight class	Used on empty equipment in transit, particularly excavating and carnival vehicles. 1994 plates started at A/Z 1001.
	For Hire	1988-2000	As 1988 passenger base.	ZZA-123	ZZA-101 to at least ZZA-458	Phased out in favor of passenger plates around 2004. Issued for use on automobiles used for hire under authority of the Transportation Commission, most commonly taxis and shuttle vehicles.
	For Hire	2000-2004?	As current passenger base.	123-ZZA	101-ZZA to 638-ZZA	Phased out in favor of passenger plates around 2004. Issued for use on automobiles used for hire under authority of the Transportation Commission, most commonly taxis and shuttle vehicles.

=== Tribal plates ===
Tribal and Indian nation plates are given to members and nonmembers who reside on their respective reservation. Plates also usually bear special-design expiration stickers unavailable to the rest of the state or other reservations, except for Ho-Chunk nation plates, which use standard Wisconsin expiration stickers.

Additionally, most reservations issue non-passenger plates. Truck plates generally start with "T", except for Oneida and Menominee, which use various other prefixes to denote trucks. Most reservations also have motorcycle plates available, and some also issue motorhome plates. Disabled plates are available for multiple reservations, as well as disabled veteran plates. Some also issue plates specifically for municipal and tribal government vehicles.

Image	Tribe	Dates Issued	Design	Serial Format	Serials Issued	Notes
	Bad River Band of Lake Superior Chippewa	2006 - c. 2018	Embossed black serial on red graphic plate, "BAD RIVER BAND" screened on top and "LAKE SUPERIOR CHIPPEWA" screened in white below.	A123	A001 to approximately A850	
	Bad River Band of Lake Superior Chippewa	c. 2019	Embossed black serial on white to blue gradient plate; "Bad River Tribe" screened at top above two blue waves, "Of Lake Superior Chippewa Indians" and "WI" screened at bottom, and tribal seal screened at left	A123	c. A851 to A899	
	Bad River Band of Lake Superior Chippewa	2020 to 2024	As above, but with the serial screened	A123	c. A901 to A999	
	Bad River Band of Lake Superior Chippewa	2020 to 2024	As above, but with the serial screened	BR123	BR100 to BR299	
	Bad River Band of Lake Superior Chippewa	2024 to present	Embossed black serial on blue, white, and red graphic plate	BR123	c. BR 300 to BR 393 (as of October 5, 2025)	
	Ho-Chunk Nation of Wisconsin	2020–present	Embossed blue serial on blue, white, and green graphic plate.	1234HC	1000HC to 1046HC (As of September 12, 2025)	
	Lac Courte Oreilles Band of Lake Superior Chippewa Indians	2010–Present	Screened black serial on white graphic plate with eagle to the left. "LAC COURTE OREILLES" screened in red at top and "OJIBWE NATION" screened in white inside red box below, or, "VETERAN" screened in red inside white box below.	A123	A101 to B962 (As of October 4, 2025)	
	Lac du Flambeau Band of Lake Superior Chippewa	1994–Present	Embossed blue serial, later a black serial and later a screened black serial on red, white and blue graphic plate, "LAC DU FLAMBEAU" screened on top in white and "OJIBWE NATION" screened in white below. Optional "VETERAN" screened vertically in black at left.	1234, T123 or T1234	1001 to approximately 6079, T101 to approximately T1019	
	Menominee Tribe/de facto Menominee County	1980-1990	Embossed blue serial on white plate with embossed thunderbird symbol to left. "WIS" screened in blue at top and "MENOMINEE NATION" screened in blue below.	A123	A001 to at least E343	
	Menominee Tribe/de facto Menominee County	1990-1996	As 1980-1990 base with inverted colors.	A123	A101 to at least C543	
	Menominee Tribe/de facto Menominee County	1996-2000	Embossed black serial on sky and nature scene graphic plate. "WIS" screened in white at top and "MENOMINEE NATION" screened in white below.	A1234	A0100 to at least A2490	
	Menominee Tribe/de facto Menominee County	2000- c. 2021	Revised graphics from 1996 base. "WISCONSIN" now screened on top.	A1234	A0100 to at least A11147	
	Menominee Tribe/de facto Menominee County	c. 2021 to present	Embossed black serial on white plate; "WISCONSIN" screened at top, "OMĀĒQNOMENĒWAK" screened at bottom	1234	1 to 2273 (As of September 12, 2025)	
	Oneida Nation of Wisconsin	1999-2004	Embossed purple serial on white plate with eagle, pine tree and turtle at left. "ONEIDA NATION" screened in purple in top right.	7G-1234	7G-1001 to at least 7G-2769	
	Oneida Nation of Wisconsin	2004-2017	Embossed black serial on white and purple graphic plate with clan symbols at left. "ONEIDA NATION" screened in purple above and clan sticker screened in purple below.	3C1234	3C1001 to at least 3C4496	
	Oneida Nation of Wisconsin	2004-2017	Embossed black serial on white plate with eagle at left. "ONEIDA NATION" screened in white inside purple box-like graphic in top right.	6N1234	6N1001 to at least 6N3299	Regular passenger car
	Oneida Nation of Wisconsin	2004-2017	Embossed black serial on white plate with eagle at left. "ONEIDA NATION" screened in white inside purple box-like graphic in top right.	MH-123	MH-101 to at least MH-115	Motor home
	Oneida Nation of Wisconsin	2017 to present	Embossed white serial on black plate; purple band at top with white "ONEIDA NATION" screened at top, clan symbol screened at left, and clan slogan screened at bottom	BC1234	BC1001 to BC1061 (As of 2018)	Bear clan
	Oneida Nation of Wisconsin	2017 to present	Embossed white serial on black plate; purple band at top with white "ONEIDA NATION" screened at top, clan symbol screened at left, and clan slogan screened at bottom	TC1234	TC1001 to TC1266	Turtle clan
	Oneida Nation of Wisconsin	2017 to present	Embossed white serial on black plate; purple band at top with white "ONEIDA NATION" screened at top, clan symbol screened at left, and clan slogan screened at bottom	WC1234		Wolf clan
	Red Cliff Band	2012 to present	White serial screened on graphic base depicting a cliff on Lake Superior; "Red Cliff Band" screened at top, "Lake Superior Chippewa" screened at bottom, and tribal seal screened in middle behind serial	R12345	R00001 to R01057 as of (October 4, 2025)	
