= Vehicle registration plates of Arizona =

Arizona vehicle license plates

Arizona
Current series
- Slogan: Grand Canyon State
- Size: 12 in × 6 in 30 cm × 15 cm
- Material: Aluminum
- Serial format: XXX 1XX (2021-present); XXX1XXX (2020-2021); ABC1234 (2008-2020); 123·ABC (1996-2008)
- Introduced: 1996 (current flat-printed version introduced in 2008)

Availability
- Issued by: Arizona Department of Transportation, Motor Vehicle Division

History
- First issued: January 1, 1914 (pre-state plates from 1912 to December 31, 1913)

The U.S. state of Arizona first required its residents to register their motor vehicles in 1912. Registrants provided their own license plates for display until 1914, when the state began to issue plates.

Plates are issued by the Arizona Department of Transportation (ADOT) through its Motor Vehicle Division (MVD). Only rear plates have been required since 1989.

In Arizona, the license plate belongs to the vehicle owner. This allows for the transfer of a plate from one vehicle to another.

The existing style was introduced in 1996 and was designed by Walter Punzmann.

== Passenger baseplates ==
=== 1914 to 1955 ===
Image	Dates issued	Design	Slogan	Serial format	Serials issued	Notes
	1914	Embossed white serial on blue plate; "ARIZ 1914" at right	none	1234	1 to approximately 5000	
	1915	Embossed black serial on white plate; "ARIZ 1915" at right	none	1234	1 to approximately 7500	
	1916	Embossed black serial on copper plate with border line; vertical "ARIZ" and "1916" at left and right respectively	none	12345	1 to approximately 12500	
	1917	Embossed white serial on black plate; embossed steer head graphic at left with "ARIZ" above and "1917" below	none	12345	1 to approximately 20000	
	1918	Embossed dark blue serial on olive-gray plate; "1918 ARIZ" at right	none	12345	1 to approximately 24000	
	1919	Embossed white serial on black plate with border line; "ARIZ 1919" at left	none	12345	1 to approximately 29000	
	1920	Embossed black serial on white plate with border line; vertical "ARIZ" and "1920" at left and right respectively	none	12345	1 to approximately 35000	
	1921	Embossed white serial on black plate with border line; stylized "ARIZ" and "21" at right	none	12345	1 to approximately 36000	
	1922	Embossed green serial on white plate with border line; vertical "ARIZ" and "1922" at left and right respectively	none	1-12345; 10-1234	Coded by county of issuance (1 or 10)	
	1923	Embossed dark blue serial on white plate with border line; stylized vertical "ARIZ" and "23" at left	none	1-12345; 10-1234	Coded by county of issuance (1 or 10)	
	1924	Embossed white serial on dark blue plate with border line; "24" and stylized vertical "ARIZ" at left	none	1-12345; 10-1234	Coded by county of issuance (1 or 10)	
	1925	Embossed black serial on copper plate with border line; "ARIZONA" at bottom, offset to left; vertical "1925" at right	none	1-12345; 10-1234	Coded by county of issuance (1 or 10)	First use of the full state name.
	1926	Embossed black serial on white plate with border line; "ARIZONA" at bottom, offset to left; vertical "1926" at right	none	1-12345; 10-1234	Coded by county of issuance (1 or 10)	
	1927	Embossed black serial on copper plate with border line; "ARIZONA" at bottom, offset to left; vertical "1927" at right	none	1-12345; 10-1234	Coded by county of issuance (1 or 10)	
	1928	Embossed red serial on copper plate with border line; "ARIZONA" at bottom, offset to right; vertical "1928" at left	none	1-12345; 10-1234	Coded by county of issuance (1 or 10)	
	1929	Embossed slanted orange serial on black plate with border line; slanted "19 ARIZ 29" centered at bottom	none	123-456	Issued in blocks by county	
	1930	Embossed slanted black serial on white plate; slanted "ARIZONA" and "1930" centered at top and bottom respectively; letter at top left denoting county of issuance	none	12-34-56	Issued in blocks by county	
	1931	Embossed slanted black serial on orange plate; slanted "1931" and "ARIZONA" centered at top and bottom respectively; letter at top left denoting county of issuance	none	12-34-56	Issued in blocks by county	
	1932	Embossed slanted white serial on copper plate; slanted "ARIZONA-1932" at top	none	1AB1; 1A1B; AA12; A1A2	Coded by county of issuance (1 or A)	
	1933	Debossed slanted copper serial within embossed black rectangle on copper plate; slanted "ARIZONA-1933" at bottom	none	1AB1; 1A1B; AA12; A1A2	Coded by county of issuance (1 or A)	
	1934	Debossed slanted copper serial within embossed light blue rectangle on copper plate; slanted "ARIZONA-1934" at top	none	1AB1; 1A1B; AA12; A1A2	Coded by county of issuance (1 or A)	
	1935	Embossed slanted black serial within black rectangular outline on copper plate; slanted "ARIZONA-1935" at bottom	none	1AB1; 1A1B; AA12; A1A2	Coded by county of issuance (1 or A)	
	1936	Embossed black serial on copper plate; vertical "ARIZ" and "1936" at left and right respectively; county name centered at bottom	none	1A B1; 1A 1B; AA 12; A1 A2	Coded by county of issuance (1 or A)	
	1937	Embossed black serial on copper plate with border line; "ARIZONA-37" and county name centered at top and bottom respectively	none	A1-234	Coded by county of issuance (A)	
	1938	Embossed black serial on yellow plate with border line; "ARIZONA-38" and county name centered at top and bottom respectively	none	A1234	Coded by county of issuance (A)	
	1939	Embossed black serial on copper plate; "ARIZONA" centered at top; vertical "1539" and "1939" at left and right respectively	"MARCOS DE NIZA" centered at bottom	A12345	Coded by county of issuance (A)	Commemorated the 400th anniversary of the expedition of Fray Marcos de Niza.
	1940	Embossed dark blue serial on white plate; "ARIZONA-40" centered at top	"GRAND CANYON STATE" at bottom	A12345	Coded by county of issuance (A)	First use of the "Grand Canyon State" slogan.
	1941	Embossed black serial on copper plate; "ARIZONA-41" centered at bottom	"GRAND CANYON STATE" at top	A12345	Coded by county of issuance (A)	
	1942–44	Embossed black serial on white plate; "42-ARIZONA" centered at top	"GRAND CANYON STATE" at bottom	A123; 1A234; 12A345	Coded by county of issuance (A)	Revalidated for 1943 and 1944 with windshield stickers, due to metal conservation for World War II.
	1945–46	Embossed black serial on white plate; "ARIZ. 45" centered at top	none	A1234	Coded by county of issuance (A)	Revalidated for 1946 with windshield stickers.
	1947	Embossed red serial on unpainted aluminum plate; "ARIZ. 47" centered at top	"GRAND CANYON STATE" centered at bottom	A/B 1234	Coded by county of issuance (A/B)	
	1948	Embossed black serial on unpainted aluminum plate; "ARIZ. 48" centered at top	"GRAND CANYON STATE" centered at bottom	A/B 1234	Coded by county of issuance (A/B)	
	1949	Embossed green serial on waffle-textured unpainted aluminum plate; "ARIZONA 49" centered at top	"GRAND CANYON STATE" centered at bottom	A-12345	Coded by county of issuance (A)	
	1950–51	Embossed black serial on white plate; "ARIZONA 50" centered at top	"GRAND CANYON STATE" centered at bottom	A-12345	Coded by county of issuance (A)	Revalidated for 1951 with aluminum tabs.
	1952–53	Embossed white serial on black plate; "ARIZONA 52" centered at top	"GRAND CANYON STATE" centered at bottom	A-12345	Coded by county of issuance (A)	Revalidated for 1953 with black tabs.
	1954–55	Embossed black serial on white plate; "ARIZONA 54" centered at top	"GRAND CANYON STATE" centered at bottom	A-12345	Coded by county of issuance (A)	Revalidated for 1955 with aluminum tabs.

=== Since 1956 ===
In 1956, the United States, Canada, and Mexico came to an agreement with the American Association of Motor Vehicle Administrators, the Automobile Manufacturers Association, and the National Safety Council that standardized the size for license plates for vehicles (except those for motorcycles) at 6 inches (15 cm) in height by 12 inches (30 cm) in width, with standardized mounting holes. The 1955 (dated 1956) issue was the first Arizona license plate that complied with these standards.

Image	Dates issued	Design	Slogan	Serial format	Serials issued	Notes
	1956–58	Embossed white serial on black plate with border line; "ARIZONA 56" centered at top	"GRAND CANYON STATE" centered at bottom	A-12345	Coded by county of issuance (A)	Revalidated for 1957 and 1958 with stickers.
	1959–60	Embossed white serial on blue plate with border line; "ARIZONA 59" centered at top	"GRAND CANYON STATE" centered at bottom	ABC-123	AAA-001 to approximately BDY-999	Revalidated for 1960 with stickers. Letters I, O and Q not used in serials; this practice continued through 1965.
	1961–63	Embossed blue serial on white plate with border line; "ARIZONA 61" centered at top	"GRAND CANYON STATE" centered at bottom	ABC-123	CAA-001 to approximately DMC-999	Revalidated for 1962 and 1963 with stickers.
	1964–65	Embossed white serial on blue plate with border line; "ARIZONA 64" centered at top	"GRAND CANYON STATE" centered at bottom	ABC-123	EAA-001 to approximately FMJ-999	Revalidated for 1965 with stickers.
	1966–68	Embossed black serial on reflective white plate with border line; "ARIZONA 66" centered at top	"GRAND CANYON STATE" centered at bottom	ABC-123	HAA-001 to JZZ-999; NAA-001 to approximately NEF-999	Revalidated for 1967 and 1968 with stickers. Letters I, O, Q and U not used in serials; this practice continues today.
	1969–72	Embossed black serial on reflective yellow plate with border line; "ARIZONA 69" centered at top	"GRAND CANYON STATE" centered at bottom	ABC-123	KAA-001 to MZZ-999; YAA-001 to approximately YDF-999	Revalidated for 1970, 1971, and 1972 with stickers.
	1973–80	Embossed green serial on reflective pale orange plate with border line; "ARIZONA 73" centered at top	"GRAND CANYON STATE" centered at bottom	ABC-123	PAA-001 to approximately WNJ-999	Revalidated with stickers until 1990.
	1980–96	Embossed reflective white serial with saguaro cactus separator on maroon plate with border line; "ARIZONA" centered at top	"GRAND CANYON STATE" centered at bottom	ABC-123	AAA-001 to approximately NXG-200	Front and rear plates issued until around the ETT series (1989); rear plates only thereafter. Still currently revalidated.
Embossed standard Arizona car registration plate 2005	1996 – January 2008	Embossed dark green serial on reflective graphic plate with desert scene featuring turquoise, white, and orange gradient sky, white setting sun and purple mountains (in the shape of Four Peaks) and cacti; "ARIZONA" screened in turquoise, with white outlines, centered at top	"GRAND CANYON STATE" screened in dark green below serial, offset to right	123·ABC	001·AAA to 999·ZZZ	Awarded "Plate of the Year" for best new license plate of 1996 by the Automobile License Plate Collectors Association, the first time Arizona was so honored.
	January 2008 – April 2020	As above, but with serial screened, security threads added to center of plate, and saguaro cactus added to the left of the serial	"GRAND CANYON STATE" screened in dark green below serial, offset to right	ABC1234	AAA0001 to approximately CWX9999	CWL0001 to CWX9999 used on rental cars since 2020.
	April 2020 – January 2021	As above, but with serial screened, security threads added to center of plate, and saguaro cactus added to the left of the serial	"GRAND CANYON STATE" screened in dark green below serial, offset to right	Various formats, including ABC1DEF (Note: Order of progression: DFB1CEA. Because of the non-standard nature of the serials, sixty-four serial formats were available, though only eight were used. Read from left to right in a conventional format: ABC1DEF; A1B2CDE; ABC1D2E; A1B2C3D; 1AB2CDE; 12A3BCD; 1AB2C3D; 12A3B4C)	AAA0AAA to approximately SXA6DTA (as of August 19, 2021)	Also called "Alphabet Soup" plates, this switch occurred after ADOT introduced a new computer coding system for plates, the old system having dated from the mid-1980s. These were reported as "random" combinations but actually increment in a non-standard order. Except for the fourth digit in each plate, which is always a number, all other positions can be either letters or numbers; each position uses the letters A–Z followed by the numbers 0–9.
	February 2021 – present	As above, but with serial screened, security threads added to center of plate, and saguaro cactus added to the left of the serial	"GRAND CANYON STATE" screened in dark green below serial, offset to right	Various formats, including ABC 1DE (Note: Order of progression: CEA 1DB. Because of the non-standard nature of the serials, thirty-two serial formats are available.)	AAA 0AA to LPA 1B9 (as of November 10, 2026)	Also called "Alphabet Soup" plates, this switch occurred after ADOT introduced a new computer coding system for plates, the old system having dated from the mid-1980s. These were reported as "random" combinations but actually increment in a non-standard order. Except for the fourth digit in each plate, which is always a number, all other positions can be either letters or numbers; each position uses the letters A–Z followed by the numbers 0–9.

== County coding ==
County	1922-23	1924-28	1930-31	1932-36	1937-38	1939-44
Maricopa	1	1	A	1-7	A-E	A
Cochise	2	2	B	8, 9	G	C
Pima	3	3	C	A-E	J, K	B
Gila	4	4	D	F, G	M	F
Yavapai	5	5	E	H, J, K	N	D
Yuma	6	6	F	L, N	R	E
Pinal	7	7	G	P, R	S	G
Graham	8	8	H	S	T	K
Santa Cruz	9	9	J	T	U	N
Mohave	10	10	K	U	V	L
Coconino	11	11	L	V	W	H
Navajo	12	12	M	X	X	J
Apache	14	14	N	Y	Y	P
Greenlee	13	15	P	Z	Z	R

Note: La Paz County was not formed until 1983, by which time the county-coding policy had ended.

== Non-passenger plates ==
=== Since 1997 ===
Image	Type	First issued	Design	Serial format	Notes
	Alternative Fuel – Government		Blue on sky and clouds graphic	GA·12345	
	Alternative Fuel – Passenger	April 1997	Blue on sky and clouds graphic	AF·1234; AF·123A; AF·12A3; AF12A3; AF1A23; 1A23AF	Early plates had a lighter-colored background. Serials became screened at around AF·00P1, and lost the separator at around AF00S1. High # as of April 22, 2020: 7M77AF
	Alternative Fuel – hybrid vehicle	2008	Blue on sky and clouds graphic	12L N34; 123 LN4	Issuance ceased at 99L N99.
	Amateur Radio		As passenger base. Starting in 1955, a radio tower graphic appears to the left of the serial, and "GRAND CANYON STATE" is replaced with "AMATEUR RADIO OPERATOR"	FCC call sign	One of the earliest special plates that was still available as of February 2013.
	Apportioned		As passenger base, but with "APPORTIONED" in place of slogan	AB·12345; AB12345	Began at AA·00001. AC series reserved for optional It Shouldn't Hurt to Be a Child plate, and AF series skipped to avoid confusion with Alternative Fuel passenger plates. Serials became screened midway through the AD series, and lost the separator at the start of the AH series. High # as of May 25, 2024: AM50695.
	Commercial	October 1997	As passenger base	CB·12345; CB12345	Began at CA·00001. Serials became screened early in the CF series, and lost the separator at the start of the CK series. High # as of June 22, 2022: CN65743.
	Disabled Person	1996	As passenger base	-1ABC	Large wheelchair embossed to left of serial with hyphen. First series used older dies.
	Disabled Person	1997	As passenger base	ABC12	Small wheelchair embossed to left of serial. First series used older dies.
	Historic Vehicle	1977	All-embossed red on copper	12A; 1A2; 1234; ABC1; 12AB; 123A; 12A3; 1A23	Dated-1977 base issued continuously since then. Latest serial is 12AB.
	Manufacturer		As passenger base	MT-1234	
	Motorcycle	1996	Similar to passenger base	M/C ABC1; M/C 1ABC; M/C AB1C; M/C A1BC; M/C 1A2B; M/C A12B	
	Trailer	1997	As passenger base	A-12345; 12345-A	Letters J through Y (excluding O, Q and U) were used in the A-12345 format. Serials became screened late in the T series.
	Transporter		As passenger base	XP-123A	

=== 1980 to 1996 ===
Image	Type	Design	Serial format	Notes
	Apportioned	As passenger base, but with "APPORTIONED" in place of slogan	12A-345	
	Commercial	As passenger base	1AB-234	
	Trailer	As passenger base, but with "TLR." to left of state name	A-12345	Letters D, E, F and G were used.

== Optional plates ==
Arizona offers its motorists a number of optional issue designs that are available upon the payment of an additional fee. Below is a partial list.

Image	Type	First issued	Serial format	Notes
	Arizona Agriculture	2010	1AG2345	
	Arizona Centennial	October 30, 2011	A1234Z; A1234C	Awarded "Plate of the Year" for best new license plate of 2011 by the Automobile License Plate Collectors Association, the second time Arizona was so honored.
	Arizona Diamondbacks	April 4, 2007	DB12345	Redesigned in 2016.
	Arizona Highways Magazine	early 2009	1AH2345	
	Arizona Historical Society	June 2007	AH123	Redesigned in 2020.
	Arizona Science Center	2018	12345SC	
	Arizona State University	1989	A1234 C1234 (series halted early for Pet plates) D1234 F1234	Redesigned in 2010 and 2018.
	Choose Life	early 2009	12CL34	
	Conserving Wildlife	2002	W/A12345	Redesigned in 2010.
	Curing Childhood Cancer	2012	12345CR	
	Donate Life/Be an Organ Donor	approx 2005	B1ABC	
	Early Detection Saves Lives	March 26, 2006	JK1234	
	Ending Hunger	2011	12345HR	
	Environmental	October 1, 1992	E1234 1234E 123E4 12E34 1E234 EA·1234 (counting up from EV)	Originally had yellow serial; this was changed to black due to poor visibility. Redesigned version available December 27, 1994.
	Former Prisoner of War		A12	
	Fraternal Order of Police		L/E1234	
	Freedom	January 14, 2007	1FR2345	
	Gold Star Family	May 2009	B123	Serials are surface-printed.
	Historic Route 66	December 19, 2016	RT1234	Awarded "Plate of the Year" for best new license plate of 2016 by the Automobile License Plate Collectors Association, the third time Arizona was so honored.
	Home of the Apache	March 2007	C123E4	San Carlos Apache.
	Honoring Fallen Officers	November 2007	FP12345	Serials are surface-printed. Red starburst design removed after FP05500 to improve visibility.
	It Shouldn't Hurt to Be a Child		AC·12345	
	It Shouldn't Hurt to Be a Child – Disabled Person		AC·1234	Wheelchair embossed to left of serial.
	Keep It Beautiful	2013	A1234B	Redesigned in 2024.
	Live the Golden Rule	November 2007	LM12345	Serials are surface-printed. Colors changed after LM09000 to improve visibility. Serial changed from black to white.
	Medal of Honor		123	
	National Guard		N1234	
	Navajo Nation	September 2003	B/A1234	
	Northern Arizona University	1989	V1234	Redesigned in 2010 and 2020. A 1999 centennial variation was also available.
	Pets Enrich Our Lives	May 2005	C1234; 1234C	
	Phoenix Suns	May 5, 2009	1PS2345	Serials are surface-printed. Redesigned in 2014. Updated Suns logo in 2021.
	Professional Fire Fighters		F/F1234	
	Purple Heart		1234	
	Special Olympics Arizona	December 19, 2016		$25 fee, of which $17 benefits local Special Olympics programs.
	A State of Good Character	September 2005	A12B34	
	Supporting Public Safety	2016	RF12345	
	Veteran		V/T1234	
	Veteran – Disabled Person		V/T123	Wheelchair embossed to left of serial.
	University of Arizona	1989	P1234; S1234	Redesigned in approx 2008 and 2012.
	University of Phoenix		F/A1234	
	White Mountain Apache	November 2007	WM123; 123WM	Serials are surface-printed.
