= Vehicle registration plates of the United States for 1984 =

1984 license plates in the United States

Vehicle registration plates of the United States by year
Vehicle registration plates of the United States for 1983	Events of 1984	Vehicle registration plates of the United States for 1985

Each of the 50 states of the United States of America plus several of its territories and the District of Columbia issued individual passenger license plates for 1984.

== Passenger baseplates ==
Passenger Car Plates
Image	Region	Design	Slogan	Serial format	Serials issued	Notes
	Alabama	Embossed red serial on reflective white plate; "Alabama" screened in dark blue centered at top.	"HEART OF DIXIE" in white within dark blue heart screened at top left			
	Alaska					
	American Samoa					
	Arizona					
	Arkansas					
	California					
	Colorado					
	Connecticut					
	Delaware					
	District of Columbia					
	Florida					
	Georgia					
	Guam					
	Hawaii					
	Idaho					
	Illinois					
	Indiana					
	Iowa					
	Kansas	Embossed blue serial on reflective white plate; gold sunflower and wheat stalk graphic screened at top left; "KANSAS" screened in blue centered at top		A/B C12345	Coded by county of issuance (A/B) and month of expiration (C)	
	Kentucky					
	Louisiana					
	Maine					
	Maryland					
	Massachusetts					
	Michigan					
	Minnesota					
	Mississippi					
	Missouri					
	Montana					
	Nebraska					
	Nevada					
	New Hampshire					
	New Jersey					
	New Mexico					
	New York					
	North Carolina					
	North Dakota					
	Northern Mariana; Islands					
	Ohio					
	Oklahoma					
	Oregon					
	Pennsylvania					
	Puerto Rico					
	Rhode Island					
	South Carolina					
	South Dakota					
	Tennessee					
	Texas					
	Utah					
	Vermont					
	Virginia	Embossed dark blue serial on reflective white plate with border line; "Virginia" screened in blue centered at top.	None	ABC-123		Still currently revalidated.
	Washington					
	West Virginia					
	Wisconsin					
	Wyoming					

== Non-passenger plates ==
Non-passenger Plates
Image (standard)	Region	Type	Design & Slogan	Serial format	Serials issued	Notes
	Alaska	Truck	Embossed dark blue serial on reflective golden yellow plate with border line; black "ALASKA" screened at top	AB 1234	1000 BA to approximately 9999 DS	Revalidated for 1984 with white on black stickers.
	California	Los Angeles Summer Olympic Games				
	Maine	Trailer	Embossed black serial on reflective white plate with border line; "MAINE 74" at top left, "TRAILER" at bottom	123-456	1 to approximately 125-000, 150-001 to 205-000	Revalidated for 1984 with white on red stickers.
	Maine	Trailer	Embossed black serial on reflective white plate with border line; "MAINE 74" at top, "TRAILER" at bottom	123-456	125-001 to approximately 150-000	Revalidated for 1984 with white on red stickers.
	Maine	Trailer	Embossed black serial on reflective white plate with border line; "MAINE" at top offset to left, "TRAILER" at bottom	123-456	205-001 to approximately 362-000	Revalidated for 1984 with white on red stickers.
	Maine	Trailer	Embossed black serial on reflective white plate with border line; "MAINE" at top, "TRAILER" at bottom	123-456	362-001 to approximately 599-999	Revalidated for 1984 with white on red stickers.
	Maine	Trailer	Embossed black serial on reflective white plate with border line; "MAINE" at top, "TRAILER" at bottom	A 12345	A 10000 to approximately C 40000	Revalidated for 1984 with white on red stickers.
	Oregon	Travel Trailer	White characters on light green background; No slogan	R123456	R400001 to approximately R499500	Revalidated for 1984 with white on red stickers.
	Wisconsin	Farm trailer	Embossed red serial on white plate with border line; "WISCONSIN" at bottom, "FARM TRAILER" at top; debossed "84" at bottom right	A/F1234	Coded by weight class (A)	Weight classes listed are A, B, C, D, E, F, G, H, J, K, L, and N.

== See also ==
- Antique vehicle registration
- Electronic license plate
- Motor vehicle registration
- Vehicle license
