= Vehicle registration plates of the United States for 1985 =

1985 license plates in the United States

Vehicle registration plates of the United States by year
| Vehicle registration plates of the United States for 1984 | Events of 1985 | Vehicle registration plates of the United States for 1986 |

Each of the 50 states of the United States of America plus several of its territories and the District of Columbia issued individual passenger license plates for 1985.

== Passenger baseplates ==
Passenger Car Plates
| Image | Region | Design | Slogan | Serial format | Serials issued | Notes |
|---|---|---|---|---|---|---|
| | Alabama | Embossed red serial on reflective white plate; "Alabama" screened in dark blue centered at top. | "HEART OF DIXIE" in white within dark blue heart screened at top left | | | |
| | Alaska | | | | | |
| | American Samoa | | | | | |
| | Arizona | | | | | |
| | Arkansas | | | | | |
| | California | | | | | |
| | Colorado | | | | | |
| | Connecticut | | | | | |
| | Delaware | | | | | |
| | District of Columbia | | | | | |
| | Florida | | | | | |
| | Georgia | | | | | |
| | Guam | | | | | |
| | Hawaii | | | | | |
| | Idaho | | | | | |
| | Illinois | | | | | |
| | Indiana | | | | | |
| | Iowa | Embossed reflective white serial on blue plate with border line; "IOWA" and county name centered at top and bottom respectively; "86" at top right | standard issues have the county name embossed at bottom | ABC 123 | LAA 000 to YZZ 999 | Non-resident plates discontinued. Month and year stickers are separate, and vanity plates had blank bottoms. |
| | Kansas | Embossed blue serial on reflective white plate; gold sunflower and wheat stalk graphic screened at top left; "KANSAS" screened in blue centered at top | | A/B C12345 | Coded by county of issuance (A/B) and month of expiration (C) | |
| | Kentucky | | | | | |
| | Louisiana | | | | | |
| | Maine | | | | | |
| | Maryland | | | | | |
| | Massachusetts | | | | | |
| | Michigan | | | | | |
| | Minnesota | | | | | |
| | Mississippi | | | | | |
| | Missouri | | | | | |
| | Montana | | | | | |
| | Nebraska | | | | | |
| | Nevada | | | | | |
| | New Hampshire | | | | | |
| | New Jersey | | | | | Validated by a windshield sticker. |
| | New Mexico | | | | | |
| | New York | | | | | |
| | North Carolina | | | | | |
| | North Dakota | | | | | |
| | Northern Mariana; Islands | | | | | |
| | Ohio | | | | | |
| | Oklahoma | | | | | |
| | Oregon | | | | | |
| | Pennsylvania | | | | | |
| | Puerto Rico | | | | | |
| | Rhode Island | | | | | |
| | South Carolina | | | | | |
| | South Dakota | | | | | |
| | Tennessee | | | | | |
| | Texas | | | | | |
| | Utah | | | | | |
| | Vermont | | | | | |
| | Virginia | Embossed dark blue serial on reflective white plate with border line; "Virginia" screened in blue centered at top. | None | ABC-123 | | Still currently revalidated. |
| | Washington | | | | | |
| | West Virginia | | | | | |
| | Wisconsin | Embossed black serial on reflective yellow plate; "WISCONSIN" at bottom, slogan at top; month of expiration at bottom left, debossed "80" at bottom right | AMERICA'S DAIRYLAND | A12-345; AB 1234 | Coded by month of expiration (A) | Revalidated for 1985 with yellow on light green stickers. |
| | Wyoming | | | | | |

== Non-passenger plates ==
Non-passenger Plates
| Image (standard) | Region | Type | Design & Slogan | Serial format | Serials issued | Notes |
|---|---|---|---|---|---|---|
| | Alaska | Truck | Embossed dark blue serial on reflective golden yellow plate with border line; black "ALASKA" screened at top | 1234 AB | 1000 BA to approximately 9999 DS | Revalidated for 1985 with black on red stickers. |
| | Maine | Trailer | Embossed black serial on reflective white plate with border line; "MAINE 74" at top left, "TRAILER" at bottom | 123-456 | 1 to approximately 125-000, 150-001 to 205-000 | Revalidated for 1985 with white on green stickers. |
| | Maine | Trailer | Embossed black serial on reflective white plate with border line; "MAINE 74" at top, "TRAILER" at bottom | 123-456 | 125-001 to approximately 150-000 | Revalidated for 1985 with white on green stickers. |
| | Maine | Trailer | Embossed black serial on reflective white plate with border line; "MAINE" at top offset to left, "TRAILER" at bottom | 123-456 | 205-001 to approximately 362-000 | Revalidated for 1985 with white on green stickers. |
| | Maine | Trailer | Embossed black serial on reflective white plate with border line; "MAINE" at top, "TRAILER" at bottom | 123-456 | 362-001 to approximately 599-999 | Revalidated for 1985 with white on green stickers. |
| | Maine | Trailer | Embossed black serial on reflective white plate with border line; "MAINE" at top, "TRAILER" at bottom | A 12345 | A 10000 to approximately C 40000 | Revalidated for 1985 with white on green stickers. |

== See also ==
- Antique vehicle registration
- Electronic license plate
- Motor vehicle registration
- Vehicle license
