= Vehicle registration plates of the United States for 1989 =

1989 license plates in the United States

Vehicle registration plates of the United States by year
| Vehicle registration plates of the United States for 1988 | Events of 1989 | Vehicle registration plates of the United States for 1990 |

All of the 50 constituent states of the United States and several of its territories and the District of Columbia issued individual passenger license plates for the year 1989.

== Passenger baseplates ==
Passenger car plates
| Image | Region | Design | Slogan | Serial format | Serials issued | Notes |
|---|---|---|---|---|---|---|
| | Alabama | Blue embossed digits on reflective white; red stylized "Alabama" at bottom center; two red hearts in upper corners, with two thin red lines at top of plate. | "HEART OF DIXIE" in plain wide red letters centered between red lines at top | 0AB 1234; 00AB 123 | Coded by county of issuance (0 or 00) | |
| | Alaska | Embossed blue numbers on reflective golden yellow plate; screened state flag in the center between letters and digits; "ALASKA" screened in blue serifed letters centered at top; indented top corners for revalidation stickers | "The Last Frontier" screened in blue serifed letters centered at bottom. | ABC 123 | BAA 100 to DJX 999 | |
| | American Samoa | Black letters on white background, image of palm tree at left. | "MOTU O FIAFIAGA" centered at top | 1234 | | |
| | Arizona | Embossed reflective white numbers on maroon plate with border line; embossed white saguaro cactus used as separator; "ARIZONA" centered at top. | "GRAND CANYON STATE" centered at bottom | ABC-123 | AAA-001 to approximately NXG-200 | Front and rear plates issued until around the ETT series (1989); rear plates only thereafter. Still currently revalidated. |
| | Arkansas | Embossed blue numbers on reflective white plate; red band screened at top containing "Arkansas" in white in the center | "The Natural State" screened in red centered at bottom | ABC 123 | POR 001 to approximately ZWO 999 | |
| | California | Blue numbers on reflective white background with embossed state name, "CALIFORNIA", in red | None | 1ABC123 | 2GQA000 to 3FMG999 | |
| | Colorado | Embossed white on reflective green; mountains at top | None | ABC-123 | County-coded | |
| | Connecticut | Embossed reflective (glass-beaded) white numbers on blue plate with border line, "CONNECTICUT" centered at bottom, and embossed state shape in top left corner | "CONSTITUTION STATE" at bottom | 123·ABC1 | 100·EVY to 999·NZM | Serials with L as the first letter were reserved for optional Preserve the Sound plates. |
| | Delaware | Screened gold numbers on reflective dark blue plate with gold border; "DELAWARE" centered at bottom | "THE FIRST STATE" centered at top | 123456 | 4 to 999999^{1-2} | Several variations of the font used for the serial exist. Some replacement plates have riveted numbers. |
| | District of Columbia | Embossed blue numbers on reflective white plate; screened district flag used as separator; screened red stripes above and below numbers; "Washington, D.C." screened in blue centered at bottom; debossed sticker boxes in bottom corners | "A Capital City" screened in blue centered at top | 123-456 | 925-001 to 999-999; 010-001 to 501-750 | Plates with all-numeric serials validated until April 2016. Slogan changed in 1991 in honor of the district's bicentennial. |
| | Florida | Embossed red numbers on reflective white plate; green state map screened to left of center behind numbers; "FLORIDA" centered at top | County name centered at bottom | ABC 12D | Exclusively from AAA 00A to approximately JUQ 99Z; intermittently from JUR 00A to approximately KGW 99Z | Early plates used a lighter shade of green for the state map, while some plates manufactured during 1988 featured a smaller-size state name. Letter O not used in serials (this practice continues today); 'M' series reserved for dealers and 'Y' and 'Z' series for rental vehicles. Replaced from 1992 through 1996 as part of five-year plate replacement cycle. |
| | Georgia | Embossed green on reflective white; screened "19 GEORGIA 83" at top | County name on sticker centered at bottom | ABC 123 | AAA 001 to approximately WCW 999 | Vanity plates featured the "Peach State" slogan in place of the county-name sticker. |
| | Guam | Green on reflective white with green map graphic in center with two latte stones | "HAFA ADAI" centered at top | ABC 123 | AAA 001 to approximately AFN 999 | |
| | Hawaii | Brown on reflective white; "HAWAII" centered at top; orange warrior head image screened in background; "81" screened in top right corner | "ALOHA STATE" centered at bottom | ABC 123 | County-coded (see right) | Honolulu County used A, B, C and D as the first letter; Hawaii County used H; Maui County used M; Kauai County used K. |
| | Idaho | Embossed green numbers on white plate; screened green lines above and below numbers; screened green Sawtooth Mountains graphic on top line at the right; "IDAHO" screened in green to left of graphic, with the 'A' resembling a mountain peak | "Famous Potatoes" centered at bottom | A 12345; 0/A 12345; 1/A A1234; 2/C 123456 | Coded by county of issuance (A or 0/A) | Top line cut off at the left, allowing for taller county-code characters. This plate replaced all 1974–87 plates; serials in each county thus restarted from 1. |
| | Illinois | Dark blue on reflective white with light and dark blue stripes; state name screened in dark blue at top left | "Land of Lincoln" at top right corner | 123 456; AB 1234 | Reissues of 1979–82 serials | |
| | Indiana | Blue serial on reflective blue, white and gold background | "Back Home Again" centered at top | 0A1234; 00A1234 | County-coded | Small white-on-blue county name sticker in bottom right corner. Plates were valid through October 31, 1990. |
| | Iowa | Embossed reflective white numbers on blue plate with border line; "IOWA" and county name centered at top and bottom respectively; "86" at top right | County name centered at bottom | ABC 123 | LAA 000 to YZZ 999 | Non-resident plates discontinued. |
| | Kansas | Embossed dark blue digits on white plate; brown stalk of wheat screened in the center; pale yellow band screened across top containing stylized "KANSAS" in the center and three dark blue stripes on either side | None | ABC 123 | AAA 000 to approximately DVD 999 | |
| | Kentucky | Embossed blue numbers on white plate; twin spires of Churchill Downs racetrack screened in blue at the top and a mare and foal screened in light blue in the center; "Kentucky" screened in blue serifed letters centered between spires; county name on blue sticker between state name and numbers | "Bluegrass State" centered at bottom | ABC 123 | TAA 000 to ZZZ 999; AAA 000 to approximately EBP 999 | Mare and foal based on the photograph The Soul of a Horse, taken by Peter Thomann. The base was withdrawn when Thomann threatened to sue for copyright infringement. |
| | Louisiana | Embossed dark blue numbers on reflective white plate, screened dark blue graphics of mother pelicans with chicks at top corners, "LoUiSiAna" screened in red and dark blue (the 'U', 'S', and 'A' in dark blue) centered at bottom | "SPORTSMAN'S PARADISE" screened in red centered at top | 123A456 | Letter corresponds to State Police troop area of issue | |
| | Maine | Embossed navy blue numbers on reflective white plate with border line; red American lobster screened behind numbers, offset to right; "MAINE" screened in wide red block letters centered at top | "Vacationland" centered at bottom | 12345 A | 1 P to 99999 Z | |
| | Maryland | Embossed black numbers on white plate; shield with the design of the Maryland state flag screened in the center; "Maryland" screened in black centered at top | None | ABC 123 | NAA 001 to ZZZ 999 | |
| | Massachusetts | Embossed green numbers on reflective white plate with border line; "MASSACHUSETTS" centered at top | None | 123·456 | 100·000 to 999·999 (see right) | Only rear plates issued (except for reserved and non-passenger plates). On all plates, the last digit corresponded to the month of expiration, with November and December expirations discontinued except on non-passenger plates and on red-and-white plates until 1980–81. All-numeric plates were generally issued to holders of the same serials on the red-on-white base. Still currently revalidated. |
| | Massachusetts | Red characters on reflective white plate; "MASSACHUSETTS" in blue centered at top | The Spirit of America | | | |
| | Michigan | Embossed reflective (glass-beaded) white numbers on blue plate; "MICHIGAN" centered at top | "GREAT LAKES" centered at bottom | 123 ABC | 000 AAA to 999 ZZZ | All variants of this base revalidated with stickers until 2007. Letters I and O not used in serials; this practice continues today. |
| | Minnesota | Embossed blue numbers on reflective graphic plate featuring a lake scene with pale blue and white water, pale blue sky, green island and trees, and a small green canoe; "Minnesota" screened in blue centered at top | "EXPLORE" screened in blue to left of state name, giving "Explore Minnesota"; "10,000 lakes" screened in blue centered at bottom | 123-ABC; state icon used as dash | 001-AAA to approximately 999-HZK | Replaced all 1977–87 plates. |
| | Mississippi | Embossed dark blue numbers on reflective white plate; "MISSISSIPPI" screened in red stylized serifed letters centered at top; county name embossed in dark blue block letters centered at bottom | County name centered at bottom | 1ABC123 | 1AAA001 to approximately 1FNJ999 | Narrow dies reintroduced. The initial '1' indicated the passenger class of vehicles. Letters I, O, Q and U and number 666 not used in serials. |
| | Missouri | Embossed reflective (glass-beaded) white numbers on maroon plate with border line; "MISSOURI" centered at top; month of expiration at top left | "SHOW-ME STATE" centered at bottom | AAB 123 | First letter corresponds to month of expiration | |
| | Montana | Embossed sky blue numbers on reflective white plate with screened red state-shaped border; red "76 Bicentennial" logo and sky blue buffalo skull screened at top left and bottom left corners respectively; red band screened above numbers containing "MONTANA" in white block letters; screened sky blue "'76" in bottom right corner | "BIG SKY" screened in sky blue block letters centered at bottom | 1·123456; 10·12345 | Coded by county of issuance (1 or 10) | A straight-line die was originally used for the number '1', before being replaced by a serifed version. |
| | Nebraska | Red on reflective white with yellow, orange and red sunset graphic at top | None | 1-A1234; 1-AB123; 10-A123; 10-AB12; 5/9-A1234 | Coded by county of issuance (1 or 10) | |
| | Nevada | Embossed blue numbers on white and silver graphic plate with a mountain scene featuring a Bighorn sheep; "NEVADA" screened in blue serifed letters centered at top | "THE SILVER STATE" screened in blue serifed letters centered at bottom | 123·ABC | 001·BAA to approximately 999·LDE | Awarded "Plate of the Year" for best new license plate of 1985 by the Automobile License Plate Collectors Association, the first and, to date, only time Nevada has been so honored. Co-recipient with North Dakota. |
| | New Hampshire | Embossed forest green numbers on reflective white plate; "NEW HAMPSHIRE" screened in dark green centered at top, with a graphic of the Old Man of the Mountain in a circle between the two words | "LIVE FREE OR DIE" screened in dark green sans serif text centered at bottom | ABC-123 | AAA-001 to approximately DEX-500 | |
| | New Jersey | Embossed buff lettering on medium blue plate, non-reflective, "NEW JERSEY" embossed in plain block letters centered at top | "GARDEN STATE" embossed in plain block letters centered at bottom | ABC-12D; New Jersey state icon used as dash | AAA-10A to HZZ-99Z2, 3, 5 | Between ETC and EXB the NJ map separator got changed, this happened again between GED and GML. |
| | New Mexico | Embossed red numbers on yellow plate; embossed Zia sun symbol used as separator; "New Mexico USA" screened in red centered below numbers; stamped indentation at top center for county-name sticker | "Land of Enchantment" centered at bottom | ABC-123 | KAK-001 to approximately LKL-999 | |
| | New York | Embossed dark blue numbers on reflective white plate, with red stripe at top and bottom; "NEW YORK" in plain serifed block font centered at top; red outlined Statue of Liberty screen printed in center (or at left on vanity plates) | None | | County-coded | Validated with windshield decal. |
| | North Carolina | Blue on reflective white with light blue Wright Flyer graphic | "First in Flight" screened at top | ABC-1234 | ANA-1001 to approximately WTF-1975 | A through M not used as second letters in serials (so AZZ was followed by BNA, BZZ was followed by CNA and so on); this practice continued until ZZZ-9999 was issued in 2010. OBX started to be issued in 1999 as a special series for Dare County, and continues to be issued as such today. |
| | North Dakota | Embossed black numbers on light blue, white and light orange gradient plate; long black bar screened below numbers with "NORTH DAKOTA" in white serifed letters in the center, "1889" to the left and "1989" to the right | Short black bar screened above numbers with "CENTENNIAL" in white serifed letters in the center; "PEACE GARDEN STATE" screened in black block letters centered above short black bar | ABC 123 | BAA 000 to approximately CNP 999 | |
| | Northern Mariana Islands | | | | | |
| | Ohio | Green on reflective white; state shape used as separator | County name centered at bottom | 123•ABC | 001•AAA to approximately 999•YOZ | |
| | Oklahoma | Embossed green numbers on reflective white plate; battle shield of the Osage Nation screened in the center; "OKLAHOMA" screened in black cursive letters centered at top | "OK!" screened in tan cursive letters centered between state name and battle shield | ABC 123 | County-coded | Awarded "Plate of the Year" for best new license plate of 1989 by the Automobile License Plate Collectors Association, the first time Oklahoma was so honored. Co-recipient with Nova Scotia. Serials in each county continued from where the 1983–88 plates left off, with leading zeros added in numbers below 100. Revalidated with stickers until 2009. |
| | Oregon | Embossed dark blue numbers on mountain skyline with pale lavender mountains, light khaki sky and pale green Douglas Fir in the center; "Oregon" screened in pale blue serifed letters centered at top | None | ABC 123 | PDN 001 to QNL 999 | Was introduced the previous year, and was awarded "Plate of the Year" for best new license plate of that year by the Automobile License Plate Collectors Association, the first time Oregon was so honored. |
| | Pennsylvania | Reflective yellow on blue with large keystone separator | "KEYSTONE STATE" centered at top | ABC-123 | HAA-000 to RZZ-999 ^{1} | Sticker validation through 2002. Letter U not used in the ABC-1234 serial format (in addition to I, O and Q). |
| | Puerto Rico | Black characters on reflective white base | "Isla Del Encanto" | ABC 123 | | |
| | Rhode Island | Embossed blue numbers on reflective white plate with border line; "RHODE ISLAND" embossed in blue block letters centered at bottom; blue anchor embossed in top left corner | "⚓ OCEAN STATE" at top | AB-123 | AA-100 to ZZ-999 (see right) | On all variants of this base, serials were issued and reissued in random order, as existing registrants generally retained the serials from their previous plates (including 1967–79 plates) when receiving new ones. During 1992, plates were manufactured in Massachusetts, using that state's dies. |
| | South Carolina | Embossed blue numbers on reflective white plate; pale blue Sabal palmetto screened in the center; "SOUTH CAROLINA" screened in red at top | None | ABC 123 | AAA 501 to ZZZ 999 | Numbers 501 to 900 issued for each three-letter series, with 901 to 999 added in 1988. |
| | South Dakota | Embossed red on white with screened blue Mount Rushmore graphic in bottom right corner | "1889–1989" centered at bottom | 1AB 123; 10A 123 | Coded by county of issuance (1 or 10) | Numeric county codes reintroduced. Letters I, O and Q not used in serials; this practice continues today. |
| | Tennessee | Embossed red numbers on reflective white plate; blue circle with three white stars (from the Tennessean state flag) screened in the center; "Tennessee" screened in blue centered at top; county name on blue sticker centered at bottom | County name centered at bottom | ABC 123 | ABB 001 to ZZZ 999 (see right) | Serials began at DBB 001 and ran to ZZZ 999, followed by BBB 001 through CZZ 999; vowels and Y were not used until 1993, when Y and then A were used as the first letter (the last serial issued was in the APP series). |
| | Texas | Dark blue on reflective white, screened red state-shaped separator | None | 123-ABC | 975-PAY to 999-ZZZ | |
| | Utah | Blue on white with skier graphic | "GREATEST SNOW ON EARTH" centered at bottom | 001 AAA to 999 DWW | | Awarded "Plate of the Year" for best new license plate of 1986 by the Automobile License Plate Collectors Association, the first and, to date, only time Utah has been so honored. Letters G, U, X, Y and Z added to serials in late 1992, beginning with the FPG series. |
| | Vermont | Debossed white numbers on green plate; screened white rectangular box around numbers; "Vermont" screened in white centered at top; white sugar maple screened at top left | "Green Mountain State" centered at bottom | | | |
| | Virginia | Embossed dark blue numbers on reflective white plate with border line; "Virginia" screened in blue centered at top | None | ABC-123 | AAA-101 to ZZZ-999 (see right) | Still currently revalidated. Serials UAA-101 through ZZZ-999 issued first, followed by AAA-101 through SZZ-999 as 1973–79 plates were invalidated, then (from 1988) all serials with I, O, Q and T as the first letter, and finally (from 1990) all remaining serials with I, O or Q as the second and/or third letters (beginning with AAI-101 and ending with ZZQ-999). |
| | Washington | Embossed dark blue numbers on reflective white plate with light blue Mount Rainier graphic and dark blue border line; "Washington" screened in red centered at top | "Centennial Celebration" screened in red centered at bottom | 123-ABC | 000-AAA to 999-DGP | |
| | West Virginia | Embossed dark blue numbers on reflective white plate; yellow state shape screened at left behind numbers; "WEST VIRGINIA" screened in dark blue centered at bottom | "Wild, Wonderful" centered at top | 0A-1234; 0AB-123; AA-1234; AAB-123 | First character corresponds to month of expiration | Two-letter series introduced for each month as single-letter series were exhausted. These series progressed as follows: both letters A through M only, then first letter N through Z and second letter A through M, then first letter A through M and second letter N through Z. |
| | Wisconsin | Embossed dark red numbers on reflective white plate; "WISCONSIN" screened in dark blue at top left and graphics screened at top right featuring a sailboat and sunset, flying geese, and a farm scene; green and dark blue lines separating state name and graphics from numbers | "America's Dairyland" centered at bottom | ABC-123 | BAA-101 to NMD-999 | Numbers changed from dark blue to red in response to concerns of confusion with Illinois' license plates of the time. |
| | Wyoming | Embossed red numbers and Bucking Horse and Rider on graphic plate featuring white cloud-covered mountains against a blue sky; "Wyoming" screened in dark blue serifed letters at top, offset to right. | "1890 Centennial 1990" screened in dark blue serifed letters at bottom | 1-1234; 1-123A/B; 1/0-1234; 1/0-123A/B | Coded by county of issuance (1 or 1/0) | |

== Non-passenger plates ==
Non-passenger plates
| Image | Region | Type | Design and slogan | Serial format | Serials issued | Notes |
|---|---|---|---|---|---|---|
| | Indiana | Temporary | Red on white, with relevant vehicular information hand-written in black ink. | | | 21-day period |
| | Maryland | Temporary | Black serials on white background. | | | |
| | New York | Motorcycle | | | | |
| | Virginia | Temporary | Red on white, with relevant vehicular information hand-written in black ink. | | | 30-day period |

== See also ==
- Antique vehicle registration
- Electronic license plate
- Motor vehicle registration
- Vehicle license
