= Vehicle registration plates of the United States for 1988 =

1988 license plates in the United States

Vehicle registration plates of the United States by year
Vehicle registration plates of the United States for 1987	Events of 1988	Vehicle registration plates of the United States for 1989

Each of the 50 states of the United States of America plus several of its territories and the District of Columbia issued individual passenger license plates for 1988.

== Passenger baseplates ==
Passenger car plates
Image	Region	Design	Slogan	Serial format	Serials issued	Notes
	Alabama					
	Alaska					
	American Samoa					
	Arizona					
	Arkansas					
	California					
	Colorado					
	Connecticut					
	Delaware					
	District of Columbia					
	Florida					
	Georgia					
	Guam					
	Hawaii					
	Idaho	Embossed green numbers on white plate; screened green lines above and below numbers; screened green Sawtooth Mountains graphic on top line at the right; "IDAHO" screened in green to left of graphic, with the 'A' resembling a mountain peak	"Famous Potatoes" centered at bottom	A 12345; 0/A 12345; 1/A A1234; 2/C 123456	Coded by county of issuance (A or 0/A)	Top line cut off at the left, allowing for taller county-code characters. This plate replaced all 1974–87 plates; serials in each county thus restarted from 1.
	Illinois					
	Indiana					
	Iowa					
	Kansas	This design used since 1982 was issued until 1988 when it was replaced by the new wheat base. Some registrations for 1988 were backdated onto the new base instead of the old one.		A/B C12345	Coded by county of issuance (A/B) and month of expiration (C)	
	Kansas	This new base contained an embossed dark blue serial on a white plate; brown stalk of wheat screened in the center; pale yellow band screened across top containing stylized "KANSAS" in the center and three dark blue stripes on either side		ABC 123	AAA 000 to approximately DVD 999	
	Kentucky					
	Louisiana					
	Maine					
	Maryland					
	Massachusetts					
	Michigan					
	Minnesota					
	Mississippi					
	Missouri					
	Montana					
	Nebraska					
	Nevada					
	New Hampshire					
	New Jersey					
	New Mexico					
	New York					
	North Carolina					
	North Dakota					
	Northern Mariana; Islands					
	Ohio					
	Oklahoma					
	Oregon					
	Pennsylvania					
	Puerto Rico					
	Rhode Island					
	South Carolina					
	South Dakota					
	Tennessee					
	Texas					
	Utah					
	Vermont					
	Virginia	Embossed dark blue serial on reflective white plate with border line; "Virginia" screened in blue centered at top.	None	ABC-123		Still currently revalidated.
	Washington	Embossed dark blue serial on reflective white plate with light blue Mount Rainier graphic and dark blue border line; "Washington" screened in red centered at top.	"Centennial Celebration" screened in red centered at bottom	123-ABC		
	West Virginia					
	Wisconsin					
	Wyoming					

== Non-passenger plates ==
Non-passenger plates
Image (standard)	Region	Type	Design and slogan	Serial format	Serials issued	Notes

== See also ==
- Antique vehicle registration
- Electronic license plate
- Motor vehicle registration
- Vehicle license
