= Vehicle registration plates of the United States for 1987 =

1987 license plates in the United States

Vehicle registration plates of the United States by year
Vehicle registration plates of the United States for 1986	Events of 1987	Vehicle registration plates of the United States for 1988

Each of the 50 states of the United States of America plus several of its territories and the District of Columbia issued individual passenger license plates for 1987.

== Passenger baseplates ==
Passenger Car Plates
Image	Region	Design	Slogan	Serial format	Serials issued	Notes
	Alabama					
	Alaska					
	American Samoa					
	Arizona					
	Arkansas					
	California	embossed gold serial on blue plate, "CALIFORNIA" embossed on top	none	1ABC123		
	California	embossed navy blue serial on reflective white plate with 2 gold lines and a gold circle that's white if a gold line was there, "CALIFORNIA" screened in red in an art-deco font on top	official nickname	2ABC123		used for the California Games logo
	California	embossed navy blue serial on white plate, "CALIFORNIA" embossed in red on top	none	1ABC123		
	Colorado					
	Connecticut					
	Delaware					
	District of Columbia					
	Florida					
	Georgia					
	Guam					
	Hawaii					
	Idaho					
	Illinois					
	Indiana					
	Iowa					
	Kansas	Embossed blue serial on reflective white plate; gold sunflower and wheat stalk graphic screened at top left; "KANSAS" screened in blue centered at top		A/B C12345	Coded by county of issuance (A/B) and month of expiration (C)	
	Kentucky					
	Louisiana					
	Maine					
	Maryland					
	Massachusetts					
	Michigan					
	Minnesota					
	Mississippi					
	Missouri					
	Montana					
	Nebraska					
	Nevada					
	New Hampshire					
	New Jersey					
	New Mexico					
	New York					
	North Carolina					
	North Dakota					
	Northern Mariana; Islands					
	Ohio					
	Oklahoma					
	Oregon					
	Pennsylvania					
	Puerto Rico					
	Rhode Island					
	South Carolina					
	South Dakota					
	Tennessee					
	Texas					
	Utah					
	Vermont					
	Virginia	Embossed dark blue serial on reflective white plate with border line; "Virginia" screened in blue centered at top.	None	ABC-123		Still currently revalidated.
	Washington					
	West Virginia					
	Wisconsin					
	Wyoming					

== Non-passenger plates ==
Non-passenger Plates
Image (standard)	Region	Type	Design & Slogan	Serial format	Serials issued	Notes
	Texas	Truck	Embossed dark blue serial on reflective white plate; red "TEXAS" screened above embossed "TRUCK" at top, red "SESQUICENTENNIAL" screened at bottom; state shape "1836" above and "1986" below screened in red at center	123 4AB	000 1CR to 299 9KK	Revalidated for 1987 with white on green stickers.
	Wisconsin	Private semi-trailer	Embossed white serial on green plate with border line; "WISCONSIN" at bottom, "SEMI TRAILER" at top; "DEC" at top right, debossed "82" at bottom right	P/E12345	P/E 1 to approximately P/E22000	Five year semi-trailer license plates issued in 1982; revalidated for 1987 with blue on silver stickers.

== See also ==
- Antique vehicle registration
- Electronic license plate
- Motor vehicle registration
- Vehicle license
