= Vehicle registration plates of Utah =

Utah vehicle license plates

Utah
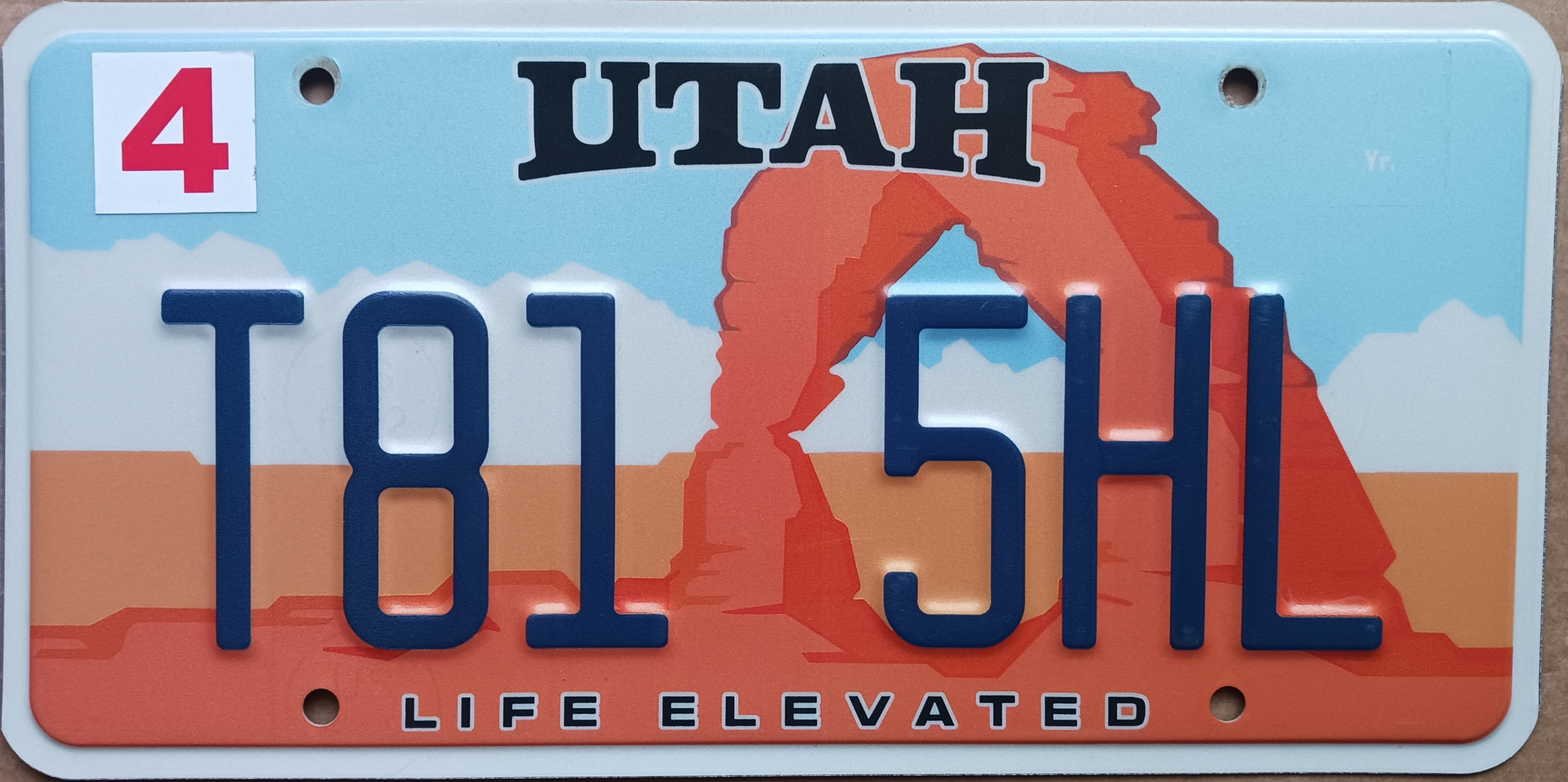
- Current arch license plate

Current series
- Slogan: Ski and arch plates: Life Elevated; Ski plate only: Greatest Snow on Earth; In God We Trust plate: In God We Trust; United We Stand
- Size: 12 in × 6 in 30 cm × 15 cm
- Material: Aluminum
- Serial format: Ski and arch plates: A12 3BC; In God We Trust plate: 1ABC2
- Introduced: Ski and arch plates: November 19, 2007; In God We Trust plate: 2013; standardized from January 1, 2017 onwards

Availability
- Issued by: Utah State Tax Commission, Division of Motor Vehicles

History
- First issued: May 11, 1915 (pre-state plates from May 11, 1909 through May 10, 1915)

The U.S. state of Utah first required its residents to register their motor vehicles in 1909. Registrants provided their own license plates for display until 1915, when the state began to issue plates.

As of 2026, plates are issued by the Utah State Tax Commission through its Division of Motor Vehicles. Only rear plates are required for most classes of vehicles, including motorcycles and trailers. The front plate requirement was lifted for passenger vehicles on January 1, 2025. Month and year decals have now been consolidated into one sticker instead of two separate decals. New license plates will now be flat-screen printed instead of being embossed.

== Passenger baseplates ==
=== 1915 to 1967 ===
In 1956, the United States, Canada, and Mexico came to an agreement with the American Association of Motor Vehicle Administrators, the Automobile Manufacturers Association and the National Safety Council that standardized the size for license plates for vehicles (except those for motorcycles) at 6 inches (15 cm) in height by 12 inches (30 cm) in width, with standardized mounting holes. The 1954 (dated 1955) issue was the first Utah license plate that complied with these standards.

Image	Dates issued	Design	Slogan	Serial format	Serials issued	Notes
	1915	Dark green on white; "U 15" at right	none	1234	1 to approximately 7600	
	1916	Yellow on brown; "U 16" at right	none	12345	1 to approximately 13800	
	1917	Black on gray; "U 17" at right	none	12345	1 to approximately 18200	
	1918	Gray on black; "U 18" at right	none	12345	1 to approximately 22000	
	1919	White on dark olive green; "U 19" at right	none	12345	5000 to approximately 34600	Serials 1 through 399 used on dealer plates, and 400 through 4999 on truck plates.
	1920	White on blue; "U 20" at right	none	12345	5000 to approximately 42300	Dealer and truck plate serials same as 1919.
	1921	Orange on black; lines at top and bottom borders; "U 21" at right	none	12345	7001 to approximately 47500	Serials 1 through 400 used on dealer plates, and 401 through 7000 on truck plates.
	1922	White on black with border line; "U 22" at right	none	12-345	8-501 to approximately 49-500	Serial 1 issued to Secretary of State; 2 through 300 used on dealer plates, 301 through 8-000 on truck plates, and 8-001 through 8-500 on trailer plates.
	1923	White on red with border line; slanted "UTAH" and "1923" at left	none	12-345	8-501 to approximately 65-000	First use of the full state name. Secretary of State, dealer, truck and trailer plate serials same as 1922.
	1924	White on dark blue with border line; slanted "UTAH" and "1924" at right	none	12-345	10-000 to approximately 79-000	Serial 1 issued to Secretary of State; 2 through 299 used on dealer plates, 300 through 499 on trailer plates, 500 through 999 on exempt plates, and 1-000 through 9-999 on truck plates.
	1925	White on green with border line; "UTAH 25" at left	none	12-345	13-000 to approximately 91-000	Serial 1 issued to Secretary of State; 2 through 299 used on dealer plates, 300 through 399 on trailer plates, 400 through 999 on exempt plates, and 1-000 through 12-999 on truck plates.
	1926	Black on silver with border line; "26 UTAH" at right	none	12-345	14-000 to approximately 95-000	Serial 1 issued to Secretary of State; 2 through 299 used on dealer plates, 300 through 499 on trailer plates, 500 through 12-999 on truck plates, and 13-000 through 13-999 on exempt plates.
	1927	White on dark blue with border line; "UTAH 27" at left	none	12-345	1-500 to approximately 82-000	
	1928	Black on yellow with border line; "UTAH 28" at right	none	12-345	1-500 to approximately 91-000	
	1929	Black on green with border line; "UTAH 29" at left	none	12-345	1-500 to approximately 96-500	
	1930	White on black with border line; "UTAH 30" at right	none	12-345	1-500 to approximately 93-500	
	1931	Black on silver with border line; "31 UTAH" at right	none	12-345	1-500 to approximately 91-500	
	1932	White on black with border line; "32 UTAH" at left	none	12-345	1-500 to approximately 95-500	
	1933	White on black with border line; "UTAH - 1933" at top	none	12-345	1-500 to approximately 78-500	
	1934	Black on silver with border line; "UTAH - 1934" at bottom	none	123-456	30-000 to approximately 133-000	
	1935	White on black with border line; "1935 - UTAH" at bottom	none	123-456	50-001 to approximately 154-000	
	1936	Black on silver with border line; "UTAH - 1936" at bottom	none	123-456	50-001 to approximately 167-500	
	1937	White on black with border line; "UTAH - 1937" at top	none	123-456	50-001 to approximately 179-000	
	1938	Maroon on white with border line; "UTAH - 1938" at bottom	none	123-456	50-001 to approximately 174-000	
	1939	White on blue/black with border line; "UTAH - 1939" at top	none	123-456	100-001 to approximately 229-500	
	1940	Orange on dark blue with border line; "UTAH - 40" at bottom	none	A-1234		
	1941	White on black with border line; "UTAH - 41" at top right	none	A 1234		
	1942–43	Black on white with border line; "42 UTAH" at left	CENTER SCENIC AMERICA	A 1234		Revalidated for 1943 with windshield stickers, due to metal conservation for World War II.
	1944	Black on white; "UTAH 44" at bottom	none	A1234		Manufactured on soybean-based fiberboard due to ongoing metal conservation.
	1945	White on maroon with border line; "45 UTAH" at left	CENTER SCENIC AMERICA	A1234		
	1946	White on black with border line; "46 UTAH" at left	CENTER SCENIC AMERICA	A1234		
	1947	Yellow on black with border line; "47 UTAH" at left	THIS IS THE PLACE	A1234		
	1948	White on black with border line; vertical "UTAH" and "48" at left	THE FRIENDLY STATE	A1234		
	1949	White on black with border line; "UTAH - 49" at bottom right	none	A 1234		
	1950	Orange on black with border line; "UTAH - 50" at top right	none	A 1234		
	1951	White on green with border line; "UTAH 1951" at top right	none	A/B 123		
	1952	White on blue with border line; "UTAH 1952" at bottom left	none	123 A/B		
	1953	Yellow on black with border line; "UTAH 1953" at top right	none	A/B 123		
	1954	White on dark green with border line; "UTAH 1954" at bottom right	none	A/B 123		
	1955	White on black with border line; "UTAH 1955" at top	none	AB 123		
	1956	White on dark red with border line; "UTAH 56" at bottom right	none	A/B 1234	A/A 1000 to approximately D/J 9999	For each two-letter series, only the letters A, B, C, D, E, F, H, J and K were used. This practice continued until 1970.
	1957	White on dark blue with border line; "UTAH 57" at top right	none	A/B 1234	A/A 1000 to approximately D/J 5000	
	1958	Yellow on dark blue with border line; "UTAH 58" at top right	none	A/B 1234	A/A 1000 to approximately D/H 9999	
	1959	White on red-orange; "UTAH 59" at top	none	AB 1234	AA 1000 to approximately DK 5000	
	1960	Dark red on off gray; "UTAH 60" at top	none	AB 1234	AA 1000 to approximately DK 9999	
	1961	Dark blue on off white; "UTAH 61" at top	none	AB 1234	AA 1000 to approximately EC 5000	
	1962	Red on off gray/white; "UTAH 62" at top	none	AB 1234	AA 1000 to approximately EE 5000	
	1963	White on dark blue; "UTAH 63" at bottom	none	AB 1234	AA 1000 to approximately EH 5000	
	1964	White on green; "UTAH 64" at top	none	AB 1234	AA 1000 to approximately EJ 9999	
	1965	White on blue; "UTAH 65" at bottom	none	AB 1234	AA 1000 to approximately FA 9999	
	1966	White on black; "UTAH 66" at top	none	AB 1234	AA 1000 to approximately FB 9999	
	1967	White on green; "UTAH 67" at bottom	none	AB 1234	AA 1000 to approximately FD 5000	

=== 1968 to present ===
Image	Dates issued	Design	Slogan	Serial format	Serials issued	Notes
	1968–72	White on black; "UTAH" centered at bottom	none	AB 1234	AA 1000 to KK 9999; LL 1000 to approximately PR 9999	Revalidated for 1969, 1970, 1971 and 1972 with stickers. After KK 9999 was issued in 1970, the serial format continued with only the letters L, M, N, P, R, S, T, V and W used.
	1973	Black on reflective white; "UTAH 73" at bottom	none	ABC 123	AAA 001 to approximately HDH 999	Three-letter series used a split-alphabet system, with each letter advancing A, B, C, D, E, F, H, J, K (block 1), or L, M, N, P, R, S, T, V, W (block 2). Progression was as follows: all three letters in block 1, then first letter in block 2 and last two letters in block 1, then first two letters in block 2 and last letter in block 1, then all three letters in block 2, and finally first two letters in block 1 and last letter in block 2. On the 1974–78 variant, two different designs of beehive were used - one rounded, the other pointed. All variants are still currently revalidated.
	1973	As above, but without year ("UTAH" offset to left)	none	ABC 123	HDJ 001 to approximately HJB 999	
	1973–74	As above, but with "UTAH" centered	none	ABC 123	HJC 001 to approximately KEE 999	
	1974–78	As above, but with embossed beehive used as separator in serial	none	ABC 123	KEF 001 to KKK 999; LAA 001 to WKK 999; LLA 001 to approximately LWK 999	
	1978–81	As above, but without beehive (similar to 1973–74)	none	ABC 123	MLA 001 to WWK 999; LLL 001 to approximately MVW 999	
	1982–85	As above, but with "UTAH" screened rather than embossed	none	ABC 123	MWL 001 to WWW 999; AAL 001 to approximately BFP 999	
	1985–90	Blue on white with skier graphic	Greatest Snow on Earth	123 ABC	001 AAA to 999 DWW	Awarded "Plate of the Year" for best new license plate of 1986 by the Automobile License Plate Collectors Association, the first and, to date, only time Utah has been so honored. Letters G, U, X, Y and Z added to serials in late 1992, beginning with the FPG series. Certain plates in the 001 LAA - 999 LZZ series have been spotted with the 'W' dies incorrectly stamped.
	1990–93	As above, but with narrower serial dies	Greatest Snow on Earth	123 ABC	001 EAA to approximately 999 GPY	Awarded "Plate of the Year" for best new license plate of 1986 by the Automobile License Plate Collectors Association, the first and, to date, only time Utah has been so honored. Letters G, U, X, Y and Z added to serials in late 1992, beginning with the FPG series. Certain plates in the 001 LAA - 999 LZZ series have been spotted with the 'W' dies incorrectly stamped.
	1993 – November 18, 2007	As above, but with darker blue serials	Greatest Snow on Earth	123 ABC	001 GPZ to approximately 999 PMV	Awarded "Plate of the Year" for best new license plate of 1986 by the Automobile License Plate Collectors Association, the first and, to date, only time Utah has been so honored. Letters G, U, X, Y and Z added to serials in late 1992, beginning with the FPG series. Certain plates in the 001 LAA - 999 LZZ series have been spotted with the 'W' dies incorrectly stamped.
	1992–96	Dark blue on Delicate Arch graphic; "UTAH" in white	Centennial	123 ABC	001 ZAA to 999 ZEZ	Commemorated Utah's 100 years of statehood. Issued concurrently with the 1985 Ski base, first as an extra-fee base and then as a no-cost base from 1997. The first letter in the serial progressed backwards (so 999 ZZZ was followed by 001 YAA, 999 YZZ was followed by 001 XAA, and so on). Certain plates in the 001 XAA - 999 XZZ series have been spotted with the 'W' dies incorrectly stamped.
	1996 – November 18, 2007	As above, but with "UTAH" in blue	Centennial	123 ABC	001 ZFA to approximately 999 UYL (see right)	Commemorated Utah's 100 years of statehood. Issued concurrently with the 1985 Ski base, first as an extra-fee base and then as a no-cost base from 1997. The first letter in the serial progressed backwards (so 999 ZZZ was followed by 001 YAA, 999 YZZ was followed by 001 XAA, and so on). Certain plates in the 001 XAA - 999 XZZ series have been spotted with the 'W' dies incorrectly stamped.
	November 19, 2007 – May 2023	Dark blue on skier graphic	Greatest Snow on Earth / Life Elevated	A12 3BC	A00 1AA to G99 9XZ (see right)	Redesigned Ski base and updated Arch base, issued concurrently. On the Arch base, the first letter in the serial progresses backwards (Z then Y then X etc.). For both types, then the letters in the 5th and 6th positions are issued alphabetically (AA to ZZ). Then the next first letter is started. The letters I, O and Q are not used. For Life Elevated - Skier plates, all plates issued during the B-NW - D-FW, D-WZ, and F-GW series have the 'W' die incorrectly stamped. Certain plates in the B-BW series have been spotted using the 'W' die stamped correctly and incorrectly. For Life Elevated - Arches plates, all plates issued during the Z-YW - X-CW, X-UW, X-WD, and V-BW series have the 'W' die incorrectly stamped, except for the Y-SW and Y-TW series. The Y-SM, Y-TM, X-DM, and X-MJ series have the 'M' die incorrectly stamped. Certain plates in the X-SW series have been spotted with the 'W' die stamped correctly and incorrectly. With the updated North Carolina dies introduced in 2023, Ski and Arch plates have been seen reverting back to the old dies in random sequences throughout the G-Yx series and T-Hx series. Approximately G00 1YW-G34 9YW, G00 1YX-G99 9YZ, and T00 1HZ-T84 9HZ were seen using the previous dies. For 2025, Utah no longer embosses the characters into the plate. All new plates are now flat screen printed. Utah is re-using stagnant plate numbers that were originally issued from 2007-2023 on both the 2007 skier and arch base. Skier plates are issued in ascending order, re-starting again with the A series. Arch plates are issued in ascending order but with the first letter progressing backwards, re-starting again with the Z series. This is the first time the state has re-issued a previous serial run to our knowledge. The previous series on both the skier and arch bases, resuming from where the embossed plates left off starting with the H-JJ and S-BN series respectively, appear to continue being issued for fleet/rental vehicles only.
	May 2023 – December 2024	As above, but with thinner, squarer serial dies (using North Carolina dies)	Greatest Snow on Earth / Life Elevated	A12 3BC	G00 1YA to H99 9JH	
	January 2025 – Present	As above, but with flat print	Greatest Snow on Earth / Life Elevated	A12 3BC	H00 1JJ to H29 5JW and A00 1AA to A05 4ML (as of November 18, 2026)	
	November 19, 2007 – March 2023	Dark blue on Delicate Arch graphic	Life Elevated	A12 3BC	Z00 1AA to T99 9GZ (see right)	
	March 2023 – December 2024	As above, but with thinner, squarer characters (using North Carolina dies)	Life Elevated	A12 3BC	T00 1HA to S99 9BM	
	January 2025 – present	As above, but with flat print	Life Elevated	A12 3BC	S00 1BN to S03 0DH and Z00 1AA to Y15 2AL (as of November 21, 2026)	
	January 1, 2017 – April; 2018	Dark blue on white with national flag at left	In God We Trust / United We Stand	A123B	Z001A to N999Z	First issued in 2013 as a specialty plate; standardized from 2017 onwards. In the A123B serial format, the first letter progressed backwards (so Z999Z was followed by Y001A, Y999Z was followed by X001A, and so on). In the 1A2BC and 1ABC2 formats, letter combinations begin with the numbers 00 instead of 01 (so 9AAA9 is followed by 0AAB0, 9AAB9 is followed by 0AAC0 and so on). The #A#FM, #A#GM, and #M#MB series have the 'M' die incorrectly stamped. Certain plates in the #U#ZW series have been spotted with the 'W' die stamped correctly and incorrectly. For 2025, Utah no longer embosses the characters into the plate. All new plates are now flat screen printed. In God We Trust plates are still issued using the 1ABC2 format that began in August 2023 while also re-using plates from the A123B format, which is the serial format that specialty plates used from 2007-2019. What determines which alphanumeric series gets printed onto an In God We Trust plate is unknown. The current 1ABC2 format transitioned from embossed to flat plates sometime during the FEx-FFx series. The re-using of the A123B format for In God We Trust appears to have begun around A001N and is ascending up the alphabet similar to what specialty plates did from 2007-2019. This is the first time the state has re-issued a previous serial run to our knowledge.
	April 2018 – June; 2023	Dark blue on white with national flag at left	In God We Trust / United We Stand	1A2BC	0A0AA to approximately 4Z9GL (see right)	
	June; 2023 – August 2023	As above, but with thinner, squarer characters (using North Carolina dies)	In God We Trust / United We Stand	1A2BC	Approximately 5Z0GL to 9Z9ZZ	
	August 2023 – December 2024	As above, but with thinner, squarer characters (using North Carolina dies)	In God We Trust / United We Stand	1ABC2	0AAA0 to 9FEZ9	
	January 2025 – present	As above, but with flat print	In God We Trust / United We Stand	A123B and 1ABC2	A001P to D094U and 0FFA0 to 0LYL2 (as of October 31, 2026)	
	June 1, 2026 - July 31, 2027	White on dark blue featuring the 13-star colonial flag on the left, with 1776 in the middle of the stars.	America 250	1A2345	0A0001 to 4B2994 (as of November 12, 2026)	The America 250 plate is a limited edition plate that Utah and many other US states are issuing in celebrating the 250th anniversary of the Declaration of Independence signing on July 4, 2026. This is a standard issue plate celebrating a major event - similar to the 2002 Utah Winter Olympic Games plate.

== Non-passenger plates ==
=== Current ===
Image	Type	First issued	Design	Slogan	Serial format	Serials issued	Notes
	Disabled Person	1990s – July 2023	Plain white base; International Symbol of Access at left	Greatest Snow on Earth	1234A	0001A to approximately 4285U	Drivers who need a disabled person plate have 3 different options for a plate design. They are able to choose from a plain white base, a skier base, or an arches base. Serial formats 1234A, A123B, & 12AB3 are shared with the optional plates, as all optional plates share the same plain white base. The B###W - D###W series have been spotted with the 'W' die stamped incorrectly. For 2025, Utah no longer embosses the characters onto the plate. All plates are now flat screen printed. In addition to the current 12AB3 format, it appears that Utah is re-using retired plate numbers from the A123B and 1234A formats from when they were originally issued from 2007-2023. The A123B format is also being shared with flat printed In God We Trust plates. Specialty plates are issued in ascending order starting again the A series. This is the first time the state has re-issued a previous serial run to our knowledge.
	Disabled Person	1990s – July 2023	Plain white base; International Symbol of Access at left	Greatest Snow on Earth	A123B	A001A to M999Z	
	Disabled Person	1990s – July 2023	Plain white base; International Symbol of Access at left	Greatest Snow on Earth	12AB3	00AA1 to 99FB9	
	Disabled Person	July 2023 — December 2024	As above, but with thinner, squarer characters (using North Carolina dies)	Greatest Snow on Earth	12AB3	00FD1 to 99GV9	
	Disabled Person	January 2025—present	As above, but with flat print		A123B, 12AB3, and 1234A	A001A to A999N, 00GW1 to 31GY3, and 0001A to 0461G (as of October 29, 2026)	
	Disabled Person	1990s — 2007	As Centennial base; International Symbol of Access at left	Centennial	1234A	0000Z to no later than 9999V	
	Disabled Person	2007 - 2023	Dark blue on skier graphic; International Symbol of Access at left	Life Elevated	AB12C	AA01A to AL99Z	Redesigned Ski base and updated Arch base, issued concurrently. On the Arch base, the first letter in the serial progresses backwards (Z then Y then X etc.). For both types, then the letters in the 2nd and 5th positions are issued alphabetically (AA to ZZ). Then the next first letter is started. Important to note, the AB12C serial format is exclusive to the Skier and Arch disabled person plates. For the Disabled Person Life Elevated - Arches plates, the ZA-W series has been spotted with the 'W' die incorrectly stamped. Certain plates in the ZM01A - ZM99Z series have been spotted with the 'M' die stamped correctly and incorrectly.
	Disabled Person	January 2025 - Present	As above, but with thinner, squarer characters (using North Carolina dies) and issued with flat print.	Life Elevated	AB12C	AA01A to AN72S (as of September 19, 2026)	
	Disabled Person	2007 - 2023	Dark blue on Delicate Arch graphic; International Symbol of Access at left	Life Elevated	AB12C	ZA01A to ZP99W	
	Disabled Person	2023 - December 2024	As above, but with thinner, squarer characters (using North Carolina dies)	Life Elevated	AB12C	ZP01X to ZR99Z	
		January 2025 - Present	As above, but with flat print.	Life Elevated	AB12C	ZA01A to ZU63N (as of August 18, 2026)	
	Motorcycle	1985	Embossed blue on white; "UTAH" embossed in blue at top, offset to left	none	123 AB	001 AA to approximately 999 ET	
	Motorcycle	1994	Embossed dark blue on white; "Utah" screened in red at top, offset to right	none	123AB	001FA to approximately 999KZ	
	Motorcycle	1992	As 1992 Centennial passenger base, with "UTAH" in white	Centennial	123AB	001ZA to approximately 999VP (see right)	Issued concurrently with the 1985 and 1994 bases. The first letter in the serial progressed backwards (so 999ZZ was followed by 001YA, 999YZ was followed by 001XA, and so on).
	Motorcycle	2008 to 2023	As 2007 Ski passenger base	Greatest Snow on Earth / Life Elevated	A12BC	A01AA to E99BZ	Issued concurrently. On the Arch base, the first letter in the serial progresses backwards (so Z99ZZ was followed by Y01AA, Y99ZZ was followed by X01AA, and so on).
	Motorcycle	2023–present	As above, but with thinner, squarer characters (using North Carolina dies)	Greatest Snow on Earth / Life Elevated	A12BC	E01CA to E04HP (as of May 6, 2025)	Issued concurrently. On the Arch base, the first letter in the serial progresses backwards (so Z99ZZ was followed by Y01AA, Y99ZZ was followed by X01AA, and so on).
	Motorcycle	2008 - 2023	As 2007 Arch passenger base	Life Elevated	A12BC	Z01AA to U99NZ	Issued concurrently. On the Arch base, the first letter in the serial progresses backwards (so Z99ZZ was followed by Y01AA, Y99ZZ was followed by X01AA, and so on).
	Motorcycle	2023–present	As above, but with thinner, squarer characters (using North Carolina dies)	Life Elevated	A12BC	U01RA to T87BM (as of September 9, 2025)	Issued concurrently. On the Arch base, the first letter in the serial progresses backwards (so Z99ZZ was followed by Y01AA, Y99ZZ was followed by X01AA, and so on).
	Motorcycle	2017 – present	As 'In God We Trust' passenger base	In God We Trust / United We Stand	ABC1	AAA0 to DMY4 (as of October 16, 2026)	
	Temporary	varies	Hand-written date on paper	none	MM-DD-YY	A 00000 to Z 99999, then AA 00000 to DC 09474 (as of November 28, 2024)	Hologram on bottom right valid for 30 days
	Trailer	1985	As 1985 Ski passenger base	Greatest Snow on Earth	12345 A	00001 A to approximately 40000 E	
	Trailer	1992	As 1985 Ski passenger base	Greatest Snow on Earth	12345 A	40001 E to approximately 17000 R	Narrower serial dies.
	Trailer	2008	As 2007 Ski passenger base	Greatest Snow on Earth / Life Elevated	123456A	000001A to 274729A (as of January 18, 2025)	Issued concurrently.
	Trailer	2008	As 2007 Arch passenger base	Life Elevated	123456A	000001Z to 434773Z (as of November 16, 2024)	Issued concurrently.
	Apportioned Truck	2008	As 2007 Ski passenger base	Greatest Snow on Earth / Life Elevated	A000000	A000000 to A069622 (as of February 10, 2025)	
	Apportioned Truck	2008	As 2007 Arch passenger base	Life Elevated	Z000000	Z000000 to Z095872 (as of November 15, 2024)	
	Apportioned Trailer	2008	As 2007 Ski passenger base	Greatest Snow on Earth / Life Elevated	A000000	A500000 to A542473 (as of November 22, 2024)	
	Apportioned Trailer	2008	As 2007 Arch passenger base	Life Elevated	Z000000	Z500000 to Z524843 (as of November 19, 2024)	
	Off-Highway Vehicle	January 1, 2023	Plain Desert Tan base; "UTAH" and plate dies in black (using North Carolina dies)	Off-Highway Vehicle	1AB23	0AA00 to 7HX02 (as of August 16, 2026)	Issued to off-highway vehicles only. These plates CANNOT be personalized.

=== Deprecated ===
Image	Type	First issued	Design	Serial format	Notes
	Commercial 1/4 Year	October 1, 1957	Colors unknown; "4 Expires Dec. 31 1957" at bottom	UTAH 1234	
	Commercial 1/4 Year	October 1, 1963	White on orange; "UTAH 63" at bottom; "EXP 31 DEC" at left	12345	
	Commercial 1/4 Year	January 1, 1967	White on brown; "UTAH 67" at bottom; "EXP 31 MAR" at left	12345	
	Commercial 1/4 Year	April 1, 1967	White on red; "UTAH 67" at bottom; "EXP 30 JUNE" at left	12345	
	Commercial 1/4 Year	July 1, 1967	White on blue; "UTAH 67" at bottom; "EXP 30 SEPT" at left	12345	
	Commercial 1/4 Year	October 1, 1967	White on black; "UTAH 67" at bottom; "EXP 31 DEC" at left	12345	
	Commercial 1/4 Year	October 1, 1971	White on green; "UTAH 71" at top; "EXP 31 DEC" at left	12345	
	Commercial 1/4 Year	July 1, 1972	White on green; "UTAH 72" at bottom; "EXP 30 SEPT" at left	12345	
	Commercial 1/4 Year	October 1, 1972	White on brown; "UTAH 72" at bottom; "EXP 31 DEC" at left	12345	
	Commercial 1/4 Year	July 1, 1973	Blue on white; "UTAH 73" at bottom; "EXP 30 SEPT" at left	12345	

== Optional plates ==
Utah currently offers over 60 optional license plates. With the exception of the Amateur Radio Operator & Historic Black & White plates, all use the same serial format – originally 1234A (with a high of 4285U), then A123B (A001A to M999Z), and now 12AB3 (00AA1 to 99FB9) alongside the generic disabled plate.

=== Current ===
Image	Type	First issued	Design	Slogan	Serials issued	Notes
	Amateur Radio		Full color design depending on the special group.	Amateur Radio		The serial number is the operator's FCC call sign.
	Autism Awareness		Full color design depending on the special group.	Support Autism Awareness		
	Boy Scouts of America		Full color design depending on the special group.	Scouting Teaches Values		
	Boys and Girls Clubs		Full color design depending on the special group.	Boys & Girls Clubs		
	Cancer Research		Full color design depending on the special group.	Changing the DNA of Cancer Care		
	Children's Issues		Full color design depending on the special group.	Invest in Children		
	Civil Air Patrol	2019	Full color design depending on the special group.	Civil Air Patrol		
	Brigham Young University - Academic	July 1, 2026	Full color design depending on the special group.	Brigham Young University		
	Brigham Young University - Athletic	July 1, 2026	Full color design depending on the special group.	Brigham Young University		
	Ensign College (Formerly LDS Business College)		Full color design depending on the special group.	Ensign College		
	Salt Lake Community College		Full color design depending on the special group.	Salt Lake Community College		
	Snow College		Full color design depending on the special group.	Snow College		
	Southern Utah University		Full color design depending on the special group.	Southern Utah University		
	University of Utah - Academic	July 1, 2026	Full color design depending on the special group.	University of Utah		
	University of Utah - Athletic	July 1, 2026	Full color design depending on the special group.	Utah Utes		
	Utah State University - Academic	July 1, 2026	Full color design depending on the special group.	Utah State Aggies		
	Utah State University - Athletic	July 1, 2026	Full color design depending on the special group.	Utah State Aggies		
	Utah Tech University (Formerly Dixie State University)		Full color design depending on the special group.	Utah Tech University		
	Utah Valley University		Full color design depending on the special group.	Utah Valley University		
	Weber State University - Academic	July 1, 2026	Full color design depending on the special group.	Weber State University		
	Weber State University - Athletic	July 1, 2026	Full color design depending on the special group.	Weber State		
	Western Governors University		Full color design depending on the special group.	Western Governors University		
	Westminster College		Full color design depending on the special group.	Go Griffins		
	Disabled Veteran		Full color design depending on the special group.	Disabled Veteran		
	Donate Life		Full color design depending on the special group.	Organ, Eye, & Tissue Donation Saves Lives		
	Emergency Medical Technician (EMT)		Full color design depending on the special group.	Emergency Medical Technician		
	Farm Vehicle		Full color design depending on the special group.	Farm Vehicle		
	Fire Fighter		Full color design depending on the special group.	Utah Firefighter		
	Former Prisoner of War (POW)		Full color design depending on the special group.	Prisoner of War		
	Fraternal Order		Full color design depending on the special group.	www.utahgrandlodge.org		
	Great Salt Lake Preservation	September 2025	Full color design depending on the special group.	Great Salt Lake		
	Gold Star		Full color design depending on the special group.	Honors Their Sacrifice		
	Historic Black and White	May 2023	White on black base	none	0AA000 to 3BK419 (as of October 29, 2026)	The serial format is different from the 1968 version, being 1AB234 instead of AB 1234. The serial dies are also different (using North Carolina dies) as used on the new Skier & Arches plates.
	Historic Black and White	May 2023	White on black base	none	00A00 to 32B56 (as of September 12, 2025	The motorcycle variant of the Historical Society plate.
	White and Black Classic	July 1, 2026	Black on white base	none	0ZZ000 to 6ZZ679 (as of November 16, 2026)	Serial format is similar to Historic Black and White plate, but starting from ZZ.
	Honoring Heroes		Full color design depending on the special group.	Honoring Heroes Foundation		
	Humanitarian Service		Full color design depending on the special group.	Utah Rotary		
	Live On - Suicide Prevention	May 2024	Full color design depending on the special group.	Prevent Suicide		
	Martin Luther King	2021	Full color design depending on the special group.	Many Stories, One Utah		
	National Basketball Association (NBA) – Utah Jazz	Originally released in 2015, redesigned in 2021. Complete overhaul on July 1, 2026.	Full color design depending on the special group.	Utah Jazz		
	National Guard		Full color design depending on the special group.	Americans at Their Best		
	National Hockey League - Utah Mammoth	July 1, 2026	Full color design depending on the special group.	Utah Mammoth		
	National Men’s Soccer – Real Salt Lake		Full color design depending on the special group.	Believe		
	No More Homeless Pets		Full color design depending on the special group.	Best Friends Animal Society		
	Pearl Harbor Survivor		Full color design depending on the special group.	Pearl Harbor Survivor		
	Public Education Support		Full color design depending on the special group.	I Support Public Education		
	Purple Heart/Combat Wounded		Full color design depending on the special group.	Combat Wounded		
	Search and Rescue Teams		Full color design depending on the special group.	Search and Rescue Team		
	Share the Road		Full color design depending on the special group.	Share the Road		
	Soil Conservation		Full color design depending on the special group.	Soil Conservation		
	State Legislator		Full color design depending on the special group.	Greatest Snow on Earth		
	US Congress		Full color design depending on the special group.	Greatest Snow on Earth		
	Utah Housing Opportunity (Realtor)		Full color design depending on the special group.	Protecting Homeownership		
	Utah Law Enforcement Memorial		Full color design depending on the special group.	Law Enforcement Memorial		
	Veterans - Air Force		Full color design depending on the special group.	Honors Veterans		
	Veterans – American Legion		Full color design depending on the special group.	Honors Veterans		
	Veterans - Army		Full color design depending on the special group.	Honors Veterans		
	Veterans – Coast Guard		Full color design depending on the special group.	Honors Veterans		
	Veterans - Marines		Full color design depending on the special group.	Honors Veterans		
	Veterans – Navy		Full color design depending on the special group.	Honors Veterans		
	Veteran Combat Theater – Air Force Combat Action Medal		Full color design depending on the special group.	Honors Veterans		
	Veteran Combat Theater – Army Combat Action Badge		Full color design depending on the special group.	Honors Veterans		
	Veteran Combat Theater – Army Combat Infantry Badge		Full color design depending on the special group.	Honors Veterans		
	Veteran Combat Theater – Marine & Navy Combat Action Ribbon		Full color design depending on the special group.	Honors Veterans		
	Wildlife - Elk		Full color design depending on the special group.	I Support Wildlife		
	Wildlife - Kestrel		Full color design depending on the special group.	I Support Wildlife		
	Wildlife - Mule Deer		Full color design depending on the special group.	I Support Wildlife		
	Wildlife - Trout		Full color design depending on the special group.	I Support Wildlife		
	Everyone Outdoors	July 1, 2026	Full color design depending on the special group.	Everyone Outdoors		
	Women's Suffrage	2018	Full color design depending on the special group.	First to Vote		
	Zion National Park	Originally released in 2009, redesigned in 2022. Redesigned again on July 1, 2026.	Full color design depending on the special group.	Zion Forever		

=== Discontinued Plates ===
Image	Type	Slogan	Date Discontinued	Design	Serial format	Serials issued	Notes
	2002 Winter Olympics	Olympic Winter Games 2002	1998 – June 30, 2002	black on multicolored	123A4	000A0 to 999T9	
	Clean Fuel - Clean Air	Clean Fuel - Clean Air	July 1, 2011	Dark blue on white base with an image on the left side of the plate.	0000A and A123B	Varies	Plate was discontinued on July 1, 2011.
	Wildlife - Great Blue Heron	I Support Wildlife	Unknown	Dark blue on white base with an image on the left side of the plate.	0000A	Varies	Unsure when this type was discontinued.
	Utah State University Eastern (Formerly College of Eastern Utah)	www.ceu.edu	Unknown	Dark blue on white base with an image on the left side of the plate.	Unknown	Varies	Plate is discontinued.
	Children's Heart Disease Awareness	I ❤ CHD Awareness	Never	Dark blue on white base with an image on the left side of the plate.	N/A	N/A	Approved in 2016, though this plate was never issued.
	Honorary Consulate	Honorary Consul	Unknown	Dark blue on white base with an image on the left side of the plate.	N/A	N/A	Unsure if this plate was ever produced. This plate does not show it is an option on the Utah DMV website.
	Prostate Cancer Awareness	Screening Saves Lives	October 1, 2017	Dark blue on white base with an image on the left side of the plate.	A123B	Varies	Plate was discontinued on October 1, 2017.
	Wildlife - Eagle	I Support Wildlife	November 1, 2017	Dark blue on white base with an image on the left side of the plate.	0000A and A123B	Varies	Plate was discontinued on November 1, 2017.
	Vintage Vehicle	Vintage Vehicle	July 1, 2025	Dark blue on white base with an image on the left side of the plate.	0000A, A123B, and 12AB3	Varies	Plate was discontinued on July 1, 2025.
	Special Interest Vehicles	Special Interest	July 1, 2026	Dark blue on white base with an image on the left side of the plate.	0000A, A123B, and 12AB3	Varies	Plate was discontinued on July 1, 2026.
	Snowmobiler	Snowmobiler	July 1, 2026	Dark blue on white base with an image on the left side of the plate.	0000A, A123B, and 12AB3	Varies	Plate was discontinued on July 1, 2026.

== Statistics ==
The Utah Motor Vehicle Division (DMV) publishes yearly statistics on vehicle license plates with active registrations.

On Highway Registrations by License Plate Type (2025)
Plate Type	Amount	% of total
LE Arches	1,202,359	35.9%
LE Skier	893,811	26.7%
In God We Trust	767,541	22.9%
B&W Historical Support	192,989	5.8%
Ski Utah	70,369	2.1%
Centennial	60,011	1.8%
Other	166,658	5.0%
State Total	3,353,738	100 %

== Errors ==
Plates with the bolder dies have been spotted using the 'M' and 'W' dies being stamped incorrectly. In this image, the 'W' die in V62 0BW was stamped with an upside down 'M' die. This has been spotted on a variety of serial sequences throughout the years.
