= Vehicle registration plates of Maine =

Maine vehicle license plates

Maine
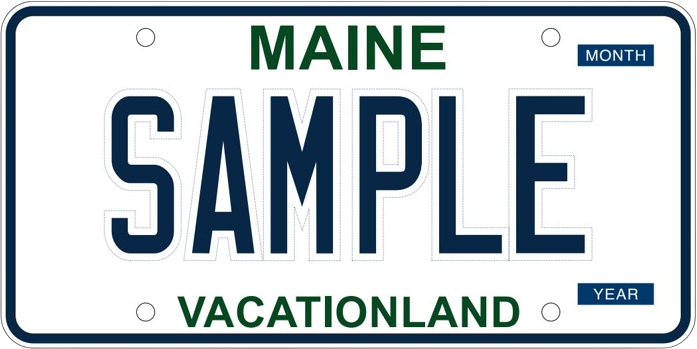

Current series
- Slogan: Vacationland
- Size: 12 in × 6 in 30 cm × 15 cm
- Material: Aluminum
- Serial format: 123·ABC
- Introduced: May 1, 2025

Availability
- Issued by: Department of the Secretary of State, Bureau of Motor Vehicles

History
- First issued: June 1, 1905

The U.S. state of Maine first required its residents to register their motor vehicles and display license plates in 1905. As of 2026, plates are issued by the Maine Bureau of Motor Vehicles, within the office of the Department of the Secretary of State. Front and rear plates are required for most classes of vehicles, while only rear plates are required for motorcycles and trailers.

Maine legislators effectively removed a potentially unconstitutional review process for vanity plates in 2015, which formerly was able to reject plates that were "obscene, contemptuous, profane or prejudicial." Due to a proliferation of vulgar plates over the following years, the legislature directed the Bureau of Motor Vehicles to establish new rules for reviewing plates in 2021. The new rules ban profane or obscene language, language inciting violence, and derogatory references "to age, race, ethnicity, sexual orientation, gender identity, national origin, religion or disability." A committee for vanity plates consults the online Urban Dictionary for assistance with "arcane lingo".

== Passenger baseplates ==
=== 1905 to 1949 ===
Image	Dates issued	Design	Slogan	Serial format	Serials issued	Notes
1234	1905–11	White serial on red porcelain plate; "MAINE" centered at bottom	none	12345	1 to approximately 10100	
1234	1912	Dark blue serial on yellow porcelain plate; "MAINE" centered at bottom	none	1234	1 to approximately 9200	
1234	1913	Yellow serial on dark blue porcelain plate; "MAINE" centered at bottom	none	12345	1 to approximately 11000	
12345	1914	White serial on dark blue porcelain plate; "MAINE 1914" at right	none	12345	1 to approximately 14500	First dated plate.
12345	1915	Dark blue serial on white porcelain plate; "MAINE 1915" at right	none	12345	1 to approximately 21500	
12345	1916	Embossed white serial on dark blue plate with border line; "MAINE 1916" at right	none	12345	1 to approximately 29000	
12-345	1917	Embossed dark blue serial on white plate with border line; "MAINE 1917" at right	none	12-345	1 to approximately 38-000	
	1918	Dark green serial on white flat metal plate; "MAINE 1918" centered at bottom	none	12-345	1 to approximately 42-000	
12-345	1919	Embossed white serial on maroon plate with border line; "MAINE 1919" centered at bottom	none	12-345	1 to approximately 48-000	
12345	1920	Embossed maroon serial on white plate with border line; "MAINE 1920" centered at bottom	none	12-345	1 to approximately 54-000	
	1921	Embossed white serial on maroon plate with border line; "MAINE 1921" centered at bottom	none	12-345	1 to approximately 68-000	
12-345	1922	Embossed white serial on dark blue plate with border line; "MAINE 1922" centered at bottom	none	12-345	1 to approximately 79-000	
12-345	1923	Embossed dark blue serial on white plate with border line; "MAINE 1923" centered at bottom	none	12-345	1 to approximately 90-000	
	1924	As 1922 base, but with "MAINE 1924" at bottom	none	123-456	1 to approximately 105-000	
	1925	As 1923 base, but with "MAINE 1925" at bottom	none	123-456	1 to approximately 115-000	
123-456	1926	Embossed golden yellow serial on dark blue plate with border line; "MAINE 1926" centered at bottom	none	123-456	1 to approximately 122-000	
	1927	Embossed dark blue serial on golden yellow plate with border line; "MAINE 1927" centered at bottom	none	123-456	1 to approximately 130-000	
	1928	Embossed dark blue serial on white plate with border line; "MAINE 1928" centered at bottom	none	123-456	1 to approximately 140-000	
123-456	1929	Embossed white serial on dark blue plate with border line; "MAINE 1929" centered at bottom	none	123-456	1 to approximately 145-000	
	1930	Embossed white serial on red plate with border line; "MAINE 1930" centered at bottom	none	123-456	1 to approximately 150-000	
123-456	1931	Embossed white serial on black plate with border line; "MAINE 1931" centered at bottom	none	123-456	1 to approximately 138-000	
123-456	1932	Embossed white serial on green plate with border line; "MAINE 1932" centered at bottom	none	123-456	1 to approximately 164-000	
	1933	Embossed white serial on black plate with border line; "MAINE 1933" centered at bottom	none	123-456	1 to approximately 157-000	
123-456	1934	Embossed black serial on orange plate with border line; "MAINE '34" at bottom	none	1-234	1 to 9-999	Small plates manufactured for 1934 and 1935 due to the Depression. In both years, the state name and year were centered on plates with the 1-234 and A123 serial formats, and offset to the right on plates with the A/B123 format.
123-456	1934	Embossed black serial on orange plate with border line; "MAINE '34" at bottom	none	A123	A1 to W999	Small plates manufactured for 1934 and 1935 due to the Depression. In both years, the state name and year were centered on plates with the 1-234 and A123 serial formats, and offset to the right on plates with the A/B123 format.
123-456	1934	Embossed black serial on orange plate with border line; "MAINE '34" at bottom	none	A/B123	A/A1 to approximately F/N999	Small plates manufactured for 1934 and 1935 due to the Depression. In both years, the state name and year were centered on plates with the 1-234 and A123 serial formats, and offset to the right on plates with the A/B123 format.
123-456	1935	Embossed white serial on blue plate with border line; "MAINE '35" at bottom	none	1-234	1 to 9-999	Small plates manufactured for 1934 and 1935 due to the Depression. In both years, the state name and year were centered on plates with the 1-234 and A123 serial formats, and offset to the right on plates with the A/B123 format.
123-456	1935	Embossed white serial on blue plate with border line; "MAINE '35" at bottom	none	A123	A1 to W999	Small plates manufactured for 1934 and 1935 due to the Depression. In both years, the state name and year were centered on plates with the 1-234 and A123 serial formats, and offset to the right on plates with the A/B123 format.
123-456	1935	Embossed white serial on blue plate with border line; "MAINE '35" at bottom	none	A/B123	A/A1 to approximately F/W999	Small plates manufactured for 1934 and 1935 due to the Depression. In both years, the state name and year were centered on plates with the 1-234 and A123 serial formats, and offset to the right on plates with the A/B123 format.
123-456	1936	Embossed white serial on black plate with border line; "MAINE 1936" centered at top	"VACATIONLAND" centered at bottom	123-456	1 to approximately 157-000	First use of the "Vacationland" slogan.
	1937	Embossed white serial on dark green plate with border line; "MAINE 1937" centered at top	"VACATIONLAND" centered at bottom	123-456	1 to approximately 162-000	
	1938	Embossed dark green serial on light green plate with border line; "MAINE 1938" centered at top	"VACATIONLAND" centered at bottom	123-456	1 to approximately 157-000	
	1939	Embossed silver serial on dark green plate with border line; "MAINE 1939" centered at top	"VACATIONLAND" centered at bottom	123-456	1 to approximately 160-000	
	1940	Embossed dark green serial on silver plate with border line; "MAINE 1940" centered at top	"VACATIONLAND" centered at bottom	123-456	1 to approximately 165-000	
123-456	1941	Embossed red serial on silver plate with border line; "MAINE 1941" centered at top	"VACATIONLAND" centered at bottom	123-456	1 to approximately 170-000	
	1942–43	Embossed black serial on beige plate with border line; "MAINE 1942" centered at top	"VACATIONLAND" centered at bottom	123-456	1 to approximately 177-000	Revalidated for 1943 with windshield stickers, due to metal conservation for World War II.
	1944	Embossed yellow serial on black plate with border line; "MAINE 1944" centered at top	"VACATIONLAND" centered at bottom	123-456	1 to approximately 155-000	
	1945	Embossed dark blue serial on white plate with border line; "MAINE 1945" centered at top	"VACATIONLAND" centered at bottom	123-456	1 to approximately 155-000	
	1946–47	Embossed white serial on dark blue plate with border line; "MAINE 1946" centered at top	"VACATIONLAND" centered at bottom	123-456	1 to approximately 204-000	Revalidated for 1947 with windshield stickers.
123-456	1948–49	Embossed orange serial on black plate with border line; "MAINE 1948" centered at top	"VACATIONLAND" centered at bottom	123-456	1 to approximately 223-000	Revalidated for 1949 with silver tabs.

=== 1950 to present ===
In 1956, the United States, Canada, and Mexico came to an agreement with the American Association of Motor Vehicle Administrators, the Automobile Manufacturers Association and the National Safety Council that standardized the size for license plates for vehicles (except those for motorcycles) at 6 inches (15 cm) in height by 12 inches (30 cm) in width, with standardized mounting holes. The 1955 (dated 1956) issue was the first Maine license plate that complied with these standards.

Image	Dates issued	Design	Slogan	Serial format	Serials issued	Notes
	1950–55	Embossed black serial on reflective white plate with border line; "MAINE" at top, offset to left, with metal tab slots to right	"VACATIONLAND" centered at bottom	123-456	1 to approximately 376-000	Validated for 1950 with silver tabs, for 1951 with red tabs, for 1952 with green tabs, for 1953 with gold tabs, for 1954 with silver tabs, and for 1955 with blue tabs.
	1956	Embossed black serial on reflective gold plate with border line; "MAINE 56" centered at top, with metal tab slots either side of year	"VACATIONLAND" centered at bottom	123-456	1 to 264-000	Revalidated for 1957 with red tabs, for 1958 with green tabs, for 1959 with white tabs, for 1960 with dark blue tabs, and for 1961 with orange tabs.
	1957–61	As above, but without "56"	"VACATIONLAND" centered at bottom	123-456	264-001 to approximately 463-000	Revalidated for 1957 with red tabs, for 1958 with green tabs, for 1959 with white tabs, for 1960 with dark blue tabs, and for 1961 with orange tabs.
	1962	Embossed black serial on reflective white plate with border line; "MAINE 62" at top, offset to left, with metal tab slots either side of year	"VACATIONLAND" centered at bottom	123-456	1 to 384-000	Revalidated for 1963 with yellow tabs, for 1964 with dark blue tabs, for 1965 with red tabs, for 1966 with yellow tabs, and for 1967 with black tabs.
	1963–67	As above, but without "62"	"VACATIONLAND" centered at bottom	123-456	384-001 to approximately 617-000	Revalidated for 1963 with yellow tabs, for 1964 with dark blue tabs, for 1965 with red tabs, for 1966 with yellow tabs, and for 1967 with black tabs.
	1968	Embossed black serial on reflective yellow plate with border line; "MAINE 68" at top, offset to left, with metal tab slots either side of year	"VACATIONLAND" centered at bottom	123-456	1 to 395-000	Revalidated with stickers; tab slots on 1968 plates never used.
	1969–73	As above, but without "68" and metal tab slots	"VACATIONLAND" centered at bottom	123-456	395-001 to approximately 793-000	Revalidated with stickers; tab slots on 1968 plates never used.
	1974–75	Embossed black serial on reflective white plate with border line; "MAINE 74" at top, offset to left	"VACATIONLAND" centered at bottom	123-456	1 to 488-000; 502-001 to 510-000	
	1975–78	As above, but without "74"	"VACATIONLAND" centered at bottom	123-456	488-001 to 502-000; 510-001 to 875-000	Embossed year replaced by revalidation stickers.
	1978–79	As above, but with "MAINE" centered at top	"VACATIONLAND" centered at bottom	123-456	875-001 to 999-999	
	1979 – June 30, 1987	As above, but with "MAINE" centered at top	"VACATIONLAND" centered at bottom	12345 A	1 A to 52000 N	
	July 1, 1987 – May; 1990	Embossed navy blue serial on reflective white plate with border line; red American lobster screened behind serial, offset to right; "MAINE" screened in red centered at top	"Vacationland" (with enlarged 'V') screened in red centered at bottom	12345 A	1 P to 99999 Z	
	May 1990 – April; 1993	Embossed navy blue serial on reflective white plate with border line; red American lobster screened behind serial, offset to right; "MAINE" screened in red centered at top	"Vacationland" (with enlarged 'V') screened in red centered at bottom	1234 AB	1 AA to 9999 ZZ; 1 AB to 9999 AY (see right)	Double-letter series issued first (AA, BB, CC, up to ZZ), followed by different-letter series (AB, AC, AD etc.) from September 1991.
	April 1993 – June 30, 1999	Embossed navy blue serial on reflective white plate with border line; red American lobster screened behind serial, offset to right; "MAINE" screened in red centered at top	"Vacationland" (with enlarged 'V') screened in red centered at bottom	1234 AB	1 AZ to 2999 ES	Narrower serial dies introduced.
	July 1, 1999 – October 2023	Embossed black serial on reflective white plate with border line; black-capped chickadee on pine cone and tassel screened at left and green pine forest silhouette screened at bottom; "MAINE" screened in black centered at top	"Vacationland" screened in black in center of pine forest silhouette	1234 AB	1 GA to 9999 ZY	Letter O not used in serials.
	October 2023 – April 30, 2025	Embossed black serial on reflective white plate with border line; black-capped chickadee on pine cone and tassel screened at left and green pine forest silhouette screened at bottom; "MAINE" screened in black centered at top	"Vacationland" screened in black in center of pine forest silhouette	123·ABC	101·JAA to 691·JQJ (as of May 2, 2025)	Initial letters A to E reserved for optional and certain non-passenger plate types; F to H reserved for alternative standard design since May 2025. The middle serial letter progresses first, followed by the final letter, and then the first one. Letters I and O not used in serials.
	May 1, 2025 – present	Embossed dark blue serial on reflective white plate with border line; pine tree screened at left and blue five-pointed star screened on top left; "MAINE" screened in dark green centered at top	"VACATIONLAND" screened in dark green centered at bottom	123·ABC	101·KAA to present	Design pays homage to the state flag used from 1901 to 1909.
	May 1, 2025 – present	Embossed dark blue serial on reflective white plate with border line; "MAINE" screened in dark green centered at top	"VACATIONLAND" screened in dark green centered at bottom	123·ABC	101·FAA to present	Alternative base; issued concurrently with the "pine tree" base.

== Optional plates ==
All optional plates introduced from 2003 onwards use a 123·ABC serial format, with blocks of three-letter series assigned for each plate as required.

Image	Type	Dates issued	Design	Slogan	Serial blocks assigned	Notes
	Lobster	May 1, 2003 – present	Embossed navy blue serial on graphic plate featuring a coast scene with green cliffs, a grey boathouse and a red American lobster at left; navy blue border line around plate; "MAINE" screened in black centered at top	"Lobster" screened in black centered at bottom	AAA–ABZ, AEB–AEZ, AXA–AXZ, BEA–BEZ, BLA–BLZ	Proceeds go towards the Maine Lobster Research, Education and Development Fund.
	Black Bear	November 3, 2003 – present	Embossed black serial on white and pale blue gradient plate with border line; logo of the Maine Black Bears screened at left; "MAINE" screened in light blue centered at top	Light blue band screened at bottom with "The University of Maine" in black in the center	ACA–ADZ	Proceeds go towards the Maine Black Bears Scholarship Fund.
	Wabanaki	August 12, 2005 – present	Embossed black serial on graphic plate featuring Mount Katahdin; black border line around plate; "MAINE" screened in dark red centered at top	"WABANAKI" screened in dark red centered at bottom	AFA–AFZ	Issued to members of the nations of the Wabanaki Confederacy.
	Agriculture	October 1, 2007 – present	Embossed black serial on graphic plate featuring an orange and yellow gradient sky, green hills, a farmhouse, a forest, and black silhouettes of an old man and a young girl at left; black border line around plate; "MAINE" screened in black centered at top	"Support Local Agriculture" screened in white centered at bottom	AGA–AGZ, ANA–ANZ, BCA–BCZ	Proceeds go towards the Maine Agriculture Education Fund.
	Support Our Troops	November 1, 2007 – present	Embossed black serial on white plate with border line; dark green forest screened at bottom and yellow ribbon on dark green three-dimensional state icon screened at left; "MAINE" screened in black centered at top	"We Support Our Troops" screened in yellow centered at bottom	AJA–AJZ	Proceeds go towards members of the Maine National Guard and their families.
	Sportsman	April 7, 2008 – present	Embossed black serial on white plate with border line; Mount Katahdin screened at top and moose and brook trout screened at left; "MAINE" screened in black centered at top	"SUPPORT WILDLIFE" screened in black centered at bottom	AKA–AKZ, ASA–ASZ, AVA–AVZ, BDA–BDZ, BHA–BHZ	Proceeds go towards funds including the Fish Hatchery Maintenance Fund and the Maine Endangered and Nongame Wildlife Fund.
	Breast Cancer	October 1, 2008 – present	Embossed pink serial on white plate with border line; pink ribbon on magenta state icon screened at left; "MAINE" screened in purple centered at top	"early detection saves lives" screened in purple centered at bottom	ALA–ALZ, ATA–ATZ, AYA–AYZ	Proceeds go towards the Breast Cancer Services Special Program Fund of the Maine Center for Disease Control and Prevention.
	Animal Welfare	October 1, 2009 – present	Embossed black serial on white plate with border line; silhouettes of cat, dog, bird, rabbit and horse screened at right; "MAINE" screened in red centered at top	Yellow band screened at bottom with "respect. love. adopt." in black offset to left	AMA–AMZ, AWA–AWZ, BGA–BGZ	Proceeds go towards Animal Welfare Auxiliary Fund and Companion Animal Sterilization Fund.
	The Barbara Bush Children's Hospital	October 1, 2018 – present	Embossed black serial on white plate with border line; Barbara Bush Children's Hospital logo screened at left; "MAINE" screened in black centered at top	"The Barbara Bush Children's Hospital, At Maine Medical Center" screened centered at the bottom.	BBA-BBZ, BJA–BJZ	Proceeds go towards The Barbara Bush Children's Hospital.

== Non-passenger plates ==
Image	Type	Dates issued	Design	Serial format	Serials issued	Notes
	Commercial	July 1, 1987 – June 30, 1999	As lobster passenger base; vertical embossed "COM" to left of serial	123456	350001 to approximately 570000	Narrower serial dies used from 500000 onwards.
	Commercial	July 1, 1999 – December 2007	As chickadee passenger base, but with embossed "COMMERCIAL" in place of slogan	123-456	600-001 to 799-999	
	Commercial	December 2007 – present	As chickadee passenger base, but with embossed "COMMERCIAL" in place of slogan	1A-2345	1A-0001 to present	
	Disabled	July 1, 1999 – present	As chickadee passenger base	12345	30000 to present	
	Low-Speed Vehicle	2003–present	As chickadee passenger base, but with embossed "LOW–SPEED" in place of slogan	123·AEA	101·AEA to present	
	Motorcycle	1988–95	Embossed blue serial on white plate with border line; "MAINE" at top; vertical "MC" at left	1234 A	4001 N to 9999 Z	
	Motorcycle	1995–97	Embossed blue serial on white plate with border line; "MAINE" at top; vertical "MC" at left	123 AB	1 AA to approximately 500 AR	
	Motorcycle	1998 – mid 2012	As above, with "RIDE SAFE" at bottom	123 AB	1 AT to approximately 500 HV	
	Motorcycle	mid 2012 – present	As above, but without "MC"	123 AB	501 HV to present	
	Long term trailer	2001-2018	Embossed green serial on white plate with border line; "MAINE" at top offset to left, "SEMI PERMANENT" at bottom; day of expiration at top right, vertical stacked "TLR" in between first two numbers and last 5 numbers	12 34567; 12 3456A	Coded by year of expiration (12)	Registered in periods between 3 and 25 years.
	Long term trailer	2018-2021	Embossed green serial on white plate with border line; "MAINE" and "SEMI PERMANENT" at top and bottom respectively; vertical stacked "TLR" between first two numbers and the rest of the serial	12 34567; 12 3456A	Coded by year of expiration (12)	Registered in periods between 3 and 25 years.
	Long term trailer	2022–present	Embossed green serial on white plate with border line; "MAINE" and "LONG TERM TLR" at top and bottom respectively	123-4567	500-0000 to present	
	Trailer	1988–95	Embossed blue serial on white plate with border line; "MAINE" and "TRAILER" at top and bottom respectively	A 12345	E 10001 to L 99999	
	Trailer	1995–present	Embossed blue serial on white plate with border line; "MAINE" and "TRAILER" at top and bottom respectively	A 123456	A 100001 to present	
