= Vehicle registration plates of Nevada =

Nevada vehicle license plates

Nevada
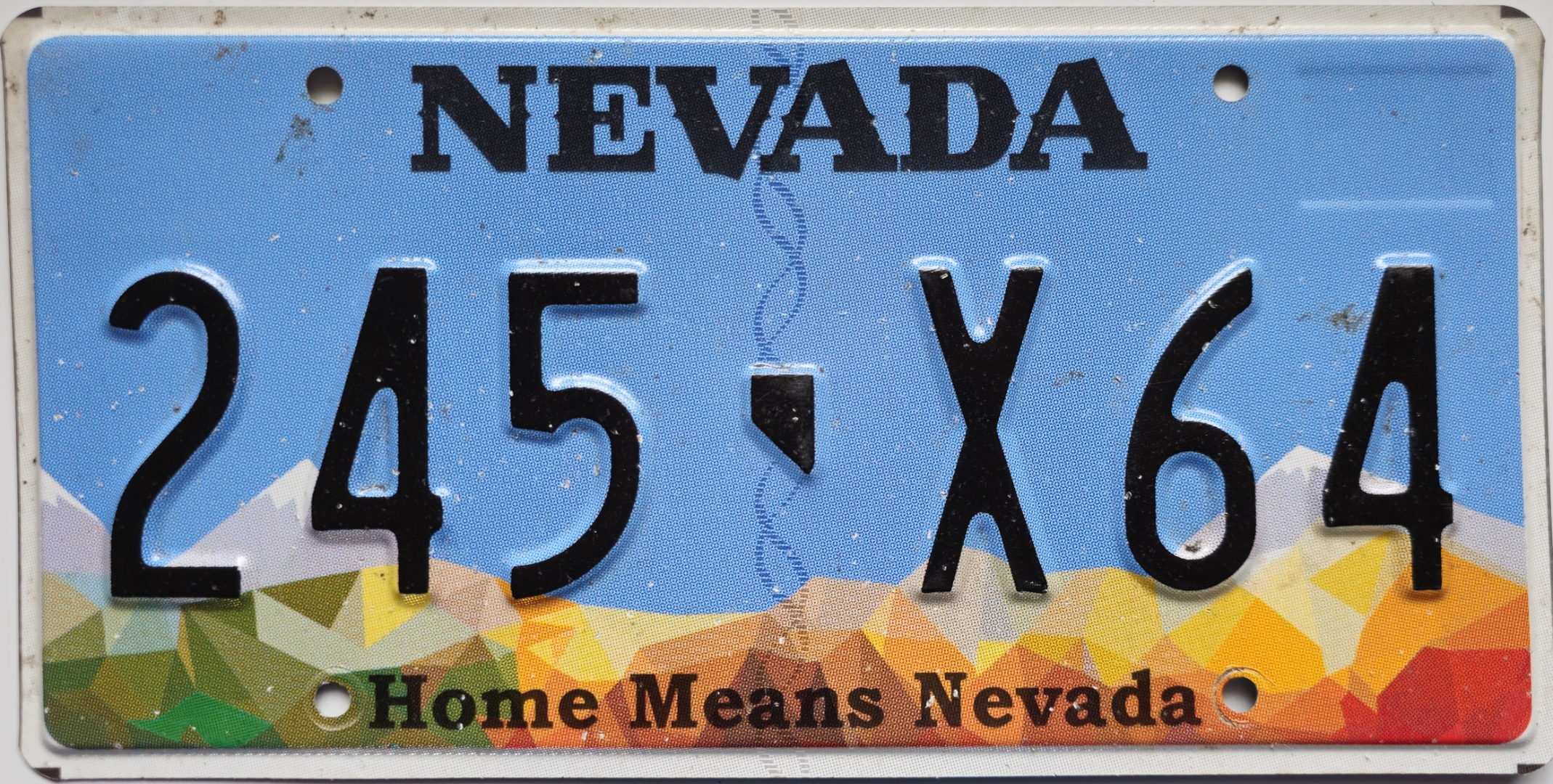

Current series
- Name: Home Means Nevada
- Slogan: Home Means Nevada
- Size: 12 in × 6 in 30 cm × 15 cm
- Material: Aluminum
- Serial format: 12A·345; 123·4A5
- Introduced: March 1, 2024

Availability
- Issued by: Nevada Department of Motor Vehicles
- Manufactured by: Northern Nevada Correctional Center

History
- First issued: January 1, 1916 (pre-state plates from 1913 through December 31, 1915)

The U.S. state of Nevada first required its residents to register their motor vehicles in 1913. Registrants provided their own license plates for display until 1916, when the state began to issue plates.

As of 2026, plates are issued by the Nevada Department of Motor Vehicles (DMV). Front and rear plates are required for most classes of vehicles, while only rear plates are required for motorcycles and trailers. Front plates are not required if the vehicle was not designed for a front plate and the manufacturer did not provide a means of mounting such a plate.

From 1928 to 2012, Nevada's license plates were made at Nevada State Prison. The license plate factory moved to the Northern Nevada Correctional Center in 2012.

== Passenger baseplates ==
=== 1916 to 1960 ===
In 1956, the United States, Canada, and Mexico came to an agreement with the American Association of Motor Vehicle Administrators, the Automobile Manufacturers Association and the National Safety Council that standardized the size for license plates for vehicles (except those for motorcycles) at 6 inches (15 cm) in height by 12 inches (30 cm) in width, with standardized mounting holes. The 1956 (expired June 30, 1957) issue was the first Nevada license plate that fully complied with these standards: the 1955 (expired June 30, 1956) issue was 6 inches in height by 12 inches in width, but had non-standard mounting holes.

No slogans were used on passenger plates during the period covered by this subsection.

Image	Dates issued	Description	Serial format	Serials issued	Notes
	1916	Embossed yellow serial on green plate; vertical "NEV" at left	1234	2001 to approximately 6700	
	1917	Silver serial on blue flat metal plate; "NEVADA" and "1917" centered at top and bottom respectively	12345	10001 to approximately 16700	
	1918	Black serial on yellow flat metal plate; "NEVADA" and "1918" centered at top and bottom respectively	12345	20001 to approximately 28400	
	1919	Red serial on white flat metal plate; "NEVADA, 1919" centered at top	12345	30001 to approximately 39400	
	1920	Yellow serial on red flat metal plate; "NEVADA, 1920" centered at bottom	12345	40001 to approximately 50500	
	1921	Green serial on white flat metal plate; "NEVADA 1921" at bottom	12-345	50-001 to approximately 60-900	
	1922	Black serial on gray flat metal plate; "NEVADA 1922" at bottom	12-345	70-001 to approximately 82-800	
	1923	Debossed yellow serial on black plate with border line; "NEVADA 1923" at bottom	12-345	80-001 to approximately 95-700	
	1924	Debossed white serial on green plate with border line; "NEVADA 1924" at bottom	12-345	00-001 to approximately 18-500	
	1925	Debossed white serial on purple plate with border line; "NEVADA 1925" at bottom	12-345	00-001 to approximately 17-500	
	1926	Debossed yellow serial on black plate with border line; "NEVADA 1926" at bottom	12-345	00-001 to approximately 21-000	
	1927	Debossed yellow serial on green plate with border line; "NEVADA 1927" at bottom	12-345	00-001 to approximately 21-000	
	1928	Embossed white serial on red plate with border line; "NEVADA 1928" at bottom	12-345	00-001 to approximately 22-000	
	1929	Embossed black serial on orange plate with border line; "NEVADA 1929" at bottom	12-345	1 to approximately 25-000	
	1930	Embossed orange serial on black plate with border line; "NEVADA 1930" at bottom	12-345	1 to approximately 25-000	
	1931	Embossed black serial on orange plate with border line; "NEVADA 1931" at bottom	12-345	1 to approximately 24-000	
	1932	Embossed orange serial on black plate with border line; "NEVADA 1932" at bottom	12-345	1 to approximately 28-000	
	1933	Embossed white serial on green plate with border line; "NEVADA 1933" at bottom	12-345	1 to approximately 26-000	
	1934	Embossed green serial on white plate with border line; "NEVADA 1934" at bottom	12-345	1 to approximately 26-000	
	1935	Embossed white serial on green plate with border line; "NEVADA 1935" at bottom	12-345	1 to approximately 28-000	
	1936	Embossed silver serial on dark blue plate with border line; "NEVADA 1936" at bottom	12-345	1 to approximately 31-000	
	1937	Embossed dark blue serial on silver plate with border line; "NEVADA 1937" at bottom	12-345	1 to approximately 34-000	
	1938	As 1936 base, but with "NEVADA 1938" at bottom	12-345	1 to approximately 34-000	
	1939	As 1937 base, but with "NEVADA 1939" at bottom	12-345	1 to approximately 34-000	
	1940	As 1936 base, but with "NEVADA 1940" at bottom	12-345	1 to approximately 38-000	
	1941	As 1937 base, but with "NEVADA 1941" at bottom	12-345	1 to approximately 40-000	
	1942–43	As 1936 base, but with "NEVADA 1942" at bottom	12-345	1 to approximately 45-000	Revalidated for 1943 with red tabs, due to metal conservation for World War II.
	1944	Embossed white serial on red plate with border line; "NEVADA 1944" at bottom	12-345	1 to approximately 44-000	
	1945	As 1937 base, but with "NEVADA 1945" at bottom	12-345	1 to approximately 41-000	
	1946	As 1936 base, but with "NEVADA 1946" at bottom	12-345	1 to approximately 44-000	
	1947	As 1937 base, but with "NEVADA 1947" at bottom	12-345	1 to approximately 46-000	
	1948	As 1936 base, but with "NEVADA 1948" at bottom	12-345	1 to approximately 53-000	
	1949	As 1937 base, but with "NEVADA 1949" at bottom	12-345	1 to approximately 55-000	
	1950	As 1936 base, but with "NEVADA 1950" at bottom	12-345	1 to approximately 57-000	
	1951	As 1937 base, but with "NEVADA 1951" at bottom	12-345	1 to approximately 67-000	
	1952	As 1936 base, but with "NEVADA 1952" at bottom	12-345	1 to approximately 74-000	
	1953	Embossed copper serial on green plate with border line; "NEVADA 1953" at bottom	12-345	1 to approximately 82-000	
	1954–55	As 1936 base, but with "NEVADA 1954" at bottom	A/ 1–234; A/B1-234	Coded by county of issuance	Validated from January 1 through June 30, 1955 with red sticker.
	1955–56	Embossed blue serial on silver plate with border line; "NEVADA 6 30 56" at bottom	A/ 1234; A/B1234	Coded by county of issuance	
	1956–57	Embossed silver serial on light blue plate with border line; "NEVADA" centered at top; "56" at top left and "57" at top right	A12345; AB1234	Coded by county of issuance	
	1957–58	Embossed light blue serial on silver plate with border line; "NEVADA" centered at top; "EXP" at top left and "JUN 58" at top right	A12345; AB1234	Coded by county of issuance	
	1958–59	Embossed silver serial on light blue plate with border line; "NEVADA" centered at top; "EXP" at top left and "JUN 59" at top right	A12345; AB1234	Coded by county of issuance	
	1959–60	Embossed blue serial on white plate with border line; "NEVADA" centered at top; "EXP" at top left and "JUN 60" at top right	A12345; AB1234	Coded by county of issuance	

=== 1960 to present ===
Image(s)	Dates issued	Description	Slogan	Serial format	Serials issued	Notes
	1960–64	Embossed silver serial on dark blue plate with border line; "NEVADA" centered at top; "JUN 61" at top left and state outline at top right	none	A12345; AB1234	Coded by county of issuance	Revalidated with stickers through December 31, 1964. To commemorate Nevada's 100 years of statehood that year, dark blue strips were fitted to the top of each plate containing "NEVADA CENTENNIAL" in silver in the center, "1864" to the left and "1964" to the right.
	1965–67	Embossed dark blue serial on silver plate with border line; "NEVADA" centered at top; "65" at top left	none	A12345; AB1234; A/B12345	Coded by county of issuance	Counties with two-letter codes issued five-digit serials with stacked codes after reaching 9999.
	1967–68	As above, but reflective white rather than silver	none	A12345; AB1234; A/B12345	Coded by county of issuance	Counties with two-letter codes issued five-digit serials with stacked codes after reaching 9999.
	1969–70	Debossed white serial on reflective blue plate with border line; "NEVADA" centered at top; "69" at top left	none	A12345; AB1234; ABC123	Coded by county of issuance	
	1970–74	As above, but with "NEV" at top, offset to left	none	A12345; AB1234; ABC123	Coded by county of issuance	
	1974–81	As above, but with thinner dies and "NEVADA" at top, offset to left	none	A12345; AB1234; ABC123	Coded by county of issuance	
	1982–84	As above, but with "NEVADA" roughly centered at top	none	123ABC	001AAA to approximately 999ANR	Some plates carried the county of issuance on a sticker at the bottom.
	1984 – December 2000	Embossed blue serial on reflective white and silver graphic plate with mountain scene featuring a Bighorn sheep; "NEVADA" screened in blue centered at top	"THE SILVER STATE" screened in blue centered at bottom	123·ABC	001·BAA to approximately 999·LDE	Awarded "Plate of the Year" for best new license plate of 1985 by the Automobile License Plate Collectors Association, the first and, to date, only time Nevada has been so honored. Co-recipient with North Dakota.
	January 2001 – December 2006	Embossed dark blue serial on graphic plate featuring the Sierra Nevada mountains, in light blue, against a yellow and orange gradient sky; "NEVADA" screened in dark blue centered at top	"THE SILVER STATE" screened in white centered at bottom	123·ABC	001·MAA to 999·TUU	Letters I, O and Q not used in serials; this practice continues today.
	December 2006 – April; 2015	As above, but with serial screened rather than embossed	"THE SILVER STATE" screened in white centered at bottom	123·ABC	001·TUV to 999·YZZ; 001·LDF to 999·LZZ; 001·ANS to 999·AZZ	After 999·YZZ was issued, the 'L' series not issued on the 1984 sheep base were issued, followed by the 'A' series not issued on the 1982 blue base. 'Z' series reserved for issuance through dealerships (up to the ZZZ series on the "Home Means Nevada" base as of March 2024).
	April – July; 2015	As above, but with serial screened rather than embossed	"THE SILVER STATE" screened in white centered at bottom	12A·345	00A·000 to 56B·999	
	July; 2015 – mid-2017	As above, but with serial embossed (different dies to those used from 2001 to 2006) and state shape used as separator	"THE SILVER STATE" screened in white centered at bottom	12A·345	57B·000 to 48H·999	Issued concurrently with the "Home Means Nevada" base from 2016/11/1 until supplies were exhausted.
	November 1, 2016 – early 2024	Embossed black serial with state-shaped separator on sky blue plate; stylized multi-colored mountain range at bottom; "NEVADA" screened in black centered at top	"Home Means Nevada" screened in black at bottom, in center of mountain range	123·A45	000·A00 to 999·Z99	
	November 1, 2016 – early 2024	Embossed black serial with state-shaped separator on sky blue plate; stylized multi-colored mountain range at bottom; "NEVADA" screened in black centered at top	"Home Means Nevada" screened in black at bottom, in center of mountain range	123·ABC	000·ZDK to 999·ZZZ	Dealer-issue series
	March 2024 – present	Embossed black serial with state-shaped separator on sky blue plate; stylized multi-colored mountain range at bottom; "NEVADA" screened in black centered at top	"Home Means Nevada" screened in black at bottom, in center of mountain range	123·4A5	000·0A0 to 999·2G4 (as of June 26, 2026)	
	March 2024 – present	Embossed black serial with state-shaped separator on sky blue plate; stylized multi-colored mountain range at bottom; "NEVADA" screened in black centered at top	"Home Means Nevada" screened in black at bottom, in center of mountain range	12A·345	49H·000 to 99L·345 (as of June 26, 2026)	

== County coding, 1954–81 ==
County	1954–56	1- and 2-letter codes, 1956–81	3-letter codes, 1969–81
Churchill	A	CH	CHA–CHX
Clark	B, B/A – B/D	C, CA–CF, CJ–CZ	CAA–CGZ, CJA–CZZ, TAA–TLU
Douglas	C	DS	DSA–DSZ, DAA–DAB
Elko	F	EL	ELA–ELZ, EAA–EAC
Esmeralda	G	ES	
Eureka	H	EU	
Humboldt	J	HU	HUA–HUK
Lander	K	LA	
Lincoln	L	LN	
Lyon	N	LY	LYA–LYF
Mineral	P	MN	MNA–MND
Nye	R	NY	NYA–NYP
Ormsby / Carson City	S	OR	ORA–ORZ, OAA–OCH
Pershing	U	PE	
Storey	V	ST	
Washoe	W, W/A – W/B	W, WA (1965–68 only)	WAA–WOZ, WRA–WRX
White Pine	X	WP	WPA–WPJ

== Non-passenger plates ==
Image	Type	First issued	Description	Serial format	Serials issued	Notes
	Apportioned Bus		Blue serial on white plate; "NEVADA" and "APPORTIONED" screened in blue centered at top and bottom respectively	12345 A	00001 A to present	
	Apportioned Truck		As Apportioned Bus plate, but without "APPORTIONED" at bottom	12345 P	00001 P to present	
	Dealer		Same design as passenger base	D/L/R12345	D/L/R00001 to present	
	Exempt		Same design as passenger base	E/X12345	E/X00001 to present	
	Handicapped		Same design as passenger base	12345	00001 to 99999	
	Handicapped	2009	Same design as passenger base	A1234	A0001 to present	
	Loan		Same design as passenger base	L/O/A/N12345	L/O/A/N00001 to present	
	Motorcycle	2005	Similar to Sierra Nevada passenger base, but with border line	123456	000001 to approximately 044000	
	Motorcycle	2007	As above, but with screened serial and no border line	123456	044001 to approximately 288000	
	Motorcycle	2017	Similar to Home Means Nevada passenger base	123456	288001 to present	
	Trailer		Same design as passenger base	12345 A	00001 E to present	Letters E, F, G, H, J, K, L, M, S, U, V, W, X and Y have been used.

== Optional types ==
=== Charitable & Collegiate plates ===
Image	First issued	Description	Serial format	Serials issued	Notes
		Agriculture	A/G1234	0001-9999	
		Animal Appreciation	S/N1234	0001-9999	
	May 2012	Autonomous Vehicle	A/U123	A/U001 to present	Autonomous vehicles are currently not available to the general public.
		Children in the Arts	A/R1234	A/R0001 to A/R9999	
		Children in the Arts	A/RA123	A/RA001 to present	
	October 2011	Conserve Wildlife	C/W1234		
		Hoover Dam	B/C1234	0001-9999	
		Hot August Nights	R/S1234	0001-9999	
	February 1998	Lake Tahoe	LT12345	LT00001-LT99999	Originally embossed; became screened circa 2005 at approximately LT31800.
		Las Vegas Centennial with image of Welcome to Fabulous Las Vegas sign	L/V1234	0001-ZZZZ	
		Missing and Exploited Children	M/X1234	M/X0001 to M/X9999	
		Missing and Exploited Children	M/XA123	M/XA001 to present	
		Mount Charleston	M/T1234	0001-9999	
		Nevada Test Site	A/T1234	0001-9999	
		Organ Donor	D/L1234	0001-9999	
		Preserve Pyramid Lake	P/L1234	0001-9999	
	June 2008	Red Rock Canyon	R/C1234	0001-9999	
		Reno Air Races	R/R1234	0001-9999	
		Rodeo	N/R1234	N/R0001 to N/R9999	
		Rodeo	N/RA123	N/RA001 to present	
		Support Wildlife	S/W1234	0001-9999	
	October 2004	United We Stand	U/S1234	U/S0001 to U/S9999	
	October 2004	United We Stand	U/SA123	U/SA001 to U/SZ999	
	October 2004	United We Stand	U/S123A	U/S001A to present	
		UNLV Collegiate	12345	00001-99999	Full serial number has a prefix of ULV. Redesigned March 2010.
	September 2011	UNR Collegiate	12345	00001-99999	Original design first issued 1993; the current design includes the slogan "Go Pack!". Full serial number has a prefix of UNR.
		Veterans	1234	0001-9999	
		Virginia & Truckee Railroad	V/T1234	0001-9999	

=== Classic Vehicle plates ===
Image	First issued	Description	Serial format	Serials issued	Notes
		Antique Truck/Truck-Tractor	123	001-999	Full serial number has a prefix of AVT.
		Classic Rod	1234	0001-9999	Full serial number has a prefix of CROD.
		Classic Vehicle	1234	0001-9999	Full serial number has a prefix of CVEH.
		Fire Truck	1234	0001-9999	Full serial number has a prefix of FT.
		Horseless Carriage	12	01-99	
		Old Timer	1234	0001-9999	Full serial number has a prefix of OT.
		Old Timer Motorcycle	12	01-99	Full serial number has a prefix of OTM.
		Street Rod	1234	0001-9999	Full serial number has a prefix of SROD.
		Vintage		various	

=== Firefighter plates ===
Image	First issued	Description	Serial format	Serials issued	Notes
		Professional Firefighter	P/F1234	P/F0001 to present	
		Volunteer Firefighter	V/F1234	V/F0001 to present	

=== Organization plates ===
Image	First issued	Description	Serial format	Serials issued	Notes
		Amateur Radio	FCC call sign		
		Civil Air Patrol	1234		Full serial number has a prefix of CVAP.
		Hall of Fame	123		Full serial number has a prefix of HF.
		Honorary Consular	123		Full serial number has a prefix of CON.
		Masonic Lodge	M/S1234		
		National Guard	1234		
		Press	123		Full serial number has a prefix of PRS.

=== Veterans plates ===
Image	First issued	Description	Serial format	Serials issued	Notes
		Air Force	1234	0001-9999	Full serial number has a prefix of VF.
		Air National Guard	1234	0001-9999	Full serial number has a prefix of GA.
		Army	1234	0001-9999	Full serial number has a prefix of VA.
		Army Airborne	1234	0001-9999	
		Army National Guard	1234	0001-9999	Full serial number has a prefix of GS.
		Coast Guard	1234	0001-9999	Full serial number has a prefix of VC.
		Congressional Medal of Honor	12	01-99	Full serial number has a prefix of CONMH.
		Disabled Veteran	1234	0001-9999	Full serial number has a prefix of DV.
		Ex-Prisoner of War	123	001-999	Full serial number has a prefix of POW.
		Marines	1234	0001-9999	Full serial number has a prefix of VM.
		Navy	1234	0001-9999	Full serial number has a prefix of VN.
		Pearl Harbor Survivor	123	001-999	Full serial number has a prefix of PHS.
		Pearl Harbor Veteran	123	001-999	Full serial number has a prefix of PHV.
		Purple Heart	12345	00001-99999	Full serial number has a prefix of HRT.

== Discontinued non-passenger and optional plate types ==
Image	Type	First issued	Last issued	Serial format(s)	Serials issued	Notes
	Commemorative: 125 Years of Vision	November 1, 1989	October 31, 1990	12345N	00001N to approximately 24000N	Commemorated Nevada's 125 years of statehood. Remained valid until 1997.
	White Motorcycle/Small Trailer	?	2005	ABC		
	Nevada Libraries	April 18, 2005	December 31, 2006	N/L1234	N/L0001 to approximately N/L1300	
	Aviation	May 31, 2005	December 31, 2006	A/V1234	A/V0001 to approximately A/V1050	
	Ducks Unlimited	August 1, 2005	December 31, 2006	D/U1234	D/U0001 to approximately D/U2450	
	Nevada Tourism	June 27, 2005	December 31, 2007	N/V1234	N/V0001 to approximately N/V2550	
	Carpenters	October 15, 2007	December 31, 2009	U/B1234	U/B0001 to ?	
	Search and Rescue	September 15, 2008	December 31, 2009	S/R1234	S/R0001 to ?	
	Las Vegas Springs	September 2000	December 31, 2013	V/S12345	V/S00001 to approximately V/S02700	
	Las Vegas Federal Lands	March 2005	December 31, 2013	F/L1234	F/L0001 to ?	
	March of Dimes	April 15, 2013	December 31, 2014	S/C1234	S/C0001 to approximately S/C0600	
	Teamsters Local 631	April 15, 2013	December 31, 2014	T/M1234	T/M0001 to approximately T/M0550	
	Air Force Thunderbirds	August 12, 2013	December 31, 2014	S/D1234	S/D0001 to approximately S/D0600	
	Share the Road	December 1, 2014	December 31, 2016	P/B1234	P/B0001 to ?	
	City of Reno	January 4, 2016	December 31, 2017	R/N1234	R/N0001 to approximately R/N0600	
	Horse Power	June 21, 2007	December 31, 2018	H/P1234; H/PA123	H/P0001 to H/P9999; H/PA001 to approximately H/PE999	
	Great Reno Balloon Race	May 22, 2017	December 31, 2018	G/R1234	G/R0001 to ?	
	Heritage of Sparks	December 18, 2017	December 31, 2019	H/S1234	H/S0001 to ?	
