= Vehicle registration plates of North Carolina =

North Carolina vehicle license plates

North Carolina
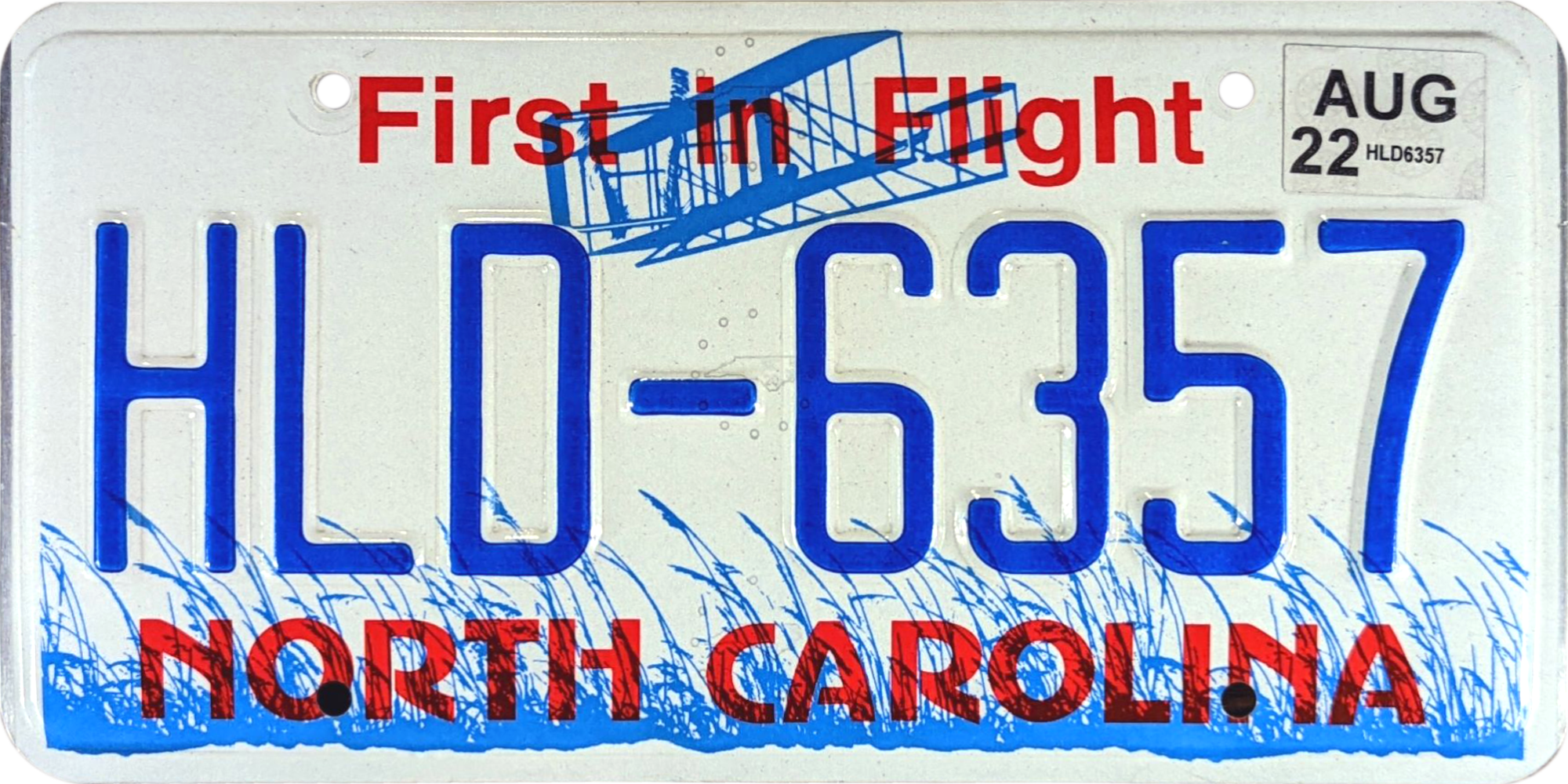
- Current "First in Flight" plate

Current series
- Slogan: Standard: First in Flight; Alternative from 2015: First in Freedom; Alternative from 2019: In God We Trust; To Be Rather Than to Seem
- Size: 12 in × 6 in 30 cm × 15 cm
- Material: Aluminum
- Serial format: ABC-1234
- Introduced: First in Flight: 1982; First in Freedom: July 1, 2015; In God We Trust: July 1, 2019

Availability
- Issued by: North Carolina Department of Transportation, Division of Motor Vehicles

History
- First issued: April 1, 1913 (county plates from 1907 through June 30, 1909; pre-state plates from July 1, 1909 through March 31, 1913)

The U.S. state of North Carolina first required its residents to register their motor vehicles in 1907. Registrants provided their own license plates for display until 1913, when the state began to issue plates.

As of 2026, plates are issued by the North Carolina Department of Transportation (NCDOT) through its Division of Motor Vehicles. Only rear plates have been required since 1956.

== Passenger baseplates ==
=== 1913 to 1974 ===
In 1956, the United States, Canada, and Mexico came to an agreement with the American Association of Motor Vehicle Administrators, the Automobile Manufacturers Association and the National Safety Council that standardized the size for license plates for vehicles (except those for motorcycles) at 6 inches (15 cm) in height by 12 inches (30 cm) in width, with standardized mounting holes. The 1955 (dated 1956) issue was the first North Carolina license plate that complied with these standards.

Image	Dates issued	Design	Slogan	Serial format	Serials issued	Notes
	1913	White serial on black porcelain plate; vertical "NC" at right and "EXPIRES JUNE 30-13" at bottom	none	1234	6801 to approximately 8000	Issued only to new registrants from April 1 through June 30, 1913, with serials following on from those on pre-state-issued plates.
	1913–14	Red serial on white porcelain plate; vertical "NC" at right and "EXPIRES JUNE 30-14" at bottom	none	12345	1 to approximately 13000	Issued to all registrants.
	1914–15	White serial on green porcelain plate; vertical "NC" at right and "EXPIRES JUNE 30-15" at bottom	none	12345	1 to approximately 17000	
	1915–16	Black serial on gray porcelain plate; vertical "NC" at right and "EXPIRES JUNE 30-16" at bottom	none	12345	1 to approximately 25000	
	1916–17	Embossed white serial on dark blue plate with border line; "NC" monogram and "6-30 1917" at right	none	12345	1 to approximately 40000	First embossed plate. From the collection of Richard Watson.
	1917–18	Embossed dark blue serial on white plate with border line; "NC" monogram and "6-30 1918" at right	none	12-345	1 to approximately 65-000	
	1918–19	Embossed white serial on black plate; "NC" monogram and "6-30 1919" at right	none	12-345	1 to approximately 80-000	
	1919–20	Embossed black serial on yellow plate with border line; "N.C. 6-30 1920" at left	none	12-345; 123456	1 to approximately 106000	
	1920–21	Embossed white serial on brown plate; white lines at top and bottom borders; "NC" monogram and "6-30 1921" at right	none	123-456	1 to approximately 131-000	
	1921–22	Embossed black serial on white plate with border line; "NC" monogram and "6-30 22" at right	none	123-456	1 to approximately 213-000	
	1922–23	Embossed white serial on green plate with border line; vertical "NC" at right and "6-30-23" centered at bottom	none	123456	1 to approximately 181000	
	1923–24	Embossed maroon serial on light gray plate with border line; "N.C.-6-30-24" centered at top	none	123-456	1 to approximately 262-000	
	1924–25	Embossed white serial on dark blue plate with border line; "NC" monogram and "6-30 25" at left	none	123.456	1 to approximately 320.000	
	1925–26	Embossed black serial on orange plate with border line; diagonal "NC" and "6-30-26" at right	none	123-456	1 to approximately 348-000	
	1926–27	Embossed white serial on black plate with border line; "NC" monogram and horsepower class at right; "6 30 27" at left	none	123-456	1 to approximately 421-000	Horsepower classes were A (over 35 hp), B (31-35 hp), C (26-30 hp) and E (25 hp and under); a block of serials was assigned to each class, with E having the biggest block. This continued through 1928.
	1927	Embossed red serial on white plate with border line; vertical "NC" at left; horsepower class and "27" at right	none	123-456	100-001 to approximately 496-000	Issued only from July 1 through December 31, 1927.
	1928	Embossed white serial on green plate with border line; vertical "NC" at right; horsepower class and "28" at left	none	123-456	100-001 to approximately 556-000	
	1929	Embossed white serial on sky blue plate with border line; "NORTH CAROLINA-1929" at bottom	none	123-456	100-001 to approximately 580-000	First use of the full state name. Horsepower classes same as 1926–28 but no letter used for the 25 hp and under class; for the other classes, the letter was carried at the right of the plate. This happened again in 1930.
	1930	Embossed white serial on maroon plate with border line; "NORTH CAROLINA–1930" at top	none	123-456	100-001 to approximately 607-000	
	1931	Embossed yellow serial on black plate; horsepower class number used as separator; "NORTH CAROLINA–31" at bottom	none	123-456	100-001 to approximately 483-000	Last year of horsepower classes; same as 1926–30 but numbered 1–4 in decreasing order of power.
	1932	Embossed black serial on yellow plate; "NORTH CAROLINA–32" at top	none	123-456	100-001 to approximately 415-000	
	1933	Embossed white serial on dark blue plate; "NORTH CAROLINA–33" at bottom	none	123-456	100-001 to approximately 464-000	
	1934	Embossed yellow serial on black plate; "NORTH CAROLINA–34" at top	none	123-456	100-001 to approximately 493-000	
	1935	Embossed silver serial on black plate; "NORTH CAROLINA–35" at bottom	none	123-456	100-001 to approximately 518-000	
	1936	Embossed light green serial on black plate; "NORTH CAROLINA–36" at top	none	123-456	100-001 to approximately 545-000	
	1937	Embossed yellow serial on black plate; "NORTH CAROLINA–37" at bottom	none	123-456	200-001 to approximately 651-000	Serials 100-001 through 200-000 reserved for trucks; this practice continued through 1946.
	1938	Embossed black serial on yellow plate; "NORTH CAROLINA–38" at top	none	123-456	200-001 to approximately 646-000	
	1939	Embossed silver serial on maroon plate; "North Carolina 39" centered at bottom	none	123-456	200-001 to approximately 686-000	
	1940	Embossed maroon serial on silver plate; "North Carolina 40" centered at bottom	none	123-456	200-001 to approximately 705-000	
	1941	Embossed golden yellow serial on black plate; "North Carolina 41" centered at bottom	none	123-456	200-001 to approximately 775-000	
	1942–43	Embossed black serial on golden yellow plate; "NORTH CAROLINA 42" at bottom	none	123-456	200-001 to approximately 762-000	Revalidated for 1943 with black tabs, due to metal conservation for World War II.
	1944	Embossed golden yellow serial on black plate; "NORTH CAROLINA 44" at top	none	123-456	200-001 to approximately 707-000	
	1945	Embossed black serial on tan plate; "NORTH CAROLINA 45" at bottom	none	123-456	200-001 to approximately 703-000	
	1946	Embossed golden yellow serial on black plate; "NORTH CAROLINA 46" at top	none	123-456	200-001 to approximately 748-000	
	1947	Embossed black serial on golden yellow plate; "NORTH CAROLINA 47" at top	none	123-456	100-001 to approximately 682-000	Serials 800-001 through 999-999 reserved for trucks and farm vehicles; this practice continued through 1949.
	1948	Embossed golden yellow serial on black plate; "NORTH CAROLINA 48" at top	none	123-456	100-001 to approximately 760-000	
	1949	Embossed black serial on golden yellow plate; "NORTH CAROLINA 49" at bottom	none	123-456	100-001 to 800-000	From the personal collection of Richard Watson.
	1949	Embossed black serial on golden yellow plate; "NORTH CAROLINA 49" at bottom	none	A-12345	W-1001 to approximately W-14000	From the personal collection of Richard Watson.
	1950	Embossed golden yellow serial on black plate; "NORTH CAROLINA 50" at bottom	none	123-456	100-001 to 760-000	Serials 760-001 through 999-999 reserved for trucks and farm vehicles; this practice continued through 1955.
	1950	Embossed golden yellow serial on black plate; "NORTH CAROLINA 50" at bottom	none	A-12345	W-1001 to W-99999; R-1001 to approximately R-74000	Serials 760-001 through 999-999 reserved for trucks and farm vehicles; this practice continued through 1955.
	1951	Embossed red serial on white plate; "NORTH CAROLINA 51" at bottom	none	123-456	100-001 to 760-000	
	1951	Embossed red serial on white plate; "NORTH CAROLINA 51" at bottom	none	A-12345	W and R series; N-1001 to approximately N-39000	
	1952	Embossed white serial on red plate; "NORTH CAROLINA 52" at bottom	none	123-456	100-001 to 760-000	
	1952	Embossed white serial on red plate; "NORTH CAROLINA 52" at bottom	none	A-12345	W and R series; N-1001 to approximately N-76000	
	1953	Embossed golden yellow serial on black plate; "NORTH CAROLINA 53" or "N.C.", slogan and "53" at bottom (see right)	none, or "DRIVE SAFELY" between state abbreviation and year	123-456	100-001 to 760-000	
	1953	Embossed golden yellow serial on black plate; "NORTH CAROLINA 53" or "N.C.", slogan and "53" at bottom (see right)	none, or "DRIVE SAFELY" between state abbreviation and year	A-12345	W, R and N series; X-1001 to approximately X-46000	
	1954	Embossed black serial on golden yellow plate; "NORTH CAROLINA 54" or "N.C.", slogan and "54" at bottom	none, or "DRIVE SAFELY" between state abbreviation and year	123-456	100-001 to 760-000	
	1954	Embossed black serial on golden yellow plate; "NORTH CAROLINA 54" or "N.C.", slogan and "54" at bottom	none, or "DRIVE SAFELY" between state abbreviation and year	A-12345	W, R and N series; X-1001 to approximately X-96000	
	1955	Embossed golden yellow serial on black plate; "NORTH CAROLINA 55" at bottom	none	123-456	100-001 to 760-000	
	1955	Embossed golden yellow serial on black plate; "NORTH CAROLINA 55" at bottom	none	A-12345	W, R, N, X and A series; V-1001 to approximately V-22000	
	1956	Embossed black serial on golden yellow plate with border line; "NORTH CAROLINA 56" at bottom	"DRIVE SAFELY" centered at top	A-1234; AB-1234		Serials progressed as follows: A-1 through A-9999, AA-1 through AZ-9999, B-1 through B-9999, BA-1 through BZ-9999, etc. Some series ran only to 1000 rather than 9999. This continued through 1972. Letters G, I, O and Q not used; this practice continued through 1968.
	1957	Embossed golden yellow serial on black plate with border line; "NORTH CAROLINA 57" at bottom	"DRIVE SAFELY" centered at top	A-1234; AB-1234		
	1958	As 1956 base, but with "NORTH CAROLINA 58" at bottom	"DRIVE SAFELY" as on 1956 base	A-1234; AB-1234		
	1959	As 1957 base, but with "NORTH CAROLINA 59" at bottom	"DRIVE SAFELY" as on 1957 base	A-1234; AB-1234		
	1960	As 1956 base, but with "NORTH CAROLINA 60" at bottom	"DRIVE SAFELY" as on 1956 base	A-1234; AB-1234		
	1961	As 1957 base, but with "61 NORTH CAROLINA" at bottom	"DRIVE SAFELY" as on 1957 base	A-1234; AB-1234		
	1962	As 1956 base, but with "62 NORTH CAROLINA" at bottom	"DRIVE SAFELY" as on 1956 base	A-1234; AB-1234		
	1963	Embossed golden yellow serial on black plate with border line; "NORTH CAROLINA 63" at top	"DRIVE SAFELY" centered at bottom	A-1234; AB-1234		
	1964	Embossed black serial on golden yellow plate; "NORTH CAROLINA" at top; "64" centered at bottom	none	A-1234; AB-1234		
	1965	Embossed golden yellow serial on black plate; "NORTH CAROLINA" at top; "1965" centered at bottom	none	A-1234; AB-1234		
	1966	Embossed black serial on golden yellow plate with border line; "1966" centered at top; "NORTH CAROLINA" at bottom	none	A-1234; AB-1234		
	1967	Embossed green serial on reflective white plate with border line; "1967" centered at top; "NORTH CAROLINA" at bottom	none	A-1234; AB-1234		
	1968	Embossed red serial on reflective white plate with border line; "NORTH CAROLINA" at top; "1968" centered at bottom	none	A-1234; AB-1234		
	1969	Embossed green serial on reflective white plate with border line; "NORTH CAROLINA" at top; "19" at bottom left and "69" at bottom right	none	A-1234; AB-1234		Letters G, I, O, Q and U not used in serials; this practice continues today.
	1970	Embossed red serial on reflective white plate with border line; "19" at top left and "70" at top right; "NORTH CAROLINA" at bottom	none	A-1234; AB-1234		
	1971	Embossed green serial on reflective white plate with border line; "71" centered at top; "NORTH CAROLINA" at bottom	none	A-1234; AB-1234		
	1972	Embossed blue serial on reflective white plate with border line; "NORTH CAROLINA" at top; "19" at bottom left and "72" at bottom right	none	A-1234; AB-1234		
	1973	Embossed red serial on reflective white plate with border line; "19" at top left and "73" at top right; "NORTH CAROLINA" at bottom	none	ABC-123	AAA-101 to approximately HVA-999	
	1974	Embossed green serial on reflective white plate with border line; "1974" centered at top; "NORTH CAROLINA" at bottom	none	ABC-123	AAA-101 to approximately JBA-999	

=== 1975 to present ===
Image	Dates issued	Design	Slogan	Serial format	Serials issued	Notes
	1975–78	Embossed red serial on reflective white plate with border line; vertical "75" used as separator; "NORTH CAROLINA" at bottom	"FIRST IN FREEDOM" centered at top	ABC-123	AAA-101 to approximately PMZ-999	First base to be revalidated with stickers. Monthly staggered registration introduced 1981. Plates from AAA-101 through JAY-999 replaced 1982; all other plates replaced by 1992.
	1978–80	As above, but without "75" and slogan	none	ABC-123	PNA-101 to approximately SXZ-999	First base to be revalidated with stickers. Monthly staggered registration introduced 1981. Plates from AAA-101 through JAY-999 replaced 1982; all other plates replaced by 1992.
	1980–81	As above, but with "1980" centered at top	none	ABC-123	SYA-101 to approximately XFZ-999	First base to be revalidated with stickers. Monthly staggered registration introduced 1981. Plates from AAA-101 through JAY-999 replaced 1982; all other plates replaced by 1992.
	1981–82	As above, but with "NORTH CAROLINA" at top and "1981" centered at bottom	none	ABC-123	XHA-101 to approximately YJZ-999	First base to be revalidated with stickers. Monthly staggered registration introduced 1981. Plates from AAA-101 through JAY-999 replaced 1982; all other plates replaced by 1992.
	1982	As above, but with "1982" centered at bottom	none	ABC-123	YKA-101 to approximately ZRZ-999	First base to be revalidated with stickers. Monthly staggered registration introduced 1981. Plates from AAA-101 through JAY-999 replaced 1982; all other plates replaced by 1992.
	1982	Blue on reflective white with light blue Wright Flyer graphic	"First in Flight" screened at top	ABC-123	ZSA-101 to ZZZ-999	Awarded "Plate of the Year" for best new license plate of 1982 by the Automobile License Plate Collectors Association, the first and, to date, only time North Carolina has been so honored.
	1982	Blue on reflective white with light blue Wright Flyer graphic	"First in Flight" screened at top	ABC-12; ABC-100	AAA-11 to XZZ-100	Awarded "Plate of the Year" for best new license plate of 1982 by the Automobile License Plate Collectors Association, the first and, to date, only time North Carolina has been so honored.
	1982–85	Blue on reflective white with light blue Wright Flyer graphic	"First in Flight" screened at top	ABC-123	AAA-101 to JAY-999	Awarded "Plate of the Year" for best new license plate of 1982 by the Automobile License Plate Collectors Association, the first and, to date, only time North Carolina has been so honored.
	1985 – April; 2007	Blue on reflective white with light blue Wright Flyer graphic	"First in Flight" screened at top	ABC-1234	ANA-1001 to approximately WTF-1975	Second letter in serials strictly N through Z (so AZZ was followed by BNA, BZZ was followed by CNA, and so on); this practice continued until ZZZ-9999 was issued in 2010. Since 1999, OBX has been issued as a special series for Dare County.
	April 2007 – October 2009	Red on reflective white with light blue Wright Flyer graphic	"First in Flight" as above	ABC-1234	WTF-1976 to approximately ZND-9999	Mainly issued as replacements for earlier "First in Flight" plates with the ABC-123 and ABC-12 serial formats, plus the ABC-1234 format up to JZZ-9999.
	October 2009 – December 2010	Blue on reflective white with light blue Wright Flyer graphic	"First in Flight" as above	ABC-1234	ZNE-1001 to ZZZ-9999	Blue serials reintroduced following complaints that the red serials were too hard to read from a distance.
	December 2010 – present	Blue on reflective white with light blue Wright Flyer graphic	"First in Flight" as above	ABC-1234	AAA-1001 to LKE-7520 (as of June 4, 2025)	Standard issue plate. Second letter in serials strictly A through M (so AMZ was followed by BAA, BMZ was followed by CAA, and so on); this practice should continue until at least NMZ-9999 is issued.
	July 1, 2015 – present	Blue on reflective white with quill pen graphic	"First In Freedom" screened at top	ABC-1234	PAA-1001 to RKT-1298 (as of May 6, 2025)	Alternative issue. Includes dates of May 20, 1775 and April 12, 1776 commemorating the adoption of the Mecklenburg Declaration and Halifax Resolves, respectively. Second letter in serials strictly A through M (so PMZ was followed by RAA, and RMZ will be followed by SAA).
	July 1, 2019 – present	Blue on reflective white with national flag motif at top	"IN GOD WE TRUST" screened at top; "To Be Rather Than to Seem" screened between serial and state name	ABC-1234	TAA-1001 to VFT-7102 (as of May 12, 2025)	Alternative issue. "To Be Rather Than to Seem" is the English translation of the state motto, Esse quam videri. Second letter in serials strictly A through M (so TMZ was followed by VAA, VMZ will be followed by WAA, and so on).(Note that this plate, along with newer versions of the 2 plates above, feature an updated "8" digit to further differentiate it from the "B".)

== Non-passenger plates ==
Image	Type	Dates issued	Design	Serial format	Serials issued	Notes
	Apportioned Truck	2006–present	Embossed blue on white with border line; "N.C. PERMANENT" at top; "APPORTIONED" at bottom	LB-1234; MB-1234; NB-1234; DB-1234A	LA-1001 to MC-9999; MH-1001 to MR-9999; NH-1001 to NW-9999; TD-1001 to TE-9999; VT-1001 to VX-9999; DD-1001A to present	
	Farm Truck		Embossed red on white with border line; "COMMERCIAL" at top; "FARM TRUCK–NC" at bottom	WB-1234; XB-1234; YB-1234	WA-1001 to present	
	For Hire	2006–present	Embossed blue on white with border line; "NORTH CAROLINA" at bottom; "FOR HIRE" at top	ZB-1234; BB-1234A	ZB-1001 to ZT-9999; BB-1001A to present	Issued annually through 2005.
	Manufacturer		Embossed blue on white with border line; "NORTH CAROLINA" at bottom; "MANUFACTURER" at top	MF-1234	MF-1001 to present	
	Moped	2015–present	Embossed black on white with border line; "N.C. MOPED" at top	MB12345	MA10000 to present	
	Motorcycle	1999–present	Embossed blue on white with border line; "N.C." at top	1A2345	1A0001 to present	Letter advances before leftmost number (1A-1Z, 2A-2Z, etc.). G, I, O, Q and U not used.
	Multi-Year Trailer	1993–present	Embossed black on white with border line; "NORTH CAROLINA" at top; "MULTI YEAR" at bottom	AB-12345; DB-12345	AY-10000 to AZ-99999; AA-10000 to AM-99999; DA-10000 to present	Permanent trailer plate obtained for a one-time fee.
	Special Mobile Equipment	2006–present	Embossed blue on white with border line; "NORTH CAROLINA" at bottom; "SPEC MOBILE" at top	ME-1234	ME-1001 to present	Issued annually through 2005.
	Taxi	2006–present	Embossed blue on white with border line; "NORTH CAROLINA" at bottom; "TAXI" at top	TB-1234	TA-1001 to present	Issued annually through 2005.
	Trailer	1995–present	Embossed red on white with border line; "NORTH CAROLINA" at bottom; "TRAILER" at top	AB-12345	AN-10000 to AX-99999; BA-10000 to present	
	Weighted	2004–present	Embossed blue on white with border line; "NORTH CAROLINA" at bottom; "WEIGHTED" at top	AB-1234; AB-1234A	?; AA-1001A to present	Issued annually through 2005. Required for vehicles weighing over 7,000 lbs, regardless of use.

== Temporary plates ==
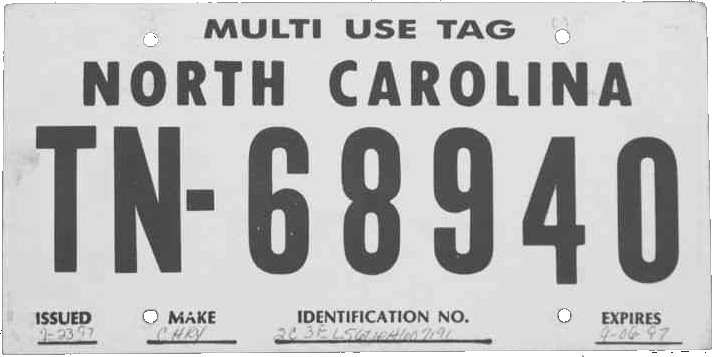
1997

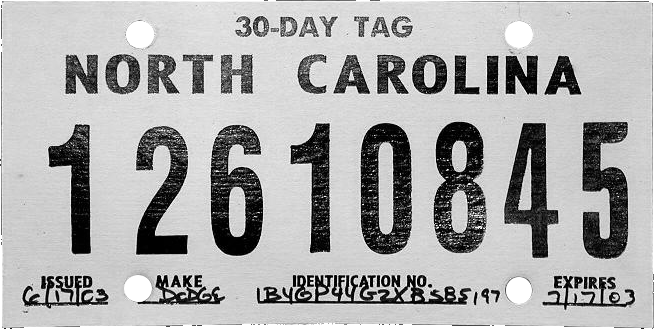
2003

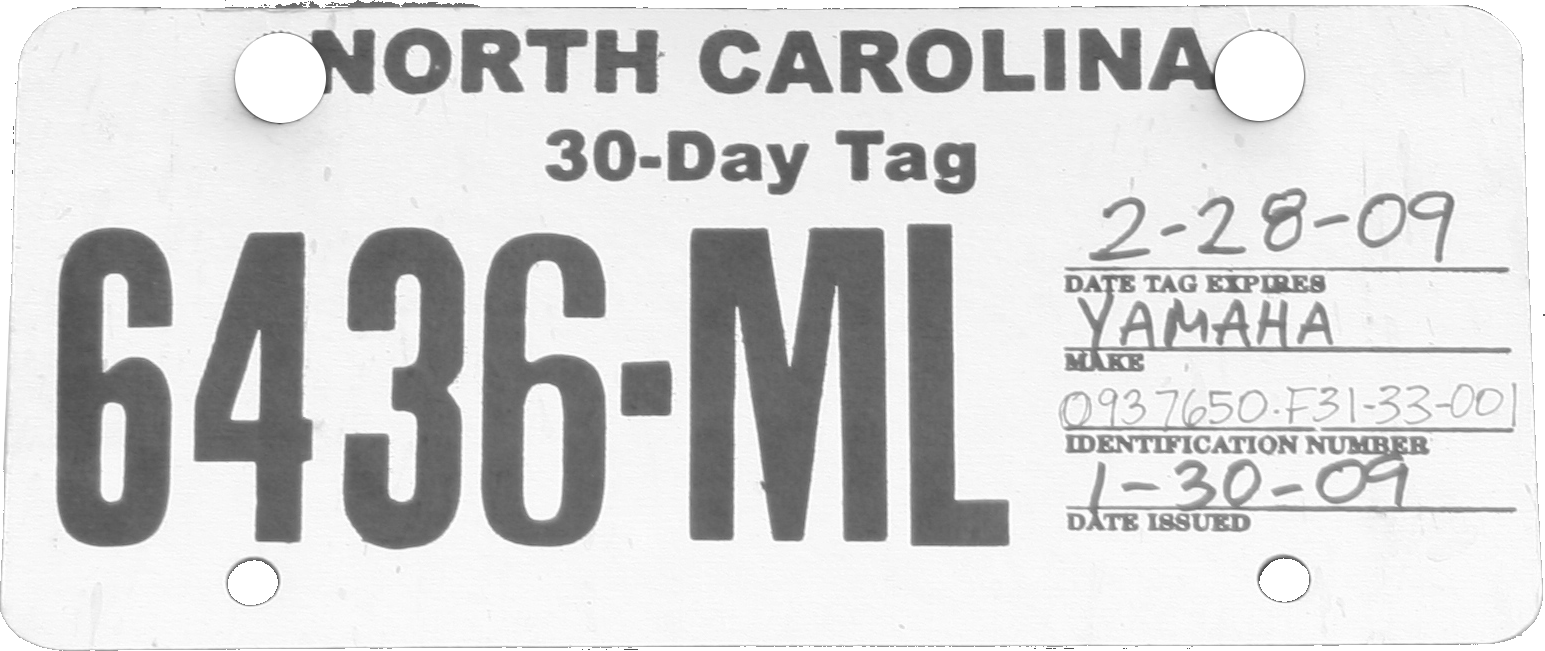
2009, motorcycle
