= Vehicle registration plates of the United States for 1970 =

1970 license plates in the United States

Vehicle registration plates of the United States by year
Vehicle registration plates of the United States for 1969	Events of 1970	Vehicle registration plates of the United States for 1971

Each of the 50 states of the United States of America plus several of its territories and the District of Columbia issued individual passenger license plates for 1970.

== Passenger baseplates ==
Passenger car plates
Image	Region	Design	Slogan	Serial format	Serials issued	Notes
	Alabama					
	Alaska					
	American Samoa					
	Arizona					
	Arkansas					
	California					
	Canal Zone					
	Colorado					
	Connecticut					
	Delaware					
	District of Columbia					
	Florida					
	Georgia	Embossed white lettering and borderline on blue base. State name embossed at top; date split between bottom two corners.	"PEACH STATE" embossed at bottom.			
	Guam					
	Hawaii					
	Idaho					
	Illinois					
	Indiana					
	Iowa					
	Kansas					
	Kentucky					
	Louisiana					
	Maine					
	Maryland					
	Massachusetts					
	Michigan					
	Minnesota					
	Mississippi					
	Missouri					
	Montana					
	Nebraska					
	Nevada					
	New Hampshire					
	New Jersey					
	New Mexico					
	New York					
	North Carolina	Embossed red serial on reflective white plate with border line; "19" at top left and "70" at top right; "NORTH CAROLINA" at bottom	none	A-1234; AB-1234		
	North Dakota					
	Northern Mariana; Islands					
	Ohio					
	Oklahoma					
	Oregon					
	Pennsylvania					
	Puerto Rico					
	Rhode Island					
	South Carolina					
	South Dakota					
	Tennessee					
	Texas					
	Utah					
	Vermont					
	Virginia					
	Washington					
	West Virginia					
	Wisconsin	Embossed black serial on yellow plate; "WISCONSIN" at bottom, slogan at top; month of expiration at bottom left, debossed "68" at bottom right	AMERICA'S DAIRYLAND	A12-345; AB 1234	Coded by month of expiration (A)	Revalidated for 1970 with black on orange stickers.
	Wyoming	Embossed yellow serial and Bucking Horse and Rider on dark green plate with border line; "WYO 70" at bottom right	none	1-1234; 1-123A; 1-A123; 1/0-1234; 1/0-123A	Coded by county of issuance (1 or 1/0)	

== Non-passenger plates ==
Non-passenger plates
Image (standard)	Region	Type	Design and slogan	Serial format	Serials issued	Notes
	Maryland	Temporary				
	Wisconsin	Light trailer	Embossed black serial on teal plate; "WISCONSIN" at bottom, "TRAILER" at top; "70" at bottom left	A12345	A 1 to approximately A12000	

== See also ==
- Antique vehicle registration
- Electronic license plate
- Motor vehicle registration
- Vehicle license
