= Vehicle registration plates of the United States for 1960 =

1960 license plates in the United States

Vehicle registration plates of the United States by year
Vehicle registration plates of the United States for 1959	Events of 1960	Vehicle registration plates of the United States for 1961

Each of the fifty states of the US plus many of its territories and the District of Columbia issued license plates for registered vehicles for the calendar year 1960.

In 1960, most states and territories issued plates that were valid for one year only and plates dated 1960 usually expired before December 31, though the expiration dates varied from state to state. A few states, such as New York, issued plates that could be renewed for at least one more year, subject to the payment to do so and the addition of a metal tab covering the original plate's expiration date and bearing the new year of expiration. Even fewer states issued multi-year plates that could be renewed annually using adhesive stickers. Only Massachusetts did not issue license plates dated 1960, instead revalidating 1959 plates with windshield stickers.

== Passenger baseplates ==
Passenger Car Plates
Image	Region	Design	Slogan	Serial format	Serials issued	Notes
	Alabama	Embossed white lettering and rims on blue base.	HEART OF DIXIE	12-3456		County-coded (12)
	Alaska					
	Arizona	Embossed white letters and rims on blue 1959 base. Renewal sticker for 1960 attached at top right.	GRAND CANYON STATE	ABC 123		County-coded (ABC)
	Arkansas					
	California					
	Canal Zone	Embossed black lettering on yellow background	none	12345		
	Colorado					
	Connecticut					
	Delaware					
	District of Columbia					
	Florida					
	Georgia					
	Guam					
	Hawaii					
	Idaho					
	Illinois					
	Indiana					
	Iowa					
	Kansas					
	Kentucky					
	Louisiana					
	Maine					
	Maryland					
	Massachusetts					
	Michigan					
	Minnesota					
	Mississippi					
	Missouri					
	Montana					
	Nebraska					
	Nevada					
	New Hampshire					
	New Jersey					
	New Mexico					
	New York					
	North Carolina					
	North Dakota					
	Ohio					
	Oklahoma					
	Oregon					
	Pennsylvania					
	Rhode Island					
	South Carolina					
	South Dakota					
	Tennessee					
	Texas					
	Utah					
	Vermont					
	Virginia					
	Washington					
	West Virginia					
	Wisconsin					
	Wyoming					

== Non-passenger plates ==
Non-passenger Plates
Image (standard)	Region	Type	Design & Slogan	Serial format	Serials issued	Notes

== See also ==
- Antique vehicle registration
- Electronic license plate
- Motor vehicle registration
- Vehicle license
