= Vehicle registration plates of the United States for 1964 =

1964 license plates in the United States

Vehicle registration plates of the United States by year
| Vehicle registration plates of the United States for 1963 | Events of 1964 | Vehicle registration plates of the United States for 1965 |

Each of the 50 states of the United States of America plus several of its territories and the District of Columbia issued individual passenger license plates for 1964.

== Passenger baseplates ==
Passenger Car Plates
| Image | Region | Design | Slogan | Serial format | Serials issued | Notes |
|---|---|---|---|---|---|---|
| | Alabama | | | | | |
| | Alaska | | | | | |
| | American Samoa | | | | | |
| | Arizona | | | | | |
| | Arkansas | | | | | |
| | California | | | | | |
| | Canal Zone | | | | | |
| | Colorado | | | | | |
| | Connecticut | | | | | |
| | Delaware | | | | | |
| | District of Columbia | | | | | |
| | Florida | | | | | |
| | Georgia | | | | | |
| | Guam | | | | | |
| | Hawaii | | | | | |
| | Idaho | | | | | |
| | Illinois | | | | | |
| | Indiana | | | | | |
| | Iowa | | | | | |
| | Kansas | | | | | |
| | Kentucky | | | | | |
| | Louisiana | Embossed white serial on dark blue plate with border line; "64 LOUISIANA 65" at bottom | "SPORTSMAN'S PARADISE" embossed at top. | 12A345; 123A456 | | Letter corresponds to state police troop office of issue |
| | Maine | | | | | |
| | Maryland | | | | | |
| | Massachusetts | | | | | |
| | Michigan | | | | | |
| | Minnesota | | | | | |
| | Mississippi | Embossed red lettering and border on white base; "MISSISSIPPI" and county name centered at top and bottom respectively | none | 12-3456; A-1234; 1A2345 | | Expired 31 October 1964. |
| | Missouri | | | | | |
| | Montana | | | | | |
| | Nebraska | | | | | |
| | Nevada | | | | | |
| | New Hampshire | | | | | |
| | New Jersey | | | | | |
| | New Mexico | | | | | |
| | New York | | | | | |
| | North Carolina | | | | | |
| | North Dakota | | | | | |
| | Northern Mariana; Islands | | | | | |
| | Ohio | | | | | |
| | Oklahoma | | | | | |
| | Oregon | | | | | |
| | Pennsylvania | | | | | |
| | Puerto Rico | | | | | |
| | Rhode Island | | | | | |
| | South Carolina | | | | | |
| | South Dakota | | | | | |
| | Tennessee | | | | | |
| | Texas | | | | | |
| | Utah | | | | | |
| | Vermont | | | | | |
| | Virginia | | | | | |
| | Washington | | | | | |
| | West Virginia | | | | | |
| | Wisconsin | | | | | |
| | Wyoming | | | | | |

== Non-passenger plates ==
Non-passenger Plates
| Image (standard) | Region | Type | Design & Slogan | Serial format | Serials issued | Notes |

== See also ==
- Antique vehicle registration
- Electronic license plate
- Motor vehicle registration
- Vehicle license
