= Vehicle registration plates of the United States for 1963 =

1963 license plates in the United States

Vehicle registration plates of the United States by year
| Vehicle registration plates of the United States for 1962 | Events of 1963 | Vehicle registration plates of the United States for 1964 |

Each of the 50 states of the U.S. plus several of its territories and the District of Columbia issued individual passenger license plates for the year 1963.

== Passenger baseplates ==
Passenger Car Plates
| Image | Region | Design | Slogan | Serial format | Serials issued | Notes |
|---|---|---|---|---|---|---|
| | Alabama | Reflective white lettering and designs on blue base | HEART OF DIXIE embossed at top | 12-34567 | Coded by county of issuance: 0-12345; 00-12345 | |
| | Alaska | Embossed blue numbers on white plate with border line; embossed state flag at left; "ALASKA" embossed in blue block letters centered at bottom; "62" embossed in bottom right corner | None | 12345; A1234 | 1 to 99999; A1000 to approximately E3250 | Revalidated for 1963 with blue tabs |
| | Arizona | Embossed blue numbers on white plate with border line; "ARIZONA 61" embossed in blue block letters centered at top | "GRAND CANYON STATE" embossed in blue block letters centered at bottom | ABC-123 | CAA-001 to approximately DMC-999 | 1961 base revalidated for 1963 with stickers |
| | Arkansas | Embossed white numbers on dark blue plate with border line; "ARKANSAS 63" embossed in white block letters centered at top | LAND OF OPPORTUNITY embossed at bottom. | 1-2345; 12-3456 | | |
| | California | Gold lettering embossed on black base, non-reflective | None | ABC-123 | AAA 000 to ZZZ 999 | In addition to all plates in the section above these bases can be used for the year of manufacture program with appropriate year sticker. They can also be seen as regular registration with modern month/year stickers if the plates were originally registered to the vehicle. |
| | Canal Zone | Embossed yellow on black | Funnel For World Commerce | 12345 | | |
| | Colorado | Embossed green lettering and graphics on white base; mountains at bottom. | None | AB-1234 | | County-coded |
| | Connecticut | Embossed white numbers on blue plate with border line; "CONNECTICUT" embossed in white block letters at bottom, offset to left | None | | | |
| | Delaware | Golden yellow registration lettering riveted onto navy base. State name decal attached at top. | | | | |
| | District of Columbia | Embossed dark green numbers on reflective white plate with border line; "DISTRICT OF COLUMBIA" embossed in dark green block letters centered at bottom; "3-31" embossed in top left corner and "63" in top right corner | "NATION'S CAPITAL" embossed in dark green block letters centered at top | AB♦123 | AA♦100 to approximately WV♦999 | |
| | Florida | Embossed white numbers on blue plate with border line; "FLORIDA" embossed in wide white block letters centered at bottom; "19" embossed in top left corner and "63" in top right corner | "SUNSHINE STATE" embossed in narrow white block letters centered at top | 1D-12345; 10D12345; 1-123456; 10-12345; 1W123456; 10W12345; 1WW12345; 10WW1234 | | Coded by county (1 or 10) and weight class |
| | Georgia | Embossed white numbers and border on red base. | | | | |
| | Guam | | | | | |
| | Hawaii | | | | | |
| | Idaho | White lettering and rims embossed on green base. | None | 1A 2 345 | | County-coded |
| | Illinois | Yellow lettering embossed on dark green base; "19 ILLINOIS 63" at top | "Land of Lincoln" embossed at bottom | 123 456; AB 1234 | 1 to 999 999; AA 1000 to approximately RD 6000 | Issued in the colors of Moline-based Deere & Company, in honor of its 125th anniversary. |
| | Indiana | Golden yellow lettering embossed on medium blue base | None | 12A3456 | | Coded by county (12) and DMV office (A) of issuance |
| | Iowa | | | | | |
| | Kansas | Embossed green numbers on white plate with state-shaped border; "KANSAS 63" embossed in green block letters centered at top | None | A/B-12345 | Coded by county (A/B) | |
| | Kentucky | Embossed white numbers on dark blue plate with border line; "KENTUCKY" and county name embossed in wide white block letters centered at top and bottom respectively; "19" embossed in top left corner and "63" in top right corner | None | 123-456; A12-345 | | Issued in blocks by county |
| | Louisiana | Embossed white numbers on dark green plate with border line; embossed white pelican in the center; "19 LOUISIANA 63" embossed in wide white block letters at bottom | "SPORTSMEN'S PARADISE" embossed in narrow white block letters at top | 123 456; 1234567 | 1 001 to approximately 1036000 | Last base to feature embossed or decal pelican. |
| | Maine | Embossed black numbers on white plate with border line; "MAINE" embossed in wide black block letters offset to left above numbers; 1962 issues include embossed numbers with slots offset to right | "VACATIONLAND" embossed in narrow black block letters centered below numbers | 123-456 | 1 to 384-000 (1962 issues); 384-001 to 617-000 | Revalidated for 1963 with yellow tabs |
| | Maryland | Embossed white numbers on blue plate with border line; "MARYLAND" and "EXP-3-31-63" embossed in white block letters centered at top and bottom respectively | None | ABC 123 | | |
| | Massachusetts | White lettering and rims embossed on black base; "63 MASS" in embossed white box at top | None | 123·456; A12·345 | | |
| | Michigan | | | | | |
| | Minnesota | | | | | |
| | Mississippi | White with embossed blue lettering and trim. The county name was stamped on the bottom of the license plate. | None | 12-3456; A-12345 | | |
| | Missouri | | | | | |
| | Montana | Embossed black numbers on unpainted aluminum plate with state-shaped border; "MONTANA" embossed in wide black block letters centered below numbers; embossed "63" to right of state name | "TREASURE STATE" embossed in narrow black block letters centered above numbers | 1·12345; 10·1234 | | Coded by county of issuance (1 or 10) |
| | Nebraska | Embossed green lettering and rims on white base; "NEBRASKA" embossed at bottom center | "THE BEEF STATE" embossed at top center | 1-12345; 12-3456 | | County-coded (1 or 12); 1962 base plate renewed with stickers for 1963 |
| | Nevada | Embossed silver numbers on dark blue plate with border line; "NEVADA" embossed in silver block letters centered at top; "JUN 61" embossed in top left corner and state outline in top right corner | None | A12345; AB1234 | | County-coded (A or AB). 1961 base plates revalidated with stickers. |
| | New Hampshire | Embossed forest green numbers on white plate; "NEW HAMPSHIRE" embossed in wide forest green block letters at bottom; "19" embossed in top left corner and "63" in top right corner | "PHOTOSCENIC" embossed in narrow forest green block letters centered at top | AB123 | | County-coded |
| | New Jersey | Black on buff, non-reflective, "N.J." embossed in wide block letters centered at top | "GARDEN STATE" embossed in plain block letters centered at bottom | ABC-123 | AAA-100 to RHZ-999 | Undated plates issued between 1959–69 |
| | New Mexico | | | | | |
| | New York | Embossed black on gold; "NY" embossed in black block letters in bottom left corner and "62" in bottom right corner | "EMPIRE STATE" embossed at bottom center. | A-1234; AB-1234; 1234-A; 1234-AB; 1A-1234 | | County-coded |
| | North Carolina | Black base with embossed yellow lettering and rims. | "DRIVE SAFELY" embossed at bottom | A-1234; AB-1234 | | |
| | North Dakota | Embossed black numbers on yellow plate with border line; "N.DAKOTA" embossed in black block letters in top left corner; "62" embossed in top right corner | "PEACE GARDEN STATE" embossed in black block letters at bottom | 123-456 | 1 to approximately 355-000 | 1962 base plate revalidated for 1963 with yellow stickers |
| | Ohio | White embossed lettering and border on dark blue base. | None | 12345; A·12345; AB·1234; 12345·A; 1234·AB; A·1234·B | | Issued in blocks by county |
| | Oklahoma | Embossed white numbers on black plate with border line; "OKLAHOMA" embossed in white block letters centered above numbers; "19" embossed in top left corner and "63" in top right corner | None | AB-1234 | | County-coded: Two-letter county codes introduced. Letters I and Q not used, except for CI in Cimarron County (and, later, WI in Washington County). Leading zeros used in numbers below 1000. |
| | Oregon | Embossed gold numbers on blue plate with border line; "OREGON" embossed in gold block letters centered at top; month of expiration embossed in top left corner | "PACIFIC WONDERLAND" embossed in gold block letters at bottom | 1A-1234 | | 1960 base plates revalidated for 1963 with stickers. Letter corresponds to month of expiration: letters N through Z (excluding O) were used for January through December respectively. |
| | Pennsylvania | Yellow embossed lettering and infill around state border on blue base | None | 12345; 123-456; A12-345; 123-45A; 1A2-345 | | Keystone logo in center of lettering. Sticker validation through 1964. |
| | Rhode Island | Jet-black lettering embossed on white base | None | AB123 | | Undated base plate renewed with stickers for 1963 |
| | South Carolina | Embossed white numbers on green plate with border line; "SOUTH CAROLINA 63" embossed in white block letters at top | None | A-123456 | | Letter corresponds to weight class |
| | South Dakota | Red embossed lettering and rims on white with stamped Mount Rushmore graphic at top | None | 1-12345; 10-1234 | | |
| | Tennessee | Embossed black numbers on white plate with border line; "TENN" embossed in black block letters centered at top, surrounded by state outline; "62" embossed in top right corner | None | 1-1234; 1A-1234; 1AB-123; 10-1234; 10-A123; 10-AB12 | | 1962 base plates revalidated for 1963 with stickers. County-coded (1 or 12) |
| | Texas | | | | | |
| | Utah | White embossed lettering on dark blue base, "UTAH 63" centered at bottom | None | AB 1234 | | AA 1000 to approximately EH 5000 |
| | Vermont | Embossed white numbers on dark green plate; "VERMONT" embossed in white block letters centered at bottom; "63" embossed in bottom right corner | "SEE" embossed in white block letters to left of state name, giving "SEE VERMONT" | 12345; A1234 | | |
| | Virginia | Embossed black lettering on white base. | None | A123-456 | | |
| | Washington | Embossed green letters and border on white base. | None | ABC 123 | | |
| | West Virginia | Debossed yellow numbers on blue plate with border line; "WEST VIRGINIA" debossed in yellow block letters centered below numbers; "19" debossed in bottom left corner and "63" in bottom right corner | "1863 CENTENNIAL 1963" debossed in yellow block letters above numbers | 123-456 | | 1 to approximately 490-000 |
| | Wisconsin | Embossed blue numbers on white plate; "WIS" embossed in blue block letters in top left corner; month of expiration and "63" embossed in top right corner | "AMERICA'S DAIRYLAND" embossed in blue block letters centered at bottom | A12-345 | | Letter corresponds to month of registration expiration |
| | Wyoming | | | | | |

== Non-passenger plates ==
Non-passenger Plates
| Image (standard) | Region | Type | Design & Slogan | Serial format | Serials issued | Notes |
|---|---|---|---|---|---|---|
| | Michigan | Commercial | White lettering on green background | | | |
| | Maryland | 20 Day Temporary | Black lettering on white background | | | |

== See also ==
- Antique vehicle registration
- Electronic license plate
- Motor vehicle registration
- Vehicle license
