= Vehicle registration plates of the United States for 1967 =

1967 license plates in the United States

Vehicle registration plates of the United States by year
| Vehicle registration plates of the United States for 1966 | Events of 1967 | Vehicle registration plates of the United States for 1968 |

All of the 50 states of the United States of America plus several of its territories and the District of Columbia issued individual passenger license plates for the year 1967.

== Passenger baseplates ==
Passenger car plates
| Image | Region | Design | Slogan | Serial format | Serials issued | Notes |
|---|---|---|---|---|---|---|
| | Alabama | Reflective yellow lettering, logo, and borders embossed on blue base. | "HEART OF DIXIE" embossed under top rim. | 1-23456; 12-34567 | | County-coded registration (1 or 12) |
| | Alaska | Embossed yellow numbers on blue plate with border line; embossed yellow eagle totem pole at left; "ALASKA" embossed in yellow stylized letters centered at top; embossed yellow box in top right corner containing debossed "66" in blue. | "NORTH TO THE FUTURE" embossed in yellow block letters centered at bottom, with "1867" to the left and "1967" to the right. | 12345 | 1 to 99999 | Commemorated the centennial of the Alaska Purchase. 1966 base plates revalidated for 1967 with stickers. |
| | Arizona | | | | | |
| | Arkansas | Embossed blue numbers on reflective white plate with border line; "ARKANSAS 67" embossed in blue block letters centered at top. | "LAND OF OPPORTUNITY" embossed in blue block letters centered at bottom | 1-12345; 10-1234 | | County-coded registration. |
| | California | Embossed golden yellow lettering on black base. State name at top center. | none | ABC 123 | AAA 000 to ZZZ 999 | 1963 base plates revalidated for 1967 with stickers. Under certain conditions can still be valid for use. |
| | Canal Zone | Embossed yellow on black | Funnel For World Commerce | 12345 | | |
| | Colorado | Embossed green lettering and rims on white base; mountains embossed in green at bottom. | none | AB 1234 | | County-coded registration. |
| | Connecticut | Embossed white numbers on blue plate with border line; "CONNECTICUT" embossed in white block letters at bottom, offset to left. | none | AB·1234 | | 1966 base plates (and earlier ones) revalidated for 1967 with stickers. |
| | Delaware | Raised reflective golden yellow lettering attached to navy blue base. "DELAWARE" in golden yellow decal at bottom. | "THE FIRST STATE" on decal attached at top center. | 123456 | | 1962 base revalidated for 1967 with stickers. |
| | District of Columbia | Reflective white base with jet black embossed lettering and rims. | "NATION'S CAPITAL" embossed at bottom center | 12-345 | | |
| | Florida | Embossed white numbers on black plate with border line; "FLORIDA" embossed in wide white block letters centered at bottom; "67" embossed in top left corner and "68" in top right corner | "SUNSHINE STATE" embossed in narrow white block letters centered at top | 1D-12345; 10D12345; 1-123456; 10-123456; 1W123456; 10W12345; 1WW12345; 10WW1234 | | Coded by county (1 or 10) and weight class |
| | Georgia | Embossed red numbers and border on white base. | "Peach State" | 1·12345; 1·A·12345; 10·1234; 10·A·1234; 100·1234; 100·A·123 | | Coded by county of issuance (1, 10 or 100) and weight class |
| | Guam | Embossed blue lettering and rims on white base. "GUAM USA" embossed at bottom center. | "HAFA ADAI" embossed at top center. | 1234 | | 1965 base plates revalidated for 1967 with stickers. |
| | Hawaii | | | | | |
| | Idaho | Embossed white numbers on dark green plate with border line; "IDAHO 67" embossed in wide white block letters centered at top. | "FAMOUS POTATOES" embossed in narrow white block letters centered at bottom. | A 12345 0/A 12345 | | Coded by county of issuance (A or 0/A) |
| | Illinois | Black lettering on reflective white base; "19 ILLINOIS 67" at top. | "Land of Lincoln" | 123 456; AB 1234 | | All-numerical serials: 1 to 999 999; others: AA 1000 to approximately WG 3000. First all-reflective Illinois plate. |
| | Indiana | Red lettering embossed on reflective white base. | none | 0A1234; 00A1234 | | County-coded registration. |
| | Iowa | Embossed black numbers on reflective white plate with border line; "IOWA" embossed in black block letters centered at top; "67" embossed in top right corner. | none | 1-12345; 1/0 123456 | | County-coded registration ((1 or 1/0)) |
| | Kansas | Embossed white numbers on Columbia blue plate with state-shaped border; "KANSAS 67" embossed in white block letters centered at top. | "MIDWAY USA" embossed in white block letters centered at bottom. | A/B-12345 | | County-coded registration (A/B) |
| | Kentucky | Embossed white numbers on dark blue plate with border line; "KENTUCKY" and county name embossed in wide white block letters centered at top and bottom respectively; "19" embossed in top left corner and "67" in top right corner. | none | 123–456; A12-345 | | Issued in blocks by county. |
| | Louisiana | Embossed white numbers on dark green plate with border line; "LOUISIANA" embossed in wide white block letters centered at bottom; "66" embossed in bottom left corner and "67" in bottom right corner. | "SPORTSMAN'S PARADISE" embossed in narrow white block letters at top. | 123A456 | | Letter corresponds to State Police troop area of issue. |
| | Maine | Embossed black numbers on white plate with border line; "MAINE" embossed in wide black block letters offset to left above numbers, with metal tab slots for year to the right of state name. | "VACATIONLAND" embossed in narrow black block letters centered below numbers. | 123–456 | 1 to 384–000 (1962 base issues); 384–001 to 617–000 (1963 base issues) | 1962 base plates with embossed year and 1963 original undated base plates (re)validated for 1967 with black tabs. |
| | Maryland | Embossed golden yellow numbers on black plate with border line; "MARYLAND" and "EXP-3-31-67" embossed in golden yellow block letters centered at bottom and top respectively. | none | AB:1234 | AA:1001 to approximately GZ:9000. | |
| | Massachusetts | Undated blue embossed lettering and rims on reflective white with border line; "MASSACHUSETTS" embossed at top. | none | 123·456 A12·345 | | |
| | Michigan | Maize lettering and rims embossed on dark blue base; "MICH 67" at top | Water-Winter Wonderland embossed at bottom. | AB-1234 | | County-coded. Front and rear plates required. Colors honored University of Michigan during its sesquicentennial year. |
| | Minnesota | Embossed green numbers on reflective white plate with border line; "MINNESOTA" embossed in green block letters centered at bottom; "19" embossed in bottom left corner and "65" in bottom right corner. | "10,000 LAKES" embossed in green block letters centered at top. | 1AB 123; MAB 123 | MAA 100 to approximately MLC 999 (M series only) | 1965 base revalidated for 1967 with orange stickers. Plates beginning with M were mail-order issues. |
| | Mississippi | Black with embossed white lettering and trim. The county name was stamped on the bottom of the license plate. | none | 12-3456 | | Issued in blocks by county. |
| | Missouri | Embossed white lettering on maroon base. "MISSOURI" embossed at top center and month of validation at top left. | none | AB1-234 | | Previous base plates revalidated with green 1967 stickers. |
| | Montana | Embossed yellow numbers on light blue plate with state-shaped border; "MONTANA" embossed in wide yellow block letters centered below numbers; embossed "67" to right of state name. | "BIG SKY COUNTRY" embossed in narrow yellow block letters centered above numbers. | 1·12345; 10·1234 | | County-coded registration. |
| | Nebraska | Red embossed lettering and state-shaped rims on white base. | Centennial | 1-A1234; 1-AB123; 10-A123; 10-AB12 | | County-coded (1 or 10). Commemorated Nebraska's 100 years of statehood. 1966 baseplates revalidated for 1967 with stickers. |
| | Nevada | Blue embossed lettering andvrims on off-white reflective base. | none | A-12345 or AB-12345 | | County-coded (A or AB). 1965 baseplates revalidated with stickers. |
| | New Hampshire | Embossed forest green numbers on white plate with border line; "NEW HAMPSHIRE" embossed in wide forest green block letters at bottom; "19" embossed in top left corner and "67" in top right corner. | "SCENIC" as on 1957 base. | AB123 | | County-coded (AB). |
| | New Jersey | Black on buff, non-reflective, "N.J." embossed in wide block font above numbers. | GARDEN STATE embossed at bottom. | ABC-123 | AAA-100 to RHZ-999 | |
| | New Mexico | Embossed red lettering on sun-yellow base. State name centered at bottom. "65" embossed at bottom left corner. | "LAND OF ENCHANTMENT" embossed at top center. | 1-12345 | | County-coded registration. 1967 stickers renewed 1965 base plate. |
| | New York | Embossed orange lettering on dark blue base; border lines around plate and around registration sticker spot at bottom right; "NEW YORK" embossed in orange block letters centered at bottom. | none | A-1234; AB-1234; 1234-A; 1234-AB; 1A-1234 | | County-coded registration. |
| | North Carolina | Embossed green serial on reflective white plate with border line; "1967" centered at top; "NORTH CAROLINA" at bottom | none | A-1234; AB-1234 | | |
| | North Dakota | Embossed red lettering and border on reflective white base; "N. DAKOTA" at top left; "66" at top right | "PEACE GARDEN STATE" embossed at bottom | 123-456 | | 1966 base plate renewed with stickers |
| | Ohio | Embossed white lettering and rims on blue base. "67 OHIO" embossed at bottom. | none | A 123 B AB 1234; 1234AB | | County-coded registration. |
| | Oklahoma | Embossed orange lettering on reflective white base. | OKLAHOMA IS OK | AB1234 | | County-coded registration (AB). |
| | Oregon | Embossed gold numbers on blue plate; border line around plate and around registration year sticker spot in bottom right corner; "OREGON" embossed in block letters centered at bottom; month of expiration embossed in bottom left corner. | none | ABC 123 | | Coded by month of expiration (A). |
| | Pennsylvania | Blue embossed lettering and state-shaped rims on yellow base. | none | 123–456; A12-345; 123-45A; 1A2-345; 12A-345 | | 1965 base plates revalidated for 1967 with red stickers. |
| | Rhode Island | Embossed black lettering and rims on white base. State name at bottom center. | "DISCOVER" embossed at top center. | AB-123 | | Previously issued base plates revalidated with stickers for 1967. |
| | South Carolina | Embossed black lettering and rims on white base. | none | A123-456 | | |
| | South Dakota | Embossed red lettering and rims on white base. Mount Rushmore decal at top center. | none | 1-23456; 12-3456 | | County-coded registration (1 or 12) |
| | Tennessee | Embossed black lettering and rims on white base. "TENN." embossed at top center with county name on sticker at bottom center. | none | AB-1234 | | County-coded registration. |
| | Texas | Embossed black lettering and star separator on white base. | none | ABC-123 | BBB-10 to approximately RKN-999 | |
| | Utah | White embossed lettering on green base, "UTAH 67" embossed at bottom. | none | AB 1234 | AA 1000 to approximately FD 5000 | |
| | Vermont | Debossed white numbers and letters on green plate with border line; "VERMONT" centered at bottom; white rectangular sticker box debossed at bottom left corner and "67" at bottom right corner. | none | 123456 | 1 to approximately 187000 | Kelly green used instead of forest green as on previous issues. |
| | Virginia | Embossed black numbers on white plate; "1967 VIRGINIA" embossed in black block letters at bottom. | none | 123–456; A123-456 | 1 to 999–999 and A-100 to approximately A700-000 | |
| | Washington | Embossed green numbers on non-reflective white plate with border line; "WASHINGTON" embossed in green block letters centered at bottom. | none | ABC 123 | | County-coded registration. 1965 base plates revalidated for 1967 with stickers. |
| | West Virginia | Debossed yellow numbers on blue plate with border line; "WEST VIRGINIA" debossed in yellow block letters centered below numbers; "19" debossed in bottom left corner and "67" in bottom right corner. | "MOUNTAIN STATE" debossed in yellow block letters centered above numbers. | 123–456 | 1 to approximately 522-000 | |
| | Wisconsin | Embossed white numbers on maroon plate; "WIS" embossed in white block letters in top left corner; month of expiration and "65" embossed in top right corner. | "AMERICA'S DAIRYLAND" embossed in white block letters centered at bottom | A12-345 | | Letter in registration corresponds to month of expiration. 1965 base plates revalidated for 1967 with stickers. |
| | Wyoming | Embossed white numbers and Bucking Horse and Rider on red plate with border line; "WYO 67" embossed in white block letters at top right. | none | 1–1234 1-123A 1-A123 1/0-1234 1/0-123A | | County-coded registration (1 or 1/0) |

== Non-passenger plates ==
Non-passenger plates
| Image | Region | Type | Design and slogan | Serial format | Serials issued | Notes |
|---|---|---|---|---|---|---|
| | Alaska | Motorcycle | Embossed golden yellow serial on blue plate; "ALASKA 1967" at bottom | M/C1234 | M/C 1 to approximately M/C9000 | |
| | Alaska | Heavy truck | Embossed golden yellow serial on blue plate; stylized "ALASKA" at top, "1867 NORTH TO THE FUTURE 1967" at bottom; yellow box with debossed "66" at top right | TK12345 | TK 1 to approximately TK14000 | Issued to private and commercial trucks over 3,800lbs. |
| | Ohio | DUI offender | Embossed crimson serial on golden yellow plate, "OHIO" on top, no slogan | 123456; 1234567 | 1 to present | For DUI offenders with limited driving privileges. Issued since 1967 but is optional that year and requires a DUI offense to buy, as an alternative to the white-on-dark blue plates. |

== See also ==
- Antique vehicle registration
- Electronic license plate
- Motor vehicle registration
- Vehicle license
