= Vehicle registration plates of the United States for 1962 =

1962 license plates in the United States

Vehicle registration plates of the United States by year
| Vehicle registration plates of the United States for 1961 | Events of 1962 | Vehicle registration plates of the United States for 1963 |

Each of the 50 states of the United States of America plus several of its territories and the District of Columbia issued individual passenger license plates for 1962.

== Passenger baseplates ==
Passenger Car Plates
| Image | Region | Design | Slogan | Serial format | Serials issued | Notes |
|---|---|---|---|---|---|---|
| | Alabama | | | | | |
| | Alaska | | | | | |
| | American Samoa | | | | | |
| | Arizona | | | | | |
| | Arkansas | | | | | |
| | California | | | | | |
| | Canal Zone | | | | | |
| | Colorado | | | | | |
| | Connecticut | | | | | |
| | Delaware | | | | | |
| | District of Columbia | | | | | |
| | Florida | | | | | |
| | Georgia | | | | | |
| | Guam | | | | | |
| | Hawaii | | | | | |
| | Idaho | | | | | |
| | Illinois | | | | | |
| | Indiana | | | | | |
| | Iowa | | | | | |
| | Kansas | | | | | |
| | Kentucky | | | | | |
| | Louisiana | | | | | |
| | Maine | | | | | |
| | Maryland | | | | | |
| | Massachusetts | | | | | |
| | Michigan | | | | | |
| | Minnesota | | | | | |
| | Mississippi | | | | | |
| | Missouri | | | | | |
| | Montana | | | | | |
| | Nebraska | | | | | |
| | Nevada | | | | | |
| | New Hampshire | | | | | |
| | New Jersey | | | | | |
| | New Mexico | | | | | |
| | New York | | | | | |
| | North Carolina | Embossed black serial on golden yellow plate with border line; "62 NORTH CAROLINA" at bottom | "DRIVE SAFELY" centered at top | A-1234; AB-1234 | | |
| | North Dakota | | | | | |
| | Northern Mariana; Islands | | | | | |
| | Ohio | | | | | |
| | Oklahoma | | | | | |
| | Oregon | | | | | |
| | Pennsylvania | Yellow on blue with small keystone separator and state-shaped border | none | | | Validation sticker on 1958 base plate. |
| | Puerto Rico | | | | | |
| | Rhode Island | | | | | |
| | South Carolina | | | | | |
| | South Dakota | | | | | |
| | Tennessee | | | | | |
| | Texas | | | | | |
| | Utah | | | | | |
| | Vermont | | | | | |
| | Virginia | | | | | |
| | Washington | | | | | |
| | West Virginia | | | | | |
| | Wisconsin | Embossed black serial on light yellow plate; "WIS" at top left, month of expiration and "61" at top right. | "AMERICA'S DAIRYLAND" embossed at bottom | A12-345 | Coded by month of expiration | First use of stickers in Wisconsin license plates. |
| | Wyoming | | | | | |

== Non-passenger plates ==
Non-passenger Plates
| Image (standard) | Region | Type | Design & Slogan | Serial format | Serials issued | Notes |

== See also ==
- Antique vehicle registration
- Electronic license plate
- Motor vehicle registration
- Vehicle license
