= We Don't Coast =

Cultural movement in Nebraska, USA

We Don't Coast is a cultural movement and slogan adopted by Omaha and surrounding communities to observe unity, elevate hard work and acknowledge the region's Midwestern, noncoastal status.

“We Don’t Coast” is also the title of an annual Omaha-area print publication featuring artists, entrepreneurs, entertainers and others.

Additional lifestyle slogans illustrating a geographic area include Keep Portland Weird, Keep Austin Weird, Pure Michigan and Keep Indy Indie, among others.

== History ==
In early 2014, the Greater Omaha Chamber convened a variety of task forces that began exploring the region's identity. The task forces encompassed more than 30 communities and a coalition of grassroots volunteers. Their work resulted in the slogan, “We Don’t Coast.” The full unveiling of the campaign occurred in early August 2014.

== Reception ==
The Omaha World-Herald predicted that the punch line, due to its perceived "edgy" nature, would turn around Omaha's image.

In July 2014, BH Media Group's The Daily Nonpareil reported on expected regional impact of the slogan in both Omaha and neighboring Council Bluffs, IA.

KETV Newswatch 7 interviewed some residents of Omaha and they were divided on the slogan itself.

In 2015, the Association of Chamber of Commerce Executives (ACCE) recognized We Don't Coast with its annual “Award of Excellence,” and noted that the momentum of its grass roots movement was the root of its current and future success. A year later, We Don't Coast speciality license plates were released.

In 2017, Site Selection Magazine praised the regional identity and slogan of the movement for promoting expansion of distinct digital footprints to the heartland from coastal tech cities like San Francisco and Boston.

In 2018, the Columbus Telegram reported Columbus, Nebraska's process for identifying their regional slogan, “Something Great,” was inspired by Omaha's 2014 efforts to launch a city identity.
