= List of non-passenger and special vehicle registration plates of Maryland =

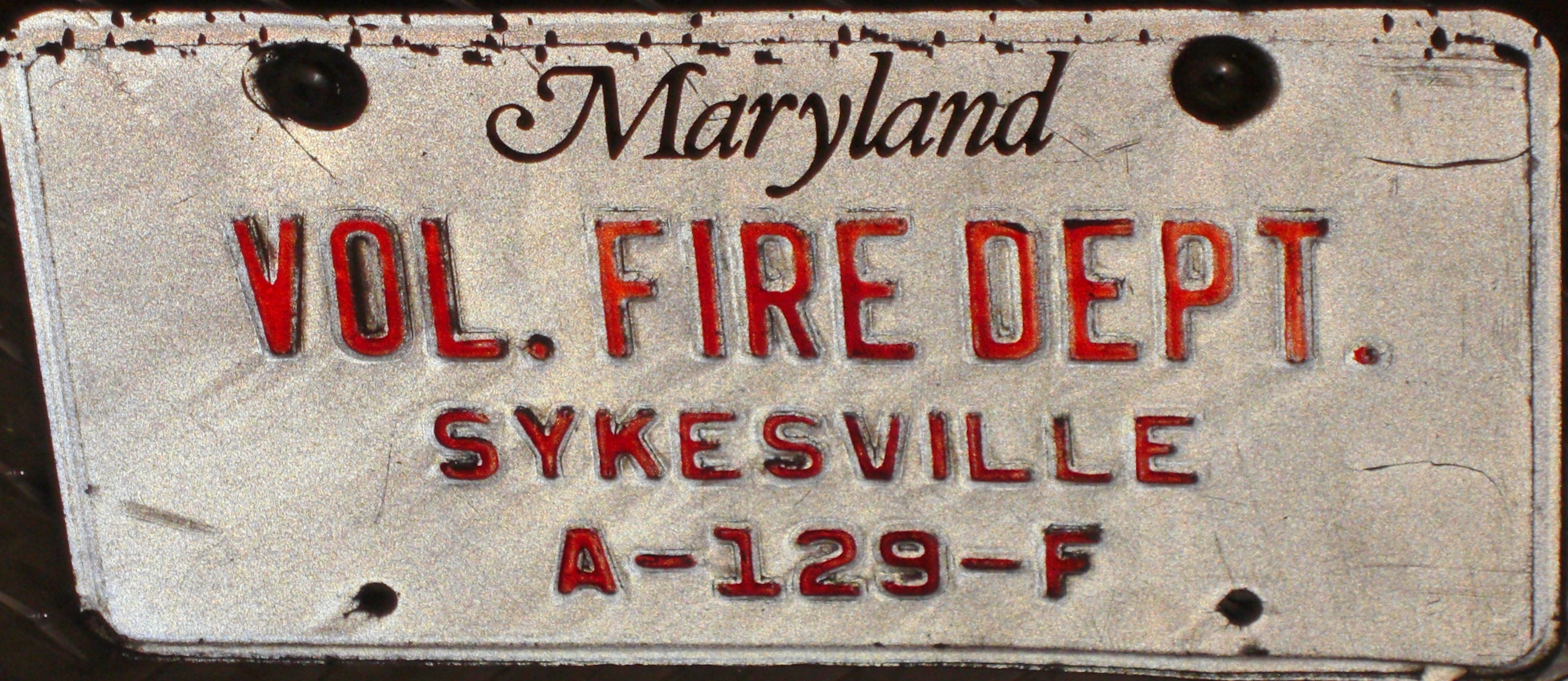
Sykesville volunteer fire department license plate, in use on a fire truck

The U.S. state of Maryland offers a large number of non-passenger and special vehicle registration plates. Each type uses a two-, three-, or four-letter prefix (for cars, multi-purpose vehicles, and light trucks) or suffix (for motorcycles). Organizational plates may be displayed on passenger cars, multi-purpose vehicles, and trucks weighing 10,000 pounds and less, and some types are also available for use on motorcycles. On plates displaying a logo at left, the prefix or suffix is displayed vertically, while on plates that do not display a logo, the prefix is displayed horizontally. Logo plates have a $25 one time fee, while non-logo plates have a $15 one time fee, unless the plate is issued to a vehicle belonging to a member of a volunteer fire department or a Disabled American Veteran.

== A ==
Type	Prefix	Notes
AMVETS Department of Maryland	AV	
ABATE of Maryland, Inc.	MRO	
ABATE of Maryland, Inc. – motorcycle	MRO suffix	
Accokeek Volunteer Fire Department, Inc.	AK	
Air Conditioning Contractors of America	AIR	
Air Force 459th Airlift Wing	AF	
Air Force Association	AFA	Non-logo
Alexandria Firefighters, Inc.	ALX	
Ali Ghan Temple	AG	
All American Chapter Harley Owners Group	HOG	
All American Chapter Harley Owners Group – motorcycle	HO suffix	
Allegany Community College	CC	
Allegany High School Alumni Association	AC	
Allen A. M. E. Church, Baltimore	AM	
Allen Volunteer Fire Company	AVF	
Almas Temple A.A.O.N.M.S.	AT	
Alpha Kappa Alpha	AKA	
Alpha Phi Alpha	AX	
Amalgamated Transit Union Local 1300	ATU	
Amalgamated Transit Union Local 689	LTU	
American Cancer Society	RFL	
American Federation of State, County and Municipal Employees, AFL–CIO	AU	
American Indian Society of Washington, D.C.	AIS	
American Legion Auxiliary Department of Maryland, Inc.	ALA	
American Legion Riders	ALR	
American Legion Riders (motorcycle)	ALR suffix	
American Massage therapy Association Maryland Chapter	AMT	
American Red Cross	ARC	
American Sewing Guild	ASG	
American University	AUE	
American Whitewater Affiliation	AW	
Ancient and Accepted Scottish Rite of Freemasonary	SR	
Ancient Order of Hibernians in America, Inc.	AO	
Annapolis Professional Firefighters Local 1926	AFD	
Annapolis Triathlon Club	ATC	
Annapolis Woodworkers Guild	AWG	
Annapolis Yacht Club	AYC	
Annapolis, Maryland Chapter Harley Owners Group	AH	
Annapolis, Maryland Chapter Harley Owners Group – motorcycle	AH suffix	
Anne Arundel Alarmers Association	AAA	
Anne Arundel County Professional Firefighters Local 1563	AP	
Anne Arundel County Professional Fire Fighters Local 1563 – motorcycle	AP suffix	
Anne Arundel County Retired Fire Fighters Association	RFF	
Antietam Fire Company	AFC	
Arcadia Volunteer Fire Company, Inc.	AV	
Archdiocesan Holy Name Union	HN	
Archeological Society of Maryland, Inc.	AS	
Arizona State University Alumni Association	AZ	
Armenian Association of Greater Baltimore	AAB	
Army Reserve	ARO	Non-logo
Arundel Volunteer Fire Department, Inc.	VS	
Auctioneers Association of Maryland	BID	Autism Speaks
Aussie Rescue and Placement Helpline, Inc.	RSQ	

== B ==
Type	Prefix	Notes
B & O Railroad Museum	BO	
Baltimore 4 Wheelers, Inc.	BW	
Baltimore American Indian Center, Inc.	AI	
Baltimore Area Alumni Association, Inc. of Alpha Phi Omega fraternity	MS	
Baltimore Bicycling Club, Inc.	BBC	Non-logo
Baltimore Blues Society	BBS	
Baltimore City College Alumni Association, Inc.	BCC	
Baltimore City Community College	BCO	Non-logo
Baltimore City Fire Department	BFS	
Baltimore City Fire Fighters Local No. 734	FL	
Baltimore City Fire Fighters Local No. 734 – motorcycle	FL suffix	
Baltimore City Fire Officers – motorcycle	FO suffix	
Baltimore County Fire Department Chief Officers Association, Inc.	FX	
Baltimore County Fire Fighters Association Local No. 1311	CF	
Baltimore County Fire Fighters Association Local No. 1311 – motorcycle	CF suffix	
Baltimore County Retired Fire Officers and Fire Fighters	RS	
Baltimore Duckpin Bowlers Association	BD	
Baltimore Fire Officers Association	FO	
Baltimore Kickers, Inc.	KX	
Baltimore Metro Chapter of the Harley Owners Group, Inc.	HD	
Baltimore Metro Chapter of the Harley Owners Group, Inc. – motorcycle	HD suffix	
Baltimore Polytechnic Institute Alumni Association	BPI	
Baltimore Professional Duckpin Association	BPD	Non-logo
Baltimore Retired Police Benevolent Association	BRP	
Baltimore Ski Club, Inc.	SKI	
Baltimore Streetcar Museum, Inc.	BSM	
Baltimore Symphony Associates	BSO	
Baltimore Teachers Union	BTU	
Baltimore Tuskegee Alumni Association	TU	
Baltimore Washington Conference of United Methodist Men	BWC	
Baltimore Yacht Club	BYC	
Bay District Volunteer Fire Department	BD	
Bel Air Corvette Club	BAC	
Bel Air Volunteer Fire Company, Inc.	VFC	
Bel Alton Volunteer Fire Department, Inc.	BA	
Benedict Volunteer Fire Department & Rescue Squad, Inc.	BFR	
Berlin Fire Company, Inc.	BF	
Berwyn Heights Volunteer Fire Department and Rescue Squad, Inc.	TS	
Birds of Prey the Chamber of Baltimore Ravens Nest, Inc.	BOP	
Bishop Episcopal Diocese of Easton	EC	
Bishop Walsh School	BWS	
Bishopville Volunteer Fire Department, Inc.	BV	
Bladensburg Volunteer Fire Department and Rescue Squad, Inc.	BFD	
Blue Knights International Law Enforcement Motorcycle Club, Inc.	BK	
Blue Knights International Law Enforcement Motorcycle Club, Inc. – motorcycle	BK suffix	
Blue Star Mothers	MBS	
BMW Bikers of Metropolitan Washington	BMR suffix	
BMW (Car) Owners' Club	BMW	
Boonsboro Athletic Boosters, Inc.	BHS	
Boumi Temple A.A.O.N.M.S.	BB	
Bowie State University Alumni	BSU	
Bowie Volunteer Fire and Rescue, Inc.	RF	
Box 414 Association, Inc.	BX	
Boy Scouts of America	BSA	
Boys' Latin School of Maryland, Inc.	BL	
Brandywine Volunteer Fire Department	BVF	
Bread of Life Tabernacle	BOL	
Brunswick Volunteer Ambulance & Rescue, Inc.	BVA	
Bryans Road Volunteer Fire Department and Rescue Squad	BR	
Bryn Mawr School	BMS	
Building Industries Foundation	HBA	
Burtonsville Volunteer Fire Department, Inc.	BM	
Bush River Yacht Club	BRY	

== C ==
Type	Prefix	Notes
Cal Ripken, Sr. Foundation	HOF	
Calvary Chapel Church of God	COG	
Calvert Advance Life Support	PM	
Calvert Hall College Alumni Association	CH	
Calvert Marine Museum Society, Inc.	CMM	
Carolina Alumni Association University of South Carolina	USC	
Caroline County Life Support Services, Inc.	ES	
Carroll Christian Schools	CCS	
Carroll County Public Schools	QS	
Carroll Hospital Center	CHC	
Carroll Manor Fire Company, Inc.	CMF	
Carver Alumni Association	CT	
Catholic Daughters of the Americas	CDA	Non-logo
Catholic University of America	CUA	Non-logo
Catonsville High Alumni Association	CS	
Cecil County Des	EM	
Charles County Dive Rescue	DR	
Charles County Mobil Intensive Care Unit	MI	
Charles County Volunteer Rescue Squad, Inc.	LR	
Chesapeake Bay Power Boat Association	CPB	
Chesapeake Heritage Conservancy	SML	
Chesapeake Yacht Club, Inc.	CY	
Chief Petty Officers Association	CPO	
Choose Life of Maryland, Inc.	CLM	
Church Creek Volunteer Fire Company, Inc.	CK	
Church of God Delmarva - DC	JC	
City Union of Baltimore	CUB	Non-logo
Civil Air Patrol MD Wing	CAP	Non-logo
Clemson Alumni Association	TGR	
Clinton Volunteer Fire Department, Inc.	CL	
Cobb Island Volunteer Fire Department and EMS, Inc.	CI	
Colonel Zadok A. Magruder High School	COL	
College of Notre Dame of Maryland	CND	Non-logo
Columbia Ski Club	CO	
Combat Infantry	CIB	
Commissioned Officers Association of the U.S. Public Health Service	PHS	Non-logo
Communication Workers of America	CWA	
Community Fire Company of Millington	MFC	
Community Fire Company of Rising Sun Inc.	RM	
Community Mediation Maryland	CMC	
Community Volunteer Fire Department Bowleys Quarters and Vicinity, Inc.	BQ	
Concerns of Police Survivors	CPS	
Coppin State Alumni Association	CSU	
Cordova Volunteer Firemen's Association, Inc.	TA	
Corinthian Yacht Club	CYC	
Cornell Club of Maryland	CU	
Corvette Club of America	CCA	
Corvette Club of Annapolis	VA	
Council of Baltimore Ravens	RR	
Country Pride Dancers	CWD	Non-logo
Crabtowne Skiers, Inc.	CSI	
Cresaptown Volunteer Fire Department	CFR	
Crescent Yacht Club	CRE	
CSX Employees Service Club of Baltimore	CSX	Non-logo
Cure Autism Now	CAN	

== D ==
Type	Prefix	Notes
David Taylor Model Basin	DT	Non-logo
Davis & Elkins College	DE	
Deacons Conference of Baltimore and Vicinity, Inc.	DCA	
Deep Creek Volunteer Fire Company, Inc.	GC	
Delmar Fire Department	DFD	
Delta Sigma Theta sorority	DST	
DeMatha Catholic High School	DM	
Dentsville Volunteer EMS & Auxiliary Inc.	DVE	
Department of Maryland American Ex-Prisoners of War, Inc.	POW	
DFC Jason C. Schwenz Foundation, Inc.	JCS	
Disabled American Veterans	DAV	Non-logo
Disabled American Veterans Auxiliary	DVA	
District of Columbia Air National Guard	DCG	
Down-N-Dirty Motorcycle Club – motorcycle	DND suffix	
Drexel University Alumni	DU	Non-logo
Dundalk Power Squadron	DS	
Dundalk Renaissance Corporation	DUN	
Duquesne University Alumni Association	DU	

== G ==
Type	Prefix	Notes
Glen Echo Volunteer Fire Department	GE	

== M ==
Type	Prefix	Notes
Maryland Geocaching Society	MGS	
Mechanicsville Volunteer Rescue Squad	MRS	

== N ==
Type	Prefix	Notes
Notre Dame Alumni Association	ND	

== P ==
Type	Prefix	Notes
Penn State Alumni Association	PSU	Non-logo
Prince George's County Tricentennial	PG	
Port of Baltimore	PORT	

== S ==
Type	Prefix	Notes
Seneca Valley High School	WIN	
