= Pure Michigan =

Tourism marketing campaign for the U.S. state of Michigan

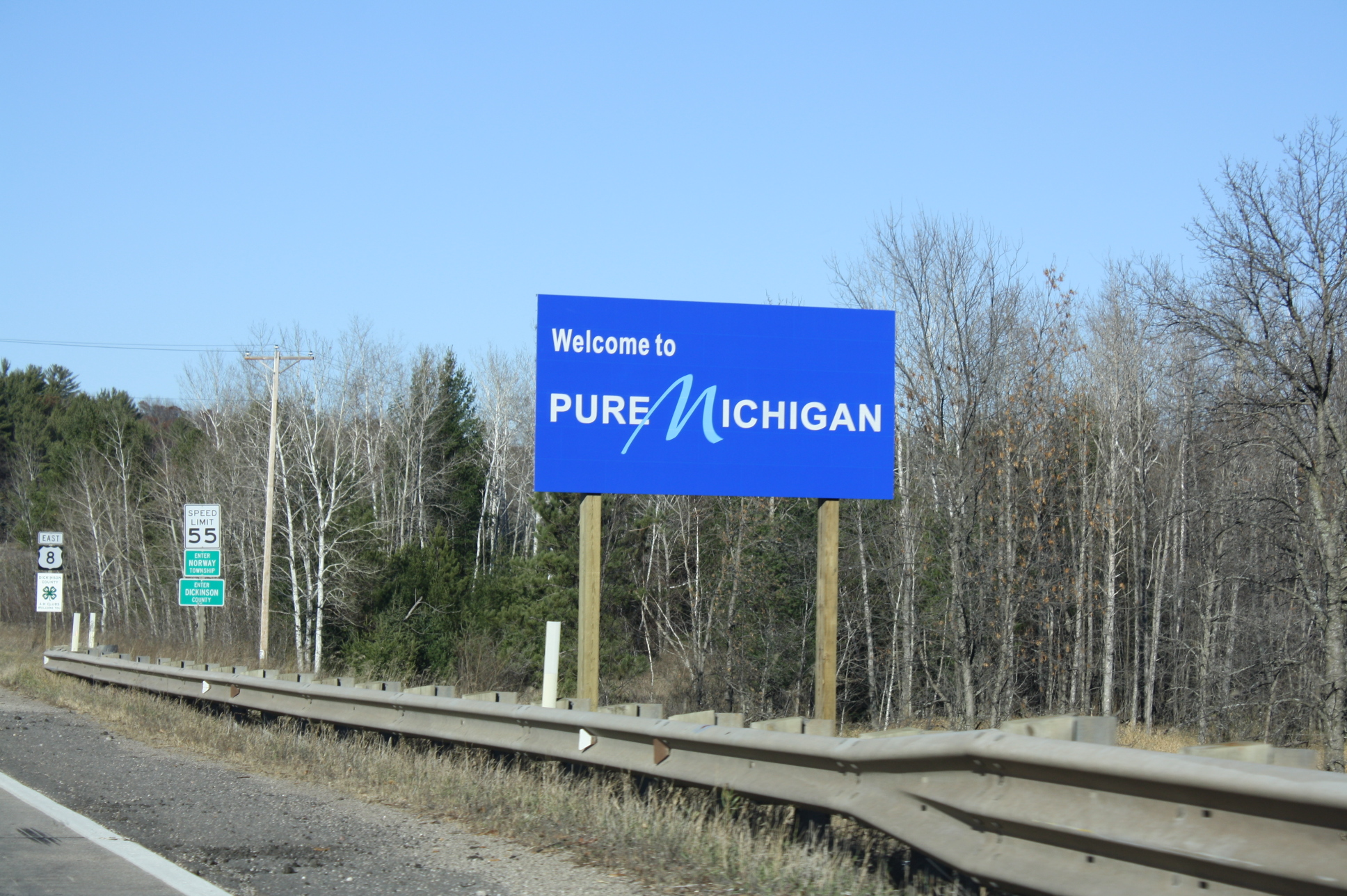
"Pure Michigan" state welcome sign

Pure Michigan is an advertising campaign by the State of Michigan to market itself as a travel and tourism destination. It was launched in 2006 featuring the voice of actor and comedian Tim Allen, using the title song from The Cider House Rules as the background music in television commercials.

The Pure Michigan campaign received state and international attention beginning in 2008 when Michigan Governor Jennifer Granholm approved $45 million in additional funding for the Pure Michigan campaign from the 21st Century Jobs Trust Fund. The unprecedented tourism fund amount for the state allowed the Pure Michigan campaign to be broadcast on a national level beginning in March 2009. Annual funding for fiscal 2014 was $29 million.

Pure Michigan also refers to the brand created by Travel Michigan and embodied by the organization's website. The site was relaunched in March 2008 to support the Pure Michigan brand. Travel Michigan is itself a division of the Michigan Economic Development Corporation, a state-funded economic development corporation founded in 1999 to support the economic development of Michigan. Campaign commercials and radio announcements depict Michigan as adventurous and rustic.

In August 2012, Secretary of State Ruth Johnson unveiled new license plates using the Pure Michigan logo. These plates were released to the public in April 2013. The logo is also used on retail projects sold in the state. At the end of 2014, legislation signed by Governor Rick Snyder extended the branding to the state's heritage route program, renaming them Pure Michigan Byways.

In the late 2010s, following the election of Governor Gretchen Whitmer, the brand was threatened with discontinuation, but has been revived as of 2022 with new commercials and both the standard and Mackinac Bridge license plates continue to use the branding a decade after their introduction.
