= Vehicle registration plates of Maryland =

Maryland vehicle license plates

Maryland
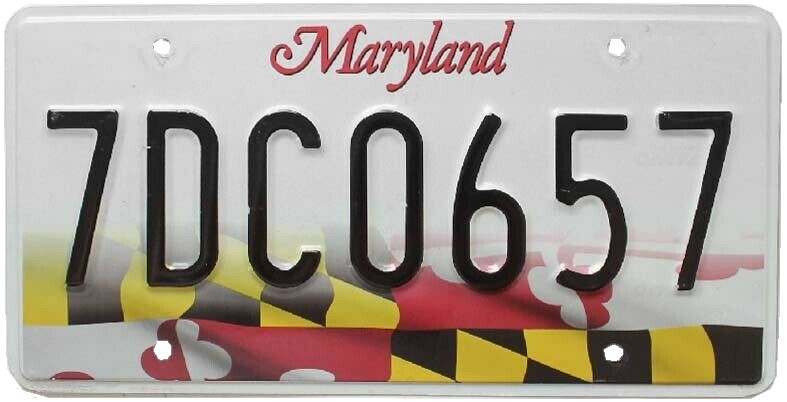

Current series
- Name: Maryland Proud
- Size: 12 in × 6 in 30 cm × 15 cm
- Serial format: 1AB2345
- Introduced: September 26, 2016

Availability
- Issued by: Maryland Department of Transportation, Motor Vehicle Administration

History
- First issued: July 1, 1910 (pre-state plates from 1904 to June 30, 1910)

The U.S. state of Maryland first required its residents to register their motor vehicles in 1904. Registrants provided their own license plates for display until 1910, when the state began to issue plates.

Plates are currently issued by the Motor Vehicle Administration of the Maryland Department of Transportation. Front and rear plates are required for most classes of vehicles, while only rear plates are required for motorcycles and trailers, as well as classes L (historic, 20+ years and unaltered) and N (street rod, 25+ years and altered) that are at least 50 years old.

== Passenger baseplates ==
=== 1910 to 1970 ===
In 1956, the United States, Canada, and Mexico came to an agreement with the American Association of Motor Vehicle Administrators, the Automobile Manufacturers Association and the National Safety Council that standardized the size for license plates for vehicles (except those for motorcycles) at 6 inches (15 cm) in height by 12 inches (30 cm) in width, with standardized mounting holes. The 1956 (expired March 31, 1957) issue was the first Maryland license plate that complied with these standards.

Image	Dates issued	Design	Slogan	Serial format	Serials issued	Notes
	1910	Embossed black serial on yellow plate with border line; vertical "MD" and "1910" at right	none	1234	1 to approximately 5000	
	1911	White serial on black porcelain plate; "MD 1911" at right	none	1234	1000 to approximately 8000	
	1912	Dark blue serial on white porcelain plate; "MD 1912" at right	none	12345	1000 to approximately 11000	
	1913	Yellow serial on black porcelain plate; "MD 13" at right	none	12345	2000 to approximately 15000	
	1914	White serial on green porcelain plate; "MD 14" at right	none	12345	2000 to approximately 20500	
	1915	Embossed white serial on blue plate; "MD 15" at right	none	12345	4000 to approximately 32000	
	1916	Embossed yellow serial on black plate; "MD 16" at left	none	12345	8000 to approximately 51000	
	1917	Embossed dark green serial on white plate; "MD·1917" centered at bottom	none	12-345	20-000 to approximately 82-000	
	1918	Embossed white serial on dark gray plate; "MD·1918" centered at top	none	12-345	20-000 to approximately 95-000	
	1919	Embossed black serial on white plate; "MD·1919" centered at bottom	none	123-456	20-000 to approximately 109-000	
	1920	Embossed white serial on red plate; "MD·1920" centered at top	none	123-456	20-000 to approximately 113-000	
	1921	Embossed red serial on white plate with border line; "MD·1921" centered at bottom	none	123-456	30-000 to approximately 138-000	
	1922	Embossed white serial on dark blue plate with border line; "MARYLAND·1922" centered at top	none	123-456	30-000 to approximately 151-000	First use of the full state name.
	1923	Embossed black serial on yellow plate with border line; "MARYLAND·1923" centered at bottom	none	123-456	30-000 to approximately 185-000	
	1924	Embossed orange serial on black plate with border line; "MARYLAND 1924" centered at top	none	123-456	30-000 to approximately 223-000	
	1925	Embossed white serial on green plate with border line; "MARYLAND 1925" centered at bottom	none	123-456	30-000 to approximately 242-000	
	1926	Embossed white serial on black plate with border line; "MARYLAND 1926" centered at top	none	123-456	30-000 to approximately 275-000	
	1927	Embossed black serial on white plate with border line; "MARYLAND 1927" centered at bottom	none	123-456	30-000 to approximately 288-000	
	1928	Embossed white serial on blue plate with border line; "MARYLAND 1928" centered at top	none	123-456	30-000 to approximately 305-000	
	1929	Embossed blue serial on white plate with border line; "MARYLAND 1929" centered at bottom	none	123-456	30-000 to approximately 325-000	
	1930	Embossed white serial on green plate with border line; "MARYLAND 1930" centered at top	none	123-456	30-000 to approximately 342-000	
	1931	Embossed white serial on red plate with border line; "MARYLAND 1931" centered at bottom	none	123-456	30-000 to approximately 386-000	
	1932	Embossed red serial on white plate with border line; "MARYLAND 1932" centered at top	none	123-456	30-000 to approximately 389-000	
	1933	Embossed white serial on blue plate with border line; "MARYLAND 1933" centered at bottom	none	123-456	30-000 to approximately 385-000	
	1934	Embossed yellow serial on black plate with border line; "MARYLAND" centered at top; "1634" at top left and "1934" at top right	"TERCENTENARY" centered at bottom	123-456	30-000 to approximately 374-000	Commemorated the 300th anniversary of the settlement of Maryland.
	1935	Embossed dark blue serial on white plate with border line; "MARYLAND 1935" centered at bottom	none	123-456	30-000 to approximately 381-000	
	1936–37	Embossed white serial on black plate with border line; "MARYLAND 1936" centered at top	none	123-456	30-000 to approximately 396-000	Valid through March 31, 1937.
	1937–38	Embossed black serial on white plate with border line; "MARYLAND 1937" centered at top	none	123-456	30-000 to approximately 409-000	
	1938–39	Embossed white serial on green plate with border line; "MARYLAND EX-3-31-39" at top	none	123-456	30-000 to approximately 508-000	
	1939–40	Embossed green serial on white plate with border line; "MARYLAND EX-3-31-40" at bottom	none	123-456	30-000 to approximately 522-000	
	1940–41	Embossed white serial on dark blue plate with border line; "MARYLAND EX-3-31-41" at top	none	123-456	30-000 to approximately 544-000	
	1941–44	Embossed black serial on silver plate with border line; "MARYLAND" centered at top; "3-31" at top left and "1942" at top right	"DRIVE CAREFULLY" centered at bottom	123-456	30-000 to approximately 654-000	Revalidated through March 31, 1943 with yellow tabs, then through March 31, 1944 with black tabs, due to metal conservation for World War II.
	1944–47	Embossed silver serial on black plate with border line; "MARYLAND" centered at top; "3-31" at top left and "1945" at top right	"DRIVE CAREFULLY" centered at bottom	123-456	30-000 to approximately 688-000	Revalidated through March 31, 1946 with silver tabs, then through March 31, 1947 with yellow tabs.
	1947–51	Embossed black serial on silver plate with border line; "MARYLAND" and "48" centered at top and bottom respectively	none	123-456	30-000 to approximately 795-000	Revalidated through March 31, 1949 with black tabs, then through March 31, 1950 with red tabs, and finally through March 31, 1951 with black tabs.
	1951–53	Embossed silver serial on black plate with border line; "MARYLAND" and "MARCH 52" centered at top and bottom respectively	none	123-456	30-000 to approximately 795-000	Revalidated through March 31, 1953 with white tabs.
	1953–54	Embossed yellow serial on black plate with border line; "MARYLAND" and "54" centered at top and bottom respectively	none	AB-12-34	AA-10-01 to approximately JF-65-00	For each two-letter series, only the letters A through H, and J, were used.
	1954–55	Embossed black serial on golden yellow plate with border line; "MARYLAND" and "55" centered at top and bottom respectively	none	AB♦12♦34		Letter K added to two-letter series.
	1955–56	Embossed red serial on white plate with border line; "MARYLAND" and "56" centered at top and bottom respectively	none	AB:12:34		
	1956–57	Embossed dark green serial on white plate with border line; "MARYLAND" and "EXP-3-31-57" centered at top and bottom respectively	none	AB-12-34		
	1957–58	Embossed white serial on dark green plate with border line; "MARYLAND" and "EXP-3-31-58" centered at top and bottom respectively	none	AB-12-34		Letter L added to two-letter series.
	1958–59	Embossed blue serial on white plate with border line; "MARYLAND" and "EXP-3-31-59" centered at top and bottom respectively	none	AB:12:34		
	1959–60	Embossed white serial on blue plate with border line; "MARYLAND" and "EXP-3-31-60" centered at top and bottom respectively	none	AB♦12♦34		
	1960–61	Embossed black serial on turquoise plate with border line; "MARYLAND" and "EXP-3-31-61" centered at top and bottom respectively	none	AB:12:34		
	1961–62	Embossed blue serial on white plate with border line; "MARYLAND" and "EXP-3-31-62" centered at top and bottom respectively	none	AB-12-34	AA-10-01 to approximately FY-47-00	Letters M through Z (excluding O, Q and U) added to two-letter series. The practice of not using I, O, Q and U in standard passenger serials continues today.
	1962–63	Embossed white serial on blue plate with border line; "MARYLAND" and "EXP-3-31-63" centered at top and bottom respectively	none	AB♦12♦34	AA♦10♦01 to approximately FN♦98♦00	
	1963–64	Embossed blue serial on white plate with border line; "MARYLAND" and "EXP-3-31-64" centered at top and bottom respectively	none	AB:12:34	AA:10:01 to approximately FX:92:00	
	1964–65	Embossed white serial on blue plate with border line; "EXP-3-31-65" and "MARYLAND" centered at top and bottom respectively	none	AB-1234	AA-1001 to approximately GF-1300	
	1965–66	Embossed black serial on golden yellow plate with border line; "EXP-3-31-66" and "MARYLAND" centered at top and bottom respectively	none	AB♦1234	AA♦1001 to approximately GP♦7800	
	1966–67	Embossed golden yellow serial on black plate with border line; "EXP-3-31-67" and "MARYLAND" centered at top and bottom respectively	none	AB:1234	AA:1001 to approximately GZ:9000	
	1967–68	Embossed blue serial on white plate with border line; "EXP-3-31-68" and "MARYLAND" centered at top and bottom respectively	none	AB-1234	AA-1001 to approximately HG-8000	
	1968–69	Embossed white serial on blue plate with border line; "EXP-3-31-69" and "MARYLAND" centered at top and bottom respectively	none	AB♦1234	AA♦1001 to approximately HT♦5900	
	1969–70	Embossed blue serial on white plate with border line; "EXP-3-31-70" and "MARYLAND" centered at top and bottom respectively	none	AB 1234	AA 1001 to approximately JB 9300	

=== 1970 to present ===
Image	Dates issued	Design	Slogan	Serial format	Serials issued	Notes
	April; 1970 – March; 1975	Embossed white serial on blue plate; border line around plate and around sticker spot at bottom right; "MARYLAND" centered at bottom; "71" at bottom left	none	AB 1234	AA 1001 to approximately SC 4300	
	April; 1975 – March; 1980	Embossed red serial on white plate; border line around plate and around sticker spot at top right; "MARYLAND" centered at top	none	ABC 123	AAA 001 to approximately HNB 999	
	April; 1980 – January 1986	Embossed black serial on white plate with border line; "MARYLAND" centered at top	none	ABC 123	AAA 001 to approximately KHN 999	
	February 1986 – September 2004	Embossed black serial on reflective white plate; shield with design of the state flag screened in the center; "Maryland" screened in black centered at top	none	ABC 123	NAA 001 to ZZZ 999, then AAA 001 to MZZ 999 (from mid-1992)	Modification of the optional 350th Anniversary base introduced in 1983 (see below). Two-year renewals started on July 1, 1992.
	September 2004 – February 2005	Embossed black serial on reflective white plate; shield with design of the state flag screened in the center; "Maryland" screened in black centered at top	none	1AB C23	1AA A01 to 9AK Z99	
	February 2005 – November 2006	Embossed black serial on reflective white plate; shield with design of the state flag screened in the center; "Maryland" screened in black centered at top	"www.maryland.gov" screened in black centered at bottom	1AB C23	1AL A01 to 9CM Z99	
	November – December 2006	Embossed black serial on reflective white plate; shield with design of the state flag screened in the center; "Maryland" screened in black centered at top	"www.maryland.gov" screened in black centered at bottom	1AB C23	1CN A01 to 9CN Z99	Manufactured in New Jersey using that state's serial dies, while the plate production facility at the Maryland State Prison was closed for three weeks due to inmate unrest.
	December 2006 – June 13, 2010	Embossed black serial on reflective white plate; shield with design of the state flag screened in the center; "Maryland" screened in black centered at top	"www.maryland.gov" screened in black centered at bottom	1AB C23	1CP A01 to approximately 4GD J47	Identical to 2005–06 plates.
	June 14, 2010 – September 25, 2016	War of 1812 200th anniversary commemorative design with U.S. flag and Fort McHenry silhouette. Blue on reflective white. State name in blue (with capital-letter sized, but lower-case shaped, "Y"). "War of 1812" text under state name in red. Was to be issued until 2015, but was extended. Commemorates both the Bicentennial, and the anniversary of the writing of the United States' national anthem by Francis Scott Key.	www.starspangled200.org	1A/B2345	1M/D0000 to 9M/D9999; 1A/A0000 to approximately 7C/N9999	During the period when the plate was issued, the web address "www.starspangled200.org" belonged to a non-profit commemorating the War of 1812 bicentennial. Afterwards, the address was briefly owned by a gambling site in the Philippines but was reclaimed by the state government and now redirects to the Maryland Motor Vehicle Administration. Serials issued on passenger vehicles, trucks and multi-purpose vehicles (SUVs and minivans).
	September 26, 2016 – present	Embossed black serial on reflective white plate with state flag screened in bottom half; "Maryland" screened in red centered at top	none	1AB2345	8CN0000 to 2HE5178 (as of September 2, 2026)	The letters I, O, Q, and U are not used, except for special-issue plates. The FN, FS–FZ, GE, GF, and GZ series were skipped.

== Optional plates ==
Image	Dates issued	Design	Slogan	Serial format	Serials issued	Notes
	December 1975 – February 1977	Embossed blue serial on reflective white plate; blue graphic screened at top left featuring the Fort McHenry cannons; "MARYLAND" screened in red centered at bottom; "1776" and "1976" screened in blue on either side of state name	"BICENTENNIAL" screened in blue centered at top, with a red star on either side	123 ABC	001 AAA to approximately 999 AFH	Manufactured by Polyvend Inc. of Arkansas. Last issued February 1977, but remained valid through March 31, 1980.
	August 1983 – February 1986	Embossed black serial on reflective white plate; shield with design of the state flag screened in the center; "Maryland" screened in black centered at top; "1634" and "1984" screened on either side of state name	"350th Anniversary" screened in black centered at bottom	123 ABC	001 AAA to approximately 999 AKE	Commemorated the 350th anniversary of the settlement of Maryland. Awarded "Plate of the Year" for best new license plate of 1984 by the Automobile License Plate Collectors Association, the first time Maryland was so honored. Adopted as standard passenger base from 1986 to 2010 (see above).
	December 1990 – January 2004	Embossed dark green serial on reflective white plate; blue heron graphic screened in the center and dark green reed graphics at bottom corners; "Maryland" screened in blue centered at top	"Treasure the Chesapeake" screened in blue centered at bottom	123 ABC (passenger)	001 BAY to 999 BAY; 001 AAA to 899 BNN	
	December 1990 – January 2004	Embossed dark green serial on reflective white plate; blue heron graphic screened in the center and dark green reed graphics at bottom corners; "Maryland" screened in blue centered at top	"Treasure the Chesapeake" screened in blue centered at bottom	ABC 12D (multi-purpose vehicle)	BAY 01A to BAY 99Z; AAA 01A to AEY 99W	
	January 2004 – October 28, 2018	Embossed black serial on reflective graphic plate featuring gradient blue sky, white sea, a heron and reeds at left, and a Chesapeake blue crab on sand at bottom right; "MARYLAND" screened in white centered at top	"Treasure the Chesapeake" screened in blue centered at bottom	12345C/A; 12345B/Y; 1234D/A ♿	00001C/B to 99999C/B; 00001B/Y to 99999B/Y; 00001C/A to 99999C/A; 00001C/C to approximately 50000C/H	Same serial formats used for passenger and multi-purpose vehicles.
	October 29, 2018 – present	Embossed black serial on reflective graphic plate featuring cloudy blue sky, blue sea, seabed, the Chesapeake Bay Bridge and a Chesapeake blue crab at left and seagrass at bottom right; "MARYLAND" screened in black centered at top	"Protect the Chesapeake" screened in white centered at bottom (50001 C/H to 31999 C/M) "Protect the Chesapeake & Coastal Bays" screened in white centered at bottom (32000 C/M)	12345C/A	50001C/H to 50802C/N (as of September 2, 2026)	Awarded "Plate of the Year" for best new license plate of 2018 by the Automobile License Plate Collectors Association, the second time Maryland was so honored. Same serial formats used for passenger and multi-purpose vehicles.
	July 2001 – present	Embossed black serial on reflective graphic plate featuring orange and yellow gradient sky, green and white rolling hills, and a red farmhouse with a white silo and a green tree; "Maryland" screened in yellow centered at top	"Our Farms, Our Future" screened in yellow at bottom right	A123456	A000001 to A448155 (as of September 2, 2026)	Issued in celebration of Maryland's agricultural heritage. Same serial format used for passenger and multi-purpose vehicles.
	January 1, 2014 – present	Embossed black serial on yellow plate with border line; "MARYLAND" screened in black centered at top	"1910 VINTAGE" screened in black centered at bottom	VR12345 (passenger car); VG12345 (antique vehicles); VR1234♿ (handicapped)	VR00001 to approximately VR00760	Special reproduction of Maryland's first license plate. Serials VR00300 and up were issued to the general public, while VR00001 to VR00299 were issued by special request.

== Non-passenger plates ==
Multi-purpose vehicles (such as minivans and sport utility vehicles), as well as pickup trucks and cargo vans, have traditionally been issued separate plate types. However, since June 14, 2010, trucks and multi-purpose vehicles have been issued passenger plates with the same serial format, first on the War of 1812 commemorative base and currently on the "Maryland Proud" base.

Image	Type	Dates issued	Design	Slogan	Serial format	Serials issued	Notes
	Motorcycle	1970–75	White on blue with border line; "71 MD." at bottom	none	1234; A123; 123A; AB12; 12345		Issued annually prior to 1970. All plates from 1986 until present are still valid.
	Motorcycle	1975–80	Red on white with border line; "MD." at bottom	none	123456	10000 to approximately 201500	Issued annually prior to 1970. All plates from 1986 until present are still valid.
	Motorcycle	1980–86	Black on white with border line; "MD." at bottom	none	123456	10000 to approximately 214000	Issued annually prior to 1970. All plates from 1986 until present are still valid.
	Motorcycle	1986–89	Black on white; "Maryland" screened at top	none	12345D	00001D to 99999D	Issued annually prior to 1970. All plates from 1986 until present are still valid.
	Motorcycle	1989–97	Black on white; "Maryland" screened at top	none	1234D5	0000D1 to 9999D9	Issued annually prior to 1970. All plates from 1986 until present are still valid.
	Motorcycle	1997–2003	Black on white; "Maryland" screened at top	none	123D45	000D01 to 999D99	Issued annually prior to 1970. All plates from 1986 until present are still valid.
	Motorcycle	2003–05	Black on white; "Maryland" screened at top	none	123M45	000M01 to approximately 740M00	Issued annually prior to 1970. All plates from 1986 until present are still valid.
	Motorcycle	2005–06	Black on white; "Maryland" screened at top	www.maryland.gov	123M45	740M01 to 999M99	Issued annually prior to 1970. All plates from 1986 until present are still valid.
	Motorcycle	2006–09	Black on white; "Maryland" screened at top	www.maryland.gov	1D2345	0D0001 to 9D9999	Issued annually prior to 1970. All plates from 1986 until present are still valid.
	Motorcycle	2009 – June 13, 2010	Black on white; "Maryland" screened at top	www.maryland.gov	D12345	D00001 to approximately D39000	Issued annually prior to 1970. All plates from 1986 until present are still valid.
	Motorcycle	June 14, 2010 – mid 2012	As War of 1812 passenger base	www.StarSpangled200.org	D12345	D39001 to D99999	Issued annually prior to 1970. All plates from 1986 until present are still valid.
	Motorcycle	mid 2012 – September 25, 2016	As War of 1812 passenger base	www.StarSpangled200.org	12345Y	00001Y to approximately 95000Y	Issued annually prior to 1970. All plates from 1986 until present are still valid.
	Motorcycle	September 26 – December 2016	As "Maryland Proud" passenger base	none	12345Y	95001Y to 99999Y	Issued annually prior to 1970. All plates from 1986 until present are still valid.
	Motorcycle	December 2016 – present	As "Maryland Proud" passenger base	none	123Y45	000Y01 to present	Issued annually prior to 1970. All plates from 1986 until present are still valid.
	Multi-purpose	February 1986 – October 1997	Black on white; "Maryland" screened at top	none	123456M	000001M to 999999M	
	Multi-purpose	October 1997 – February 2003	Black on white; "Maryland" screened at top	none	M123456	M000001 to M999999	
	Multi-purpose	February 2003 – February 2005	Black on white; "Maryland" screened at top	none	123M456	000M001 to 479M999	
	Multi-purpose	February 2005 – April; 2007	Black on white; "Maryland" screened at top	www.maryland.gov	123M456	480M000 to 999M999	895M000 through 909M999 were manufactured in New Jersey using that state's serial dies, while the plate production facility at the Maryland State Prison was closed for three weeks due to inmate unrest.
	Multi-purpose	April; 2007 – June 13, 2010	Black on white; "Maryland" screened at top	www.maryland.gov	12345M6	00000M1 to approximately 61999M9	
	Truck	February 1986 – December 1992	As shield passenger base	none	123 456	300 001 to 999 999, then 000 001 to 299 999 (from 1989)	
	Truck	December 1992 – February 2005	As shield passenger base	none	12A 345	00A 001 to 22R 999	
	Truck	February 2005 – June 13, 2010	As shield passenger base	www.maryland.gov	12A 345	23R 000 to approximately 99X 999	

== Government plates ==
Plates issued to local and state government agencies, including police and transit buses operated by a city or county or the state (for City of Baltimore).

Image	Type	First issued	Design	Slogan	Serial format	Serials issued	Notes
	Local government-owned vehicle	1986	Black on reflective white with shield as separator in serial	none	L/G 12345	L/G 00001 to approximately L/G 75000	
	Local government-owned vehicle	2005	Black on reflective white with shield as separator in serial	www.maryland.gov	L/G 12345	L/G 75001 to L/G 99999	
	Local government-owned vehicle	2014	As above, but with shield at left	www.maryland.gov	12345 L/G	00001 L/G to 17397 L/G (as of December 9, 2020)	
	State government-owned vehicle	1986	Black on reflective white with shield as separator in serial	none	S/G 12345	S/G 00001 to approximately S/G 22800	Serials S/G 80000 and up used on State Highway Administration vehicles.
	State government-owned vehicle	2005	Black on reflective white with shield as separator in serial	www.maryland.gov	S/G 12345	S/G 22801 to approximately S/G 30500	Serials S/G 80000 and up used on State Highway Administration vehicles.
	State government-owned vehicle	2014	As above, but with shield at left	www.maryland.gov	12345 S/G	00001 S/G to 07271 S/G (as of December 20, 2020)	Serials S/G 80000 and up used on State Highway Administration vehicles.
	Natural Resources Police		Screen-printed yellow slogan stacked vertically on black background, state name screen-printed and centered at top in yellow, serial screen-printed and stacked in yellow offset right.	NATURAL/RESOURCES/POLICE	1/2/3		
	State Police	1963–1984, 1997–present	Stamped black text on yellow background of galvanized steel with state name stamped centered at top in black; slogan centered in black at top underneath state name with serial stamped centered at bottom in black.	STATE POLICE	A-12		
	State Police	1995–1996	Stamped black text on yellow background of galvanized steel with state name stamped centered at top in black; slogan centered in middle with serial stamped centered at bottom in black.	STATE POLICE	A-12		
	State Police	1989–1995	Printed emblem offset left, with state name printed centered at top, slogan printed centered at bottom, with printed serial in black on white silk-screened steel background.	State Police			
	State Police	1985–1989	Printed emblem offset left, with state name printed centered at top, slogan printed centered at bottom, with printed serial in black on white silk-screened aluminum background.	50th Anniversary			

== Temporary plates ==
Image(s)	Type and/or tenure	Date(s) issued	Design	Information imprinting method
	Temporary, 20-day	1955	Black on white cardboard	Hand-written
	Temporary, 20-day	1959–1963	Black on white cardboard	Hand-written
	Temporary, 30-day	1970–1977	Black on white cardboard	Hand-written
	Temporary, 30-day	1980s	Black on white cardboard	Combination, hand-written and hole-punched
	Temporary, 45-day	1998–2000	Green on white cardboard	Hand-written
	Temporary, 60-day	2002–2003	Blue on white cardboard	Hand-written
	Temporary, 60-day	2006	Blue on white cardboard	Combination, hand-written and machine-printed
	Temporary, 60-day	2011–2013	Black on white paper	Computer-printed
	Temporary, 60-day	2013–present	Black on white paper	Machine-printed

== See also ==
- List of non-passenger and special vehicle registration plates of Maryland
