= Vehicle registration plates of Michigan =

Michigan vehicle license plates

Michigan
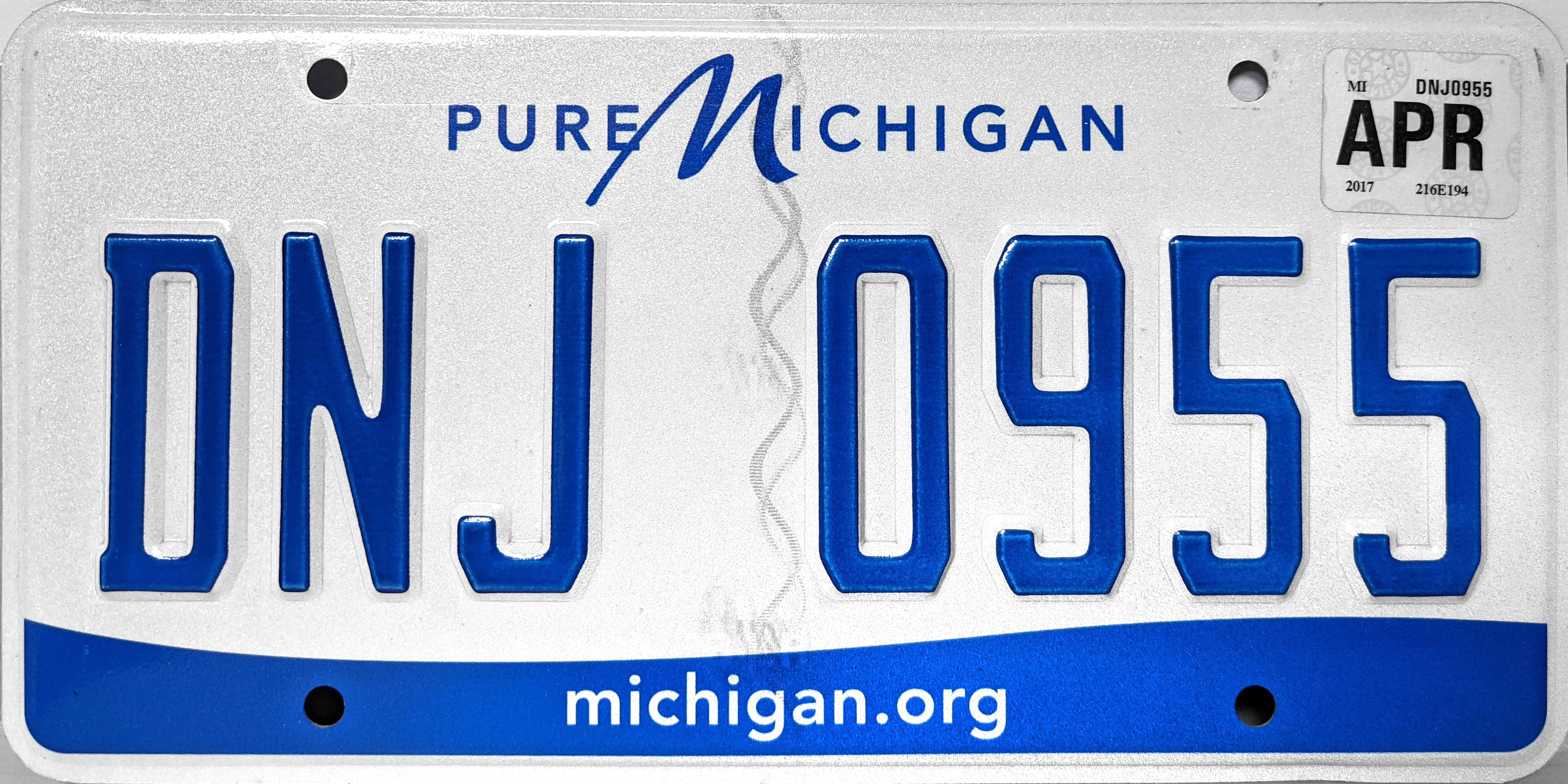

Current series
- Slogan: Pure Michigan
- Size: 12 in × 6 in 30 cm × 15 cm
- Material: Aluminum
- Serial format: ABC 1234
- Introduced: April 2013

Availability
- Issued by: Michigan Department of State

History
- First issued: January 1, 1910 (pre-state plates from 1905 to December 31, 1909)

The U.S. state of Michigan first required its residents to register their motor vehicles in 1905. Registrants provided their own license plates for display until 1910, when the state began to issue plates.

As of 2026, plates are issued by the Michigan Department of State. Only rear plates have been required since 1981. For an extra charge, drivers can request a personalized plate serial as well as a second duplicate plate. Since January 1, 2015, drivers have been required to replace their plates every ten years.

== Passenger baseplates ==
=== 1910 to 1970 ===
In 1956, the United States, Canada, and Mexico came to an agreement with the American Association of Motor Vehicle Administrators, the Automobile Manufacturers Association and the National Safety Council that standardized the size for license plates for vehicles (except those for motorcycles) at 6 inches (15 cm) in height by 12 inches (30 cm) in width, with standardized mounting holes. The 1955 (dated 1956) issue was the first Michigan license plate that complied with these standards.

Image	Dates issued	Design	Slogan	Serial format	Serials issued	Notes
	1910	Black on white porcelain; state seal and "MICH 1910" at left	none	12345	1 to approximately 18500	Front and rear plates issued; this practice continued until 1944.
	1911	White on black porcelain; state seal and "MICH 1911" at left	none	12345	1 to approximately 27500	
	1912	Black on yellow porcelain; state seal and "MICH 1912" at left	none	12345	1 to approximately 40000	
	1913	White on green porcelain; state seal and "MICH 1913" at left	none	12345	1 to approximately 55000	
	1914	Red on white porcelain; state seal and "MICH 1914" at left	none	12345	1 to approximately 77000	
	1915	White on blue; aluminum state seal and "MICH 1915" at left	none	12345	1 to 99999	First embossed plate. Only letters C and E used in the A1234 serial format.
	1915	White on blue; aluminum state seal and "MICH 1915" at left	none	A1234	C0000 to approximately E6000	First embossed plate. Only letters C and E used in the A1234 serial format.
	1916	Blue on white; aluminum state seal and "MICH 1916" at left	none	12345	1 to 99999	
	1916	Blue on white; aluminum state seal and "MICH 1916" at left	none	A1234	A1 to approximately F5000	
	1917	White on black; aluminum state seal and "MICH 1917" at left	none	12345	1 to 99999	
	1917	White on black; aluminum state seal and "MICH 1917" at left	none	A1234	A1 to approximately O9000	
	1918	White on green; aluminum state seal and "MICH 18" at left	none	123456	1 to approximately 245000	
	1919	White on brown; aluminum state seal and "MICH 19" at left	none	12345	1 to 99999	
	1919	White on brown; aluminum state seal and "MICH 19" at left	none	A1234	A1 to approximately Z9000	
	1920	Black on orange; stylized "MICH 20" at left	none	123-456	1 to approximately 414-000	
	1921	White on black; stylized "MICH 21" at left	none	123-456	1 to approximately 476-000	
	1922	White on red; stylized "MICH 22" at left	none	123-456	1 to approximately 577-000	
	1923	White on green; stylized "MICH 23" at left	none	123-456	1 to approximately 730-000	
	1924	Black on yellow; stylized "MICH 24" at left	none	123-456	1 to approximately 879-000	
	1925	Black on gray; stylized "MICH 25" at left	none	123-456	1 to approximately 996-000	
	1926	White on black; "MICH 26" at left	none	123-456	1 to 999-999	On both these bases, plates with the M̅123-456 serial format had the 'M̅' surrounded by a diamond, and are thus informally known as "Diamond M" plates.
	1926	White on black; "MICH 26" at left	none	M̅123-456	M̅1 to approximately M̅133-000	On both these bases, plates with the M̅123-456 serial format had the 'M̅' surrounded by a diamond, and are thus informally known as "Diamond M" plates.
	1927	Black on yellow; "MICHIGAN 1927" at bottom	none	123-456	1 to 999-999	On both these bases, plates with the M̅123-456 serial format had the 'M̅' surrounded by a diamond, and are thus informally known as "Diamond M" plates.
	1927	Black on yellow; "MICHIGAN 1927" at bottom	none	M̅123-456	M̅1 to approximately M̅226-000	On both these bases, plates with the M̅123-456 serial format had the 'M̅' surrounded by a diamond, and are thus informally known as "Diamond M" plates.
	1928	White on green; "MICHIGAN 1928" at top	none	1-234-567	1 to approximately 1-116-000	
	1929	Yellow on black; "MICHIGAN 1929" at bottom	none	1-234-567	1 to approximately 1-234-000	
	1930	Black on yellow; "MICHIGAN 1930" at bottom	none	1-234-567	1 to approximately 1-248-000	
	1931	Red on black; "MICHIGAN 1931" at bottom	none	1-234-567	1 to approximately 1-223-000	
	1932	White on dark blue; "MICHIGAN 1932" at top	none	1-234-567	1 to approximately 1-139-000	
	1933	Black on white; "MICHIGAN 1933" at bottom	none	12-345; A12-345	Issued in blocks by county	
	1934	Black on yellow; "19 MICHIGAN 34" at top	none	12-345; A 12345	Issued in blocks by county	
	1935	Yellow on dark blue; "19 MICHIGAN 35" at bottom	none	12-345; A 12345	Issued in blocks by county	
	1936	Black on gray; "19 MICHIGAN 36" at top	none	12-345; A 12345	Issued in blocks by county	
	1937	Yellow on dark blue; "1937 MICHIGAN" at bottom	none	12 345; A 12345	Issued in blocks by county	
	1938	Black on light green; "1938 MICHIGAN" or "MICHIGAN 1938" at top	none	A 12345	Issued in blocks by county	
	1938	Black on white; vertical "MICH" at left; "PASS EXP 8-31-38" at top	none	123456	1 to approximately 552000	Half-year plates issued at lower cost to full-year plates, due to the Depression.
	1939	Black on beige; "19 MICH 39" at bottom	none	A 12345; AB 1234	Issued in blocks by county	
	1939	White on dark blue; vertical "MICH" at left; "PASS EXP 8-31-39" at bottom	none	123456	1 to approximately 552000	Half-year plate.
	1940	Black on silver; "MICH 40" at top	none	AB-12-34	County-coded	
	1940	White on black; "MICH EXP. 8-31 40" at top	none	AB-12-34	County-coded	Half-year plate.
	1941	White on maroon; "MICH 41" at top	none	AB-12-34	County-coded	
	1941	Maroon on white; "MICH EXP. 8-31 41" at top	none	AB-12-34	County-coded	Half-year plate.
	1942–43	White on olive green; "MICHIGAN" at top and "42" at bottom	none	AB-12-34	County-coded	Full and half-year plates revalidated for 1943 with metal tabs, due to metal conservation for World War II.
	1942–43	As above, but with "EXP. 8-31-42" at bottom	none	AB-12-34	County-coded	Half-year plate.
	1944	White on maroon; "MICHIGAN" at bottom and "44" at top	none	AB-12-34	County-coded	Only rear plates issued for both full-year and half-year plates. For full-year plates, this practice continued until 1957.
	1944	Maroon on white; "MICHIGAN" at bottom and "EXP. 8-31-44" at top	none	AB-12-34	County-coded	Half-year plate.
	1945	Black on silver; "MICHIGAN" at top and "45" at bottom	none	AB-12-34	County-coded	
	1945	White on black; "MICHIGAN" at top and "EXP. 8-31-45" at bottom	none	AB-12-34	County-coded	Half-year plate.
	1946	White on dark olive green; "MICHIGAN" at bottom and "46" at top	none	AB-12-34	County-coded	
	1946	White on maroon; "MICHIGAN" at bottom and "EXP. 8-31-46" at top	none	AB-12-34	County-coded	Last half-year plate.
	1947	Black on golden yellow; "MICHIGAN" at top and "47" at bottom	none	AB-12-34	County-coded	
	1948	Black on silver; "MICHIGAN" at bottom and "48" at top	none	AB-12-34	County coded	
	1949	White on black; "MICHIGAN" at top and "49" at bottom	none	AB-12-34	County-coded	
	1950	Black on silver; "MICHIGAN" at bottom and "50" at top	none	AB-12-34	County-coded	
	1951	White on black; "MICHIGAN" at top and "51" at bottom	none	AB-12-34	County-coded	
	1952	Black on silver; "MICHIGAN" at bottom and "52" at top	none	AB-12-34	County-coded	
	1953	White on black, "MICHIGAN" at top and "53" at bottom	none	AB-12-34	County-coded	
	1954	Yellow on dark blue; "19 MICHIGAN 54" at top	Water Wonderland	AB-12-34	County-coded	
	1955	White on green; "19 MICHIGAN 55" at top	Water Wonderland	AB-12-34	County-coded	
	1956	Dark green on white; "19 MICHIGAN 56" at top	Water Wonderland	AB-1234	County-coded	First 6" x 12" plate.
	1957	White on red; "19 MICHIGAN 57" at top	Water Wonderland	AB-1234	County-coded	Front and rear plates issued (as from 1910–43); this practice continued until 1981.
	1958	Black on gray; "19 MICHIGAN 58" at top	Water Wonderland	AB-1234	County-coded	
	1959–61	Yellow on green; "19 MICHIGAN 59" at top	Water Wonderland	AB-1234	County-coded	Revalidated for 1960 with yellow tabs, and for 1961 with silver tabs.
	1962–64	Green on white; "19 MICHIGAN 62" at top	Water Wonderland	AB-1234	County-coded	Revalidated for 1963 with green tabs, and for 1964 with olive tabs.
	1965	Yellow on blue; "MICH 65" at top	Water-Winter Wonderland	AB-1234	County-coded	First year using galvanized steel. First year using state school colors: 1965 honored University of Michigan.
	1966	Dark blue on buff; "MICH 66" at top	Water-Winter Wonderland	AB-1234	County-coded	
	1967	Maize on dark blue; "MICH 67" at top	Water-Winter Wonderland	AB-1234	County-coded	Issued in the colors of the University of Michigan, in honor of its sesquicentennial.
	1968	Yellow on green; "19 MICHIGAN 68" at top	Great Lake State	AB-1234	County-coded	
	1969	White on red; "19 MICHIGAN 69" at top	Great Lake State	AB-1234	County-coded	
	1970	White on light gold; "19 MICHIGAN 70" at top	Great Lake State	ABC-123	BBB-000 to approximately NGS-999	Issued in the colors of Oakland University, which became independent from Michigan State University in 1970. Vowels and Q not used in serials; this practice continued until 1983.

==== County coding ====
Michigan used two-letter county codes from 1940 to 1969, after using county coding blocks from 1933 to 1939. The letters I, O and Q were not used in these codes.

County	1942–1943	1955–61	1962–64	1965–69
Wayne	AA-DZ	AA–FZ	AA–FZ	AA–FZ
Oakland	EA-EN	GA–HH	GA–HZ	GA–HZ
Washtenaw	JU-JZ	HJ–HU	NA–NL	NA–NL
Allegan	LY-LZ	HV–HZ	NM–NR	NM–NR
Kent	FA-FK	JA–JZ	JA–JZ	JA–JZ
Genesee	GA-GK	KA–KZ	KA–KZ	KA–KZ
Ingham	HA-HH	LA–LN	LA–LN	LA–LN
Saginaw	HS-HX	LP–LZ	LP–LZ	LP–LZ
Macomb	HJ-HH	MA–MT	MA–MZ	MA–MZ
Shiawassee	LJ-LL	MU–MZ	NS–NV	NS–NV
Kalamazoo	JG-JM	NA–NJ	PA–PL	PA–PL
Calhoun	JA-JF	NK–NT	PM–PW	PM–PW
Ottawa	KS-KV	NU–NZ	RL–RS	RL–RS
Berrien	JN-JT	PA–PJ	RA–RK	RA–RK
St. Clair	KL-KR	PK–PS	RT–RZ	RT–RZ
Tuscola	LS-LT	PT–PW	TL–TN	TL–TN
Barry	NV-NW	PX–PZ	TP–TR	TP–TR
Muskegon	KF-KK	RA–RJ	TA–TK	TA–TK
Bay	KW-KZ	RK–RS	UA–UG	XA–XG
Monroe	LE-LH	RT–RZ	UH–UP	XH–XP
Jackson	KA-KE	SA–SH	SA–SJ	SA–SJ
Ionia	LW-LX	SJ–SM	SK–SM	SK–SM
Van Buren	LU-LV	SN–SS	SN–SS	SN–SS
St. Joseph	LM-LN	ST–SW	ST–SV	ST–SV
Alpena	PC-PD	SX–SZ	SW–SX	SW–SX
Eaton	MN-MP	TA–TD	PX–PZ	PX–PZ
Sanilac	MT-MU	TE–TH	SY–SZ	SY–SZ
Montcalm	MA-MB	TJ–TM	TV–TX	TV–TX
Lapeer	MC-MD	TN–TP	TY–TZ	TY–TZ
Huron	ME-MF	TT–TU	TS–TU	TS–TU
Manistee	PG-PH	TX–TY	NY–NZ	NY–NZ
Gratiot	MG-MH	UA–UB	VE–VG	VE–VG
Hillsdale	MJ-MK	UE–UF	VH–VK	VH–VK
Clinton	NL-NM	UJ–UK	VL–VN	VL–VN
Lenawee	LA-LD	UN–UR	UR–UV	YA–YE
Grand Traverse	NA-NB	UU–UV	UW–UY	XR–XT
Charlevoix	PW-PX	UY	UZ	XZ
Midland	MR-MS	VA–VC	VA–VD	VA–VD
Branch	MV-MW	VF–VG	VP–VS	VP–VS
Livingston	NC-ND	VK–VL	VT–VV	VT–VV
Cass	NJ-NK	VP–VR	NW–NX	NW–NX
Newaygo	NR-NS	VU–VV	VW–VX	VW–VX
Isabella	NN-NP	VX–VZ	VY–VZ	VY–VZ
Mason	PA-PB	WA–WC	WA–WB	WA–WB
Mecosta	PL-PM	WD–WE	WC–WD	WC–WD
Wexford	PE-PF	WF–WG	WE–WF	WE–WF
Oceana	PS-PT	WH	WG	WG
Emmet	PN-PR	WK	WH	WH
Osceola	PU-PV	WM	WJ	WJ
Cheboygan	RA-RB	WP	WK	WK
Clare	PY-PZ	WS	WL	WL
Presque Isle	RC-RD	WU	WM	WM
Arenac	RE-RF	WW	WN	WN
Ogemaw	RG-RH	WY	WP	WP
Gladwin	RL-RM	XA	WR	WR
Iosco	RR-RS	XC	WS	WS
Benzie	RV-RW	XE	WT	WT
Missaukee	SD-SE	XG	WU	WU
Otsego	SH-SJ	XJ	WV	WV
Leelanau	SK-SL	XL	WW	WW
Kalkaska	SM-SN	XN	WX	WX
Roscommon	SU-SV	XR	WY	WY
Alcona	SP-SR	XT	WZ	WZ
Antrim	SA-SC	XU	XA	XU
Lake	SW-SX	XV	XB	XV
Crawford		XW	XC	XW
Montmorency	SY-SZ	XX	XD	XX
Oscoda	TC-TD	XY	XE	XY
Marquette	LP-LR	YA–YC	XF–XJ	UA–UC
Houghton	ME-MF	YE–YH	XK–XL	UD–UE
Delta	MX-MY	YJ–YK	XM–XN	UF–UG
Dickinson	NG-NH	YN–YP	XP–XR	UH–UJ
Iron	PJ-PK	YT–YU	XS–XT	UK
Chippewa	NT-NU	YW–YX	XU–XV	UL–UM
Menominee	NX-NY	ZA–ZB	XW–XX	UN–UP
Gogebic	NE-NF	ZE–ZF	XY–XZ	UR–US
Schoolcraft	RJ-RK	ZJ	YA	UT
Ontonagon	RN-RP	ZL	YB	UU
Alger	RT-RU	ZN	YC	UV
Baraga	RX-RY	ZR	YD	UW
Luce	SF-SG	ZT	YE	UX
Mackinac	SS-ST	ZV	YF	UY
Keweenaw	TE-TF	ZX	YG	UZ

=== 1971 to present ===
Image	Dates issued	Design	Slogan	Serial format	Serials issued	Notes
	1971–72	Embossed reflective (glass-beaded) white serial on maroon plate with border line; "19 MICHIGAN 71" at top.	"GREAT LAKE STATE" centered at bottom	ABC-123	BBB-000 to approximately RMH-999	Plates available by mail for the first time. Revalidated for 1972 with stickers.
	1973–75	Embossed reflective (glass-beaded) white serial on dark blue plate with border line; "19 MICHIGAN 73" at top.	"GREAT LAKE STATE" centered at bottom	ABC-123	BBB-000 to approximately VRM-999	Personalized and disabled plates available for the first time. Some aluminum plates issued. Revalidated for 1974 and 1975 with stickers.
	1976–78	Embossed reflective (glass-beaded) white serial on red and dark blue plate with border line; two embossed flag stripes at bottom and four embossed stars at left; "MICHIGAN" centered at top.	none	ABC123	BBB000 to approximately XSD999	Commemorated the US Bicentennial. All plates issued were aluminum. Awarded "Plate of the Year" for best new license plate of 1976 by the Automobile License Plate Collectors Association, the first time Michigan was so honored. Revalidated for 1977 and 1978 with stickers.
	1979–82	Embossed reflective (glass-beaded) white serial on black plate with border line; "19 MICHIGAN 79" at top.	"GREAT LAKE STATE" centered at bottom	ABC-123	BBB-000 to ZZZ-999	Serials BBB-000 through NVM-999 were issued by county. Front and rear plates issued until April 1, 1981; only rear plates have been issued ever since.
	1982–83	Embossed reflective (glass-beaded) white serial on black plate with border line; "19 MICHIGAN 79" at top.	"GREAT LAKE STATE" centered at bottom	123-ABC	999-ZZZ to approximately 000-ZMD	Serials progressed backwards. Last plate to require both front and rear plates.
	1983–90	Embossed reflective (glass-beaded) white serial on blue plate; "MICHIGAN" centered at top.	"GREAT LAKES" centered at bottom	123 ABC	000 AAA to 999 ZZZ	All variants of this base revalidated with stickers until 2007. Letters I and O not used in serials; this practice continues today.
	1990–2001	Embossed reflective (glass-beaded) white serial on blue plate; "MICHIGAN" centered at top.	"GREAT LAKES" centered at bottom	ABC 123	AAA 000 to UDT 999	
	2001–04	Embossed reflective (glass-beaded) white serial on blue plate; "MICHIGAN" centered at top.	"GREAT LAKES" centered at bottom	ABC 123	UDU 000 to ZZZ 999	Narrow serial dies introduced.
	2004–06	Embossed reflective (glass-beaded) white serial on blue plate; "MICHIGAN" centered at top.	"GREAT LAKES" centered at bottom	ABC1234	AAA0000 to AFP8999	
	2006–07	Embossed reflective (glass-beaded) white serial on blue plate; "MICHIGAN" centered at top.	"GREAT LAKES" centered at bottom	ABC 1234	AFP 9000 to AJX 1999	Narrower serial dies introduced and space added between letters and digits. Last Michigan plate to use glass beads the white coating for reflectivity. All unissued plates scrapped in January 2007.
	January 1, 2007– April; 2013	Embossed blue serial on reflective white plate; blue band screened at top with "MICHIGAN" in white in the center.	"www.Michigan.gov" screened in blue centered at bottom	ABC 1234	BAA 0000 to approximately CPS 0999	First standard baseplate reissue since 1983. Revalidated with stickers until 2023.
	April; 2013–present	Embossed blue serial on reflective white plate; wavy blue band screened at bottom; screened blue Pure Michigan logo centered at top.	"michigan.org" screened in white in center of wavy blue band	ABC 1234	DAA 0000 to ~FCZ 9999 (as of October 2026)	

== Optional plates ==
Image	Slogan	Dates issued	Design	Serial format	Serials issued	Notes
	World's Motor Capital	1996	Blue serial on background featuring the seal of the American Automobile Centennial Commission and a gold silhouette of an antique automobile outlined in red.	ABC 12	AAA 00 to ZZZ 99	Validated with sticker until 2015 expiration. Serials may be transferred to a new design for an additional fee. In modified form, used as the basis for the default 2008-series Michigan license plate.
	World's Motor Capital	1996	Blue serial on background featuring the seal of the American Automobile Centennial Commission and a gold silhouette of an antique automobile outlined in red.	12 ABC	00 AAA to approximately 99 LPZ	Validated with sticker until 2015 expiration. Serials may be transferred to a new design for an additional fee. In modified form, used as the basis for the default 2008-series Michigan license plate.
	Great Lakes Splendor	1997–December 31, 2006	Blue serial on background featuring a sunset and the Mackinac Bridge.	1AB C23	0AA A00 to approximately 0GR A99	Validated with sticker until 2017 expiration. In modified form, used as the basis for the default 2008-series Michigan license plate.
	Spectacular Peninsulas	January 1, 2007 – December 1, 2021	Black serial on background featuring buildings from the skylines of Detroit, Grand Rapids, Lansing, and Flint, the forests of Michigan, all five Great Lakes, and the Mackinac Bridge.	1AB C23	0HA A00 to approximately 9NB L92	Replaced the Great Lakes Splendor plate, using the same serial format. Being replaced on a rolling 10-year replacement cycle.
	The Mackinac Bridge	August 29, 2013–October 12, 2014	Embossed white serial on sunrise scene featuring the Mackinac Bridge, with gradient orange sky and light blue water; screened white rectangle centered at top containing Pure Michigan logo.	ABC 123	AAA 000 to approximately AJG 999	Awarded "Plate of the Year" for best new license plate of 2013 by the Automobile License Plate Collectors Association, the second time Michigan was so honored. Validated with sticker until 2024 expiration
	The Mackinac Bridge	October 13, 2014–present	Embossed black serial on sunrise scene featuring the Mackinac Bridge, with gradient orange and white sky and light blue water; screened Pure Michigan logo centered at top.	ABC 123	AJH 000 to ETA 999 (as of January 2026)	Revision of the original Mackinac Bridge base for better visibility.
	Water-Winter Wonderland	December 2, 2021–present	Embossed yellow serial on dark blue plate; screened yellow Michigan at top.	1ABC23	0NBM00 to 9RBZ99 (as of January 2026)	Reintroduced in 2021 as an homage to the original 1965 Water-Winter Wonderland plate. Continues serial range from Spectacular Peninsulas series, with increment from second character. Renewal tab is placed in the lower right corner.
	Water Wonderland	January 27, 2024–present	Embossed white serial on green plate; screened Pure Michigan logo in white at top.	12ABC3	00AAA0 to 99APM9 (as of January 2026)	Reintroduced in 2024 as an homage to the original 1963 Water Wonderland plate. Serial characters are not reflective.
	Great Lake State	February 1, 2025–present	Embossed white serial on black plate;" GREAT LAKE STATE" centered at bottom.	AB1CDE	AA0AAA to AA9GMZ (as of January 9, 2026)	Reintroduced in 2025 as an homage to the original 1979 plate. Renewal tab is placed in the lower right corner.
	Great Lakes	February 1, 2025–present	Embossed white serial on blue plate; "GREAT LAKES" centered at bottom.	ABC12D	AAA00A to AAB99L (as of January 9, 2026)	Reintroduced in 2025 as an homage to the original 1983 plate. Renewal tab is placed in the lower right corner.
	Semiquincentennial	January 2, 2026 – December 31, 2026	Embossed white serial on red and blue plate; two flag stripes at bottom and four stars above 26 at left; “MICHIGAN” centered at top.	ABC12D	~AAB01T to AAC75D (as of February 2, 2026)	Reintroduced in 2026 as an homage to the original 1976 plate. Renewal tab is placed in the lower right corner. Only available for 2026.

== Disability plates ==
Image	Base	Dates Issued	Serial format	Symbol of Access	Serials issued
	2007 passenger	January 1, 2007–April 2013	1234A5	Embossed at left	0000E0 to approximately 9149G9
	Spectacular Peninsulas	January 1, 2007 – December 1, 2021	1A2345	Embossed at left	0J0000 to 1K7937
	Pure Michigan	April 2013–present	1234A5	Embossed at left	0000J0 to 2468M9 (as of June 2023)
	Mackinac Bridge	October 13, 2014–present	A1234	Embossed at left	A7708 to approximately M2662 (as of October 2024)
	Water-Winter Wonderland	December 2, 2021–present	1K2345	Screened at bottom left	2K0000 to 4K6063 (as of June 2023)
	Water Wonderland	January 27, 2024–present	12E345	Screened at bottom left	00E000 to 00E400 (as of July 2024)
	Great Lake State	February 1, 2025–present	CB1CDE	Screened at bottom left	CA0AAA to CA9ABP (as of September 6, 2025)
	Great Lakes	February 1, 2025–present	CBC12D	Screened at bottom left	CAA00A to CAA40A (as of September 6, 2025)

== Non-passenger plates ==
Image	Type	Base	Distinguishing features	Serial format	Serials issued	Notes
	State Government	2007 passenger	"STATE GOVT" screened at bottom	123456 1234567		used on state-owned vehicles, except State Police
	State Government	Pure Michigan without wave	"STATE GOVT" screened at bottom	123456 1234567		used on state-owned vehicles, except State Police
	State Police	Pure Michigan passenger	Black serial; Michigan State Police emblem to left of serial	State Police fleet number		Front and rear plates on blue marked patrol vehicles; first digit usually corresponds to MSP district number or special division; number usually also painted on top of vehicle
	Commercial	2007 passenger	Identical to passenger plate; distinguished only by serial format	CA 12345	CA 00000 to CF 13999	
	Commercial	Pure Michigan passenger	Identical to passenger plate; distinguished only by serial format	DA 12345	DA 00000 to ~DF 94791 (as of March 2025)	
	Commercial	2013 Mackinac Bridge	Identical to passenger plate; distinguished only by serial format	AA 1234	from AA 0000	
	Commercial	2014 Mackinac Bridge	Identical to passenger plate; distinguished only by serial format	AA 1234	through ~AD 8021 (as of August 2024)	
	Dealer	Pure Michigan without wave	"DEALER" screened at bottom	123 D 45; 12 D 345; 123 D 456	000 D 000 to 077 D 999 (as of May 2026)	
	Historical		Maize on dark blue, "HISTORICAL VEHICLE" embossed below.	123 456	000 000 to approximately 077 633	Issued to vehicles that are at least 26 years old. Must be replaced after each 10-year renewal cycle.
	Historical	2007 passenger	2007—2013 passenger base with "HISTORICAL" at bottom	123456	078000 to 228983	Issued to vehicles that are at least 26 years old. Must be replaced after each 10-year renewal cycle.
	Historical		Pure Michigan logo at top, "HISTORICAL" at bottom	123456	300000 to 382808 (as of July 2023)	Issued to vehicles that are at least 26 years old. Must be replaced after each 10-year renewal cycle.
	In-Transit Repair	Pure Michigan without wave	"IN-TRANSIT REPAIR" screened at bottom	12G345 123G456		
	Manufacturer	Pure Michigan without wave	"MANUFACTURER" screened at bottom	123M456		
	Municipal	2007 passenger		123 X 456	000 X 000 to 129 X 999	used on almost all government-owned vehicles (including police), except county sheriff's departments and State of Michigan-owned vehicles; was the last plate to use the 2007 base until it was updated in 2024.
	Municipal	Pure Michigan without wave		123 X 456	130 X 000 to ~136 X 999 (as of January 2026)	used on almost all government-owned vehicles (including police), except county sheriff's departments and State of Michigan-owned vehicles; was the last plate to use the 2007 base until it was updated in 2024.
	Tribal Government	2007 passenger	"TRIBAL GOVERNMENT" screened at bottom	900 X 456		
	Tribal Government	Pure Michigan without wave	"TRIBAL GOVERNMENT" screened at bottom	901 X 456		
	Nonprofit	2007 passenger	"NONPROFIT" screened at bottom	123 Y 456		Offered to non-profit organizations (including private schools) for a low fee. 5-year renewal cycle.
	Nonprofit	Pure Michigan without wave	"NONPROFIT" screened at bottom	123 Y 456		Offered to non-profit organizations (including private schools) for a low fee. 5-year renewal cycle.
	Repossession	Pure Michigan without wave	"REPOSSESSION" screened at bottom	123R456		
	Special Equipment	Pure Michigan without wave	"SPECIAL EQUIPMENT" screened at bottom	123S456		
	Special Farm	Pure Michigan without wave	"SPECIAL FARM" screened at bottom	123F456	011F000 to 018F012 (As of March 24, 2024)	
	Transporter	Pure Michigan without wave	"TRANSPORTER" screened at bottom	123T456		
	Fleet	2007 passenger	2007–2013 passenger base, "FLEET" at bottom	PF 12345		Usually used on utility service trucks & UPS trucks.
	Fleet	Pure Michigan without wave	Pure Michigan logo at top, "FLEET" at bottom	PF 12345	through PF 19849 (as of October 2024)	Usually used on utility service trucks & UPS trucks.
	Rental Fleet	Pure Michigan without wave	Pure Michigan logo at top, "FLEET" at bottom	12345 RF	00000 RF to 13700 RF (as of June 2024)	Used on rental vehicles.
	Apportioned	2007 passenger	2007–2013 passenger base with "APPORTIONED" at bottom	RA 12345	RA 00000 to ~RA 92999	often used on commercial trucks & motorcoaches
	Apportioned	Pure Michigan without wave	Pure Michigan logo at top, "APPORTIONED" at bottom	RA 12345	RB 00000 to RC 27961 (as of July 2023)	often used on commercial trucks & motorcoaches
	Truck	Pure Michigan without wave	Pure Michigan logo at top, weight class sticker at bottom	AB12345	BA00000 to BE05253 (as of November 2024)	front and rear plates on tractor-trailers
	Wrecker	Pure Michigan without wave	Pure Michigan logo at top, "WRECKER" sticker at bottom	AB12345	BA00000 to BE05253 (as of November 2024)	used on tow trucks
	Farm	Pure Michigan without wave	Pure Michigan logo at top, "FARM" at bottom	AB12345	BA00000 to BE05253 (as of November 2024)	
	Trailer	2007 passenger	2007–2013 passenger base; "PERMANENT TRAILER" screened at bottom	A123456		
	Trailer	Pure Michigan without wave	Pure Michigan logo at top, "PERMANENT TRAILER" screened at bottom	A123456	D000000 to F134612 (as of October 2024)	
	Sheriff's Department	2007 passenger	Black serial; "SHERIFF" screened in gold at bottom; Michigan Sheriffs' Association emblem in center	12 345		First two digits county coded alphabetically; for example, the Oakland County Sheriff's Office is assigned "63" as "Oakland" falls 63rd in an alphabetical list of Michigan counties
	Sheriff's Department	Pure Michigan without wave	Black serial; "SHERIFF" screened in gold at bottom; Michigan Sheriffs' Association emblem in center	12 345		First two digits county coded alphabetically; for example, the Oakland County Sheriff's Office is assigned "63" as "Oakland" falls 63rd in an alphabetical list of Michigan counties
	Sheriff's Department	Black	"SHERIFF" embossed at bottom	12🟌345		First two digits county coded alphabetically; for example, the Oakland County Sheriff's Office is assigned "63" as "Oakland" falls 63rd in an alphabetical list of Michigan counties

== Special plates ==
=== Organizations ===
Special plates are available to members of certain groups. Each is currently made with the Pure Michigan base, with an emblem to the serial's left, and a 5-character serial format.

Image	Group	Emblem	Serial format	Notes
	Amateur radio operators	Radio tower	FCC call sign	
	Fraternal Order of Police	FOP emblem	1AB23	
	Freemasons	Square and Compasses	1AB23	
	Michigan Professional Fire Fighters Union	MPFFU emblem	1AB23	"Professional Fire Fighter" at bottom
	Michigan State Firemen's Association	MSFA emblem	1AB23	"Firefighter" at bottom
	Police Officers' Association of Michigan	POAM emblem	1AB23	"The Choice of Professionals" at bottom

=== University fundraising ===
Since September 2000, special plates have been offered to raise funds for each of Michigan's 15 public universities. Each uses the Pure Michigan baseplate with the college's name at the bottom and the university's logo to the serial's left, and all share the same serial format and range.

Image	University	Emblem	Serial format	Notes
	Central Michigan University	"Block C" logo	AB12C (A12BC for certain mail-in orders)	
	Eastern Michigan University	"Block E" logo	AB12C (A12BC for certain mail-in orders)	
	Ferris State University	Bulldogs logo	AB12C (A12BC for certain mail-in orders)	
	Grand Valley State University	"Block GV" logo	AB12C (A12BC for certain mail-in orders)	
	Lake Superior State University	Anchor logo	AB12C (A12BC for certain mail-in orders)	
	Michigan State University	"Block S" logo	AB12C (A12BC for certain mail-in orders)	
	Michigan State University	"Sparty" emblem	AB12C (A12BC for certain mail-in orders)	
	Michigan Technological University	"1885" logo	AB12C (A12BC for certain mail-in orders)	
	Northern Michigan University	Wildcats logo	AB12C (A12BC for certain mail-in orders)	
	Oakland University	Golden Grizzly logo	AB12C (A12BC for certain mail-in orders)	
	Saginaw Valley State University	Cardinal logo	AB12C (A12BC for certain mail-in orders)	
	University of Michigan	"Block M" logo	AB12C (A12BC for certain mail-in orders)	Bottom reads "GO BLUE" rather than "University of Michigan"
	University of Michigan-Dearborn	"Block M" UM-Dearborn logo	AB12C (A12BC for certain mail-in orders)	
	University of Michigan-Flint	"Block M" UM-Flint logo	AB12C (A12BC for certain mail-in orders)	
	Wayne State University	"W" logo	AB12C (A12BC for certain mail-in orders)	
	Wayne State University	"W" shield logo	AB12C (A12BC for certain mail-in orders)	Introduced in 2018
	Western Michigan University	Circle "W" logo	AB12C (A12BC for certain mail-in orders)	

=== Special cause fundraising ===
Special plates have been offered since 2001 to raise funds for certain charitable causes. State law limits the number of fundraising plates (excluding universities) available at one time to 20, and 14 are currently in production. Each is currently made with the Pure Michigan base, with an emblem to the serial's left, and a 5-character serial format; prior to 2013, they were made with the 2007-2013 passenger base.

Image	Cause	Emblem	Tagline	Years issued	Serial format	Notes
	Agricultural heritage	Barn and fields insignia	"Agricultural Heritage"	2001–present	AB12C (A12BC for certain mail-in orders)	
	Breast cancer awareness	Pink ribbon	"Early Detection Saves Lives"	2014–present	AB12C (A12BC for certain mail-in orders)	
	Children's Trust Fund	"Just Love 'Em"	"Children"	from 2001	AB12C (A12BC for certain mail-in orders)	
	Children's Trust Fund	Hand	"Children's Trust Fund"	until 2022	AB12C (A12BC for certain mail-in orders)	
	Children Trust Michigan	Pinwheel	"Strength Through Abuse Prevention"	2022–present	AB12C (A12BC for certain mail-in orders)	
	Detroit Lions Charities	Lions logo	"Detroit Lions"	2019–present	AB12C (A12BC for certain mail-in orders)	
	Detroit Pistons Foundation	Pistons logo	"Detroit Basketball"	2019–present	AB12C (A12BC for certain mail-in orders)	
	Detroit Red Wings Foundation	Red Wings logo	"Detroit Red Wings"	2019–present	AB12C (A12BC for certain mail-in orders)	
	Detroit Tigers Foundation	Tigers "English D" logo	"Detroit Tigers"	2019–present	AB12C (A12BC for certain mail-in orders)	
	Donate Life	Donate Life logo	"Be an Organ, Eye, & Tissue Donor"	2012–present	AB12C (A12BC for certain mail-in orders)	
	Ducks Unlimited	Ducks Unlimited logo	"Ducks Unlimited"	2014–present	AB12C (A12BC for certain mail-in orders)	
	Lighthouse preservation	White Shoal Light	"Save Our Lights"	2001–2017	AB12C (A12BC for certain mail-in orders)	
	Lighthouse preservation	Generic lighthouse insignia	"Protect Michigan Lighthouses"	2017–present	AB12C (A12BC for certain mail-in orders)	
	NMU Olympic Education Center	Team USA logo	"Go Team USA"	2012–present	AB12C (A12BC for certain mail-in orders)	
	American Red Cross & Salvation Army	United States flag	"Proud to be an American"	2001–present	AB12C (A12BC for certain mail-in orders)	
	Michigan Veterans Affairs Agency	"Veterans" emblem	"Support Michigan Veterans"	2001–present	AB12C (A12BC for certain mail-in orders)	
	Michigan Vietnam Veterans Monument	Dog tags	"Lest We Forget"	2001–present	AB12C (A12BC for certain mail-in orders)	
	Water quality	Sailboat insignia	"Protecting Our Waters"	2001–present	AB12C (A12BC for certain mail-in orders)	
	Wildlife habitat conservation	Loon	"Conserve Wildlife Habitat"	2001–2017	AB12C (A12BC for certain mail-in orders)	
	Wildlife habitat conservation	Elk	"2018 Marks 100 Years of Elk"	2018–2021	AB12C (A12BC for certain mail-in orders)	
	Wildlife habitat conservation	Kirtland's warbler	"Conserve Wildlife Habitat"	2022–present	AB12C (A12BC for certain mail-in orders)	

As of November 2023, three new fundraising plates are currently being considered in the Michigan Legislature: one supporting Michigan's 4-H organizations, another funding sickle cell anemia research, and a third supporting prostate cancer prevention.

Legislation was passed in June 2017 to offer an anti-abortion Choose Life plate in Michigan, but was vetoed by Governor Rick Snyder.

=== Veterans ===
Image	Type	Design	Serial format	Notes
	Afghanistan Campaign Medal	Afghanistan Campaign Medal with "AFGHANISTAN" topped at left, "VETERAN" centered at bottom	1ABC2	
	Afghanistan	"AFGHANISTAN" at left, "VETERAN" centered at bottom	1ABC2	
	Air Force	United States Air Force logo at left, "VETERAN" centered at bottom	1ABC2	
	Army	United States Army logo at left, "VETERAN" centered at bottom	1ABC2	
	Blue Star Family	State inside an outlined star at left, stars before and after "BLUE STAR FAMILY" centered at bottom	1ABC2	
	Coast Guard	United States Coast Guard emblem at left, "VETERAN" centered at bottom	1ABC2	
	Cuban Missile Crisis	"CUBAN MISSILE CRISIS" at left, "VETERAN" centered at bottom	1ABC2	
	Disabled Veteran	"DISABLED VETERAN" centered at bottom	DV123A; DV1234A	
	Disabled Veteran (Permanent)	"DISABLED VETERAN" centered at bottom, "NON-EXP" at bottom right	DV123A; DV1234A	
	Dominican Republic	"DOMINICAN REPUBLIC" at left, "VETERAN" centered at bottom	1ABC2	
	Ex-Prisoner of War	"EX POW" stacked at left, "EX-PRISONER OF WAR" centered at bottom	12A34	
	Gold Star Family	Gold Star service banner at left, "GOLD STAR FAMILY" centered at bottom	12 GS 34	
	Grenada	"GRENADA" at left, "VETERAN" centered at bottom	1ABC2	
	Iraq Campaign Medal	Iraq Campaign Medal with "IRAQ" topped at left, "VETERAN" centered at bottom	1ABC2	
	Iraq	"IRAQ" at left, "VETERAN" centered at bottom	1ABC2	
	Korean War	"KOREA" at left, "VETERAN" centered at bottom	1ABC2	
	Laos	"LAOS" at left, "VETERAN" centered at bottom	1ABC2	
	Lebanon	"LEBANON" at left, "VETERAN" centered at bottom	1ABC2	
	Marine Corps	United States Marine Corps emblem at left, "VETERAN" centered at bottom	1ABC2	
	Medal of Honor	United States Medal of Honor at left, stars before and after "MEDAL OF HONOR" centered at bottom	MH 12	
	Merchant Marine	Merchant Marine seal at left, "MERCHANT MARINE" centered at bottom		
	Military Reserve	"MILITARY RESERVE" at left, "VETERAN" centered at bottom	1ZA23	
	National Guard	National Guard logo at left, "NATIONAL GUARD" centered at bottom	1ABC2	
	Navy	United States Navy emblem at left, "VETERAN centered at bottom	1ABC2	
	Panama	"PANAMA" at left, "VETERAN" centered at bottom	1ABC2	
	Pearl Harbor Survivor	"PEARL HARBOR SURVIVOR" centered at bottom	1A2345	
	Persian Gulf	"PERSIAN GULF" at left, "VETERAN" centered at bottom	1ABC2	
	Prisoner of War	"POW" stacked at left, "PRISONER OF WAR" centered at bottom	12P34	
	Purple Heart	Purple Heart medal at left, "COMBAT WOUNDED VETERAN" centered at bottom	123A4	
	Somalia	"SOMALIA" at left, "VETERAN" centered at bottom	1ABC2	
	Vietnam Service Medal	Vietnam Service Medal with "VIETNAM" topped at left, "VETERAN" centered at bottom	1ABC2	
	Vietnam	"VIETNAM" at left, "VETERAN" centered at bottom	1ABC2	
	Woman Veteran	"HER SERVICE, OUR FREEDOM" at left, "WOMAN VETERAN" centered at bottom		
	World War I	"WWI" stacked at left, "WORLD WAR I VETERAN" centered at bottom	12W34	
	World War II	"WORLD WAR II" at left, "VETERAN" centered at bottom	1ABC2	
