= Vehicle registration plates of the territories of the United States =

A map of administrative divisions of the United States.

All five inhabited United States territories require and issue license plates to vehicles. Puerto Rico was the first to require residents to register their motor vehicles and display license plates in 1906. However, the first territory to actually issue license plates was the former U.S. territory of the Panama Canal Zone, which began in 1910 and continued until September 1979.

== History ==
In 1901, New York became the first U.S. state to require vehicle registration plates. Vehicle owners were responsible for providing their own license plates, which displayed their initials. These early plates were typically made of metal letters attached to leather or steel bases. Massachusetts became the first state to issue official license plates on September 1, 1903, to Frederick Tudor. In 1918, Florida began issuing official license plates to vehicle owners, marking the end of the prestate era. After Alaska and Hawaii joined the Union in 1959, all U.S. states required and issued license plates.

== Current inhabited territories ==
=== American Samoa ===
American Samoa first required residents to register motor vehicles and display license plates in 1924. The plates are North American standard 12 by 6 inches (30 cm × 15 cm), with the current series introduced in 2011. They use a four-digit serial format (1234) and are made of aluminum. The plates display the slogan "Motu O Fiafiaga," meaning "Island of Paradise" in Samoan.

In 1956, the United States, Canada, and Mexico, in coordination with the American Association of Motor Vehicle Administrators, the Automobile Manufacturers Association, and the National Safety Council, standardized the size of license plates (except motorcycles) at 6 inches (15 cm) in height by 12 inches (30 cm) in width, with uniform mounting holes. American Samoa adopted these standards in 1977.

=== Guam ===
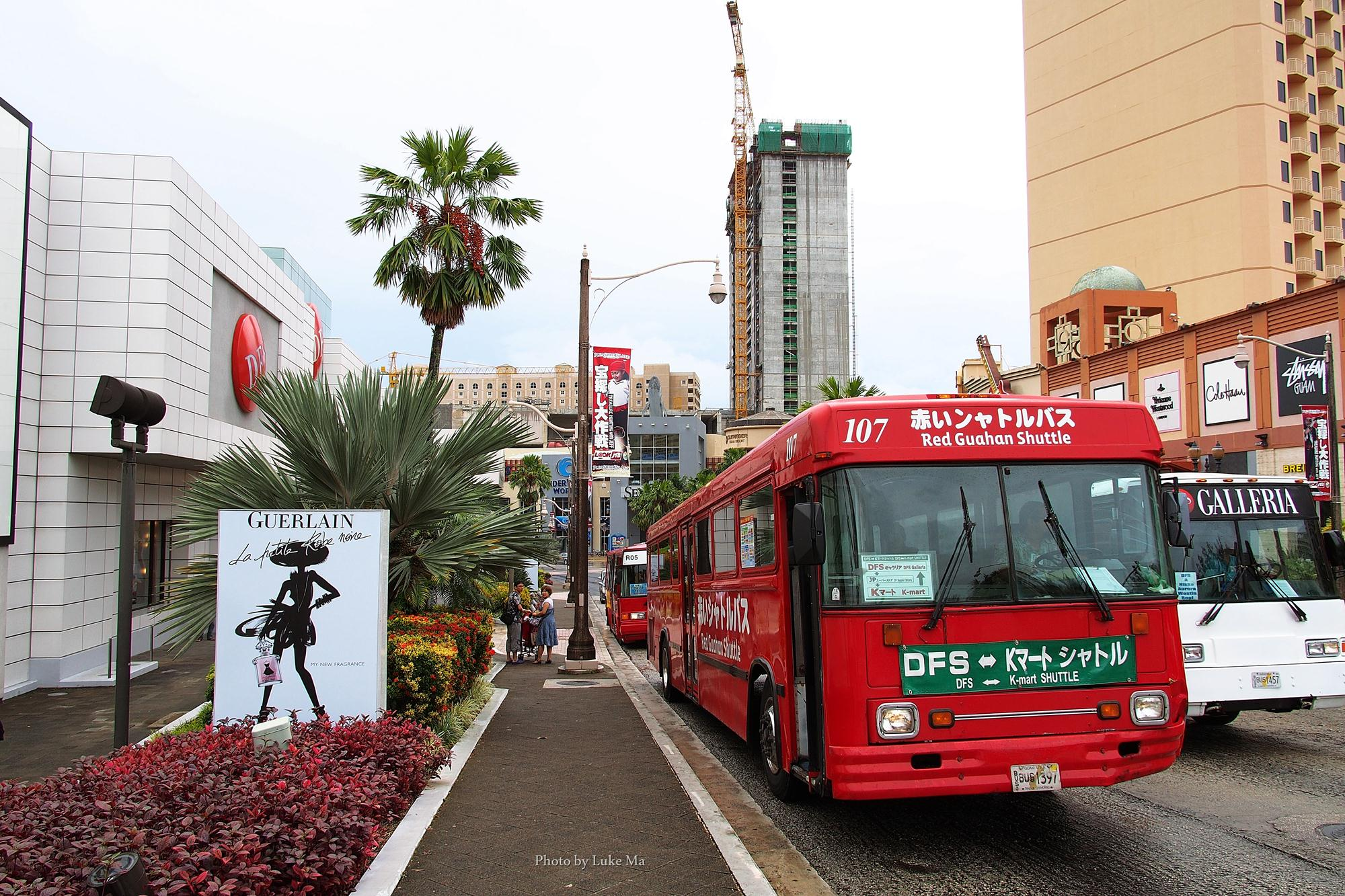
A shuttle bus near Tumon Bay displaying a license plate from the 1994 series.

Guam first required residents to register motor vehicles and display license plates in 1916. The plates are North American standard 12 by 6 inches (30 cm × 15 cm), with the current series introduced on February 27, 2009. They use a two-letter, four-digit alphanumeric serial format (AB 1234) coded by municipality and are made of aluminum. The plates display the slogan "Tano Y Chamorro," meaning "The Land and the People" in Chamorro.

In 1956, the United States, Canada, and Mexico, in coordination with the American Association of Motor Vehicle Administrators, the Automobile Manufacturers Association, and the National Safety Council, standardized the size of license plates (except motorcycles) at 6 inches (15 cm) in height by 12 inches (30 cm) in width, with uniform mounting holes. Guam adopted these standards in 1960.

On the 1994 base, passenger plate serial letters indicated the village of issuance. These three-letter codes were displayed in a smaller font than the numerical portion of the serial. Commercial truck plates were also coded by location, but used a different system based on specific geographical areas or features rather than political jurisdictions. Bus, dealer, taxi, and trailer plates were coded only by type, not location.

Since 1996, all passenger plates have featured a round mounting hole at the top right and horizontal slots in the other three corners, consistent with plates from Hawaii and the Northern Mariana Islands. On the 2009 base, passenger plate letters again indicate the village of issuance. These two-letter codes are displayed in the same font size as the numerical portion of the serial.

=== Northern Mariana Islands ===
The Northern Mariana Islands first required residents to register their motor vehicles and display license plates in 1968, with the current series introduced in 2005. The islands, formerly under Japanese administration, became part of the United States in 1947 as the UN Trust Territory of the Pacific Islands. The plates use a three-letter, three-number alphanumeric serial format (ABC 123), coded by administrative division, and are made of aluminum. They feature the slogan "HAFA ADAI," meaning "Hello" in Chamorro.

=== Puerto Rico ===
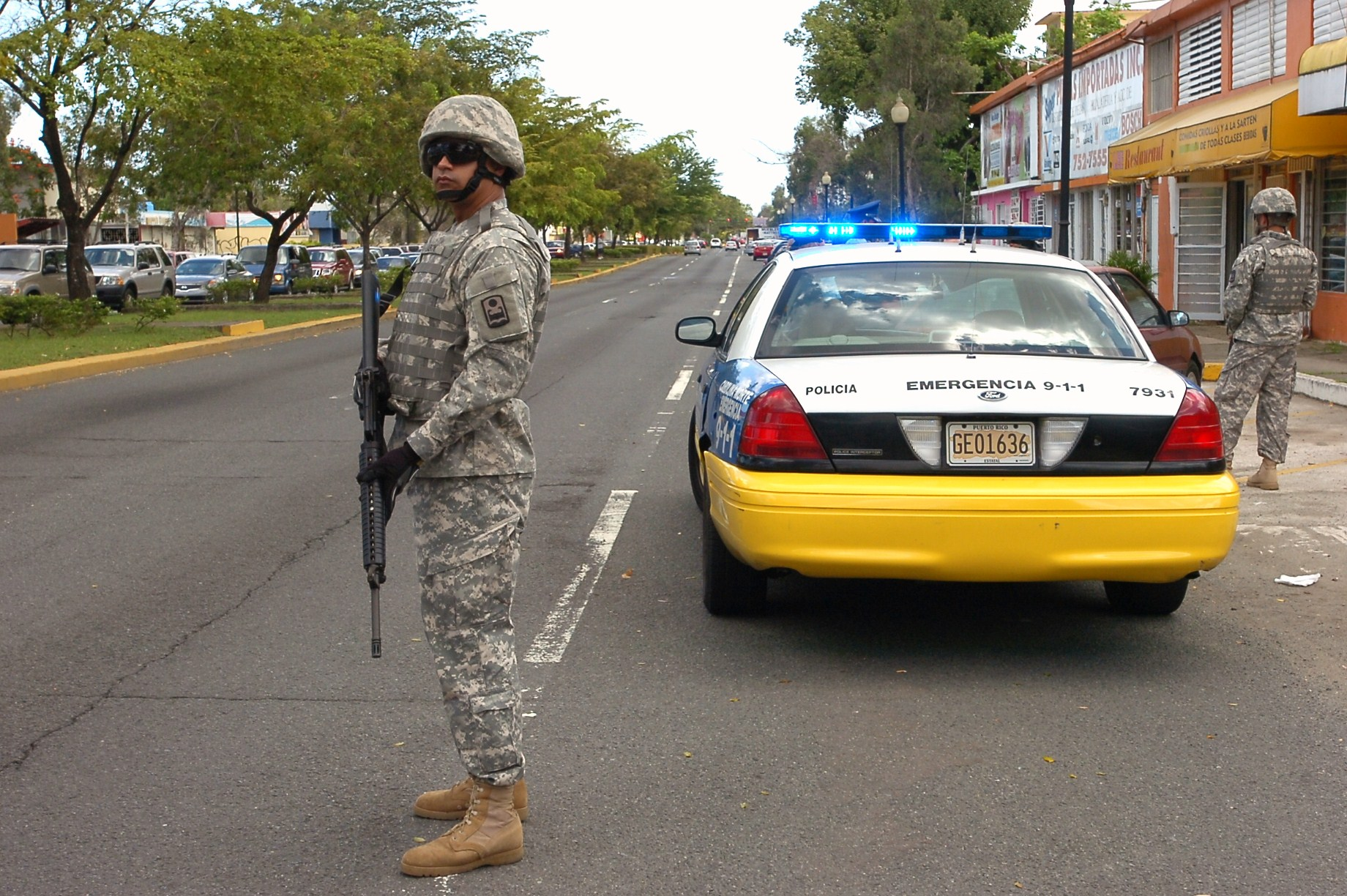
A Puerto Rico National Guard soldier assists in a traffic stop in San Juan as part of Operation Shared Response. The vehicle displays a government-issued license plate, typically used on police and other official vehicles.

Puerto Rico first required residents to register their motor vehicles and display vehicle registration plates in 1906. Only rear plates have been required since 1976. The plates are North American standard 12 by 6 inches (30 cm × 15 cm), with the current series introduced in March 2023. They use a three-letter, three-number alphanumeric serial format (ABC 123), coded by municipality, and are made of aluminum. The plates display the slogan "Isla del Encanto," meaning "Island of Enchantment" in Puerto Rican Spanish.

In 1956, the United States, Canada, and Mexico, in coordination with the American Association of Motor Vehicle Administrators, the Automobile Manufacturers Association, and the National Safety Council, standardized the size of license plates (except motorcycles) at 6 inches (15 cm) in height by 12 inches (30 cm) in width, with uniform mounting holes. The 1955 (dated 1956) issue was the first Puerto Rico plate to comply with these standards. In 2012, the Puerto Rican government began issuing optional European-style plates featuring the same design language as the standard plates but in a longer, narrower format common in Europe.

=== United States Virgin Islands ===
The United States Virgin Islands first required residents to register their motor vehicles and display license plates in 1917. The plates are North American standard 12 by 6 inches (30 cm × 15 cm), with the current series introduced on March 1, 2023. They use a three-letter, three-number alphanumeric serial format (ABC 123), coded by island of issuance, and are made of aluminum. The plates display the slogan "175th Emancipation," referring to the 175th anniversary of the emancipation of enslaved people in the Danish West Indies.

In 1956, the United States, Canada, and Mexico, in coordination with the American Association of Motor Vehicle Administrators, the Automobile Manufacturers Association, and the National Safety Council, standardized the size of license plates (except motorcycles) at 6 inches (15 cm) in height by 12 inches (30 cm) in width, with uniform mounting holes. The U.S. Virgin Islands adopted these standards in 1956, having previously issued plates of the same dimensions but with non-standard mounting holes since 1952.

== Unincorporated, unorganized territories ==
=== Midway Atoll ===
Midway Atoll is an unincorporated territory of the United States, formerly administered by the U.S. Navy and currently managed by the U.S. Fish and Wildlife Service under the Department of the Interior. The island has had no permanent population since around 2010. The territorial government issued license plates for cars, bicycles, and mopeds during the 1970s, with issuance ceasing in the 1980s.

=== Wake Island ===
Wake Island is an unincorporated territory of the United States, administered by the Department of the Interior and managed by the U.S. Air Force. The island has no permanent population. The territorial government began issuing license plates for private or passenger vehicles in the 1950s. Additional series were released in 1963, 1965, 1968, and throughout the 1970s. Plates for non-passenger and military vehicles were also issued in the 1950s and 1960s, with motorcycle series released in 1963, 1965, 1968, and the 1970s. All license plate issuance ceased in the 1970s.

== Former U.S. territories ==
=== Panama Canal Zone ===
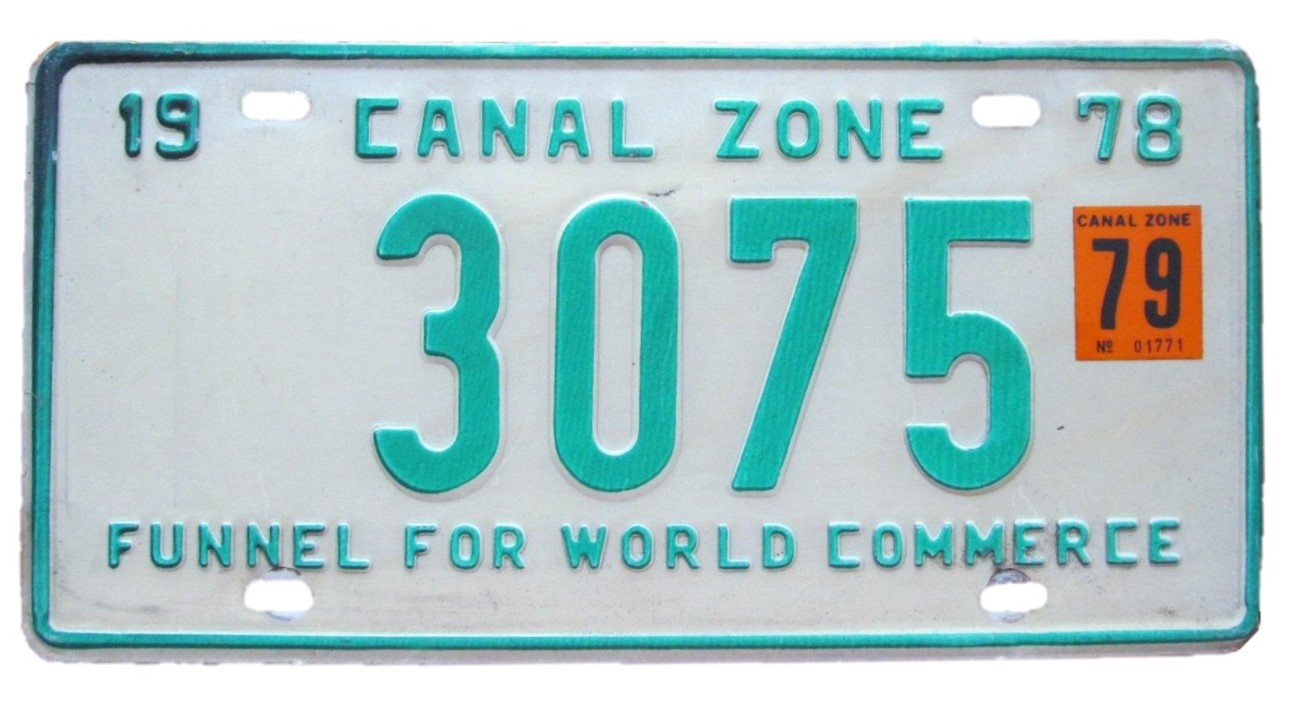
1979 passenger car license plate from the Canal Zone, the final series issued.

The former U.S. territory of the Panama Canal Zone first issued license plates in 1910, continuing until September 1979. The final plate, issued on December 31, 1978, by the Canal Zone Government, was North American standard 12 by 6 inches (30 cm × 15 cm), used a five-digit serial format (12345), and was made of aluminum. The plates displayed the slogan "Funnel For World Commerce." A single plate was issued for all years, with the 1979 plate consisting of the 1978 plate with a 1979 decal affixed.

Panama also issued license plates identifying U.S. citizens who lived in Panama but worked in the Canal Zone, with the country name "Panama" clearly visible. Reciprocity for license plates between the Canal Zone and Panama did not exist until 1950, so some historical photos show vehicles with both plates mounted.

In 1953, miniature automobile license plates were included in Wheaties cereal boxes, often called bicycle license plates. One set issued by General Mills included a Canal Zone plate, along with plates from Alaska, the District of Columbia, the Dominican Republic, Guam, Hawaii, Italy-Military, the Philippines, the U.S. Virgin Islands, and a Maharajah plate featuring a golden double-headed eagle. All plates in the set shared the same serial number, with Canal Zone plates marked W3966.

=== Philippines ===
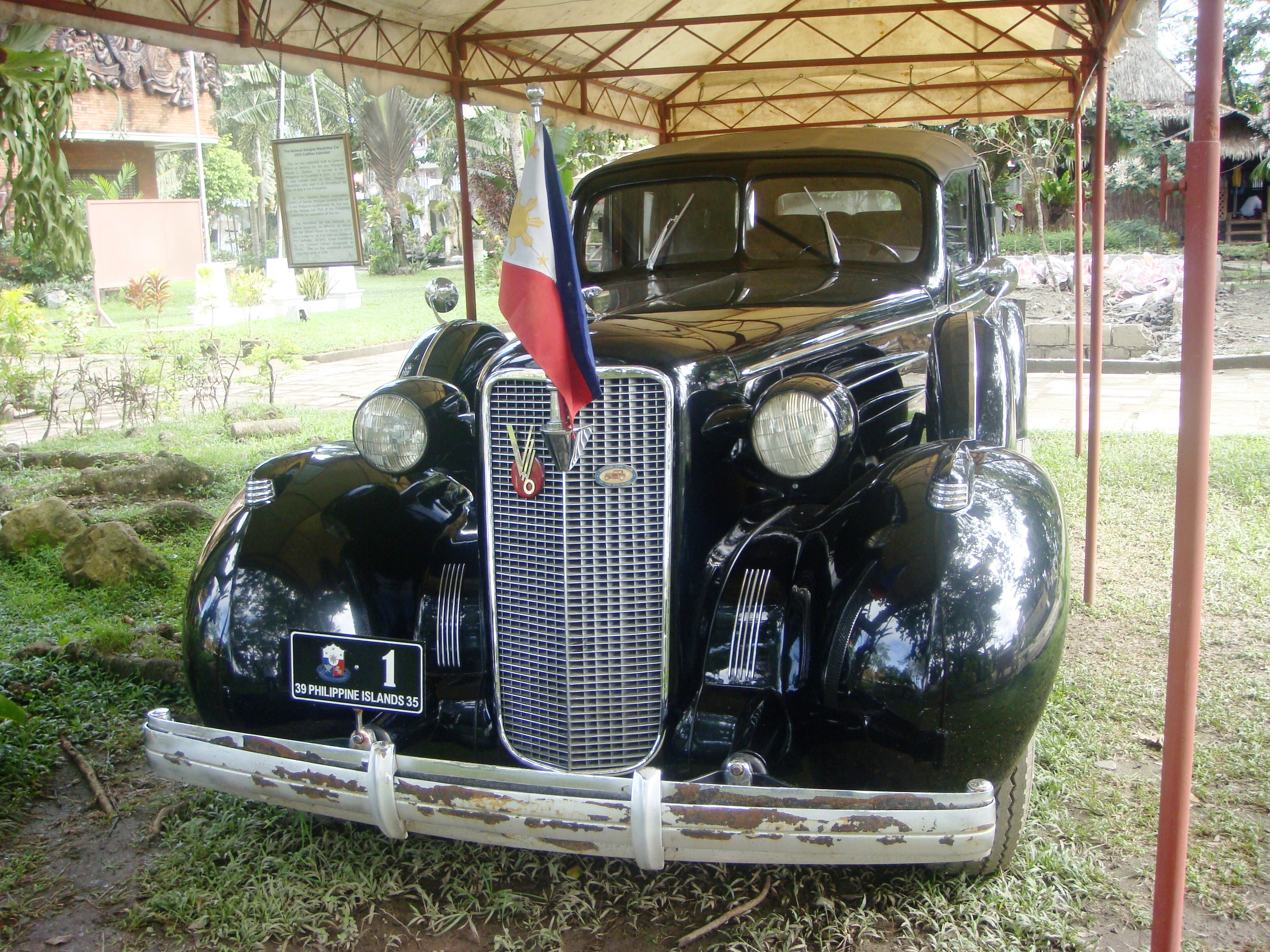
A 1934 Cadillac V-16 owned by Field Marshal Douglas MacArthur, with a license plate issued by the Commonwealth of the Philippines.

The Philippine Revolution began in August 1896 against Spain. Following Spain's defeat in the Battle of Manila Bay, the revolution resumed, culminating in the Philippine Declaration of Independence and the establishment of the First Philippine Republic. The Philippine–American War followed, resulting in significant destruction and casualties and the eventual defeat of the Philippine Republic.

During the U.S. administration of the Philippines, Act No. 2159 was enacted in 1912 under the Insular Government of the Philippine Islands to regulate and license motor vehicle operators. This law created the Automobile Section within the Administrative Division of the Bureau of Public Works. In 1926, Act No. 3045 consolidated all existing motor vehicle laws and upgraded the Automobile Section to the Automobile Division, still under the Bureau of Public Works. Act No. 3992, known as the Revised Motor Vehicle Law, was enacted in 1933, amending Act No. 3045 and renaming the Automobile Division as the Division of Motor Vehicles.

U.S. influence over the Philippines continued until 1945, interrupted by the Japanese occupation of the Commonwealth of the Philippines from 1941 to 1945 during World War II.

Following Japan's surrender, the United States regained control of the Philippines and granted the country independence on 4 July 1946. In 1945, before independence, the Department of Public Works and Highways issued Department Order No. 4, reorganizing the Division of Motor Vehicles after the country's liberation. Executive Order No. 94, promulgated in 1947, reorganized executive departments, bureaus, and offices, upgrading the Division of Motor Vehicles to the Motor Vehicles Office (MVO) under the Bureau category.

The MVO was abolished in 1964 by Republic Act No. 4136, also known as the Land Transportation and Traffic Code, which consolidated laws related to transportation and traffic, established a land transportation commission, and defined its duties. The Land Transportation Commission was responsible for vehicle registration, operator licensing, and driver licensing. Regional offices were established to implement these duties, and the powers and functions previously held by the Chief of the Motor Vehicles were transferred to the Land Transportation Commissioner.

During the Marcos administration, Executive Order No. 546, issued in 1979, established the Ministry of Transportation and Communications (MOTC). The Land Transportation Commission was renamed the Bureau of Land Transportation and incorporated into the ministry. In 1985, Executive Order No. 1011 abolished the Board of Transportation and the Bureau of Land Transportation, reestablishing the Land Transportation Commission. The commission was tasked with registering motor vehicles, licensing drivers and conductors, franchising public utility vehicles, and enforcing land transportation regulations.

In 1987, the Land Transportation Commission was abolished and replaced by two offices: the Land Transportation Office (LTO) and the Land Transportation Franchising and Regulatory Board (LTFRB). The LTO assumed the functions of the former commission, while the LTFRB took over the functions of the Board of Transportation. At the same time, the Ministry of Transportation and Communications (MOTC) was renamed the Department of Transportation and Communications (DOTC).

== Compact of Free Association states ==
Map of the Compact of Free Association (COFA) nations: Palau, the Federated States of Micronesia, and the Marshall Islands shown in red; the United States shown in blue.

The Compacts of Free Association (COFA) are international agreements that establish and govern the relationships of free association between the United States and three Pacific Island sovereign states: the Federated States of Micronesia (FSM), the Republic of the Marshall Islands (RMI), and the Republic of Palau. These countries are collectively known as the "Freely Associated States" (FASs). All three agreements are set to expire in 2043.

=== Federated States of Micronesia ===
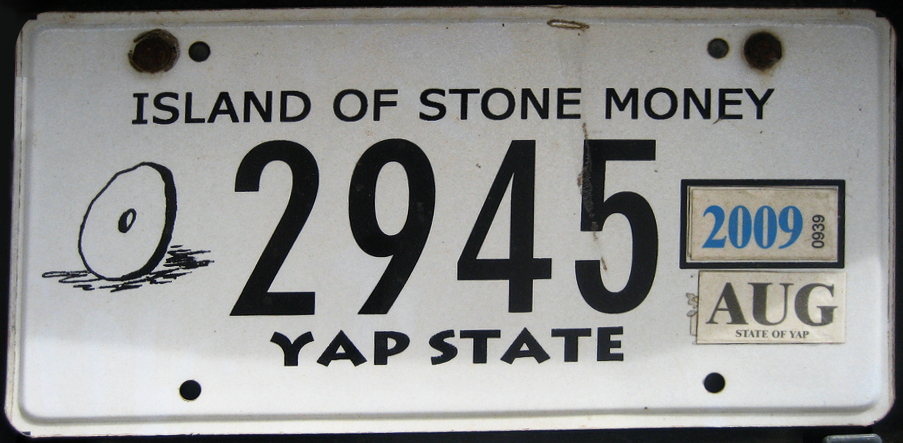
A vehicle license plate from Yap State.

The Federated States of Micronesia requires residents to register their motor vehicles and display vehicle registration plates. The plates are North American standard 12 by 6 inches (30 cm × 15 cm), with the current series introduced in 2000. They use a four-digit serial format (1234) and display the slogan "ISLAND OF STONE MONEY," referring to the island of Yap, where the traditional currency known as Rai originated.

The plate designs vary by state, with Chuuk, Kosrae, Pohnpei, and Yap each issuing their own plates. Although the history of license plates in these islands is not well documented, Chuuk, then known as Truk, had plates as early as 1964.

=== Marshall Islands ===
The Marshall Islands first required residents to register their motor vehicles and display vehicle registration plates in 1972. The plates are North American standard 12 by 6 inches (30 cm × 15 cm). They use a four-digit serial format (1234) and are made of either silver or wood. The plates display the slogan "MAJURO ATOLL," referring to Majuro Atoll, the capital of the Marshall Islands.

=== Palau ===
Palau requires residents to register their motor vehicles and display vehicle registration plates. The plates are North American standard 12 by 6 inches (30 cm × 15 cm). Most states issue metal plates, some of which are stamped, while others are hand-painted, stenciled, or printed on laminated paper affixed to a wooden base. Some states issue new plates periodically, while others use revalidation stickers.

The designs vary by state, with each issuing its own plates, despite populations ranging from fewer than 100 residents to about 14,000. In the 1980s, political violence related to the nuclear issue prompted the introduction of a national plate in the 1990s, but plate issuance has since reverted to state-level production.
