= United States license plate designs and serial formats =

In the United States, the appearance of license plates is frequently chosen to contain symbols, colors, or slogans associated with the issuing jurisdiction, which are the 50 U.S. states, the District of Columbia, the five inhabited U.S. territories, and Native American tribes, each of which independently registers motor vehicles. Regular-issue license plates for passenger vehicles typically have six or seven characters, with vanity plates having up to eight characters in a few states.

== Designs ==
License plates in the United States often contain imagery associated with the state. A notable example is the Bucking Horse and Rider logo, which has been featured on Wyoming's license plates since 1936. From 1937 to 1956, Tennessee's license plates were constructed in a parallelogram shape similar to the state itself. This design element was carried over in almost every Tennessee plate since.

Other states offer a more simple license plate design with little decoration other than a slogan. Vermont's license plates have frequently used a white-on-green color scheme, while Alaska has preferred blue and yellow. New Jersey's license plates, while otherwise basic, are noted for having a yellow gradient background. Similarly, Connecticut's license plates feature a navy blue background. The license plates of California, Maryland, Massachusetts, Michigan, Texas, and Virginia all feature a plain white background. Delaware's plates have featured gold text on a black background since the 1960s.

As of 2025, the five oldest plate designs currently in use are those of Delaware (since 1959), Colorado (since 1960, continuously since 1978), Washington, D.C. (since 1975), Minnesota (since 1978), and North Carolina (since 1982). Each of these designs have received some minor cosmetic changes since their introduction, but have otherwise been virtually untouched.

Non-passenger plates tend to have a design and serial format differing from the passenger plates. This allows for more passenger plate availability.

=== Slogans ===
Many license plates also feature a slogan associated with the state. The first state to feature a slogan on their license plate was Idaho in 1928. These license plates featured the slogan "IDAHO POTATOES", which would eventually morph into the "Famous Potatoes" slogan featured on present-day Idaho plates. The oldest continually used license plate slogan is Maine's "Vacationland", in use since 1936. In 1940, Arizona started using the slogan "Grand Canyon State", on its license plates, and Wisconsin started using the slogan "America's Dairyland". Illinois has featured the slogan "Land of Lincoln" on its license plates since 1954.

North Carolina has famously used the slogan "First in Flight" on its license plates since 1982, as a nod to the Wright Flyer. Later on, in 1998, the Wright brothers' home state of Ohio adopted the slogan "Birthplace of Aviation" for its license plates.

Some license plates, such as Florida's, feature the address to the state's official or tourism website.

== Trends in serial formats ==
Visualization of the number of characters in license plate serial formats in the United States, based on current serial formats for passenger plates as of May 2021. The arrangement of the characters may vary. Random coding: Plates issued based on available numbers in non-sequential order. Coded issuance: Plates coded by month of expiration Coded issuance: Plates coded by county of issuance Sequential issuance: 6-character plate (1 letter, 5 digits) Sequential issuance: 6-character plate (2 letters, 4 digits) Sequential issuance: 6-character plate (3 letters, 3 digits) Sequential issuance: 6-character plate (4 letters, 2 digits) Sequential issuance: 6-character plate (based on blocks of alphanumeric combinations) Sequential issuance: 7-character plate (7 digits) Sequential issuance: 7-character plate (2 letters, 5 digits) Sequential issuance: 7-character plate (3 letters, 4 digits) Notes: Only the current passenger standard-issue serial format is depicted. Previous serial formats and optional issues are not depicted.; Florida uses six-character serial numbers, but the combinations vary. The most common issue consists of four letters and two digits, but alternate standard issues contain four digits and two letters.; Nebraska uses sequential-issuance three-letter, three-number plates for its most populous counties and county-coded plates for the rest of the counties consisting of 1 or 2 letters and up to 5 numbers.; Nevada issues three letter and three number plates for vehicles sold through dealers that require a new plate.; Tennessee issues three number and four letter plates for the "In God We Trust" plate.; Indiana plates are randomly issued with combinations of 3 numbers and either 1, 2, or 3 letters, while all "In God We Trust" plates have 3 letters and 3 numbers.

Formats for license plate numbers are consistent within the state. For example, Delaware is able to use six-digit all-numeric serials because of its low population. In a similar case, New Hampshire uses seven-digit all-numeric serials.

Several states, particularly those with higher populations, use seven-character serials. The most common example is ABC-1234 (with or without a space or dash), used in Georgia, Michigan, Mississippi, New York, North Carolina, Ohio, Pennsylvania, Tennessee, Texas, Virginia, Washington, and Wisconsin. Other examples of seven-character formats are 123ABC4 (formerly 1ABC234) in California; AB-12345 in Connecticut and Illinois; 1AB2345 in Maryland; and 1234ABC in Kansas. Many states have switched to seven-character serials after outgrowing their six-character formats, such as North Carolina in the 1980s and Connecticut in 2015.

States with lower populations typically use six-character serials with three letters and three numbers (such as ABC-123 or 123-ABC). These states are Alaska, Hawaii, Indiana, Iowa, Louisiana, Maine, Minnesota, Mississippi, Nebraska, New Mexico, North Dakota, Oklahoma, Oregon, South Carolina, and Vermont. Meanwhile, Arkansas, Colorado, Florida, and New Jersey have grown to adopt a format with two numbers and four letters. Arkansas uses ABC-12D; Colorado and Florida use ABC-D12; and New Jersey uses A12-BCD. Rhode Island and Washington, D.C. use two letters and four numbers; while Nevada uses one letter and five numbers. Arizona is unique in that its serials are based on blocks of six-character alphanumeric combinations.

== Serial coding ==
License plate numbers are usually assigned in ascending order from a starting point such as A00001. Typically, the numbers progress first, followed by the letters. In this example sequence, the second license plate would be A00002, the third would be A00003, and so on. After A99999 is issued, the next plates in line are B00001 to B99999, then C00001 to C99999, then D00001 to D99999, then E00001 to E99999, and so on. In most cases after Z99999 is reached, the positioning of the numbers and letters is flipped. Thus, the next plate in line would be 00001A, then 00002A, and so on. By adding an extra letter or number, more available combinations can be used. By observing the letters in a familiar license plate format, one can determine roughly when the plate was issued.

In a few cases, numbers have been assigned in descending order. For example, when Virginia switched to seven-character serials in 1993, numbers beginning with AAA-1000 were already in use for extra-cost, optional-issue plates. Therefore, the new standard license plates were issued in descending order from ZZZ-9999.

Delaware and Indiana issue plates randomly, based on which serials are readily available.

=== Expiration date ===
In some states, the month of expiration or the county of registration is incorporated into the plate's serial. The last number on a Massachusetts license plate indicates the month the vehicle's registration expires. For example, the plate 6RUW 17 would expire in July, the seventh month. "0" indicates an October expiration, while "X" and "Y" were formerly used for November and December respectively. In a West Virginia license plate, the first character indicates the month of expiration (1-9 for January to September; "O", "N", and "D" for October, November, and December). Missouri also blocks out its license plate serials by month, though this is done alphabetically instead of numerically.

=== County of issuance ===
In Alabama, Montana, Nebraska, South Dakota, and Wyoming, a one- or two-digit number representing the county of issue begins a license plate number. Standard-issue Idaho license plate numbers begin with a single-letter or a number-letter code representing the county of issue in alphabetical order. For example, vehicles registered in Ada County start with 1A, vehicles in Teton County start with 1T, vehicles in Twin Falls County start with 2T, and vehicles in Valley County start with V (since Valley County is the only county name that starts with a V). County codes have been based on historical population figures, the county names in alphabetical order, or some combination thereof. In Montana, for example, the county codes were assigned around 1930 and have not changed since. Other states like Indiana and Tennessee also once used the practice, before switching to a more conventional state-wide format.

Four jurisdictions in the United States use letters to designate a residence where a vehicle was registered. In Hawaii, the license plates have a unique letter designation based on the island counties that residents purchased or registered the vehicles from. A vehicle with a registration number beginning with H or Z is registered in Hawai‘i County, one beginning with K is registered in Kaua‘i County, one beginning with M or L is registered in Maui County, and one beginning with any other letter (and not containing H, K, L, M, or Z) is registered in the City and County of Honolulu. In the U.S. territory of Guam, the license plates use the first two letters that are coded by village of issuance. For example, "TM-1629" refers to a vehicle that was registered by a person who lives the village of Tamuning. In the U.S. Virgin Islands, a vehicle with a registration number beginning with C is registered in St. Croix, J in St. John, and T in St. Thomas.

Several states do require vehicles to display county codes, but these codes are not part of the serial. Indiana and Ohio display two-number county codes. Kansas plates display two-letter county codes, but these codes are placed on a sticker or are printed in the corner of the plate in a smaller font size. Texas places the county name only on the windshield registration sticker, where the car's license plate number is also printed. Florida, Georgia, Iowa, Kentucky, Mississippi, Ohio, and Tennessee place the full name of the county of registration explicitly on their standard-issue plates, although not as part of the serial. However, Florida allows its residents to choose either "Sunshine State" or "In God We Trust" in place of the county name. Georgia also allows its residents to choose from either the county name or the slogan "In God We Trust".

=== Skipping characters ===
For various reasons related to visibility and readability, some states and territories exclude certain letters from use in their license plate serial formats. The most commonly skipped letters are I, O, and Q. The primary reason for this is to avoid confusion with the numbers 0 (in the cases of O and Q) and 1 (in the case of I), especially when spacing is inadequate. Some states, such as Colorado, Georgia, and South Carolina have gradually adopted one or more of these letters over a course of years after previously skipping them in order to accommodate the demands of population growth and depletion of available serial combinations.

California only uses I, O, and Q in between two other letters, for example "7PIE123". Pennsylvania skips I, O, Q, and U entirely, and does not use A and E as the second letter (thus, MZZ9999 was followed by NBA0001). In addition to skipping I, O, Q, and U, Maryland has skipped E and F since 2023. New Jersey reserves the root letters T and X for trailer and commercial plates respectively. Tennessee and Texas skip all vowels; Texas also skips the letter Q.

In amateur radio license plate issues, some states use a unique slashed zero character in place of the standard "0" character. This is mostly done due to lack of spacing between the letters and numbers. Iowa began using a slashed zero on its standard issue plates in 2012; Alaska did so in 2023 and Pennsylvania did so in 2025. Another unique aspect of Pennsylvania's plates is that the number dies are noticeably taller and narrower than the letter dies. In Colorado, the "0" die is more rounded than the "O" die.

=== Persons with disabilities ===
In the states, special plates displaying the International Symbol of Accessibility are issued to persons with disabilities that entitle them to special parking privileges. Alternately, a placard, which in some jurisdictions can be hung from the rear view mirror, may be issued; the placard has the advantage of being transferred from vehicle to vehicle.

== Current standard-issue passenger plate designs and serial formats ==
The following tables give information on license plates currently being issued, with 2014 or later expiration dates, for private (non-commercial) use on passenger vehicles by the governments of the fifty U.S. states, the District of Columbia, the five inhabited U.S. territories, and Native American tribes. Information on serial numbering patterns is also given. Older designs and serial formats previously issued may still be valid for continued usage in certain jurisdictions; these are noted in a separate table below.

In addition to "regular" passenger plates, all jurisdictions also provide plates for other types of vehicles that may only be roughly similar in design and layout. Additionally, there has been an increasing trend in the field of "specialty" plates to promote specific causes or interests. To keep this table as simple as possible, most of these alternate types of plates will not be noted. More information may also be found within the individual articles for each state, as linked within the table. Exceptions to this guideline may be made for specialty plates that are available at no extra cost to the motorist, as these tend to be seen more commonly on the roads.

Current Table Format
Jurisdiction	Image	First issued	Type & slogan	Design	Plate style	Serial format	Notes
Alabama		January 3, 2022	Standard issue Heart of Dixie (in small print)	Bay and sky graphic with www.Alabama.travel at the bottom	Screened serial; Reflective sheeting	Numerically coded by county: 0AXXXXX (Note: Characters after "A" can be letters or numbers.); 00AXXXX	I, O, and Q are not used.
Alaska		January 2010 (embossed); January 2023 (printed using North Carolina's dyes)	Standard issue The Last Frontier	Blue on gold with state flag	Embossed serial; Reflective sheeting	ABC 123	I, O, and Q are not used.
American Samoa		2011	Standard issue Motu O Fiafiaga	Black on reflective graphic featuring Fatu Rock	Embossed serial; Reflective sheeting	1234	
Arizona		1996 (embossed); 2008 (screened)	Standard issue Grand Canyon State	Dark green on desert landscape	Screened serial; Reflective sheeting	XXX 1XX (2021-present) (Note: Order of progression: CEA 1DB. Arizona's "Alphabet Soup" format was introduced in 2020, after their antiquated computer systems were upgraded. Except for the fourth position, which is always a number, each position uses the letters A-Z first, followed by the numbers 1-9.); XXX1XXX (2020-2021) (Note: Order of progression: EFB1CDA. Early "Alphabet Soup" plates.); ABC1234 (2008-2020) (Note: Still used on rental car plates.); 123·ABC (1996-2008)	I, O, Q, and U are not used.
Arkansas		2006	Standard issue The Natural State	Black on a diamond background, representing Crater of Diamonds State Park in Murfreesboro	Embossed serial; Reflective sheeting	ABC 12D (2021-present); 123 ABC (2006-2021)	U and V were skipped until 2015. O and Q are still skipped.
California		1993 (modified in mid-2011) (Note: This baseplate originally did not include a slogan, except for 1998-2001 issues, which used the slogan "SESQUICENTENNIAL - 150 YEARS". The California DMV's web address has been used as the slogan since 2011.)	Standard issue dmv.ca.gov	Dark blue on white with red state name graphic and slogan printed in red at the bottom	Embossed serial; Reflective sheeting	123ABC1 (2026-present); 1ABC123 (1980-2026)	I, O, and Q are only used as the second letter.
Colorado		2000	Standard issue	Dark green on reflective white gray and green Rocky Mountains scene graphic; some versions have full color	Embossed serial; Reflective sheeting	ABC-D12 (2018–present); ABC-123 (2015–2018) (Note: Continuation of the 1982-1992 serial format. Serials progressed from QAA-001 to QZZ-999, then AQA-001 to ZQZ-999, then AAQ-001 to ZZQ-999. Some serials in the R series were issued concurrent with the Q serials. After the run of Q serials, the letter O was used in every position, with the same order of progression. This was followed by reissues of dormant serials in the A, B, C, and D series.); 123-ABC (2000–2015) (Note: In the original run of 001-AAA to 999-ZZZ, every letter except for Q was used. After 999-ZZZ was issued, Q was added to each position, starting with AAQ-001 to ZZQ-999 and AQA-001 to ZQZ-999, and ending with QAA-001 to QZZ-999.)	Q was skipped until 2013.
Connecticut		2000	Standard issue Constitution State	Dark blue on blue and white gradient fade; state shape on top left	Embossed serial; Reflective sheeting	AB•12345 (2015–present); 1AB•CD2 (2013–2015); 1ABCD2 (2013) (Note: The 1ABCD2 and 1AB•CD2 formats were temporarily used during a computer upgrade, which would allow Connecticut to use their current seven-character format.); 123•ABC (2000–2013)	I, O, and Q are not used in the current format. O was used in the 123•ABC format.
Delaware		1969	Standard issue The First State	Gold on navy blue	Screened serial; Reflective sheeting	123456 (variable number of digits)	Issued randomly.
District of Columbia		April 2017	Standard issue End Taxation without Representation; jurisdiction name displayed as "Washington, DC"	Blue on reflective white with red flag separator	Screened serial; Reflective sheeting	AB-1234	I, O, and Q are not used.
Florida		December 2003 (modified 2026) (Note: Baseplate originally had the upper slogan "myFLORIDA.com", though in 2026, this was changed to simply saying "FLORIDA".)	Standard issue Sunshine State	Green on reflective white with state map and citrus orange graphic in center	Embossed serial; Reflective sheeting	current: ABC D12 former: AB1 23C; 12A BCD; 123 4AB; 123 ABC; A12 3BC; A12 BCD; AB1 2CD; A12 34B; ABC 123	O is not used.
Florida		December 2003 (modified 2026)	Standard alternate issue County name (Not available in Miami-Dade County)	Green on reflective white with state map and citrus orange graphic in center	Embossed serial; Reflective sheeting	current: 12A BCD former: A12 3BC; 123 ABC; AB1 234; A12 BCD	O is not used.
Florida		October 1, 2008 (modified 2026)	Optional issue In God We Trust	Green on reflective white with state map and citrus orange graphic in center	Embossed serial; Reflective sheeting	current: AB1 2CD former: 123 4AB; A12 3BC	O is not used.
Georgia		May 2012	Standard alternate issue Peach State	Black on reflective white peach graphic in center; county name or "In God We Trust" sticker centered at bottom	Screened serial; Reflective sheeting	ABC1234	O is not used.
Georgia		May 2012	Standard issue	Black on reflective white	Screened serial; Reflective sheeting	ABC1234	O is not used.
Georgia		2026	Alternate issue 250 Year Anniversary Revolutionary War	Screened black on reflective graphic tan plate with state map on left, with US flag behind and 1776 overtop.	Screened serial; Reflective sheeting	ABC1DE; AB1CDE	O is not used.
Guam		February 27, 2009	Standard issue Tano Y Chamorro	Black on reflective white with gray latte stone and three red bougainvillea flowers at center	Embossed serial; Reflective sheeting	Coded by municipality of issuance AB 1234	
Hawaii		1991 (modified 2025)	Standard issue Aloha State	Black on reflective white with rainbow graphic	Embossed serial; Reflective sheeting	Coded by county of issuance: (Note: H and Z for Hawaiʻi County, K for Kauaʻi County, M for Maui County, and any other letter for Honolulu County.): ABC 123	I, O, and Q are not used.
Idaho		1991 (embossed) 2008 (screened) 2020 (current format)	Standard issue upper: Scenic Idaho lower: Famous Potatoes	Black on reflective white with red gradient and dark blue mountain scene	Screened serial; Reflective sheeting	Coded by county of issuance: current: A 1234U; A A123U; K AB12U; 0A 1234U; 0A A123U; 0A AB12U; 0A ABC1U; 10B 1234U; 10B A234U; former: A 123456 (variable number of digits following space); 0A 12345 (variable number of digits following space); 0A B1234; 0A BC123; 10B 1234; 10B A123	Ada County (1A) now uses V as the suffix letter, since they ran out of U-series plates. Canyon County (2C) uses a P suffix instead of a U.
Illinois		January 1, 2017 (embossed) 2023 (printed using North Carolina's dyes)	Standard issue Land of Lincoln	Reflective gradient blue-to-white with white Chicago and Springfield skyline and gray Abraham Lincoln graphic at far left; state name screened in black at top	Embossed serial; Reflective sheeting	AB 12345 (2017–present); AB1 2345 (2017)	I and O are not used.
Indiana		January 2017	Standard issue	Dark blue serial on reflective country scene graphic featuring a covered bridge; expiration date, year, county number and recycling symbol in corners clockwise from top left	Screened serial; Reflective sheeting	123A; 123AB; 123ABC	Issued randomly, with the serial tied to the owner.
Indiana		2012	Optional issue In God We Trust	Black on white with American flag graphic.	Screened serial; Reflective sheeting	ABC123	Issued randomly, with the serial tied to the owner.
Iowa		April 2018	Standard issue	Black numbers on reflective graphic plate with blue sky, white city skyline, farm and wind turbine, and green grass field; "IOWA" screened in white centered at top; county name screened in black centered at bottom	Screened serial; Reflective sheeting	ABC 123	
Kansas		August 2024	Standard issue To The Stars	Black on a light blue, white, and gold gradient plate with dark gray state-shaped border	Screened serial; Reflective sheeting	1234ABC	I, O, and Q are not used.
Kentucky		2020	Standard issue	Dark blue on light blue gradient with county name sticker below serial and state outline left of serial	Screened serial; Reflective sheeting	A1B234; ABC123	I, O, Q, and U are not used.
Kentucky		2020	Optional issue In God We Trust	Dark blue on light blue gradient with county name sticker below serial and state outline left of serial	Screened serial; Reflective sheeting	A1B234; ABC123	I, O, Q, and U are not used.
Louisiana		January 2025	Standard issue Sportsman's Paradise	Blue on white background with America 250 symbol in center	Embossed serial; Reflective sheeting	123 ABC (2016–present) (Note: Previously ABC 123)	
Maine		2025	Standard issue Vacationland	Blue on reflective white with a pine tree and north star graphic at left	Embossed serial; Reflective sheeting	123•ABC	I and O are not used.
Maine		2025	Optional issue Vacationland	As above, but without the tree and star graphic	Embossed serial; Reflective sheeting	123•ABC	I and O are not used.
Maryland		September 2016	Standard issue Maryland Proud	Black on reflective white with Maryland flag graphic	Embossed serial; Reflective sheeting	1AB2345	I, O, Q, and U are not used.
Massachusetts		1988	Standard issue The Spirit of America	Red on reflective white; state name and slogan screened in blue	Embossed serial; Reflective sheeting	Coded by month of expiration: (Note: 1 through 9 for January to September, and 0 for October. Vehicles registered in November and December are also given October plates. For this reason, October plates use a different format than January through September plates.) current: 1ABC 23; 123 A40; former: 123 ABC; 1234 AB; 12A B34; 123 AB4; 1AB 234; 12A 340	I, O, Q, and U are not used.
Michigan		2013	Standard issue upper: Pure Michigan lower: michigan.org	Blue on reflective white with blue wave at bottom	Embossed serial; Reflective sheeting	ABC 1234	I and O are not used.
Michigan		2024	Optional issue upper: Pure Michigan lower: Water Wonderland	White on green	Embossed serial; Reflective sheeting	12ABC3	I and O are not used.
Michigan		2021	Optional issue Water-Winter Wonderland	Maize on dark blue	Embossed serial; Reflective sheeting	1ABC23	I and O are not used.
Michigan		2014	Optional issue The Mackinac Bridge	White to yellow fade and blue with stylized Mackinac Bridge in background with black characters	Embossed serial; Reflective sheeting	ABC 123	I and O are not used.
Minnesota		June 2009	Standard issue Explore Minnesota.com, 10,000 Lakes	Black on reflective white with lake scene graphic	Screened serial; Reflective sheeting	123-ABC; ABC-123 (Note: Numbers and letters switch sides on a seven-year cycle.)	I, O, and Q are not used.
Mississippi		January 2024	Standard issue	Dark blue on white with magnolia blossom against a blue circle as separator	Embossed serial; Reflective sheeting	Coded by county of issuance: ABC 123	Letter O and number 666 are not used.
Missouri		October 15, 2018	Standard issue Show Me State	Dark blue on white with red and dark blue waves, light gray state seal, and dark blue "1821 * 2021"	Embossed serial; Reflective sheeting	Coded by month of expiration: AB1 C2D	I, O, and Q are not used.
Montana		January 2010 (current format started in 2025)	Standard issue Treasure State	White on blue with white state outline	Screened serial; Reflective sheeting	Coded by county of issuance: current: 0-AB1234; 00-AB123; former: 0-12345A; 00-1234A	I, O, Q, R, and V are not used.
Montana			Optional issues: Replica 1989 Centennial base Replica 1991 "Big Sky" base Replica 2000 base Replica 2006 "Big Sky Country" base	Blue on white with gold and maroon graphics	Screened serial; Reflective sheeting	ABC123	I, O, Q, R, and V are not used.
Montana			Optional issues: Replica 1989 Centennial base Replica 1991 "Big Sky" base Replica 2000 base Replica 2006 "Big Sky Country" base	Black on light blue gradient with multicolor state outline	Screened serial; Reflective sheeting	Coded by county of issuance: current: 0-AB1234; 00-AB123; former: 0-12345A; 00-1234A	I, O, Q, R, and V are not used.
Montana			Optional issues: Replica 1989 Centennial base Replica 1991 "Big Sky" base Replica 2000 base Replica 2006 "Big Sky Country" base	Black on light blue with blue and tan graphics	Screened serial; Reflective sheeting	Coded by county of issuance: current: 0-AB1234; 00-AB123; former: 0-12345A; 00-1234A	I, O, Q, R, and V are not used.
Montana			Optional issues: Replica 1989 Centennial base Replica 1991 "Big Sky" base Replica 2000 base Replica 2006 "Big Sky Country" base	Black on light blue gradient with multicolor state outline	Screened serial; Reflective sheeting	Coded by county of issuance: current: 0-AB1234; 00-AB123; former: 0-12345A; 00-1234A	I, O, Q, R, and V are not used.
Native American tribes		Varies	Varies	Varies	Varies	Varies	
Nebraska		January 2023	Standard issue	Dark blue on reflective white with the "Genius of Creative Energy" mosaic from the Nebraska State Capitol in the background; state name in dark blue at top	Screened serial; Reflective sheeting	Coded by county of issuance: 0-A1234 (variable number of digits following letter); 0-AB123 (following exhaustion of above format; variable number of digits following letter); 00-A123 (variable number of digits following divider); 00-AB12 (following exhaustion of above format; variable number of digits following divider); ABC 123 (used in Douglas, Lancaster, and Sarpy counties instead of the county-coded format)	I, M, O, Q, W and X are not used on the county-coded format.
Nevada		November 1, 2016	Standard issue Home Means Nevada	Black numbers and state-shaped separator on sky blue plate; stylized multi-colored mountain range at bottom; "NEVADA" screened in black serifed letters centered at top	Embossed serial; Reflective sheeting	current: 432·1A5; 345 A12; 12A 345 (Note: Continuation of the 123·ABC format after it was exhausted.); former: 123·ABC	I, O, and Q are not used.
New Hampshire		January 1999	Standard issue Live Free or Die	Green on Old Man of the Mountain graphic	Embossed serial; Reflective sheeting	123 4567 (2000–present); 123 456 (1999) (Note: Progressed backwards.)	
New Jersey		1992 (embossed with sticker boxes) 2007 (embossed without sticker boxes) 2014 (screened)	Standard issue Garden State	Black on yellow gradient fade, with state-shaped seperator	Screened serial; Reflective sheeting	D12-ABC (2010–present); ABC-12D (1999-2010); AB-123C (1993-1999); ABC1234 (1992-1993)	I, O, and Q are not used. The 'T' and 'X' series of serials are reserved for trailer and commercial plates respectively.
New Mexico		1989	Standard issue Land of Enchantment	Red on yellow with turquoise yucca graphics and red Zia sun symbol	Embossed serial; Reflective sheeting	123-ABC	I, O, Q, U, and V are not used.
New Mexico		2010	Standard alternate issue upper: Land of Enchantment lower: New Mexico USA	Yellow on turquoise with large yellow and red Zia sun symbol	Embossed serial; Reflective sheeting	ABC-123	I, O, Q, U, and V are not used.
New Mexico		2017	Standard alternate issue upper: Chile Capital of the World lower: New Mexico USA; Land of Enchantment	Yellow on black with green and red chile peppers at left	Embossed serial; Reflective sheeting	ABCD12	I, O, Q, U, and V are not used.
New York		2020	Standard issue Excelsior	Dark blue on reflective white with Niagara Falls, Adirondack Mountains, the Statue of Liberty, Manhattan skyline, and the Montauk Point Light on the bottom; state-shaped separator	Embossed serial; Reflective sheeting	ABC-1234	I, O, and Q are not used.
North Carolina		1982	Standard issue First in Flight	Blue on reflective white with Wright Flyer graphic	Embossed serial; Reflective sheeting	ABC-123 (1982–1985) ABC-1234 (Note: Second letter progresses strictly from A to M (previously N to Z).)	G, I, O, Q, and U are not used.
North Carolina		July 2015	Standard issue First in Freedom	Blue on reflective white	Embossed serial; Reflective sheeting	ABC-1234	G, I, O, Q, and U are not used.
North Carolina		July 2019	Standard issue In God We Trust	Blue on reflective white	Embossed serial; Reflective sheeting	ABC-1234	G, I, O, Q, and U are not used.
North Dakota		November 2016	Standard issue upper: Legendary North Dakota lower: Peace Garden State	Black on light blue gradient fade to sunrise with prairie scene and buffalo graphic	Screened serial; Reflective sheeting	123 ABC	
Northern Mariana Islands		1989	Standard issue Hafa Adai	Dark blue on white with seal in center	Embossed on screened serial; Reflective sheeting	ABC 123	
Ohio		2021	Standard issue Birthplace of Aviation	Dark blue serial on sunrise scene featuring a skyline, hills, river, wheat, field and a child swinging from the tree, with Wright Flyer, state shape and banner with slogan at top; county name sticker centered at bottom	Screened serial; Reflective sheeting	ABC 1234	I and O are only used as the second letter.
Oklahoma		September 2024	Standard issue Imagine That	Screened white serial with white star-shaped separator on reflective red plate, featuring smaller images screened in blue along the bottom	Screened serial; Reflective sheeting	ABC-123	
Oregon		1990	Standard issue	Dark blue on Douglas Fir tree and mountain graphic	Embossed serial; Reflective sheeting	123 ABC (2004–present); ABC 123 (1990–2004)	I and O are not used as the first letter.
Pennsylvania		May 2025	Standard issue Let Freedom Ring	Blue on white with Liberty Bell background	Embossed serial; Reflective sheeting	ABC1234	I, O, Q, and U are not used at all. A and E are not used as the second letter.
Puerto Rico		2023	Standard issue Isla del Encanto	Black on white with fort graphic, similar to the 1986 series	Screened serial; Reflective sheeting	ABC 123	
Rhode Island	Thumbnail-rhode-island-license-plate-design-5	January 2023	Standard issue Ocean State	Screened navy blue serial on reflective light blue plate with five-wave graphic; "Rhode Island" screened in navy blue centered at top; navy blue anchor screened at top left	Screened serial; Reflective sheeting	1AB 234	O is not used.
Rhode Island		2020	Optional issue upper: Beautiful Rhode Island lower: Ocean State	White on dark blue with the Reliance in the upper left corner	Screened serial; Reflective sheeting	1AB 234	O is not used.
South Carolina		January 2026	Standard issue Where The Revolutionary War Was Won	Black on white background with palmetto flag graphic on the left.	Screened serial; Reflective sheeting	123ABC	O was not used until 2023.
South Carolina		January 2016	Optional issue In God We Trust	Black on white with American and South Carolinian flags on the left.	Screened serial; Reflective sheeting	1234AB	O was not used until 2023.
South Dakota		January 2023	Standard issue Great Faces. Great Places.	Blue on Mount Rushmore graphic	Screened serial; Reflective sheeting	Coded by county of issuance: 0A1 234; 0AB 123; 00A 123	I, O, and Q are not used.
Tennessee		Late 2023	Standard issue The Volunteer State	Blue with "The Volunteer State" on the left and the outline of the state around "Tennessee" with county name sticker and the Tri-Star logo in the center	Screened serial; Reflective sheeting	ABC 1234	A, E, I, O, and U are not used.
Tennessee		Late 2023	Standard alternate issue upper: The Volunteer State lower: In God We Trust	Blue with "The Volunteer State" on the left and the outline of the state around "Tennessee" with county name sticker and the Tri-Star logo in the center	Screened serial; Reflective sheeting	123 ABCD	A, E, I, O, and U are not used.
Texas		July 2012	Standard issue The Lone Star State	Black on white with 5-point star in top-left corner	Screened serial; reflective sheeting	ABC-1234	A, E, I, O, Q, and U are not used.
Utah		Late 2007 (embossed); 2023 (printed using North Carolina's dyes) 2025 (screened) (Note: Utah's license plates going flat coincided with two other changes: they are no longer issued in pairs and the month and year stickers are consolidated into one.)	upper: Life Elevated lower: Greatest Snow on Earth	Dark blue on skier graphic	Screened serial; Reflective sheeting	A12 3BC	I, O, and Q are not used.
Utah		Late 2007 (embossed); 2023 (printed using North Carolina's dyes) 2025 (screened)	Life Elevated	Dark blue on graphic of Delicate Arch	Screened serial; Reflective sheeting	A12 3BC (Note: First letter progresses backwards from Z.)	I, O, and Q are not used.
Utah		2017 (embossed); 2023 (printed using North Carolina's dyes) 2025 (screened)	In God We Trust; United We Stand	Dark blue on white	Screened serial; Reflective sheeting	1ABC2 (2023–present); 1A2BC (2018–2023)	I, O, and Q are not used.
Vermont		1985	Standard issue Green Mountain State	White on green with small white tree in top left corner	Debossed serial; Reflective sheeting	ABC 123 (1990–present); 12AB3 (1989); 1AB23 (1988); 123A4 (1986–1987); 1A234 (1985)	I, J, O, Q, and U are not used. V and Z were also skipped until January 2024, starting with KPV 100.
U.S. Virgin Islands		March 1, 2023	Standard issue 175th Emancipation	Black on white with teal band at top, orange band at bottom	Screened serial; Reflective sheeting	Coded by island of issuance: (Note: C for St. Croix, JA for St. John, and T for St. Thomas); ABC 123 ABC 123 (St. John)	
Virginia		March 1, 2014	Standard issue Virginia is for Lovers	Blue on white	Embossed serial; Reflective sheeting	ABC-1234 (Note: Progresses backwards from ZZZ-9999, except for the V-series, which progressed forward from VAA-0001 to VZZ-9999.)	I, O, and Q are not used.
Washington		1987 (embossed); July 1998 (modified version, with slogan); October 2024 (screened)	Standard issue Evergreen State	Dark blue on white with light blue Mount Rainier graphic	Embossed serial; Reflective sheeting	ABC1234 (2010–present); 123-ABC (1987–2010)	I, O and Q are not used as the third letter.
West Virginia		July 2023	Standard issue Wild, Wonderful	Blue on white with state name in dark blue bar with state outline as separator	Screened serial; Reflective sheeting	Coded by month of expiration: (Note: 1 through 9 for January to September; O, N, and D for October, November, and December respectively.): X1A 2345; XAB 1234	
Wisconsin		June 2000	Standard issue America's Dairyland	Black on reflective white with stylized lake and farm graphic	Embossed serial; Reflective sheeting	ABC-1234 (2017–present); 123-ABC (2000–2017)	I, O, and Q are not used.
Wyoming		August 2024	Standard issue That's WY	Screened white serial and Bucking Horse and Rider on navy blue and gray graphic of the State Flag, red and white border around plate; "WYOMING" screened navy blue outlined in white centered at top	Screened serial; Reflective sheeting	Coded by county of issuance and vehicle type (1A or 1/0A): 1A-123A; 1/0A-123A; 1A-1234; 1/0A-1234	

== Plate types no longer issued but still valid ==
Plates with the following designs and serial formats are no longer being issued but may still be valid for use in certain instances. This table does not include year of manufacture registrations.

Jurisdiction	Image	Dates issued	Type	Plate style	Serial format	Status
Alabama		early 2007 – October 2013	Optional issue God Bless America; dark blue on American flag background	Screened serial; Reflective sheeting	AB12345; 12345AB	Being replaced upon expiration, October 2013 to October 2014.
Alaska		1981 – late 2004	"The Last Frontier"; blue on gold with state flag	Embossed serial; Reflective sheeting	ABC 123	Valid.
Alaska		late 1997 – late 2004	"Gold Rush Centennial"	Embossed serial; Reflective sheeting	ABC 123	Valid.
Alaska		January 2, 2008 – December 31, 2009	"Celebrating Statehood 1959–2009"; dark blue on mountain landscape background	Embossed serial; Reflective sheeting	ABC123	Valid.
Alaska		2018–2024	"Alaska Artistic License" plate featuring the northern lights	Embossed serial; reflective sheeting	ABC 123	Valid.
American Samoa	none					
Arizona		1980–1996	White on maroon	Embossed serial; Reflective characters on nonreflective background	ABC-123	Valid.
Arizona		1996–late 2007	Desert scene with embossed serials	Embossed serial; Reflective sheeting	123•ABC	Valid.
Arizona		2008–2020	As above but with screened serials	Screened serial; Reflective sheeting	ABC1234	Valid.
Arizona		2020-2021	As above but with screened serials	Screened serial; Reflective sheeting	Various	Valid.
Arkansas	none					
California		1963–1969	Yellow on black	Embossed serial; Non-reflective background	ABC 123	Valid.
California		1969–1980	Yellow on blue	Embossed serial; Non-reflective background	123 ABC	Valid.
California		1980 – January 1987	Yellow on blue	Embossed serial; Non-reflective background	1ABC234	Valid.
California		January 1983 – October 1987	"The Golden State"	Embossed serial; Reflective sheeting	1ABC234	Valid.
California		October 1987 – 1993	Blue on white with red embossed state name	Embossed serial; Reflective sheeting	1ABC234	Valid.
California		1993–1998	Blue on white with red screened state name	Embossed serial; Reflective sheeting	1ABC234	Valid.
California		1998–2000	"Sesquicentennial – 150 Years"	Embossed serial; Reflective sheeting	1ABC234	Valid.
California		2000-2011	As 1993-1998 base	Embossed serial; Reflective sheeting	1ABC234	Valid.
California		2011-2026	"dmv.ca.com"; old serial format	Embossed serial; Reflective sheeting	1ABC234	Valid.
Colorado		1977–1981	Embossed mountain scene	Reflective embossed serial; Non-reflective background	Coded by county of issuance: AB-1234; ABC-123; ABC1234	Valid for renewal, transfers no longer permitted. Serial may be retained and transferred to a new plate for a fee.
Colorado		1978–2000	Embossed mountain scene	Reflective embossed serial; Non-reflective background	Coded by county of issuance: AB-1234; ABC-123; ABC1234	Valid for renewal, transfers no longer permitted. Serial may be retained and transferred to a new plate for a fee.
Colorado		1992–1999	Embossed mountain scene	Reflective embossed serial; Non-reflective background	Coded by county of issuance: AB-1234; ABC-123; ABC1234	Valid for renewal, transfers no longer permitted. Serial may be retained and transferred to a new plate for a fee.
Connecticut	none					
Delaware			White on black		up to 12–345	Valid.
Delaware			Silver on black		up to 123456	Valid.
Delaware			Yellow on blue without slogan	Embossed serial; Reflective sheeting	up to 123456	Valid.
District of Columbia			"A Capital City"	Embossed serial; Reflective sheeting	123–456	Valid.
District of Columbia		1991 – November 2000	"Celebrate & Discover"	Embossed serial; Reflective sheeting	AB-1234 (1997–2000); 123–456 (1991–1997)	Valid.
District of Columbia		2001	Blue on reflective white with red flag separator and "www.washingtondc.gov"	Embossed serial; Reflective sheeting	BB-1234	Valid.
District of Columbia		2001 – July 2013	Blue on reflective white with red flag separator and "Taxation without Representation" with jurisdiction name displayed as "Washington, D.C."	Screened serial; Reflective sheeting	AB-1234	Valid.
Florida		December 2003 – early 2009	Green on reflective white with state map, citrus orange graphic, and myFLORIDA.com with county name	Embossed serial; Reflective sheeting	A12 3BC	Being replaced on a ten-year rolling basis.
Florida		December 2003 – 2006	Green on reflective white with state map, citrus orange graphic, and myFLORIDA.com with "Sunshine State" slogan	Embossed serial; Reflective sheeting	A12 3BC	Being replaced on a ten-year rolling basis.
Georgia		1997 – December 2003	"...on my mind"		123 ABC; 12345 QA; 1234 AB; 1234 ABC	Valid.
Georgia		December 2003 – May 2007	www.GEORGIA.gov		ABC 1234	Valid.
Georgia		May 2007 – May 2012	GEORGIA.gov		ABC 1234	Valid.
Guam			Black on reflective white with map graphic in center, "Tano Y Chamorro"		Coded by municipality of issuance: ABC1234 (variable number of digits following space); ABC123A (following exhaustion of above format)	Valid.
Hawaii	none					
Idaho		1991–2008	Dark blue on reflective white with red gradient and dark blue mountain scene, "Famous Potatoes"	Embossed serial; Reflective sheeting	Coded by county of issuance: A 123456 (variable number of digits following space); 0A 12345 (variable number of digits following space); 0A B1234 (following exhaustion of above format); 0A BC123 (following exhaustion of above format)	Valid.
Idaho		2008-2020	As above, but with serial screened rather than embossed	Screened serial; Reflective sheeting	Coded by county of issuance: A 123456 (variable number of digits following space); 0A 12345 (variable number of digits following space); 0A B1234 (following exhaustion of above format); 0A BC123 (following exhaustion of above format)	Valid.
Illinois		July 2001 – early 2017	"Land of Lincoln": red on blue gradient fade with Abraham Lincoln portrait graphic in center	Embossed serial; Reflective sheeting	AB1 2345 (2016–17); A12 3456 (2006–2016); 123 4567 (2001–2006)	Originally valid for 10 years, but new plates were not issued until January 2017.
Indiana	none					
Iowa		January 1997 – April 2018	Embossed blue, screened blue or screened black serial on reflective white skyline on blue background and black hand drawn farm scene foreground, screened "Iowa" in a small caps serif font and sticker with/or screened county name in uppercase in blue or black as the serial	Embossed or screened serial; Reflective sheeting	123 ABC except for "D" series and beginning of current ABC 123	Even though one of the 2017 license plate contestant plates lost the competition, it became a vanity plate, and the 1997 series plate is still valid.
Kansas		2018–2023	Ad Astra	Screened black serial on light blue and white graphic plate	123 ABC	Valid
Kansas		2023–2024	Ad Astra	Screened black serial on light blue and white graphic plate	1234ABC	Valid
Kentucky		August 2005 – September 2020	Dark blue serial on white and light blue gradient plate; screened blue and red Kentucky Tourism logo; "Bluegrass State", "Unbridled Spirit"	Embossed serial; Reflective sheeting	123 ABC; ABC 123	Valid.
Louisiana		1993–2001; 2004–2005	"Sportsman's Paradise" without pelican	Embossed serial; Reflective sheeting	ABC 123	Valid.
Louisiana		January 2002 – early 2004	"Louisiana Purchase Bicentennial 1803–2003" written in early 18th-century lettering and has the Louisiana Purchase Bicentennial logo as the separator	Embossed serial; Reflective sheeting	ABC 123	Valid.
Louisiana		2011 – 2012	"200 Years"	Embossed serial; Reflective sheeting	ABC123	Valid.
Louisiana		2014 – 2015	www.louisianatourism.com Bicentennial, Battle of New Orleans, 1815–2015 blue on reflective white with silhouette of Andrew Jackson on horse at left	Embossed serial; Reflective sheeting	ABC123	Valid.
Maine	none					
Maryland		February 1986 – early 2005	No slogan		1AB C23 (2004–2005); ABC 123 (1986–2004)	Valid.
Maryland		early 2005 – June 2010	www.Maryland.gov; Black on reflective white with state crest in center		1AB C23	Valid.
Maryland		June 2010-September 2016	www.starspangled200.org War of 1812 bicentennial commemoration plate		1A/B2345	Valid.
Massachusetts		1977-1993	Green on white (coded by month of expiration) "The Spirit of America" (coded by month of expiration)		123-456; 123-ABC	Valid. May be subject to replacement if found to be illegible during annual motor vehicle safety inspection.
Michigan		2007–2013	Optional issue "www.Michigan.gov"	Embossed serial; Reflective sheeting	ABC 1234	Being replaced on a rolling basis.
Michigan		2007–2021	Optional issue Spectacular Peninsulas	green and blue with Great Lakes outline on reflective white with black characters	1AB C23	Being replaced on a rolling basis.
Michigan		2013–2014	Optional issue The Mackinac Bridge yellow to orange fade and blue with stylized Mackinac Bridge in background with white characters.	Embossed serial; Reflective sheeting	ABC 123	Being replaced on a rolling basis.
Minnesota		2009–2017	Standard issue "Explore Minnesota.com; 10,000 Lakes"	Screened serial; Reflective sheeting	123-ABC	Being replaced on a seven-year rolling basis.
Mississippi	none					
Missouri	none					
Montana		2006–2009	Black on gray and white gradient with mountain graphic; "Big Sky Country"	Screened serial; Reflective sheeting	Coded by county of issuance: 0C-12345 (variable number of digits following divider); 0C-1234A (following exhaustion of above format; variable number of digits following divider); 0-12345A (variable number of digits following divider)	Valid if permanently registered.
Nebraska	none					
Nevada		1969–1984	White serial on blue plate with border line	Debossed serial; Reflective plate	Coded by county of issuance: A12345; AB1234; ABC123, 123ABC	Valid as long as both plates are still legible, can be remade upon request.
Nevada		January 2001 – mid 2017	Dark blue serial on mountain graphic against a yellow and orange gradient sky	Embossed: 2001–06; 2015–17; Flat: 2006–15	123·ABC; 12A·345	Valid.
New Hampshire	none					
New Jersey		1959–1969; 1970–1973	Black on tan, non-reflective, state abbreviated "N. J."	Embossed serial; Non-reflective plate	ABC-123	Valid.
New Jersey		1969–1970	As above, but with reflective sheeting	Embossed serial; Reflective sheeting	ABC-123	Valid.
New Jersey		1973–1977	Black on tan, non-reflective, state abbreviated "N. J."	Embossed serial; Non-reflective plate	123-ABC	Valid.
New Jersey		1977–1979	As above, but with state name spelled in full	Embossed serial; Reflective sheeting	123-ABC	Valid.
New Jersey		1979–1985	Buff on blue	Embossed serial; Non-reflective plate	123-ABC	Valid.
New Jersey		1985	Buff on blue	Embossed serial; Non-reflective plate	ABC-123	Valid.
New Jersey		1985–1992	Buff on blue	Embossed serial; Non-reflective plate	ABC-12D	Valid.
New Jersey		1992–1993	Black on yellow and white gradient, sticker boxes	Embossed serial; Reflective sheeting	ABC1234	Valid.
New Jersey		1993–1999	Black on yellow and white gradient, sticker boxes	Embossed serial; Reflective sheeting	AB-123D	Valid.
New Jersey		1999–2007	Black on yellow and white gradient, sticker boxes	Embossed serial; Reflective sheeting	ABC-12D	Valid.
New Mexico		1999–2010	Land of Enchantment hot air balloon	Embossed serial; Reflective sheeting	NM1234; 1NM234; 12NM34; 123NM4; 1234NM; AB 123; ABC123	Valid.
New York		2001–2010	Dark blue on reflective white with blue bars (upper blue bar has the state name over a skyline of Niagara Falls, the Adirondack Mountains, and New York City; lower bar includes the words "The Empire State" in white)	Embossed serial; Reflective sheeting	ABC-1234	Valid.
New York		2010–2020	Dark blue on reflective gold	Embossed serial; Reflective sheeting	ABC-1234	Valid.
North Carolina		2007–2009	Red on reflective white with blue and red graphics, "First in Flight"		ABC-1234	Valid.
North Dakota		2015–2016	Black on sunset sky graphic plate, "Legendary North Dakota"	Screened serial, Reflective sheeting	123 ABC	"North Dakota" font changed on current plates.
Northern Marianas Islands	none					
Ohio		2001–2003	red, white, and blue "Ohio Bicentennial"		AB12CD	Valid.
Ohio		2004–2010	dark blue on reflective white with state seal ("Sunburst") graphic and red and blue bars		ABC 1234	Valid.
Ohio		2009–2013	"Beautiful Ohio": dark blue on rolling hills with farm, distant skyline, and airborne biplane		ABC 1234	Valid.
Ohio		2013–2021	"Ohio Pride": embossed dark blue serial on word cloud background and red triangle resembling an airplane wing		ABC 1234	Valid.
Oklahoma		2017–2024	Black on blue and white graphic plate	Screened serial, Reflective sheeting	ABC 123	Valid.
Oregon		1956–1959	Gold on blue		1A-1234	Valid.
Oregon		1960–1963	Gold on blue with "Pacific Wonderland" slogan		1A-1234	Valid.
Oregon		1964–1974	Gold on blue		ABC 123 (A-M corresponds to January–December, skipping I)	Valid.
Oregon		1974–1988	Blue on gold		ABC 123 (A-M corresponds to January–December, skipping I; N and later series had no month correlation)	Valid.
Oregon		1988–1989	Blue on light green Douglas Fir tree and mountain graphic		ABC 123 (A-M corresponds to January–December, skipping I, N-series had no month correlation)	Valid.
Pennsylvania		1999–2004	Blue on blue, white and yellow gradient, "www.state.pa.us"		ABC-1234	Valid if retained by current owner on current vehicle. May not be transferred to new vehicle.
Puerto Rico		1986–2007	Standard issue Black on reflective white with Fortaleza graphic, "Isla del Encanto"	Embossed serial; Reflective sheeting	ABC 123	Valid.
Puerto Rico		2002–2003	Optional issue Black on reflective flag graphics, "Cincuentenario 1952–2002"	Embossed serial; Reflective sheeting	ABC 123	Valid.
Puerto Rico		2007–2023	Standard issue Black on reflective blue with Fortaleza graphic, "Isla del Encanto"	Screened serial; Reflective sheeting	ABC 123	Valid.
Rhode Island	none					
South Carolina		July 2008 – February 2016	Standard issue travel2sc.com black on orange, white, and blue gradient with palmetto tree in center	Screened serial; Reflective sheeting	ABC 123	
South Carolina		February 2016 – January 2026	While I Breathe, I Hope	Screened serial; Reflective sheeting	ABC 123; 123 ABC	
South Dakota	none					
Tennessee	none					
Texas		2009–2012	black on Davis Mountains and sky background with a lone star and streaks of red and blue in the upper-left corner	Screened serial; Reflective sheeting	AB1-C234	Valid.
U.S. Virgin Islands	none					
Utah		1972–1985	black on white	Embossed serial; Reflective sheeting	ABC 123; ABC-123	Valid.
Utah		1985–2008	blue on white with skier graphic, "Ski Utah!", and "Greatest Snow on Earth"	Embossed serial; Reflective sheeting	123 ABC	Valid.
Utah		1992–2008	dark blue on Delicate Arch background; "Centennial"	Embossed serial; Reflective sheeting	123 ABC	Valid.
Utah		2002	2002 Winter Olympics commemorative plate with snowflake logo above "Salt Lake 2002" and the Olympic rings; "Olympic Winter 2002"	Embossed serial; Reflective sheeting	123A4	Valid.
Vermont	none					
Virginia		1979–1994	dark blue on white with blue state name in sentence case	Embossed serial; Reflective sheeting	ABC-1234 (1994); ABC-123 (1979–1993)	Valid.
Virginia		1994 – July 2002; 2007 – February 28, 2014	dark blue on white with blue state name in all capital letters	Embossed serial; Reflective sheeting	ABC-1234	Valid.
Virginia		July 2002 – 2006	400th Anniversary	Embossed serial; Reflective sheeting	ABC-1234	Valid.
Virginia		2006–2007	Jamestown; America's 400th Anniversary	Embossed serial; Reflective sheeting	ABC-1234	Valid.
Washington	none					
West Virginia		December 2002 – early 2006	blue on reflective white with state name in dark blue bar, "Wild, Wonderful / www.callwv.com"	Embossed serial, Reflective sheeting	Coded by month of expiration: 0AB 123 (1 through 9 for January through September, respectively); ABC 123 (O, N, and D for October, November, and December, respectively)	Valid.
West Virginia		early 2006 – July 2023	blue on reflective white with state name in dark blue bar, "Wild Wonderful"	Embossed serial, Reflective sheeting	Coded by month of expiration: 0AB 123 (1 through 9 for January through September, respectively); ABC 123 (O, N, and D for October, November, and December, respectively)	Valid.
Wisconsin	none					
Wyoming	none					

== Diplomatic license plates ==
Diplomatic license plates are issued by the United States Department of State to accredited diplomats.

Prior to 1984 license plates for diplomatic vehicles were provided by the jurisdiction where the foreign mission was located. The District of Columbia provided license plates for missions headquartered in the capital, and New York provided plates for members of the United Nations, etc. Upon passage of the Foreign Missions Act in 1984 registration authority for foreign mission vehicles was centralized with the U.S. Department of State.

From 1984 until August 28, 2007, all plates issued followed the pattern of a letter identifying the status of the owner, followed by the two-letter country code, followed by a random three or four-digit number (S AB 1234). For member countries of the Organization of American States (OAS), a subset of that numbering pattern was allotted to vehicles based at those countries' missions to the OAS. Plates issued to cars based at the headquarters of the United Nations in New York City were issued in the reverse format, with the three or four-digit number first, followed by the two-letter country code, followed by the status code (1234 AB S).

The location of the status codes, either as the first or last character, allows the city of assignment to be easily identified because representatives of certain countries are limited to travel in a certain radius from their base. The status codes used until 2007 were "C" for Foreign Consul; "D" for Diplomat; "S" for Non-Diplomatic Staff; and "A" for the OAS. Status codes used for U.N. personnel until 2007 were "A" for the U.N. Secretariat; "D" for U.N. missions and diplomatic personnel; and "S" for U.N. Staff. The rights of the driver and car under diplomatic immunity are defined by this status code.

The country codes are unique to each particular country, but do not correlate to ISO Country Codes or other standards format. For example, in the system used until 2007, France is "DJ" rather than "F", and Australia is "XZ" rather than "AUS".

Diplomatic License Plates
Jurisdiction	Image	Dates issued	Type	Plate style	Serial format	Status
U.S. Dept. of State		1984 – December 31, 2008	Standard issue; red, white, and blue background with "DIPLOMAT", "CONSUL" or blank at top, and black serial centered on a white background	Embossed serial; Reflective sheeting	A AB1234; A 12345; 1234AA A 12345 A	Expired
U.S. Dept. of State		Unknown – December 31, 2008	Standard issue; red, white, and blue background with "DIPLOMAT", "CONSUL" or blank at top, and blue serial centered on a white background	Screened serial; Reflective sheeting	A AB1234; A 12345; 1234AA A 12345 A	Expired
U.S. Dept. of State		August 28, 2007 - Current	Standard issue; black serial on sky blue background, concave curved red top with the Dept. of State seal, "DIPLOMAT", "CONSUL" or blank at top center, and Office of Foreign Missions (OFM) logo	Embossed serial; Reflective sheeting	ABC 1234; A 123456; 1234 ABC; 123456 A	Valid

U.S. diplomatic plate country codes
Codes	Country or Organization
AA	Congo
AB	Taiwan (Issued with "E" status code)
AC	Ivory Coast
AE	Uzbekistan
AF	Japan
AH	Madagascar
AJ	Panama
AK	Cape Verde
AQ	Syria
AU	Uganda
AV	Israel
AW	African Union
AX	Marshall Islands
BL	South Africa
BV	Solomon Islands
BW	World Bank
BY	Solomon Islands
BZ	Iraq
CB	Cambodia
CC	Ethiopia
CE	Moldova
CG	Marshall Islands
CK	Namibia
CM	Micronesia
CN	International Organization
CS	Afghanistan
CT	Bhutan
CU	Botswana
CV	Myanmar (Burma)
CW	Cameroon
CX	Burundi
CY	China
DA	Colombia
DB	Costa Rica
DC	Cuba (UN only)
DD	Cyprus
DF	Dominican Republic
DG	Ecuador
DH	Ivory Coast
DI	South Africa
DJ	France
DK	Greece
DL	India
DM	Iran (UN only)
DN	Denmark
DP	Bangladesh
DR	Slovakia
DZ	Palau
FC	Soviet Union (discontinued)
FF	Antigua & Barbuda
FG	Central African Republic
FH	Ireland
FJ	Lebanon
FK	Kenya
FL	Liberia
FM	Libya
FN	Malta
FP	Morocco
FR	Philippines
FS	Netherlands
FT	Qatar
FV	Sri Lanka
FW	Vatican City
FX	Sierra Leone
FZ	Suriname
GC	Sweden
GD	Ukraine
GE	Azerbaijan
GG	Zambia
GM	Turkey
GN	Turkey
GP	Albania
GQ	North Korea (UN only)
GX	Vanuatu
GY	Chile
HB	Tonga
HD	Argentina
HL	Saint Lucia
HM	Andorra
HN	Mongolia
HV	Belgium
HW	Guatemala
HX	Benin
HY	Guinea-Bissau
HZ	Haiti
JB	Honduras
JC	Kuwait
JD	Mauritius
JF	Nigeria
JG	Portugal
JH	Somalia
JJ	Chad
JK	Turkey
JM	Unknown (seen in Friendship Heights in April 2022); Yugoslavia (discontinued)
JP	Tunisia
JQ	Togo
JS	Slovenia
JT	Croatia
JY	Cyprus
KB	Monaco
KD	Eritrea
KE	Georgia
KG	Equatorial Guinea
KH	Hungary
KJ	Lithuania
KK	Fiji
KL	Jordan
KM	Jamaica
KN	Gabon
KP	Luxembourg
KQ	Israel
KR	Malaysia
KS	Mexico
KT	Namibia
KU	São Tomé and Príncipe
KV	Saudi Arabia
KW	Seychelles
KX	Sudan
LC	Venezuela
LD	Vietnam
LG	Turkey
LH	Israel
LJ	Israel
LK	European Economic Communities
LM	Macedonia
LN	Saudi Arabia
LR	Bosnia-Herzegovina
LW	Germany
MF	International Monetary Fund
MG	United Kingdom
MK	Djibouti
ML	Diego Garcia
MN	Comoros
MP	Bahamas
MW	Maldives
NA	Oman
NB	Papua New Guinea
NC	Paraguay
ND	Romania
NQ	Angola
NX	Malaysia
PA	Austria
PB	Barbados
PC	Belize
PD	United Kingdom
PF	Bolivia
PG	Belarus
PH	Czech Republic
PI	Israel
PK	Norway
PL	Chile
PM	Brunei
PR	Argentina
PS	Zimbabwe
PV	Democratic Republic of the Congo
QA	Yemen
QD	Burkina Faso
QL	St. Kitts & Nevis
QM	Bulgaria
QN	Laos
QP	Latvia
QQ	Lesotho
QR	Malawi
QS	Mozambique
QT	New Zealand
QU	Nicaragua
QV	Niger
QW	Poland
QX	Pakistan
QX	Iran (DC only)
QY	Yemen
QZ	Indonesia
RB	Rwanda
RC	Saint Vincent and the Grenadines
RD	Senegal
RJ	African Union Mission (seen in DC 2017 park outside African Union Mission)
RL	Uruguay
RM	Unknown, Seen DC July 2013
RO	Romania
RQ	Unknown, Seen DC February 2011
RV	San Marino
SF	Czech Republic
SG	Israel
ST	Dominica
SX	Soviet Union (discontinued)
TC	Mali
TF	Algeria, Iraq (DC Only)
TG	Canada
TH	Egypt
TJ	Germany
TK	Liechtenstein
TL	El Salvador
TM	Iceland
TN	Nepal
TP	Mauritania
TQ	Mali
TR	Italy
TS	Iraq (UN only)
TT	Guyana
TU	Guinea
TV	Ghana
TW	Gambia
TX	Finland
TY	Grenada
TZ	Peru
UA	Bahrain
UF	Estonia
UH	Spain
UX	Trinidad & Tobago
VF	Thailand
VG	Tanzania
VH	Switzerland
VJ	Brazil
VK	Singapore
VL	Swaziland
VM	Nauru
WB	United Arab Emirates
WD	South Korea
WM	Samoa
WZ	United Kingdom
XA	Bangladesh
XC	Fiji
XD	Myanmar (Burma)
XE	Ghana
XF	Turkey
XG	Norway
XY	Ireland
XZ	Australia
YA	Armenia
YJ	Tajikistan
YK	Kazakhstan
YM	Moldova
YR	Russia
YT	Turkmenistan
YY	Kyrgyzstan
YZ	Azerbaijan

== See also ==
- Canadian licence plate designs and serial formats
