= Vehicle registration plates of the Dominican Republic =

Dominican Republic
- Country: Dominican Republic
- Country code: DOM

Current series
- Size: 300 mm × 152 mm 11.8 in × 6.0 in
- Serial format: None
- Colour (front): Black on white
- Colour (rear): Black on white

The Dominican Republic requires its residents to register their motor vehicles and display vehicle registration plates. Current plates are North American standard 6 × 12 inches (152 × 300 mm). The background and the first letter of the plate varies depending on the type of the plate.

== Passenger baseplates ==
The Dominican Republic issued a single plate to each vehicle twice a year. The 1st (1º) period of each year was 1 January to 30 June, and the 2nd (2º) period was 1 July to 31 December. The period number is shown on each plate, and the tables below shown these as either "1st" or "2nd" to differentiate the two plates. The colors of the two periods in each year were also different so it was easy to spot who had not paid the latest registration cost.

=== 1930 - 1939 ===
Image	First Issued	Design	Slogan	Serial format	Serials issued	Notes
	1930; 1st		None	1234		
1234	1930; 2nd	White characters on a blue background	None	1234		
1234	1931; 1st	White characters on a blue background	None	1234		
1234	1931; 2nd	Black characters on a light green background	None	1234		
1234	1932; 1st	Black serial number on a light blue background	None	1234		
	1932; 2nd	1932 plate validated with a large tab over the entire right 1/3 of the plate showing a white "2º 32" over "RD" on a red background	None	1234		
	1933; 1st		None	1234		
1234	1933; 2nd	Black characters on a yellow background	None	1234		
1234	1934; 1st	Black characters on a light green background	None	1234		
1234	1934; 2nd	White characters on a dark green background	None	1234		
1234	1935; 1st	Black characters on a white background	None	1234		
1234	1935; 2nd	Red characters on a yellow background	None	1234		
	1936; 1st		None	1234		
	1936; 2nd		None	1234		
	1937; 1st		None	1234		
1234	1937; 2nd	White characters on a dark blue background	None	1234		
	1938; 1st		None	1234		
	1938; 2nd		None	1234		
	1939; 1st		None	1234		
	1939; 2nd		None	1234		

=== 1940 - 1949 ===
Image	First Issued	Design	Slogan	Serial format	Serials issued	Notes
	1940; 1st		None	1234		
1234	1940; 2nd	Blue characters on a yellow background	None	1234		
1234	1941; 1st	Dark red characters on a cream background	None	1234		
	1941; 2nd		None	1234		
	1942; 1st		None	1234		
	1942; 2nd		None	1234		
	1943; 1st		None	1234		
	1943; 2nd		None	1234		
	1944; 1st		None	1234		
	1944; 2nd		None	1234		
1234	1945; 1st	Black characters on a gray background	None	1234		
1234	1945; 2nd	Black characters on a pink background	None	1234		
	1946; 1st		None	1234		
	1946; 2nd		None	1234		
1234	1947; 1st	White characters on a dark blue background	None	1234		
	1947; 2nd		None	1234		
1234	1948; 1st	White characters on a blue background	None	1234		
1234	1948; 2nd	Black characters on a pink background	None	1234		
1234	1949; 1st	Red characters on a gray background	None	1234		
	1949; 2nd		None	1234		

=== 1950 - 1959 ===
Image	First Issued	Design	Slogan	Serial format	Serials issued	Notes
	1950; 1st		None	1234		
	1950; 2nd		None	1234		
1234	1951; 1st	White characters on a red background	None	1234		
	1951; 2nd		None	1234		
1234	1952; 1st	Blue characters on a white background	None	1234		
1234	1952; 2nd	White characters on a green background	None	1234		
1234	1953; 1st	White characters on a black background	None	1234		
1234	1953; 2nd	Black characters on an orange background	None	1234		
1234	1954; 1st	White characters on a green background	None	1234		
	1954; 2nd		None	1234		
12345	1955; 1st	Green characters on a white background	AÑO DEL BENEFACTOR DE LA PATRIA	12345		Note that the beginning of five digit serial numbers in this year is approximate.
12345	1955; 2nd	White characters on a green background	AÑO DEL BENEFACTOR DE LA PATRIA	12345		
12345	1956; 1st	Green characters on a white background	None	12345		There is no slogan on this plate.
12345	1956; 2nd	White characters on a blue background	AÑO DEL BENEFACTOR DE LA PATRIA	12345		
	1957; 1st		None	12345		
	1957; 2nd		None	12345		
12345	1958; 1st	Green characters on a white background	None	12345		
12345	1958; 2nd	Red characters on a white background	None	12345		
12345	1959; 1st	Green characters on a white background	None	12345		
12345	1959; 2nd	White characters on a dark green background	None	12345		

=== 1960 - 1969 ===
Image	First Issued	Design	Slogan	Serial format	Serials issued	Notes
12345	1960; 1st	Blue characters on a white background	None	12345		
12345	1960; 2nd	White characters on a dark blue background	None	12345		
12345	1961; 1st	Black characters on a white background	ERA DE TRUJILLO	12345		
12345	1961; 2nd	White characters on a dark blue background	ERA DE TRUJILLO	12345		
12345	1962; 1st	Green characters on a white background	None	12345		
	1962; 2nd		None	12345		
12345	1963; 1st	Blue characters on a white background	None	12345		
12345	1963; 2nd	White characters on a dark green background	None	12345		
12345	1964; 1st	White characters on a light blue background	None	12345		
	1964; 2nd		None	12345		
	1965; 1st		None	12345		
	1965; 2nd		None	12345		
12345	1966; 1st	White characters on a black background	None	12345		
	1966; 2nd		None	12345		
12345	1967; 1st	White characters on a black background	None	12345		Plate size standardized to the North American standard from 1956 of 15 centimetres (6 in) in height by 30 centimetres (12 in) in width, with standardized mounting holes.
12345	1967; 2nd	Black characters on a light green background	AÑO DEL DESARROLLO	12345		
12345	1968; 1st	White characters on a red background	None	12345		
12345	1968; 2nd	Black characters on a yellow background	None	12345		
12345	1969; 1st	Red characters on a blue background; "PRIVADO" at top center	None	12345		
12345	1969; 2nd	Black characters on a light green background; "PRIVADO" at top center	None	12345		It is not known why there were so many different colors used during this period.
12345	1969; 2nd	Black characters on a yellow background; "PRIVADO" at top center	None	12345		It is not known why there were so many different colors used during this period.
12345	1969; 2nd	White characters on a blue background; "PRIVADO" at top center	None	12345		It is not known why there were so many different colors used during this period.

=== 1970 - 1979 ===
Image	First Issued	Design	Slogan	Serial format	Serials issued	Notes
	1970; 1st	Black characters on a creme background; "PRIVADO" at top center	None	12345		
12345	1970; 2nd	Yellow characters on a red background; "PRIVADO" at top center	None	12345		
	1971; 1st		None	12345		
12345	1971; 2nd	Black characters on a pink background; "PRIVADO" at top center	None	12345		
123-456	1972; 1st	White characters on a red background; "PRIVADO" at top center	None	123-456		
123-456	1972; 2nd	Black characters on a yellow background; "PRIVADO" at top center	None	123-456		
	1973; 1st	Black characters on a faded blue background; "PRIVADO" at top center	None	123-456		
123-456	1973; 2nd	Black characters on an orange background; "PRIVADO" at top center	None	123-456		
123-456	1974; 1st	Red characters on a blue background; "PRIVADO" at top center	None	123-456		
123-456	1974; 2nd	Black characters on a light green background; "PRIVADO" at top center	None	123-456		
123-456	1975; 1st	Black characters on a yellow background; "PRIVADO" at top center	None	123-456		
123-456	1975; 2nd	Maroon characters on a blue background; "PRIVADO" at top center	None	123-456		
123-456	1976; 1st	Black characters on a pink background; "PRIVADO" at top center	None	123-456		
123-456	1976; 2nd	Red characters on a white background; "PRIVADO" at top center	None	123-456		
123-456	1977; 1st	Dark green characters on a gray background; "PRIVADO" at top center	None	123-456		
123-456	1977; 2nd	Black characters on a yellow background; "PRIVADO" at top center	None	123-456		
	1978; 1st	Black characters on a white/gray background; "PRIVADO" at top center	None	123-456		
123-456	1978; 2nd	Red characters on a mint green background; "PRIVADO" at top center	None	123-456		
123-456	1979; 1st	Black characters on a yellow background; "PRIVADO" at top center	None	123-456		
123-456	1979; 2nd	Dark green characters on a pink background; "PRIVADO" at top center	None	123-456		

=== 1980 - 1989 ===
Image	First Issued	Design	Slogan	Serial format	Serials issued	Notes
	1980	Black characters on light green background; "PRIVADO" at top center	None	123 - 456		
123-456	1980; 2nd	White characters on a red background; "PRIVADO" at top center	None	123-456		
123-456	1981; 1st	Black characters on a pink background; "PRIVADO" at top center	None	123-456		
123-456	1981; 2nd	Dark green characters on an orange background; "PRIVADO" at top center	None	123-456		
P01-2345	1982; 1st	Black characters on a light blue background	None	P01-2345		
P01-2345	1982; 2nd	White characters on a dark blue background	None	P01-2345		
P01-2345	1983; 1st	Dark green characters on a white background	None	P01-2345		
P01-2345	1983; 2nd	Dark blue characters on a white background	None	P01-2345		
P01-2345	1984; 1st	Black characters on a light yellow background	None	P01-2345		
	1984; 2nd	Black characters on a light brown/gold background	None	P01-2345		
P01-2345	1985; 1st	Blue characters on a white background	None	P01-2345		
	1985; 2nd	Black characters on a very light green background	None	P01-2345		
	1986	Black characters on a turquoise blue background	None	P01-2345		
P01-2345	1986; 2nd	Black characters on a white background	None	P01-2345		
No image	1987; 1st	Black characters on a yellow background	None			
No image	1987; 2nd	White characters on a red background	None			
No image	1988; 1st	Dark blue characters on a white background	None			
	1988; 2nd	1st period 1988 plate validated by a blue on red sticker	None			
No image	1989; 1st	Red characters on a blue background	None			
	1989; 2nd	1st period 1989 plate validated by a black on yellow sticker	None			

=== Modern plates ===
Image	First issued	Design	Slogan	Serial format	Serials issued	Notes
	1990	Black characters on white background	None	123 - 456		
	1994	White characters on dark red background	None	123-456		
	1996 - 2003	Black characters on a white background	None	LA-B123		"L" is for a pickup truck; "G" is for a SUV
	2017	Black characters on white stripe in center and dark green stripe at top and light green stripe at bottom	"Exonerada Estatal Automovil" (Exempt State Automobile)	AB 01234		

== Other plate types ==
Image	First issued	Type & Design	Slogan	Serial format	Serials issued	Notes
	2018	Temporary plate; Black characters on a white background; expiration date handwritten below serial number; paper inside laminated pouch	None	X123456		
