= Vehicle registration plates of Panama =

Republic of Panamá
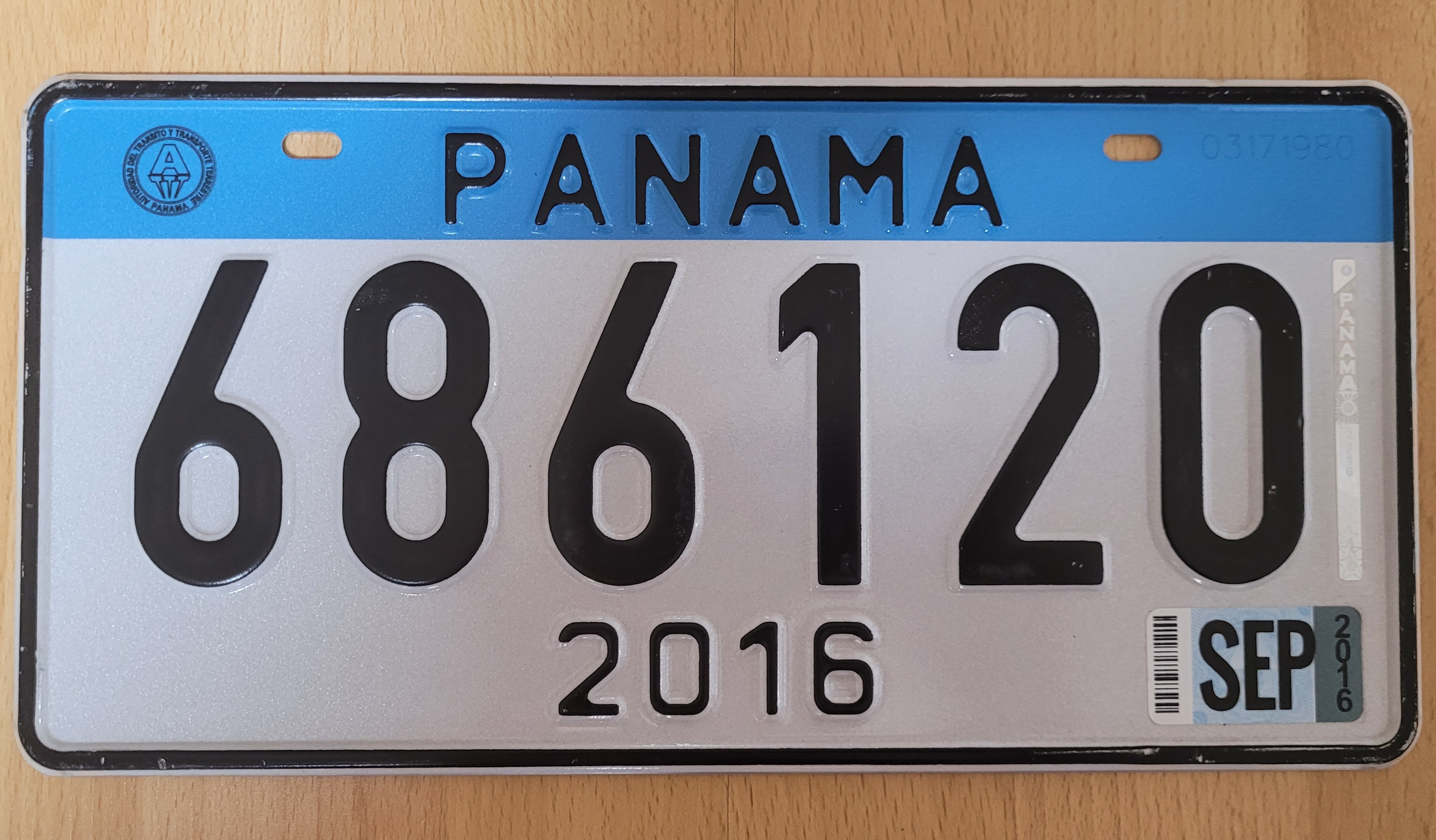
- A 2016 issued plate.
- Country: Panama

Current series
- Size: 12 in × 6 in 300 mm × 150 mm
- Serial format: AB1234; 123456 (for vehicles registered before 2013)
- Rear plate: Required
- Colour (rear): Black on white

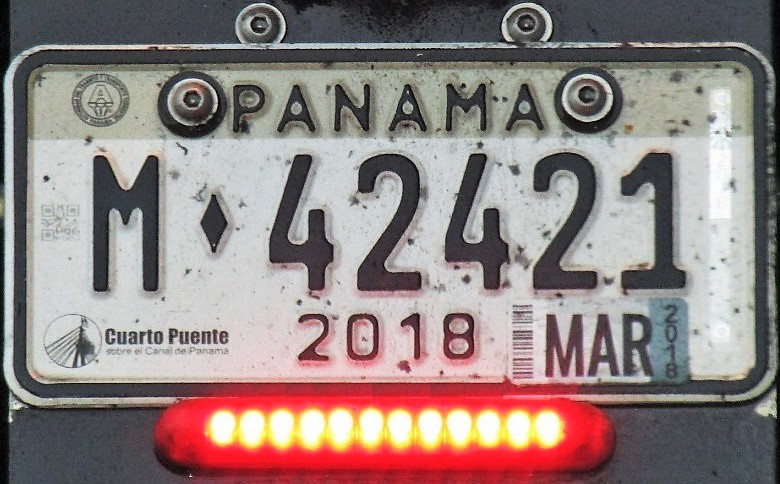
2018 motorcycle license plate

Panama requires its residents to register their motor vehicles and display vehicle registration plates. Current plates are North American standard 12 × 6 inches (300 × 152 mm).

All vehicles are required to display plates on the back of the vehicle. Front license plates are not required. Additionally, taxis in Panama are also required to display plates on the sides. This is done not with actual metal plates, but by a large decal of the license plate.

== 1925-1956 ==
Image	First issued	Design	Slogan	Serial format	Serials issued	Notes
	1942			12-345		

== 1957 to 2012 ==
Image	First issued	Design	Slogan	Serial format	Serials issued	Notes
	1968			A-12345		
	1977			1-23456		
	1985			1AB2345		
	1989			1-23456		
	1990			1A23456		
	1992			1-23456		
	1993			1-23456		
	1999			123456		
	2003			123456		
	2004			123456		
	2006			123456		
	2007			123456		
	2008			123456		
	2009 - 2012			123456		

== 2013 to 2021 ==
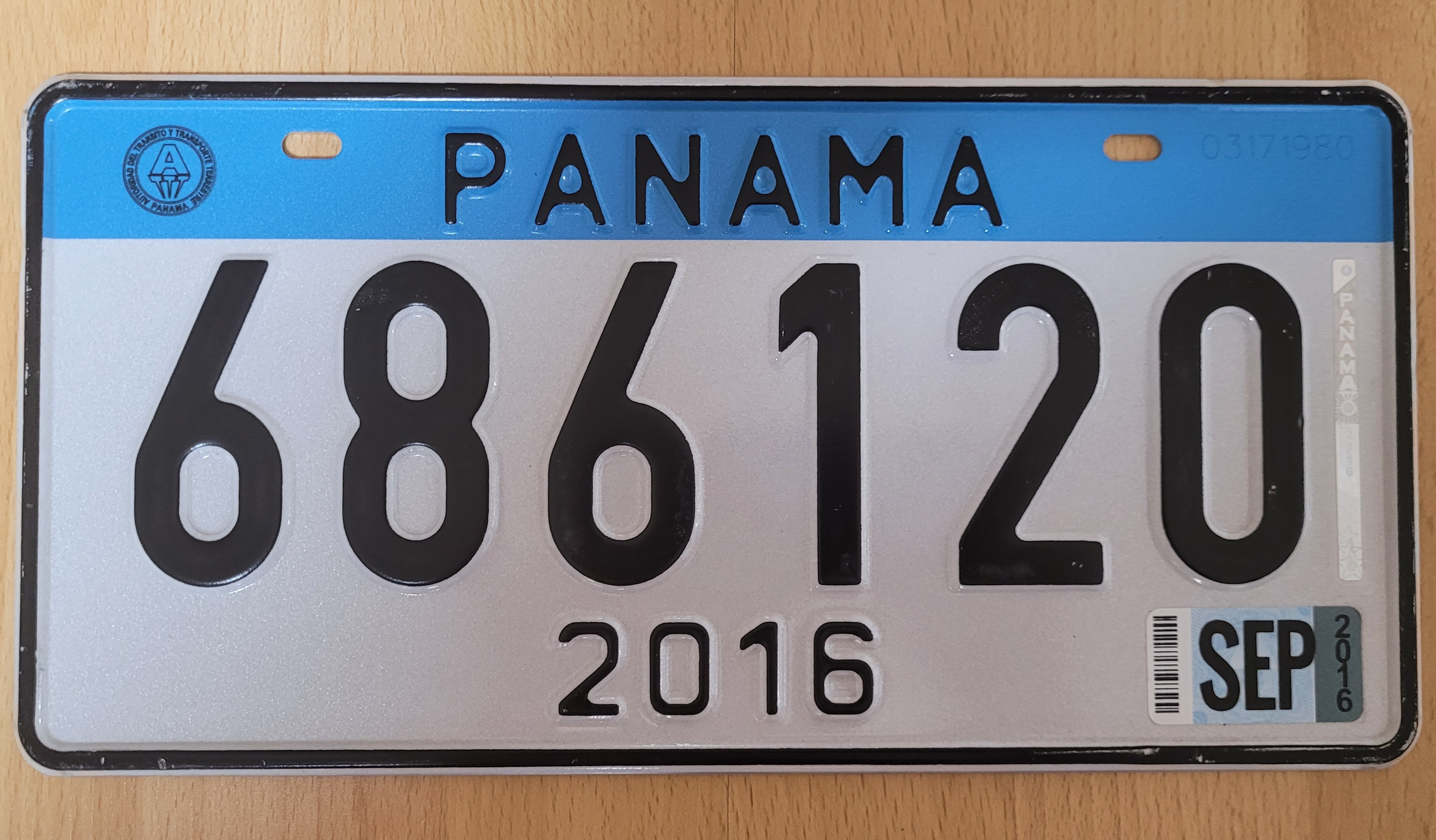
A 2016 Plate with a 123456 format

In 2013, the AB1234 format began being issued instead of the previous 123456 format. Plates that follow this format use the letter "M" for motorcycles, "T" for taxis, "B" for buses, "G" for government vehicles, and "D" for demo cars, and use the letters "MB" for Metro Buses, "MI" for international missions, "PR" for press, "BC" for school buses, "CD" for diplomatic corps, and "ADM" for non-diplomatic administrative staff. However, plates with the 123456 format were still issued for cars that were issued numbers before this change.

In 2018 a variant of FE-Schrift became the standard font used on plates.

== 2022 to present ==
In 2022, Panama switched from issuing new plates every year to instead issuing new plates every 4 years.

== Canal Authority plates ==
In 2000, when Panama gained control of the Panama Canal Zone, Licence plates for the Canal Authority began to be issued. All Canal Authority plates begin with the letters "CP".

Previously, Canal Authority plates follow standard plate designs, except for the province names being replaced by the text "Autoridad del Canal", until 2007 where "Panama" was replaced instead, as provinces were no longer displayed on plates.

In 2014, the Canal Authority plates were again changed for the final time to now display "Panama" at the top and include the letters "ACP" replacing the year at the bottom of the plate which is split and moved to the top corners.
