= Hook =

Tool used to grab onto, connect, or attach to something

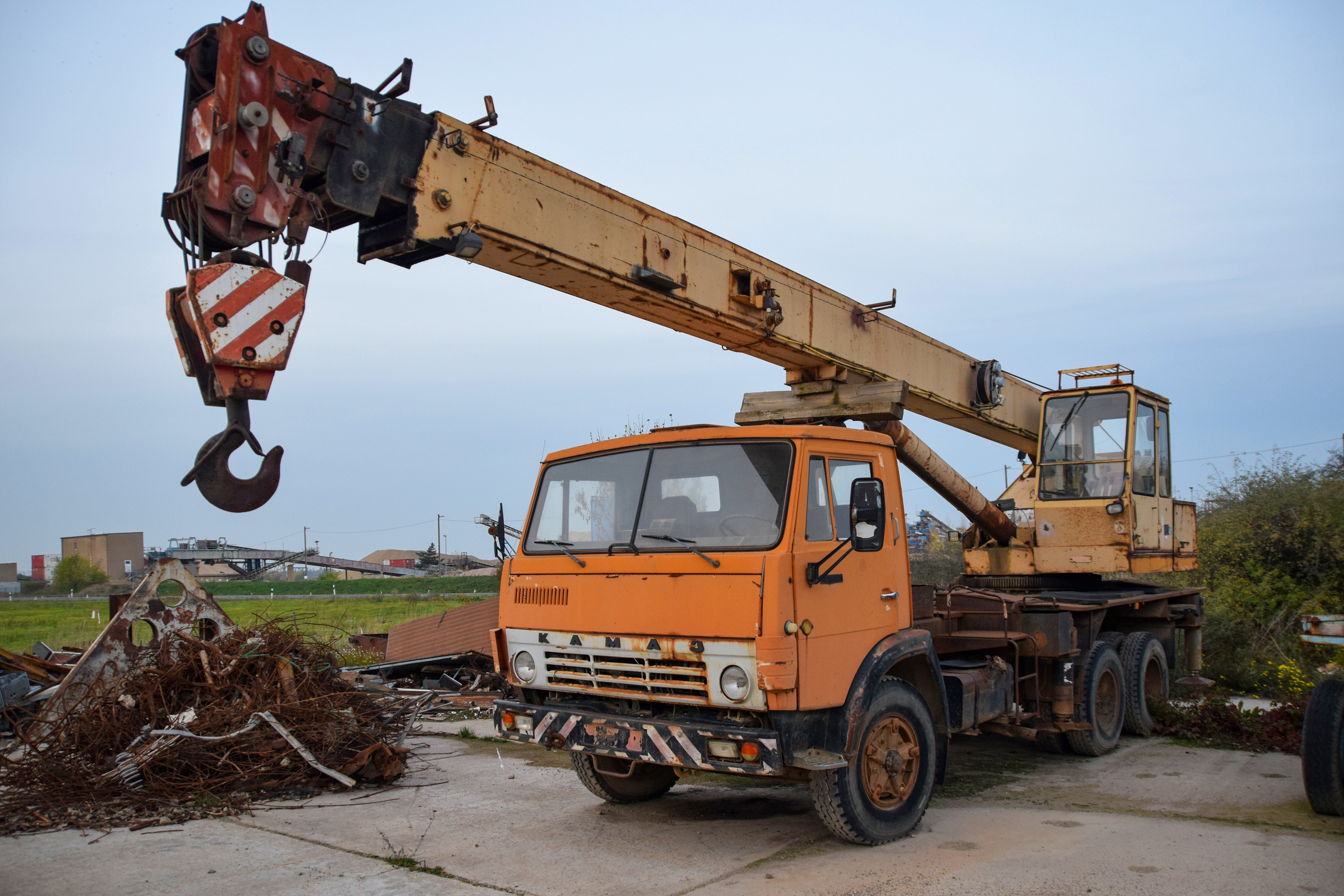
Lifting hook on a crane truck with a standard round hook and a gated opening

A hook is a tool consisting of a length of material, typically metal, that contains a portion that is curved/bent back or has a deeply grooved indentation, which serves to grab, latch or in any way attach itself onto another object. The hook's design allows traction forces to be relayed through the curved/indented portion to and from the proximal end of the hook, which is either a straight shaft (known as the hook's shank) or a ring (sometimes called the hook's "eye") for attachment to a thread, rope or chain, providing a reversible attachment between two objects.

In many cases, the distal end of the hook is sharply pointed to enable penetration into the target material, providing a firmer anchorage. Some hooks, particularly fish hooks, also have a barb, a backwards-pointed projection near the pointed end that functions as a secondary "mini-hook" to catch and trap surrounding material, ensuring that the hook point cannot be easily pulled back out once embedded in the target.

== Variations ==
- Anal hook, used in sexual bondage play
- Bagging hook, a large sickle or reaping hook used for harvesting grain
- Cabin hook, a hooked bar that engages into an eye screw, used on doors
- Cap hook, hat ornament of the 15th and 16th centuries
- Cargo hook, different types of hook systems for helicopters
- Clothes hook or "coat hook", hooks for storing garments, typically mounted on walls or vertical surfaces
- Crochet hook, used for crocheting thread or yarn
- Drapery hook, for hanging drapery
- Dress hook, fashion accessory
- Ear hook, to attach earrings
- Fish hook, used to catch fish
- Flesh-hook, used in cooking meat
- Grappling hook, a hook attached to a rope, designed to be thrown and snagged on a target
- Hook and chain coupler, mechanical part for the coupling for railway vehicles
- Hook (hand tool), also known as "longshoreman's hook" or "bale hook", a tool used for securing and moving cargo
- Hook-and-eye closure, a clothing fastener
- Hook-and-loop fastener, a type of textile fastener
- Hook hand, also called prosthesis, an artificial hand replacement made from a hook
- Lifting hook, for grabbing and lifting loads
- Mail hook, for grabbing mail bags without stopping a train
- Meat hook, for hanging up meat or carcasses of animals in butcheries and meat industry
- Prosthetic hook or transradial prosthesis, part of a prosthetic arm for amputees
- Purse hook, used to keep a woman's purse from touching the floor
- Shaker peg, used to hang up garments, bags, chairs, etc on a vertical surface
- Shepherd's hook, a staff used in herding sheep or other animals
- Siege hook, an Ancient Roman weapon used to pull stones from a wall during a siege
- Snook hook, a surgical tool used for the spaying of female animals
- Tailhook, used by aircraft to snag cables in order to slow down more quickly

== Gallery ==
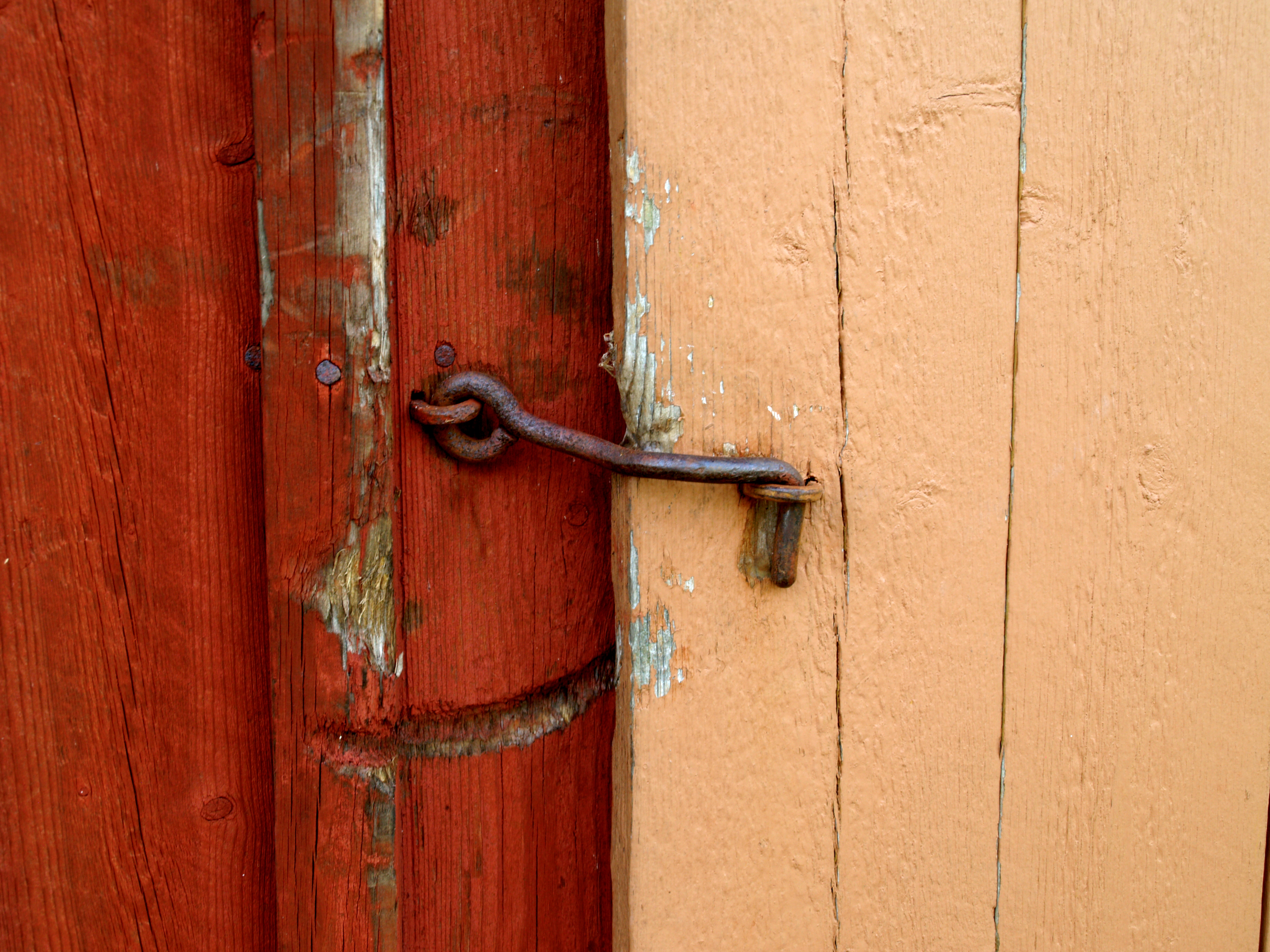
A cabin hook used as a latch for a wooden gate

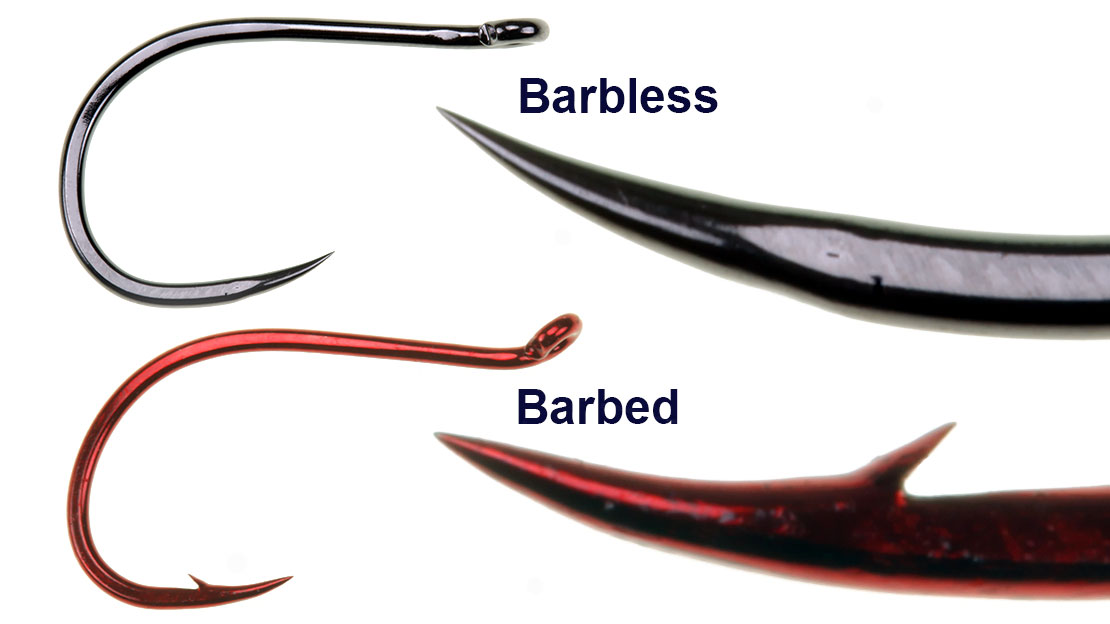
Fish hooks are pointed and often barbed to help catch and tether a fish's mouth

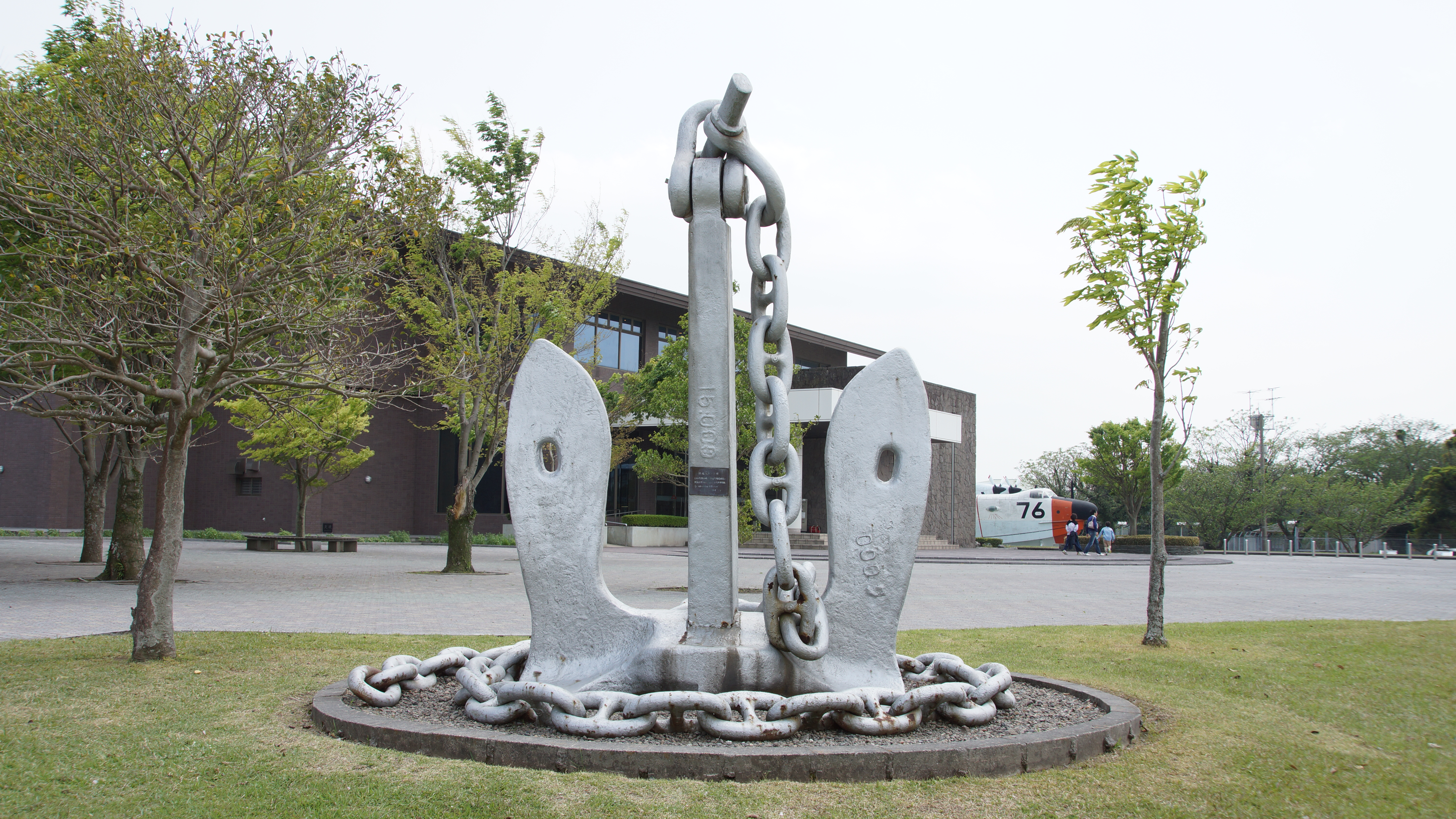
The main anchor of IJN battleship Hiei with the classic double-hook design

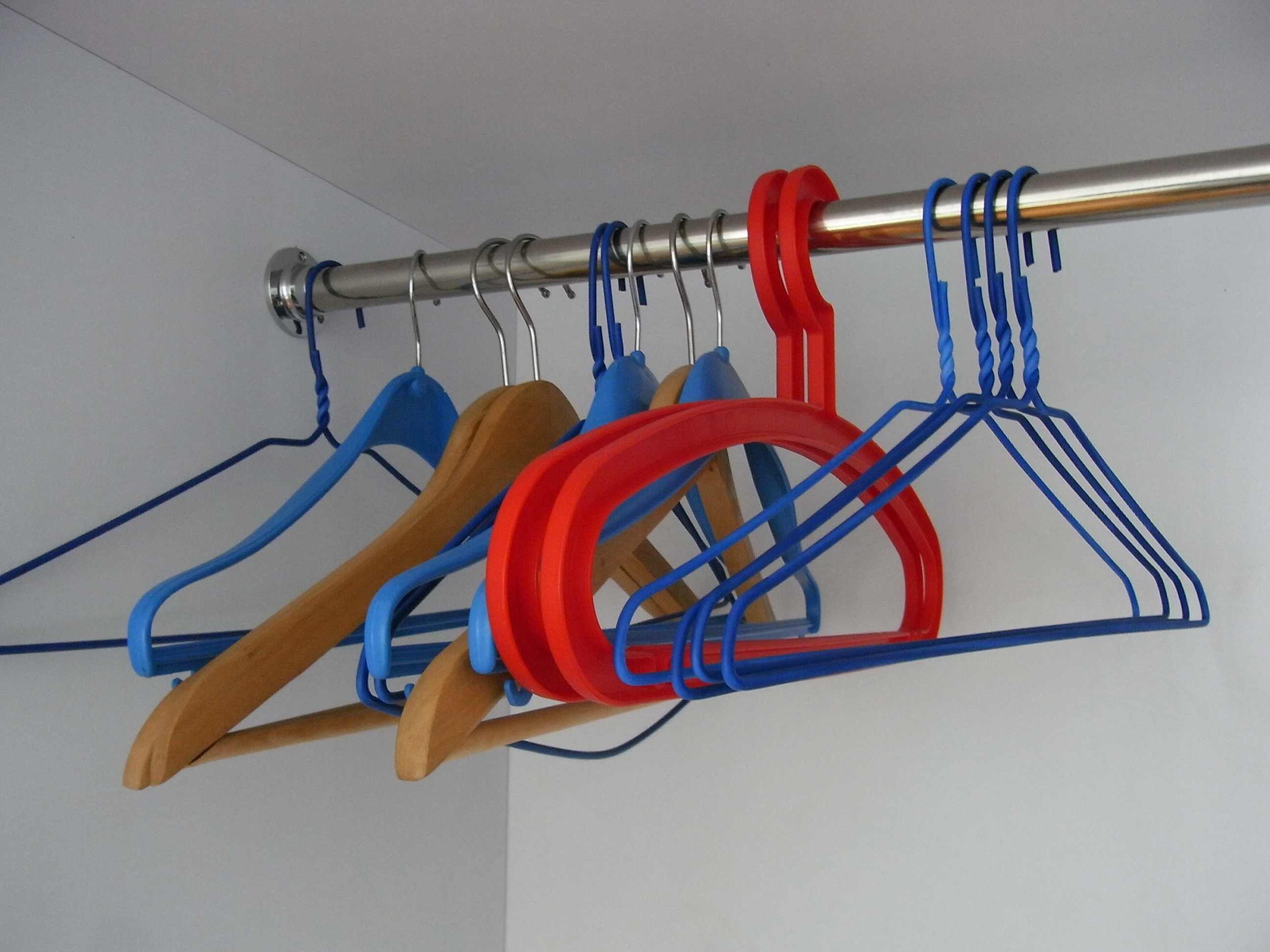
Clothes hangers with a top hook to hang onto a crossbar or a clothesline

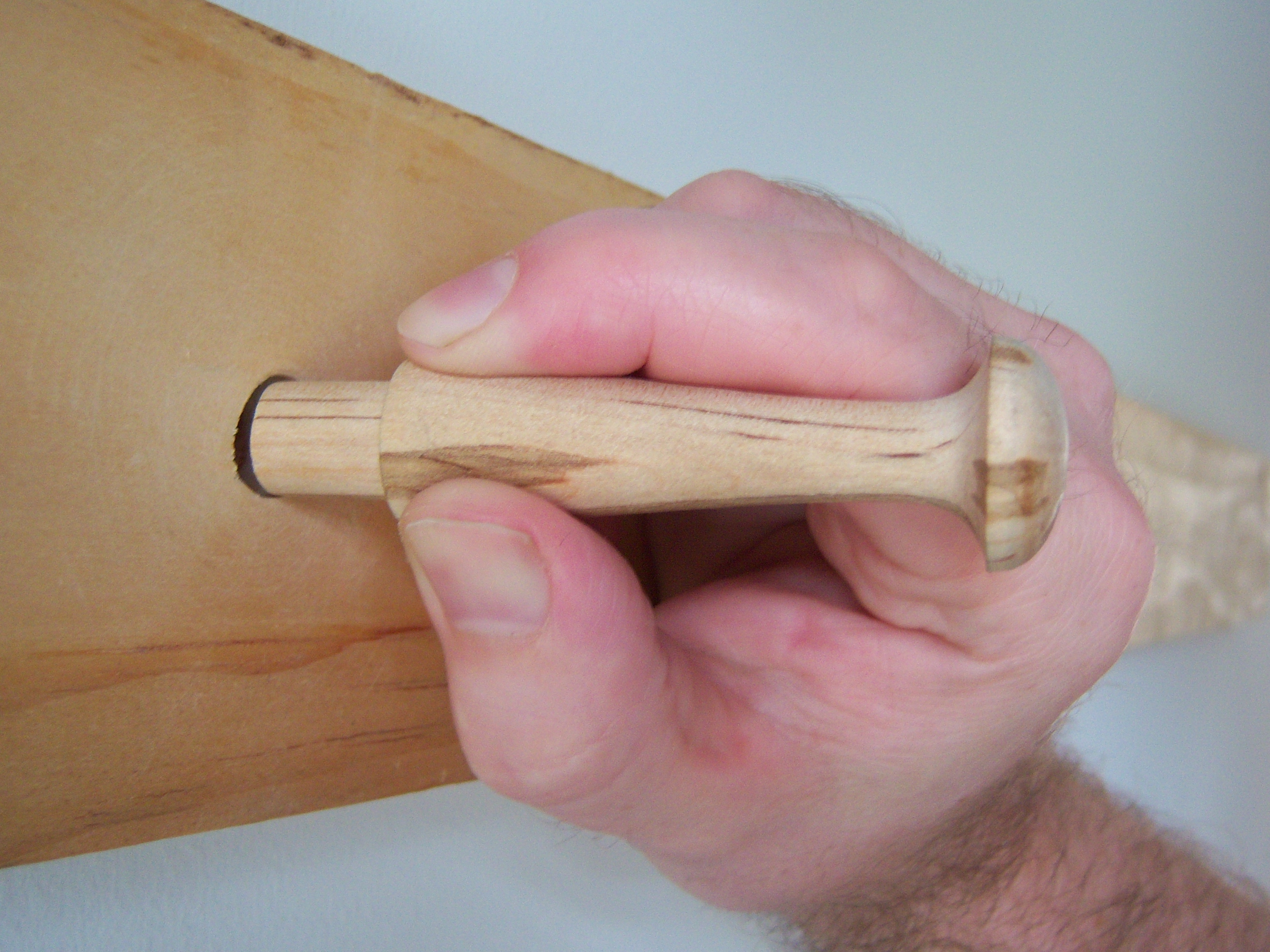
Installation of a Shaker peg

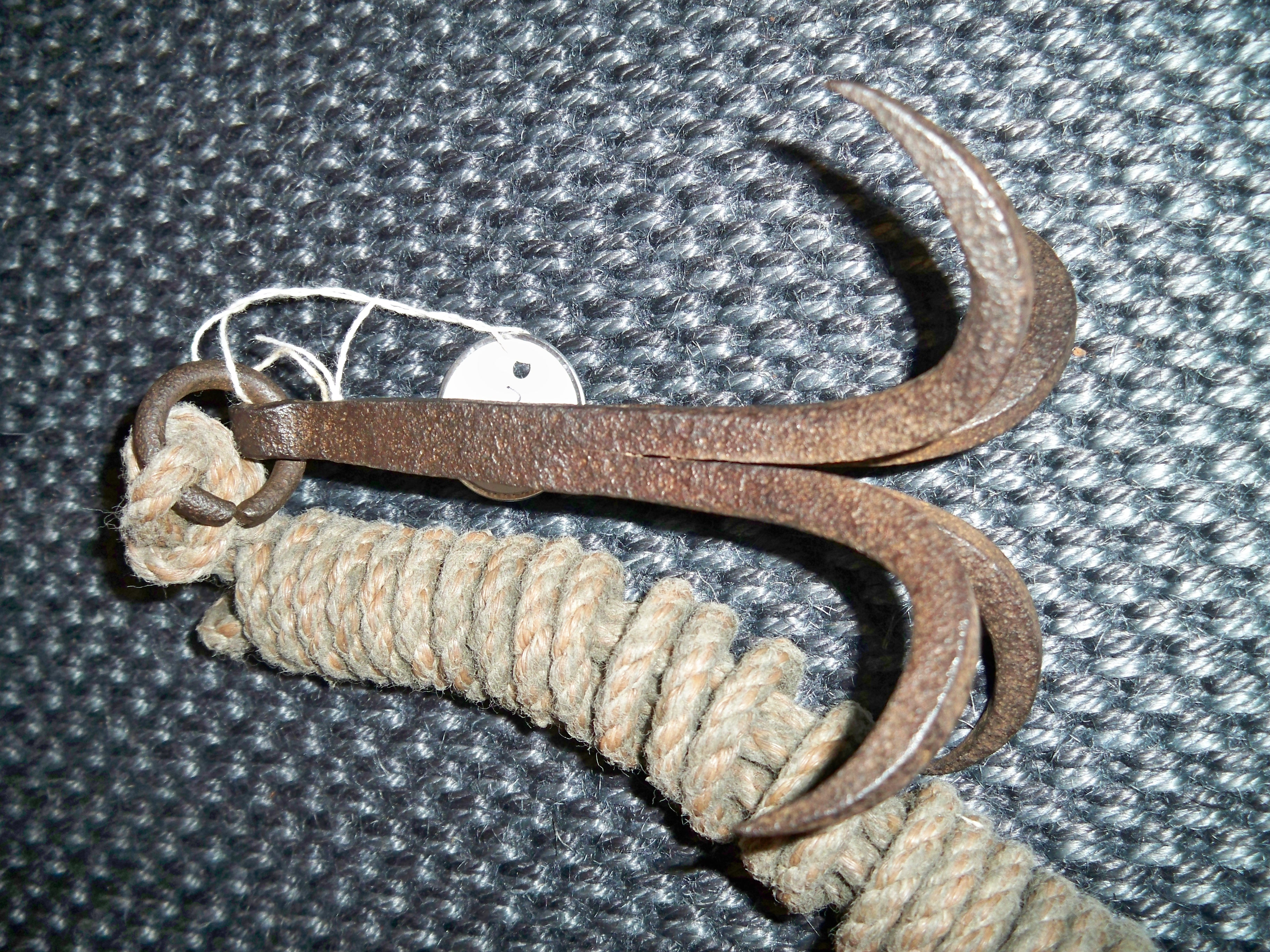
A grappling hook with multiple hooks to increase the chances of catching and anchoring onto a surface or an object

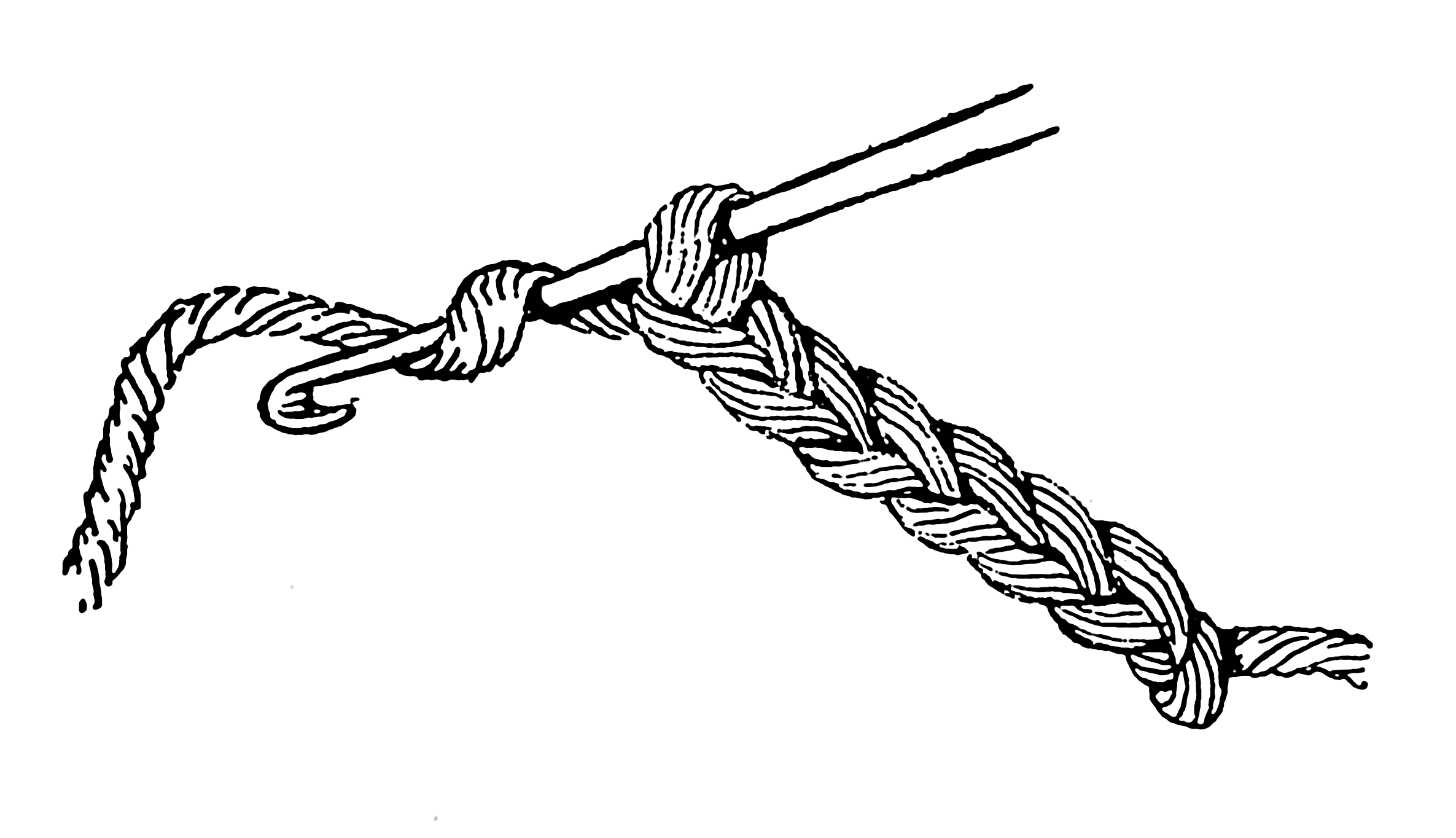
A crochet hook with a deep hooking groove near the tip, used to pull yarns during embroidery

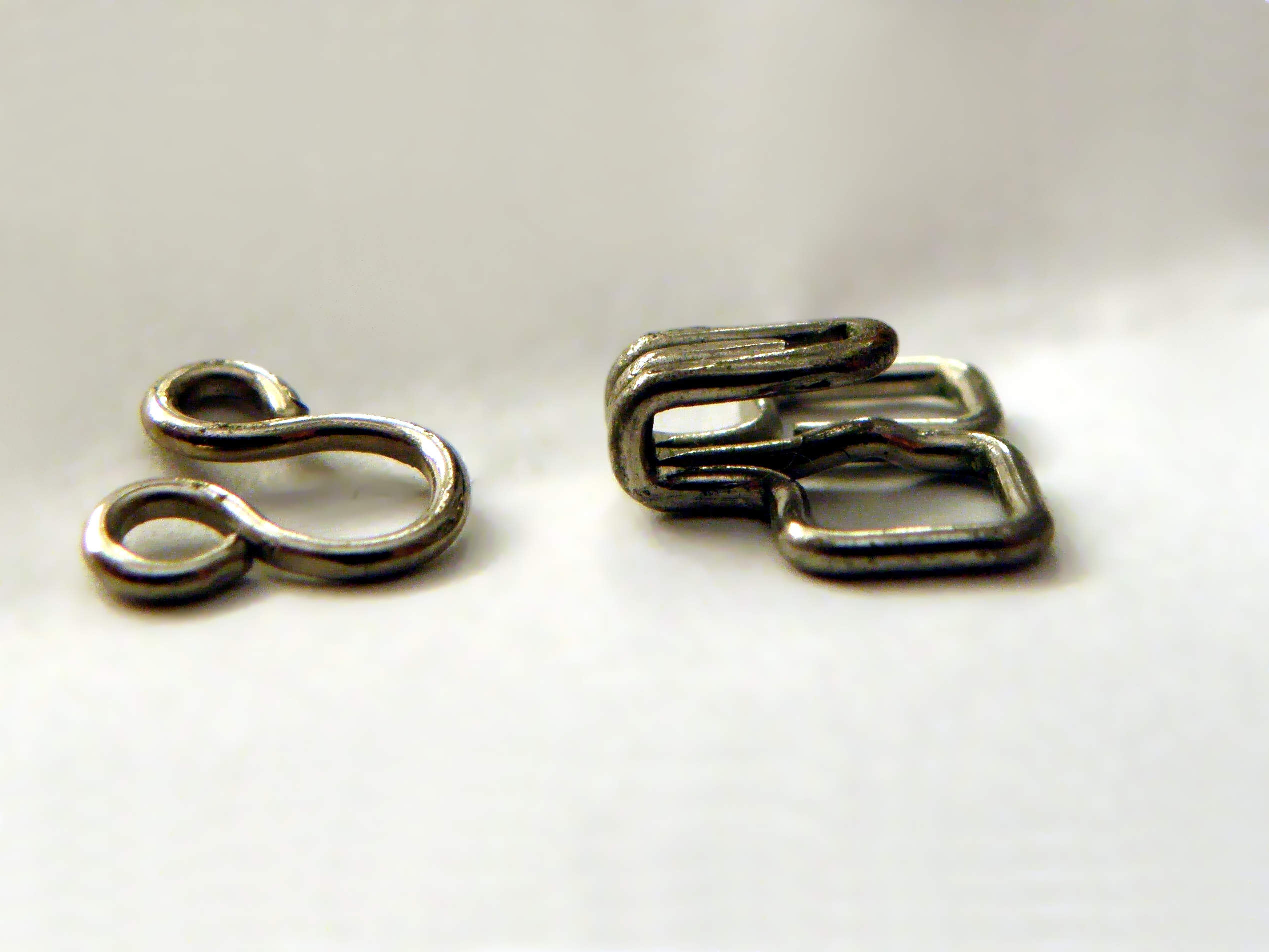
A hook-and-eye clasp is composed of two pieces that are sewn to clothing, one of which serves as a hook while the other as a staple

Golden pothook pictured in the coat of arms of Jäppilä
