= Levanta cola jeans =

Type of women's jeans

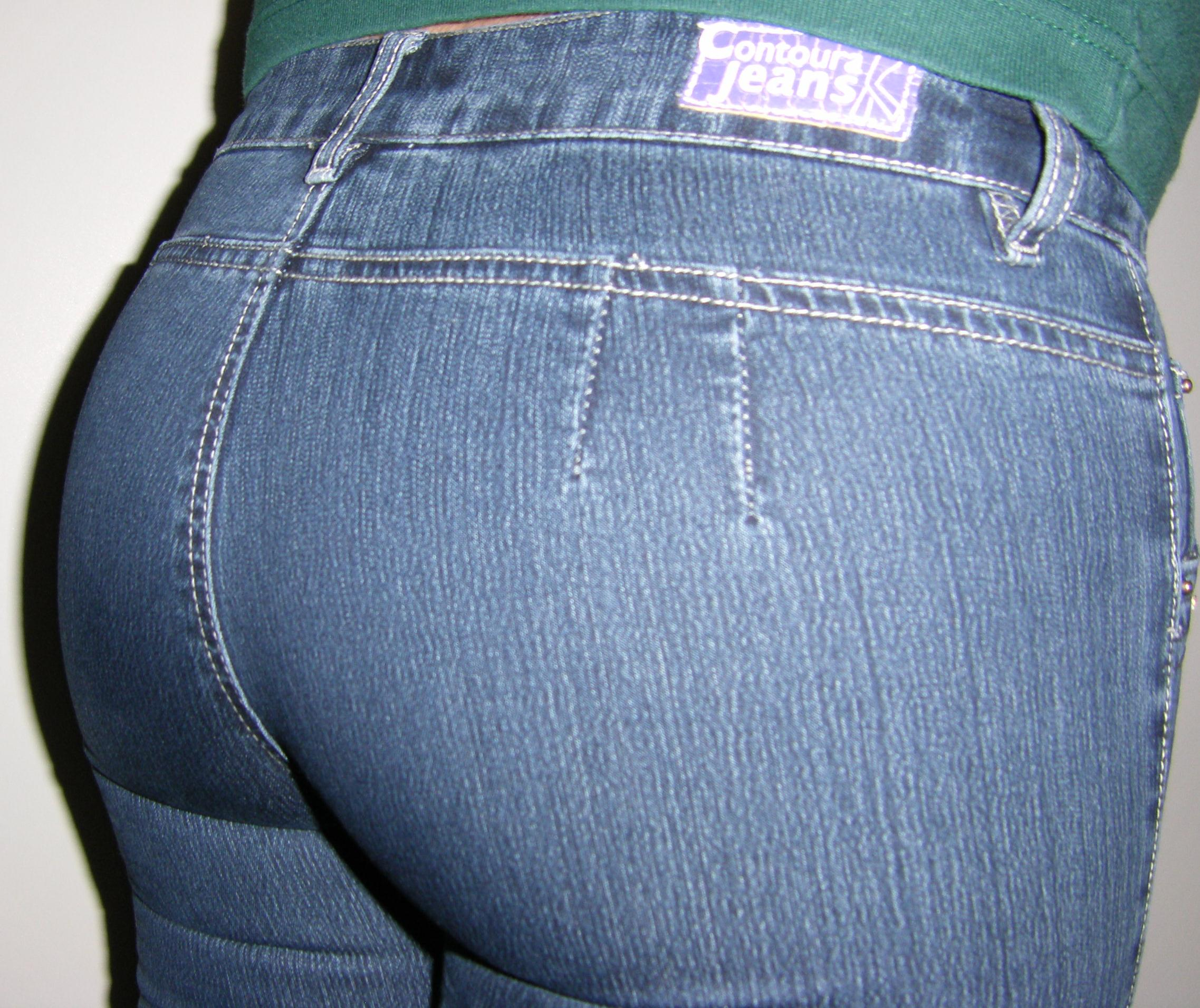
Levanta cola jeans

Levanta cola jeans (Spanish: jeans levanta cola, or "butt-lifting jeans") are women's jeans that enhance the buttocks. Originally developed in Colombia, they are especially popular among Latina women. Producers include YMI Jeans and others.

== Description ==
Levanta cola jeans are typically very stretchy and in essence leggings that are designed to look like jeans. They are typically made of spandex and other materials to fit to the body's contours. As a result, they have the external appearance of being much smaller than regular jeans before being worn. The jeans are tight around the waist and legs, but the fabric around the buttocks is looser to give the wearer a "butt-lifting" look. Many of the jeans do not have back pockets. The jeans are also sometimes highly decorated with rhinestones and glitter.

== History ==
Levanta cola jeans were first developed and produced in Colombia perhaps around the early 1990s. Gregorio José Rivera Quiroz was one of the first producers of these jeans. As a result, they are sometimes simply known in Spanish as jeans colombianos, or "Colombian jeans."

Colombia is the largest producer of levanta cola jeans. The jeans are most popular in Latin America (especially Mexico, Brazil, Peru and other neighboring countries) and the United States. Since the 2000s, they have also been gaining popularity in Europe and other parts of the world.

== See also ==
- Mom jeans
- Slim-fit jeans
- High rise
- Wide-leg jeans
- Daisy Dukes
- Denim skirt
- Designer jeans
- Drainpipe jeans
- Women and trousers
