= Back button =

Back button may refer to:

- Back button (web browser), a common web browser feature that retrieves the previous resource
- Backspace key, the computer keyboard key that deletes the character(s) to the left of the cursor.
- Back closure, a means for fastening a garment at the rear
