= Mom jeans =

High-waisted women's jeans

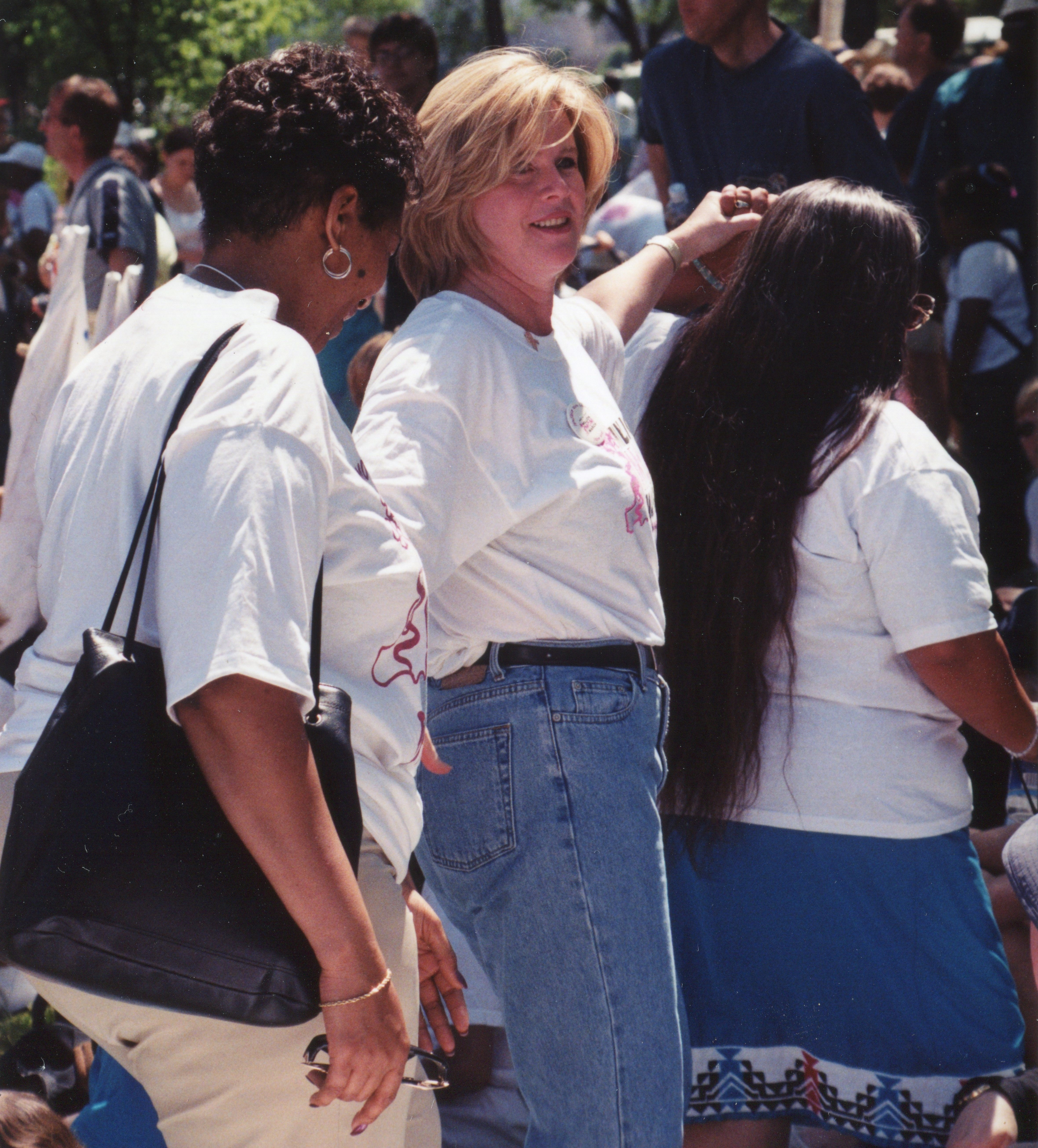
Then-Second Lady of the United States Tipper Gore (center) wears a pair of "mom jeans" at the Million Mom March protest

Mom jeans is an informal term for high-waisted women's jeans that were first fashionable in the late 1980s and early 1990s. In the late 1990s and 2000s they were mainly worn by adult American women and considered "old" by younger women. High rise, ankle length "mom jeans" have since become fashionable again in the 2010s and into the 2020s with younger women from tween and teen aged girls, on up through college aged women and beyond.

Many women wear their t-shirt, sweatshirt, sweater or other top tucked into the jeans with a belt to complete the look.

Once considered a pejorative term, mom jeans gained prominence from a May 2003 Saturday Night Live skit written by Tina Fey for a fake brand of jeans called Mom Jeans, which used the tagline: "For this Mother's Day, don't give Mom that bottle of perfume. Give her something that says, 'I'm not a woman anymore... I'm a mom.'"

== Characteristics ==
This style of mom jeans usually consists of a high waist rising above the navel, making the buttocks appear disproportionately longer, larger, and flatter. Mom jeans have excess space in the zipper, crotch, and leg areas.

Other attributes of the style often seen are pleats, tapered legs, ankle length legs, and elastic waistbands. The color is usually light wash. Mom jeans are often worn with a blouse, t-shirt, sweatshirt, sweater or other shirt or bodysuit that is tucked into the jeans. Often a belt is worn.

== Dad jeans ==
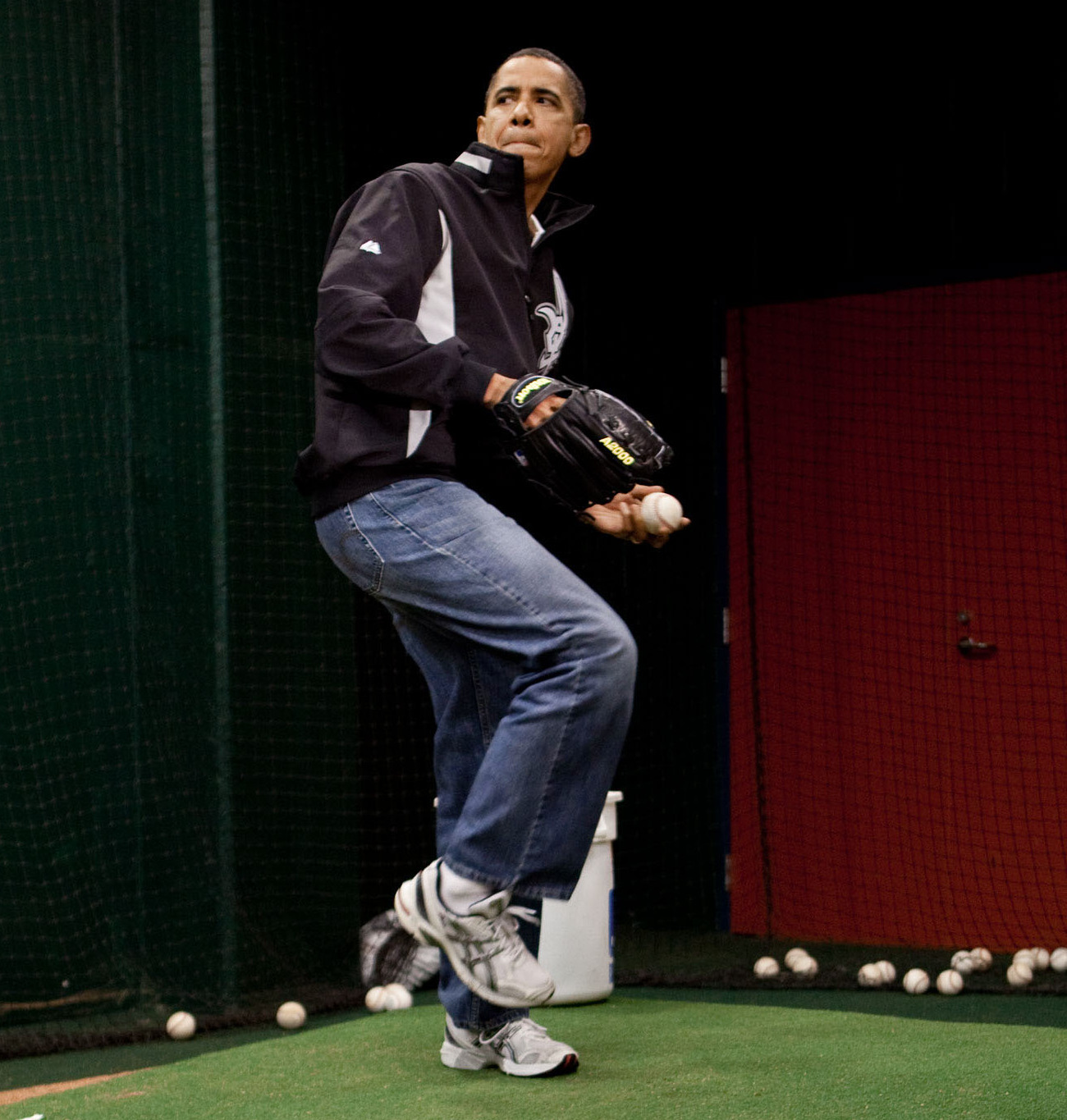
Barack Obama practices pitching wearing "dad jeans" in advance of throwing the ceremonial first pitch at the 2009 MLB All-Star Game

A corresponding term, dad jeans, has been coined in popular media to refer to high-waisted jeans often worn by middle-aged American men. The term gained popularity in 2009 when President Barack Obama wore high-waisted jeans during the 2009 Major League Baseball All-Star Game. In March 2015, Obama appeared on Jimmy Kimmel Live! for the "Mean Tweets" segment, in which he read a tweet mocking him over the jeans. Jimmy Kimmel then appeared on stage wearing high-waisted jeans, and jokingly attempted to defend them.

However, the term dad jeans gained less media attention than the corresponding feminine term. The term is also used to refer to both high-waisted and mid-waisted jeans worn by men, as high-waisted trousers lost popularity among men as early as the mid to late 1960s.

== See also ==
- Slim-fit jeans
- High rise
- Wide-leg jeans
- Daisy Dukes
- Denim skirt
- Designer jeans
- Drainpipe jeans
- Women and trousers
