= YMI Jeans =

American clothing company

YMI
- Founded: 2000
- Founders: David Vered; Michael Godigian; Moshe Zaga
- Headquarters: Los Angeles, California, U.S.
- Website: www.ymijeans.com

YMI Jeans is an American company which manufactures denim jeans. The company is based in Los Angeles, and was founded in 2000 by David Vered, Michael Godigian and Moshe Zaga.

In 2010, the company inaugurated its new headquarters and distribution center in Los Angeles. In 2012, YMI began manufacturing levanta cola jeans, which enhance the buttocks. These are designed for Latina women, and are promoted with the slogan "Wanna Betta Butt?" YMI also makes "Hyper Flex" jeans, "made out of high-stretch fabric for the athleisure market." In 2016, YMI Jeans launched the WannaBettaShape to shape the waist and stomach. In 2022, Hocus Pocus 2's Juju Brenner became the brand's new ambassador.
