= Snook hook =

Veterinary surgical tool

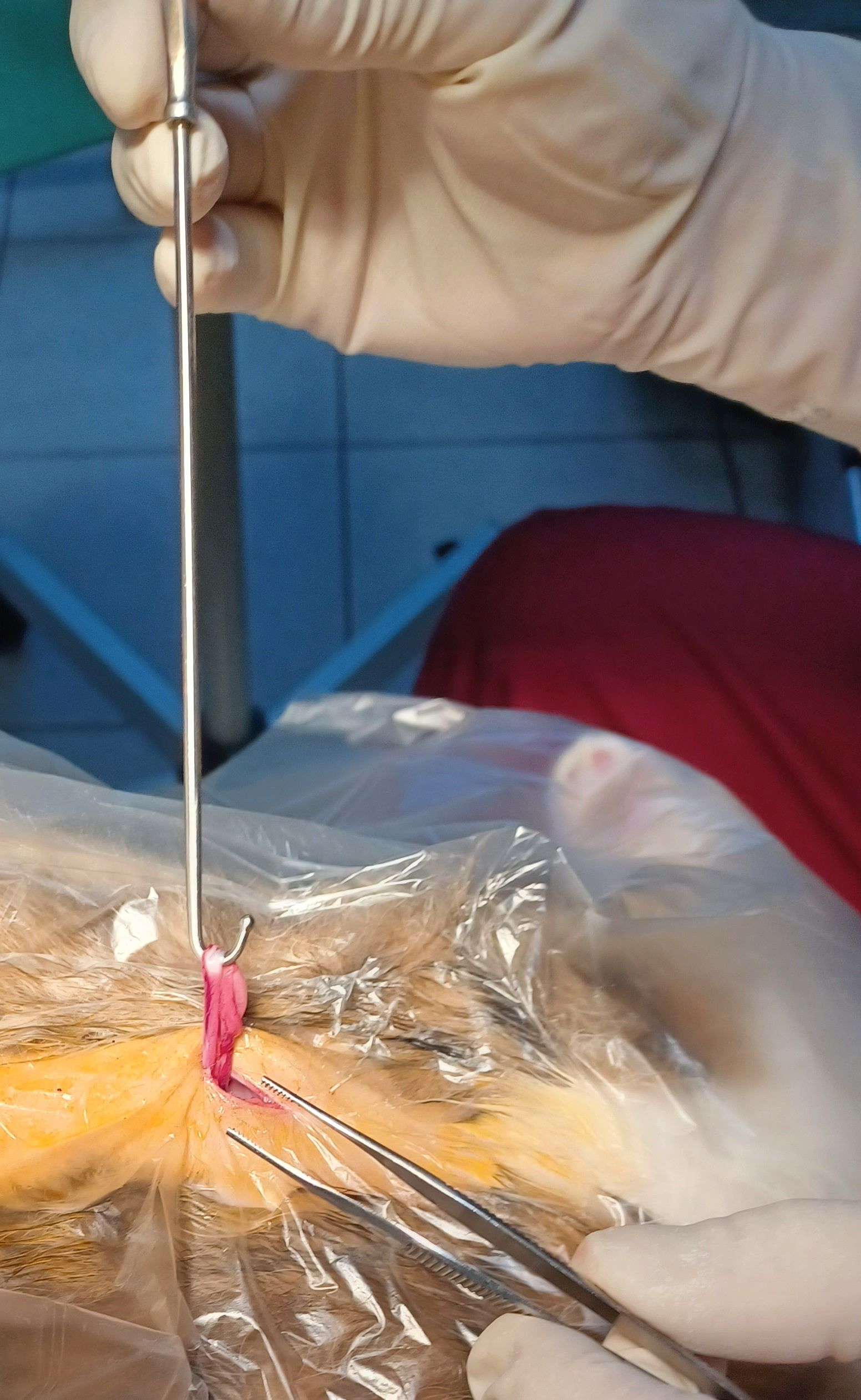
A Snook hook being used in operation on a cat

The Snook hook, also called a spay hook, is a hook-shaped surgical instrument used in veterinary surgery for the spaying of female animals. It was invented in the 1920s by James H. Snook, a veterinary professor at Ohio State University, and it remains in common use. The Snook hook is inserted into the abdominal cavity and used to retrieve and externalize the uterine horns and broad ligament from within the body for operation. The traditional method of spaying that is taught in most veterinary schools involves finding the uterus using a Snook hook after performing a ventral midline celiotomy.
