= Back closure =

Means for fastening a garment at the rear

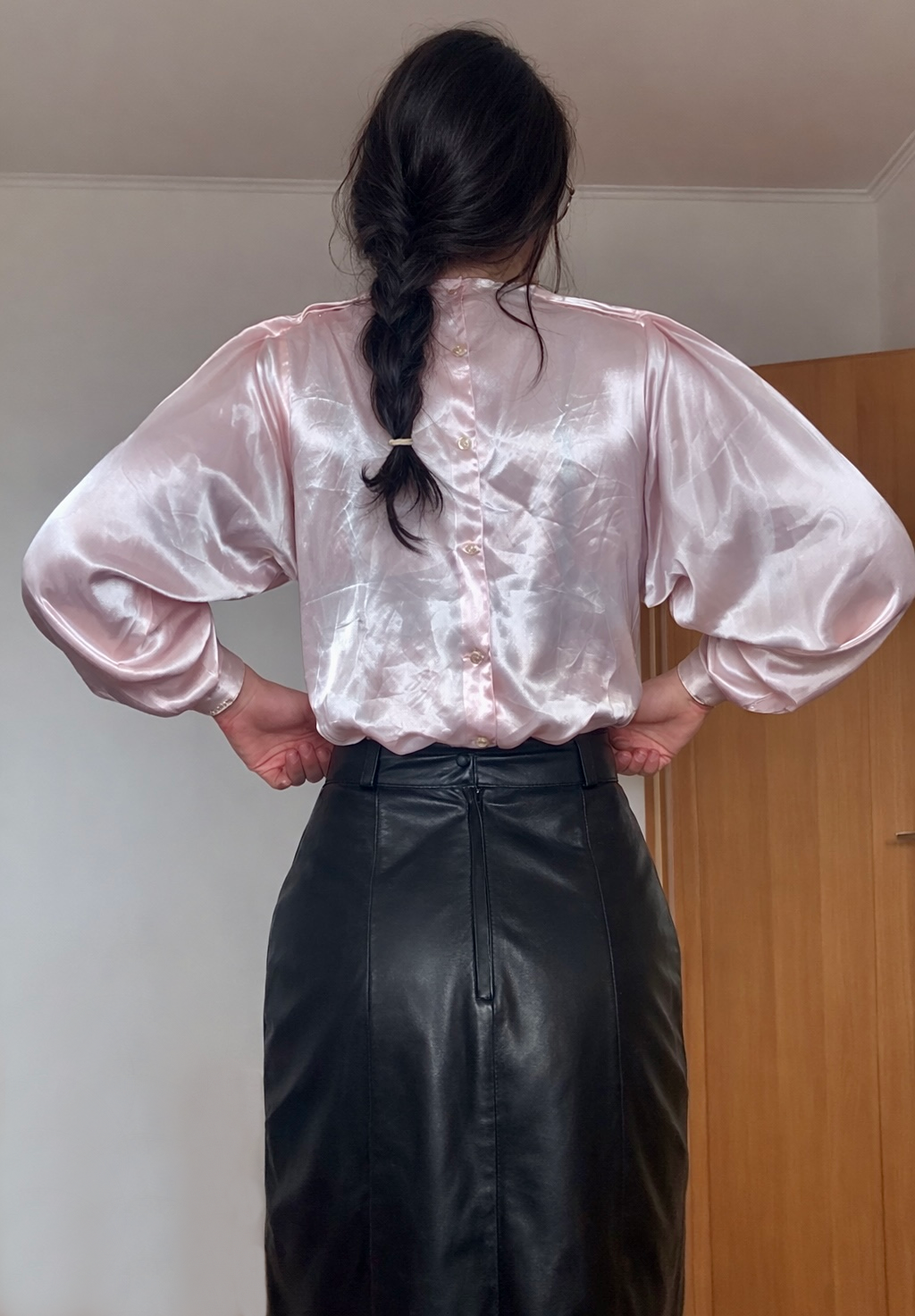
Woman wearing a back buttoned blouse and a skirt with a back zipper.

A back closure is a means for fastening a garment at the rear, such as with a zipper, hooks-and-eyes or buttons. Back closures were once common on Western female clothing, but have recently become less so, especially on female casual and business attire. They continue, however, to be widely used in underwear (such as brassieres and garter belts), formal wear (such as evening gowns and wedding dresses) and specialized clothing (such as smocks). Back closures are also common in garments for infants and toddlers.

== History ==
Back closures throughout the past several centuries have been common on clothes designed for females of all ages, including dresses, skirts, jumpers, blouses, sweaters, and sometimes slacks, and on certain unisex clothes such as infant and toddler wear, costumes, wetsuits and special-needs outfits. Though usually a feature of a garment's designs for stylistic reasons, some back closures can be difficult or sometimes impossible for the wearer to operate oneself, a factor that has favored their phase-out.

In earlier centuries, buttons found on the back of a dress as opposed to the front were originally intended to give the appearance of wealth in a woman, as wearing such a garment implied the woman could afford servants to help her dress. Many such dresses, especially the most frivolous and those intended for formal occasions, were difficult to impossible for the wearer to fasten by themselves. Back closures on female clothing remained common in Western fashion even through the Industrial Revolution, when servants became rare except to royalty and the wealthiest of women. Even then, back closures were still favored by women who wanted to appear wealthy or more attractive. It is for this reason that back closures have more often been associated with clothes intended for smarter occasions, such as formal events, religious services, or professional wear.

In the 1970s and 1980s, women began taking on a wider range of activities and professions; clothing originally intended as casual and sports wear became acceptable as street wear, and women began favoring such garments that they could don and doff unassisted.

Certain types of women's clothing, however, continue to feature back closures out of tradition. Formal wear such as evening gowns and wedding gowns, for example, frequently fasten at the back. Many summer dresses, especially in petite sizes, feature back zippers, though in recent years, fabrics that can retain these styles without the use of a zipper have been developed. Back closures also remain commonplace in some everyday garments that can be donned backwards and then reversed, such as skirts and bras, or that can be slipped on/off without the need for a closure, where they only are present for stylistic purposes.

== Advantages and disadvantages ==
- Back closures allow for a solid unbroken front to the garment that is uncluttered by fasteners. On thinner and more fitted garments, the bulk introduced by a button placket or a zippered seam may also be deemed less conspicuous when worn at the back. Designers thus often favor back closures in couture and formal wear, where aesthetics are more important: the solid front makes it simpler to feature elaborate necklines, embroidery and fabric patterns across the bust.
- A garment with adjustable fit may conform more closely to the torso if it fastens at the rear, where adjustments take in fabric across the flat of the back rather than the curve of the bust. Many women find back-fastening corsets and brassieres more comfortable for this reason.
- It is easier to flex one's arms forwards than backwards. A back closure may thus be easier for the wearer to enter and exit the garment from the rear, especially if it is closely fitted and does not stretch. A high-necked garment which opens at the back can also be quickly pulled on without disturbing one's hair.
- Most people find it awkward or difficult to reach the middle of their back, and even more so to manipulate fasteners, out of sight, on a garment that closes in back. The wearer may need assistance to dress and undress, or at least find it time-consuming to don or remove the garment.

== Garment types ==
=== Dresses ===
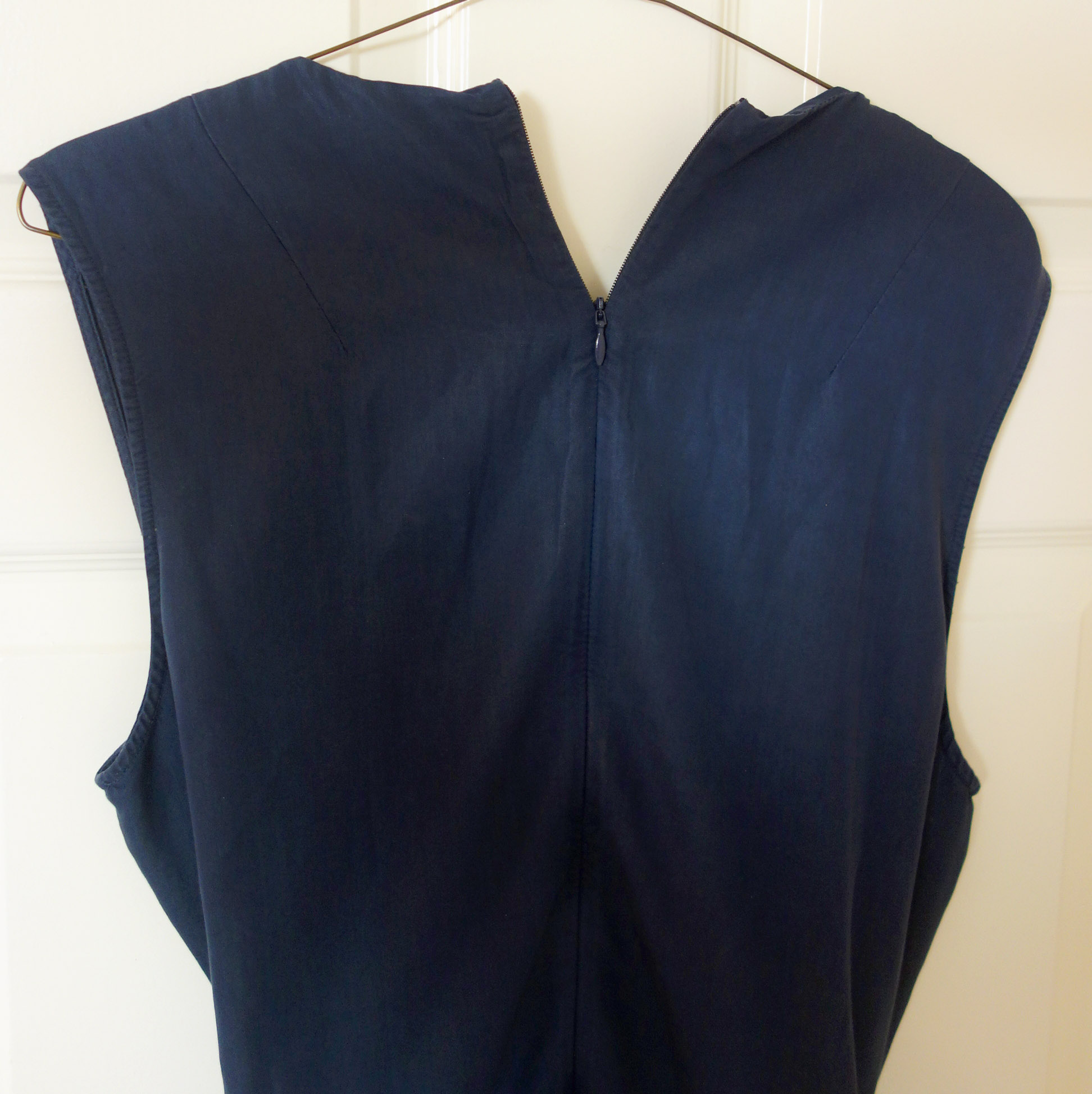
Dress with a discreet back zipper at the seam.

The zipper was initially popularized as a fastener for men's trousers. Though at first opposed on women's clothes due to the suggestiveness of speedy undressing, it ultimately became popular on women's clothing, particularly dresses, in the late 1930s, for their convenience over hook and eye fasteners, buttons and snap fasteners, hence the now obsolete term zipperback dress. Zippers are typically placed at the back seam of a dress. Some such garments may sport decorative buttons, lacing or mock closures at the front, but actually open at the back.

In the late 1990s, the hidden zipper started to make its way into the backs of dresses, skirts, and other garments, thereby making back closures not so noticeable. But since 2010, there has been a style to have extra conspicuous zippers on the backs of dresses, skirts, and blouses, which on not all garments need to be opened to don or remove the garment. Some have fancy pull tabs. Others expose on the exterior not only the teeth of the zipper but also the fabric.

=== Skirts ===
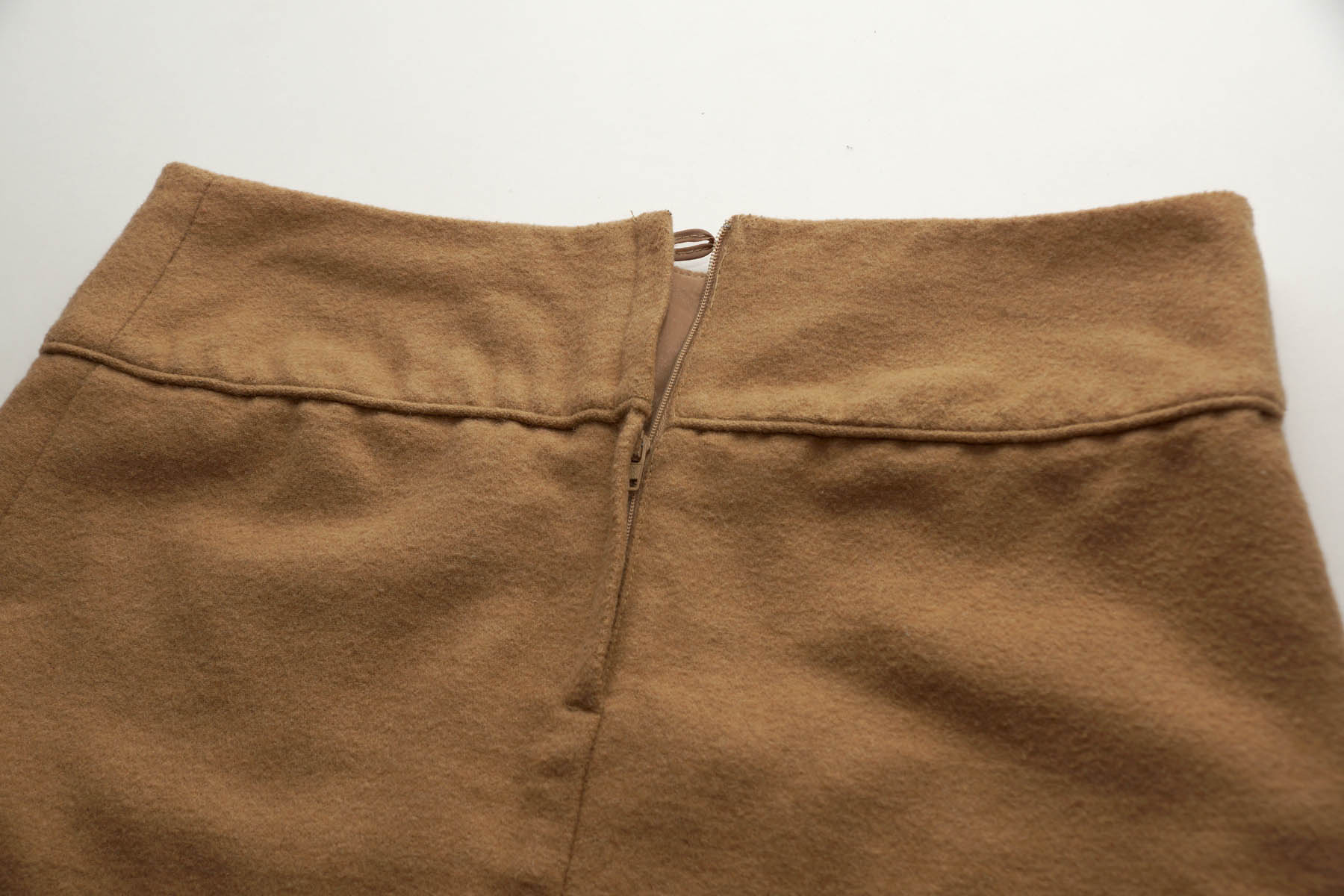
Back zipper on a skirt. A loop for a single waist button is also visible.

Skirts with back zippers continue to be commonplace, especially in career lines. They are likely to remain long after other garments with back closures lose popularity because they allow for a woman to easily dress herself. A back zipper on a skirt is normally easy to reach and manipulate, though by feel rather than sight. For occasions when it is not, then the wearer can simply rotate the skirt until the zipper becomes visible at the front or side, and turn it back when the job is done. Fitted skirts may have their back zippers accompanied by a single waist button, a hook-and-eye closure, or nothing else.

Though skirts are currently the most common place for a back zipper, many skirts are made in alternative styles. Other skirt closures that are popular today include a front fly similar to those found on pants (which is common on jean skirts), a side zipper, or a column of buttons in front. Many skirts, especially in plus sizes, feature an elastic waistband and no closure.

=== Blouses ===
Prior to the existence of the zipper, buttons were the most common back closure found on women's clothes. in the past, a dress was usually made with buttons covering the back from the neck down the waist, or several inches below. A blouse contained buttons down its full back. But later in the 20th century, garments for women were made with fewer buttons.

Toward the end of the 20th century, the keyhole button closure became popular on dresses and blouses made of nylon or silk, popular fabrics at the time. These garments, which had a roomy fit, were made to be slipped over, but the keyhole served simply as a fastener for the neck. Such clothes, mostly a part of a career line, were considered to be of high practicality. They could be worn interchangeably as casual clothes, and were easy to dress in, since they only required the fastening of a single button in a place that was easy to reach. This, combined with their T-shirt-like comfort and low cost, made them a popular choice for working women for a few decades. Since the 2000s, keyhole blouses have been replaced with sweater and T-shirt-like blouses that are elastic and are simply pulled over with no closures.

Some variations of the keyhole were blouses or dresses that had two or three buttons in back. Others had a fitted mockneck collar, accompanied by either a single button or buttons covering up to the top half of the blouse. Some blouses were made with a full length of buttons, but with a roomy fit, allowing them to be donned and removed with just a single button open.

=== Turtlenecks and mock turtlenecks ===
Many tops, including turtlenecks, mock turtlenecks, and similar sweaters, have back zippers. The zippers do not need to be open in order for the top to be pulled over. But the zipper allows the top to be widely open when being pulled over in order to not disturb one's hair style. These tops are usually marketed to older adults, who are more likely to have delicate hair styles that can be damaged by pulling a garment over.

=== Brassieres ===
Most bras close in the back with a series of hooks and eyes; many people can hook them behind their backs, particularly in smaller bra sizes which tend to have fewer hooks, but bras can also be donned with the closure in front and then turned around. Some bras have a front closure, which reduces the size adjustability compared to back closure bras that usually have 3 size adjustments available. The styles are limited in this type of bra because the need for a closure at front reduces the style and fit options. Front bra closures can be a sort of twist clip, a zipper, or hooks. Some bras, particularly sports bras, and many bralettes have no closure at all, and are pulled on over the head like a tank top.

While front closing bras and pull-over bras (commonly known as sports bras) do exist, back closing bras remain the most popular type. JC Penney reported in 2004 that back-closing bras accounted for 62% of all bra sales.

=== Other women's garments ===
During the 1980s and 1990s, one-piece pants or shorts outfits that had back zippers or occasionally buttons were popular. These posed the problem that the wearer would be required to reach in back to unzip the garment simply for bathroom usage. Only those who were capable of reaching in back to zip/unzip these garments themselves could wear them. These garments are rarely seen today.

In the early 2000s, pants with back zippers, which have existed in the past, were popular. These were easier to operate than outfits with full back zippers.

=== Other types of clothes ===
Video of a man putting on a diving suit. During closing the back zipper and the velcro securing it, he has some difficulties typical for this configuration, and where a second person can be of great help.

Small children
Many clothes made for 3 year old or younger children of either gender have zippers or buttons on the back. Such children mostly dressed by their parents or other adults, and this location can add ease, as well as style, to the child's outfit. Additionally, costumes made for children up to around age 12 frequently have back zippers.
Adult males
Generally, regular clothes made for adult males do not ever have back closures. However, an exception is the cummerbund of the men's tuxedo.
Wetsuits
Rear openings on wetsuits and diving suits can make it easier for a wearer to enter them. Most such suits are intended to be worn as skin-tight garments and are made of rubber or neoprene, which do not stretch easily at the thicknesses needed to insulate the wearer against cold water.
Protective clothing
Aprons and smocks typically fasten at the rear as they have no openings at the front which could admit staining or hazardous substances. Most household aprons are designed to be donned quickly and can simply be slipped over the head and tied at the back of the waist.
Special needs
Adaptive garments designed for those with physical disabilities (such as arthritis) often open at the rear so that they can be put on without having to bend the arms backwards. Such garments are also easier for caregivers to put on an unresponsive or disabled person. Hospital gowns traditionally tie at the back for this same reason.
Garments with rear closures are also used on patients with dementia (such as those with Alzheimer's disease) to prevent them from disrobing at inappropriate moments or interfering with their diapers. These are typically one-piece jumpsuits with back zippers.

== Alternatives to back closures ==
In the past, when back closures were the norm, clothes that contained them were seen as more "classy" or "dressy" by women on this basis alone, and were sought by many women. Due to the difficulty in self-fastening or unfastening a back closure, designers have employed a number of alternatives in order to make dressing and undressing easier while retaining fashionability by focusing on improving other elements of design. The alternatives, which are often used in combination, include:

- Elasticity: The garment may have elastic panels added or be made of a more elastic fabric to allow the garment to simply be slipped on and off without the benefit of a closure. While some elastic is hidden by being covered or placed on a less noticeable part of the garment, other elastic bands are designed stylishly.
- Front closures: Some garments are made with front closures, similar to fly openings on men's trousers and button plackets on men's shirts, but may retain a feminine cut. Other garments (such as uniform dresses for service workers like waitresses and cleaners, for example) may feature a front zipper, but concealed in a seam or flap of fabric.
- Looser fit: A larger neckhole and/or a looser bodice allows the garment to be slipped on over the head without the need for a fastener.
- Side closures: Side zippers have been around from before the 1950s, and are in fashion on and off. These are not as hidden from frontal view of the garment, can cause fabric to bunch up and look odd, appear less clean in outline silhouettes, and on dresses require the neck to be somewhat scooped. Side zippers are easier for the wearer to reach. Side zippers on skirts, especially for petite women, are common. They are also found sometimes on trousers. Side buttons are often found on jumper dresses and overalls. In the past, many blouses and sweaters were made with shoulder buttons, a feature rarely seen in today's fashion.
- Shoulder closures: On sleeved garments, such as crew-neck and mock-neck sweaters, these allow the neckhole to be opened far enough for the garment to be pulled on or off over the head. On sleeveless garments, a shoulder closures are typically shoulder straps which can be undone at the top or detached from the front of the garment.
- Back closures for show: Some dresses, blouses, and sweaters contain a zipper or buttons on the back for aesthetic purposes only, but opening or closing it is not required in order to don and remove the garment easily.

== In popular culture ==
- The children's song "Miss Mary Mack" (of unknown origin) contains the lyrics "All dressed in black, black, black, With silver buttons, buttons, buttons, All down her back, back, back."
- In The Red Balloon, Pascal wears a sweater with a back zipper through the first half of the film.

== See also ==
- Locking clothing
