= Dress hook =

Decorative clothing fastener

Dress hook

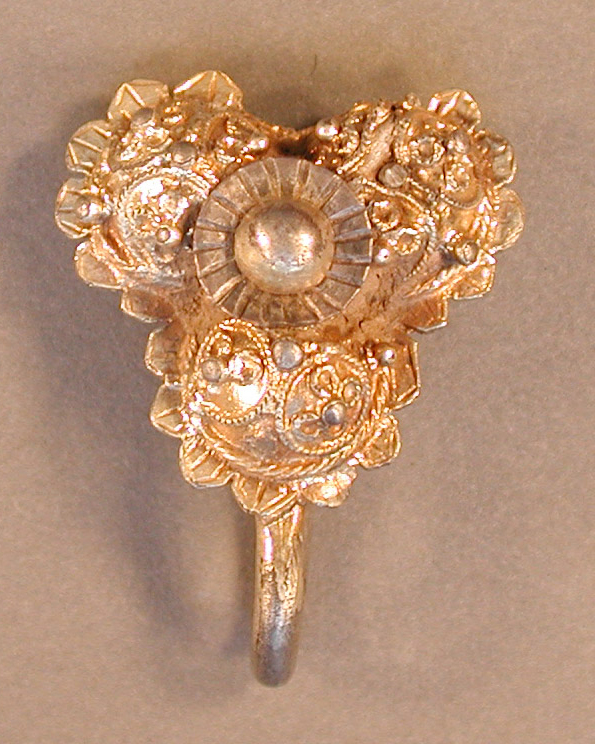
Front view

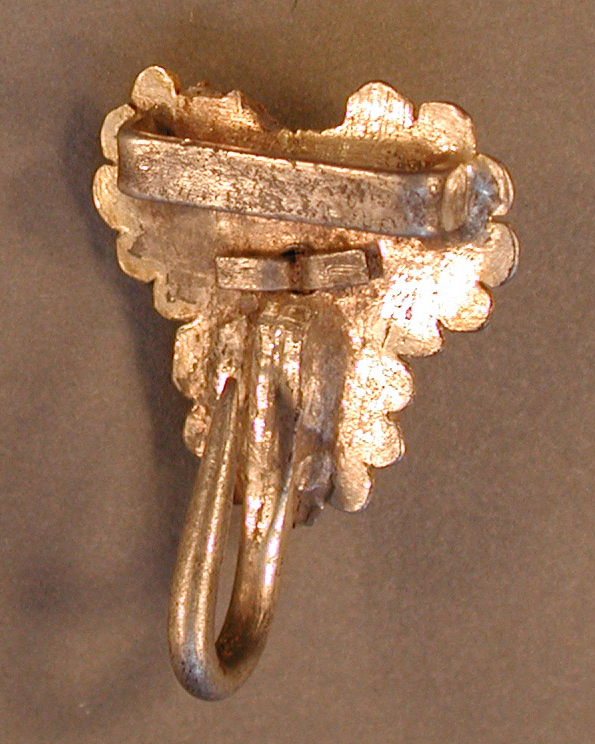
Back view

Silver-gilt three-lobed dress hook with silver ornament, 16th century, found in the East Riding of Yorkshire.

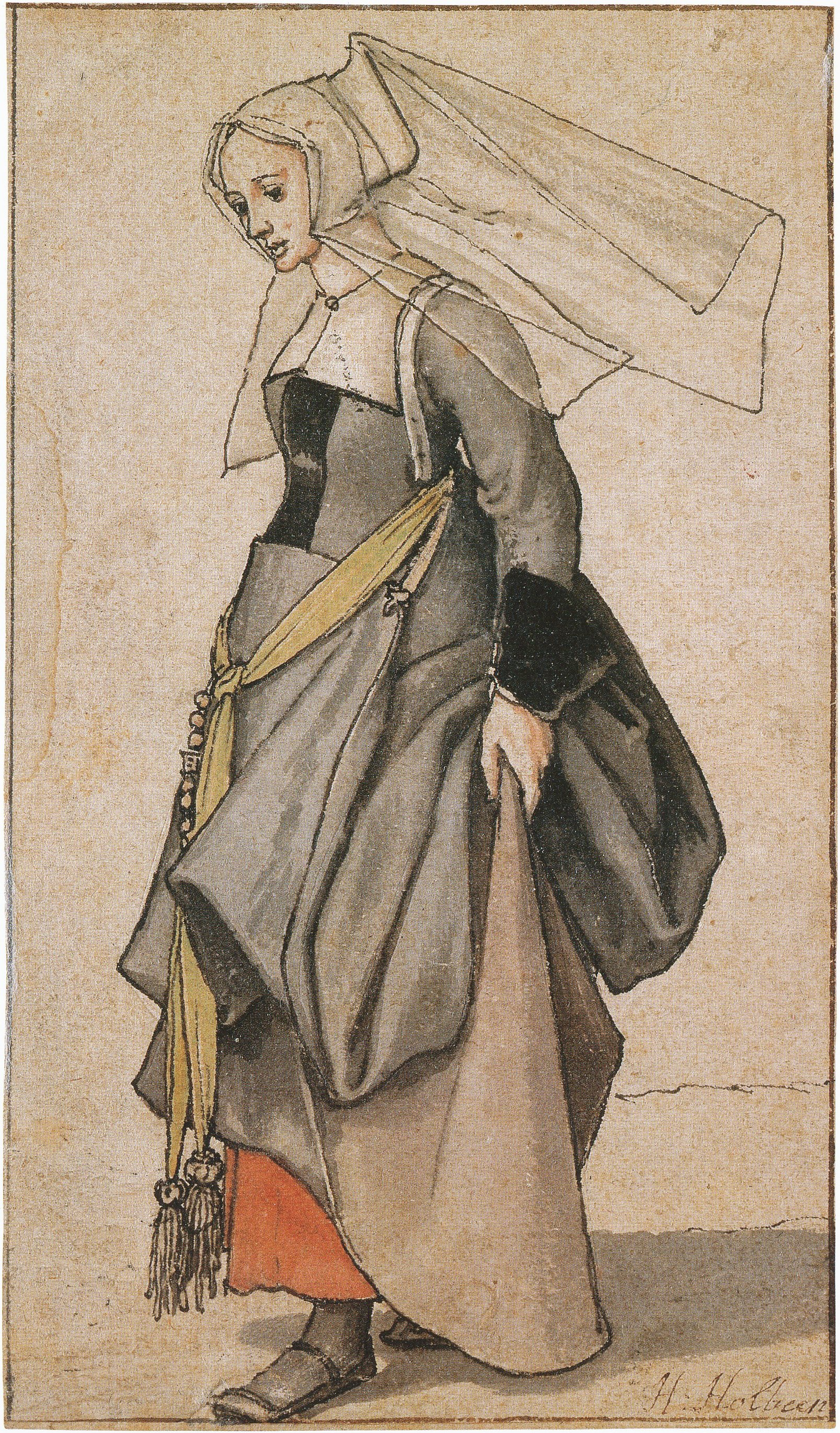
A Young Englishwoman, a costume study by Hans Holbein the Younger, showing dress hooks used to tuck up a gown.

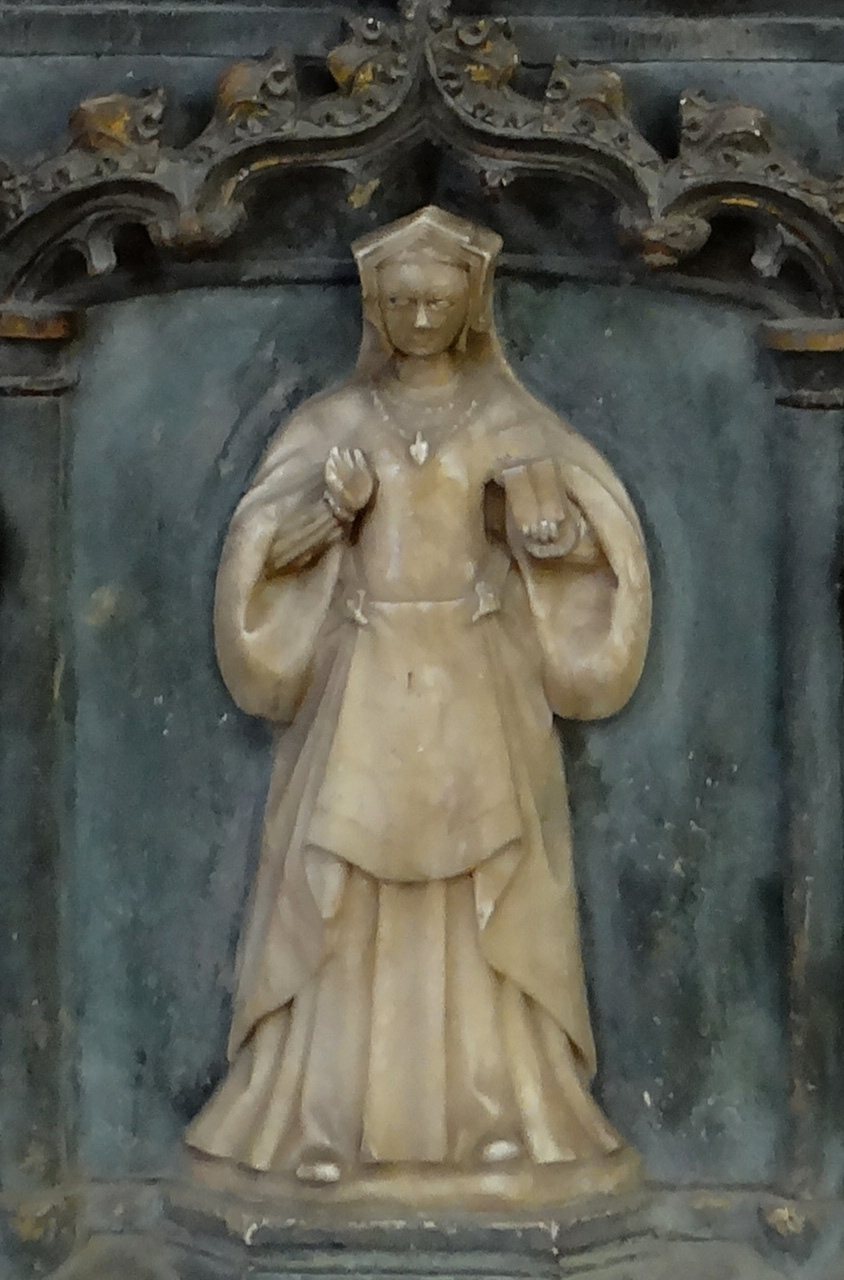
"Weeper" with dress hooks. Detail of monument in Church of St Mary the Virgin, Fawsley.

A dress hook is a decorative clothing accessory of the medieval and Tudor periods used to fasten outer garments or to drape up skirts. Made of base metal or precious silver and silver-gilt, dress hooks are documented in wills and inventories, and surviving hooks have been identified in the archaeological record throughout England.

"Dress hook" is the modern specialist terminology. In historical records, these items are referred to simply as "hooks", and context may be needed to differentiate them from hook-and-eye closures, which were also used in large quantities, in both base and precious metals, in the 15th and 16th centuries.

== Usage ==
Documentary evidence suggests that dress hooks were often owned in pairs. Dress hooks were used to draw up skirts, either to keep them out of the muck of the street or to display the rich fabric of the garment beneath, and may also have been used to fasten garments or simply as decoration. At the time of her death in 1509, the jewellery of Lady Margaret Beaufort included "ij [2] hookys siluer vpon a rybande for the Tuckyng of a gown". A drawing of a young Englishwoman, probably a merchant's wife, by Hans Holbein the Younger shows skirts caught up with hooks in this manner. The drawing is dated to the late 1520s or early 1530s.

== Study and classification ==
Dress hooks were little studied until the UK Treasure Act of 1996 required the examination and assessment of such small objects when made of precious metals. A seminal cross-disciplinary study of silver-gilt dress hooks in the Journal of the Society of Antiquaries of London in 2002 identified three broad classes of dress hooks:

- Ornamental hooks with bars on the back for attaching the hook to a girdle (cloth belt) or to clothing
- Hook-fasteners, cast in a single plane with a bar or loop at the top for attachment, known in base metal form in the Low Countries and Britain from the late 15th to early 17th centuries
- Novelty forms, such as the cylindrical hook found in Brabourne Lees, Kent, in 1998

Similar items include the twisted-wire double-ended dress fasteners of the Medieval period and late Medieval and Tudor cap hooks.

Surviving Dress Hooks

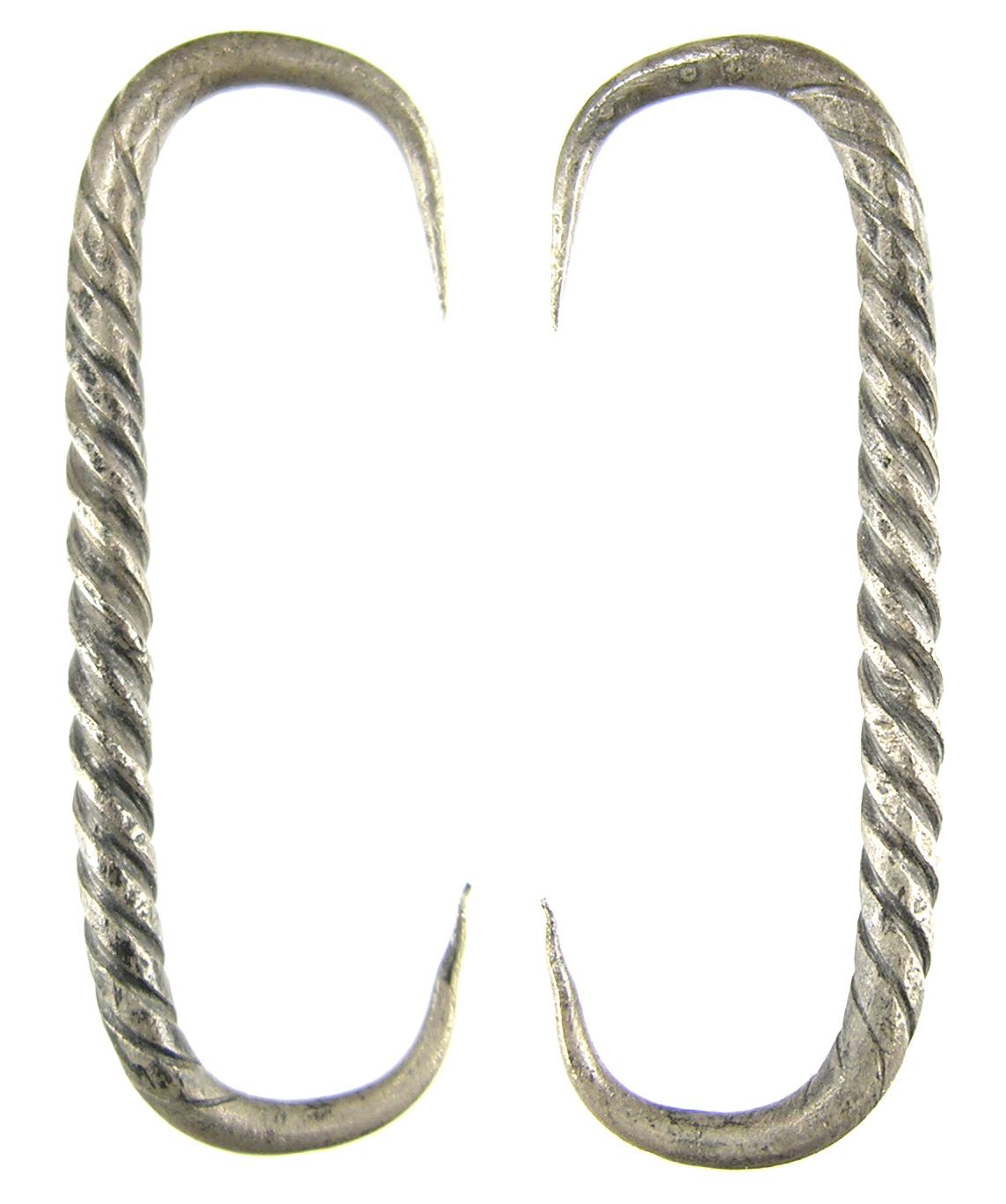
Twisted silver wire dress fastener, ca. 1350–1500, London

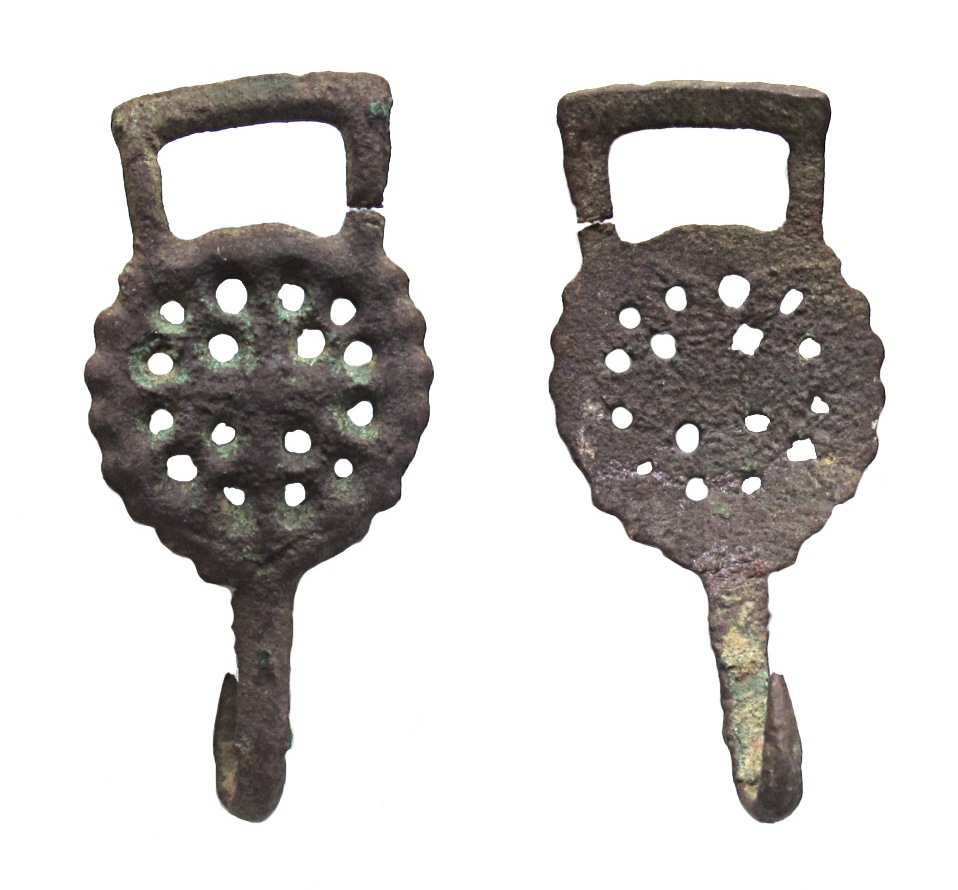
Copper alloy dress hook, ca. 1550–1700, North Yorkshire

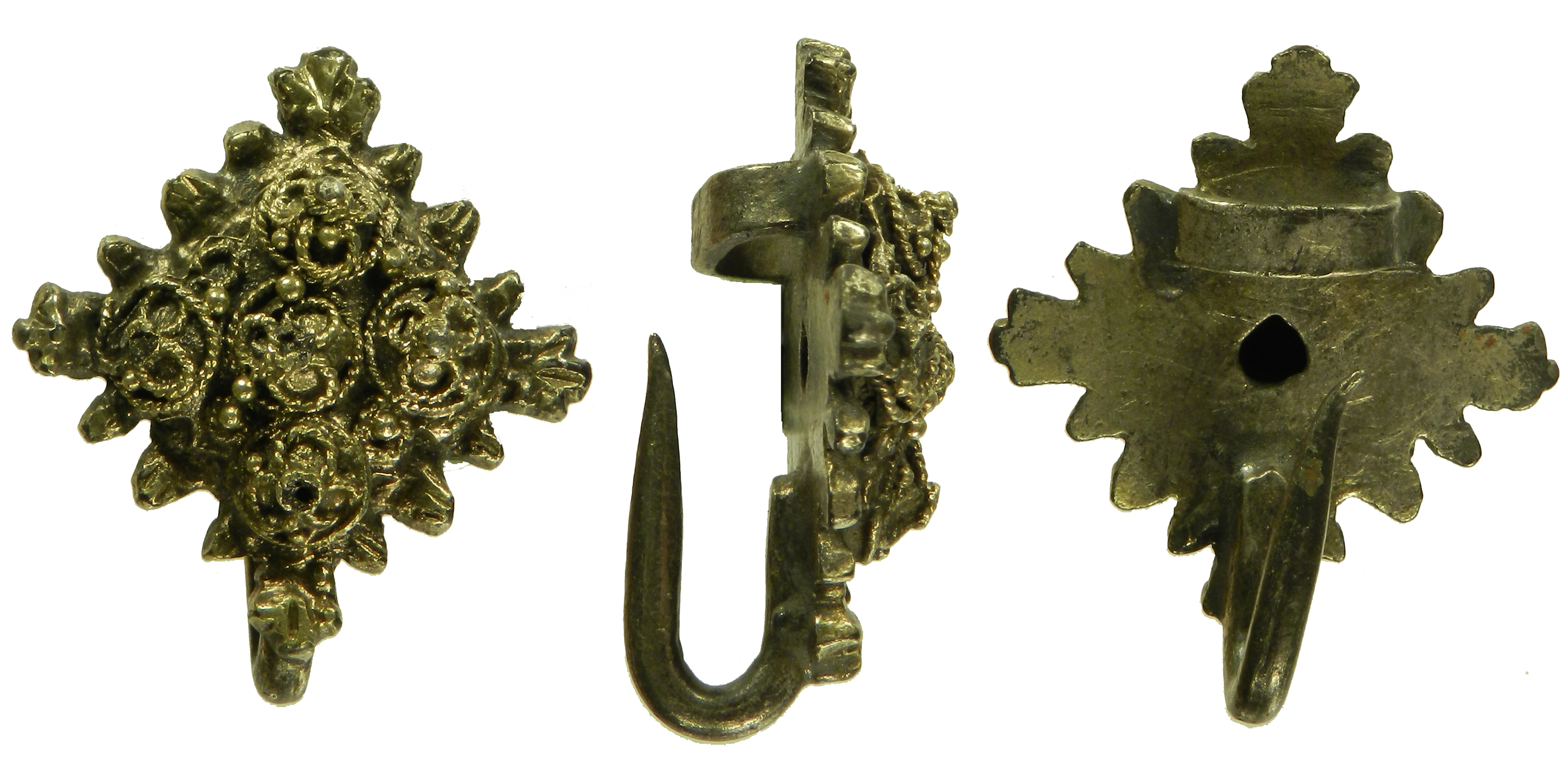
Bar-backed cast silver dress hook, Cheshire

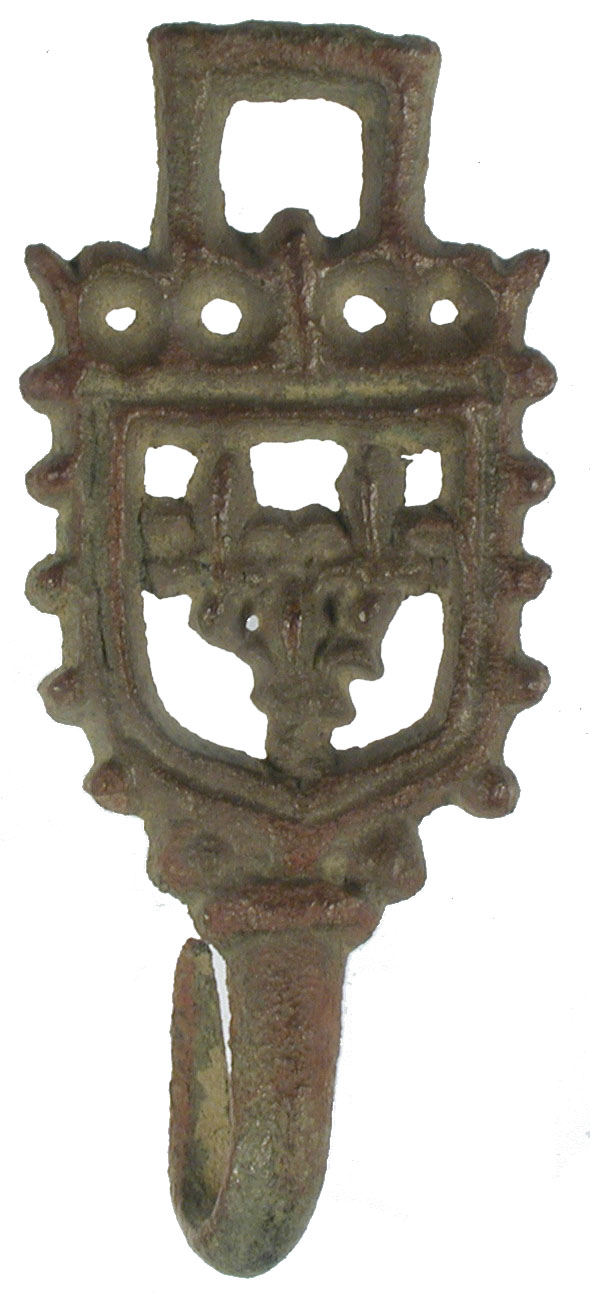
Medieval hook-fastener, Kent

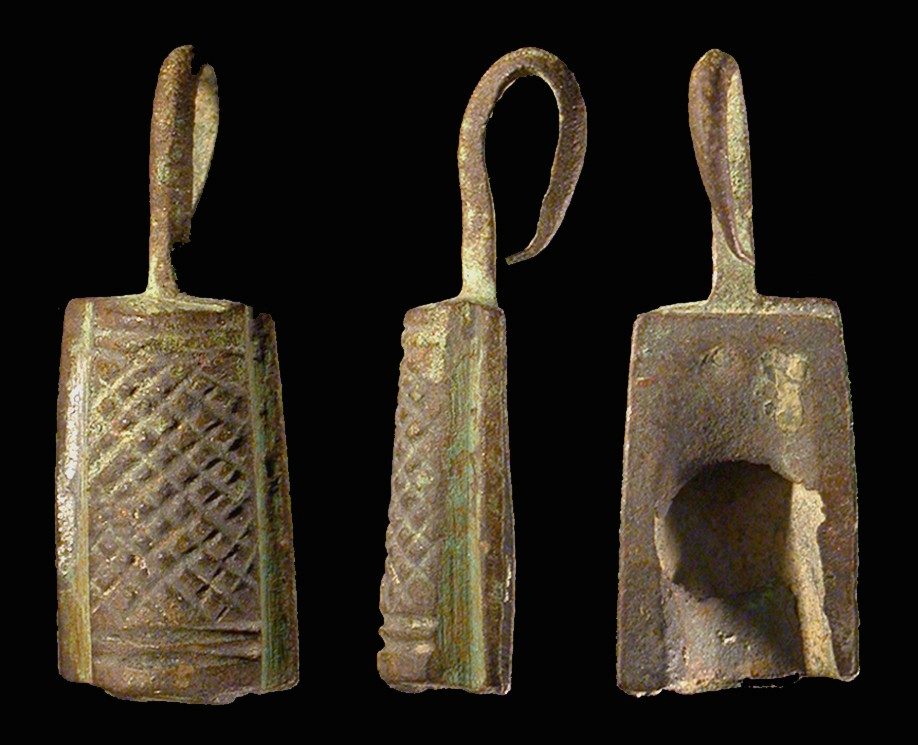
Half-cylinder copper alloy dress hook, possibly late medieval, Isle of Wight

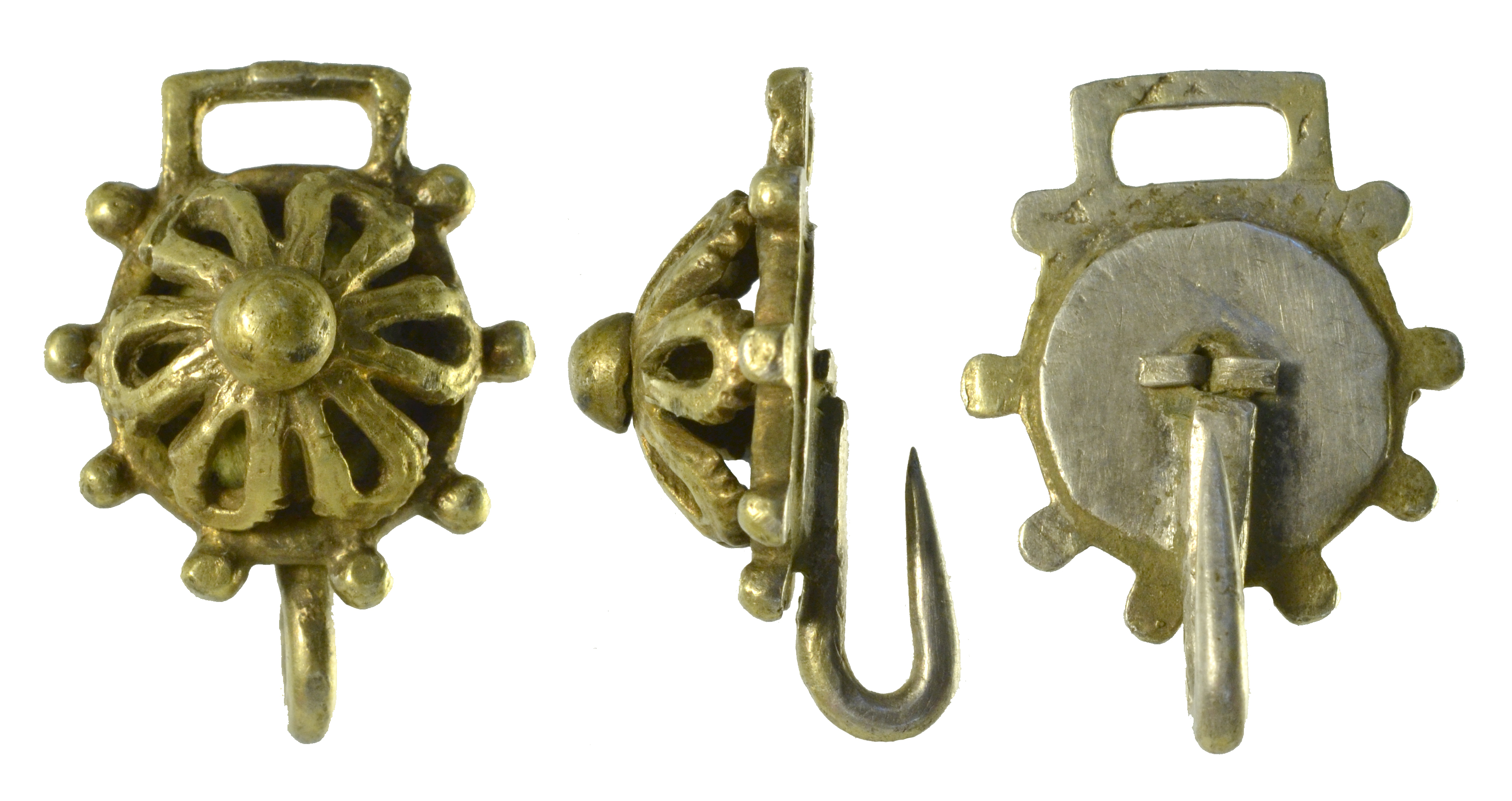
Composite silver-gilt dress hook, Suffolk
