= Cap hook =

Decorative hat ornament

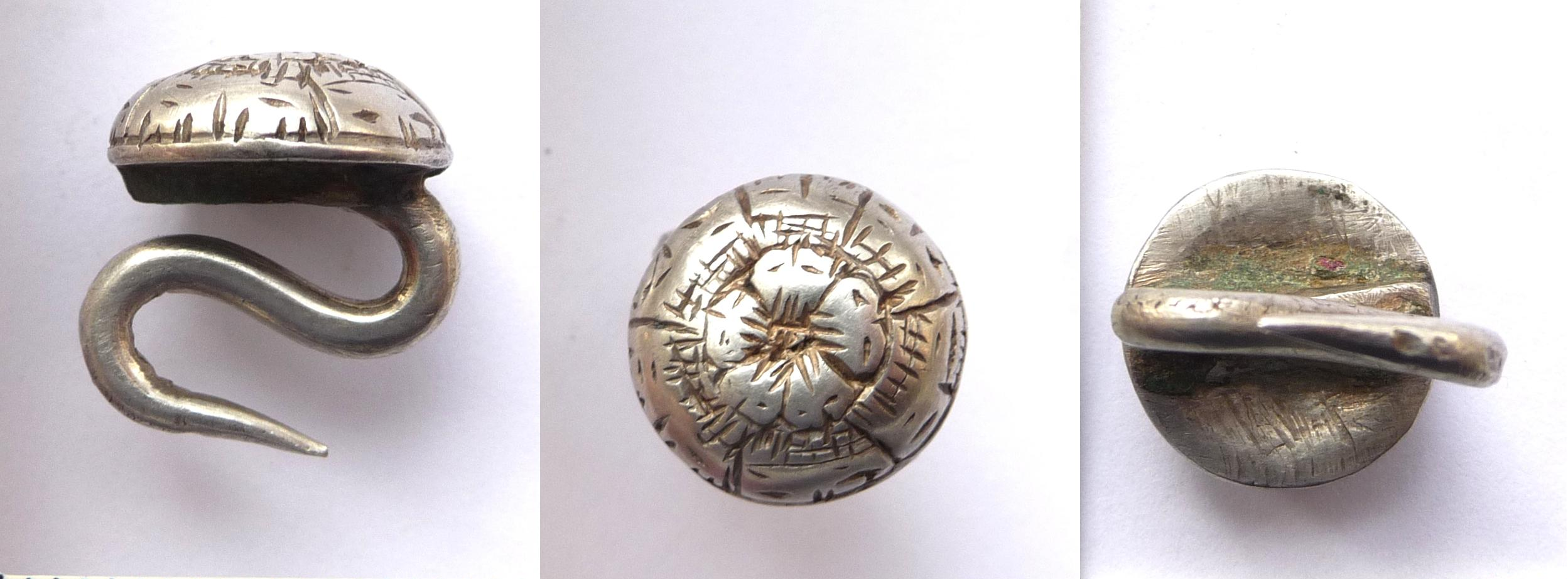
Silver cap hook with incised ornament, diameter 12.9 mm (0.51 in), c. 1500–1700

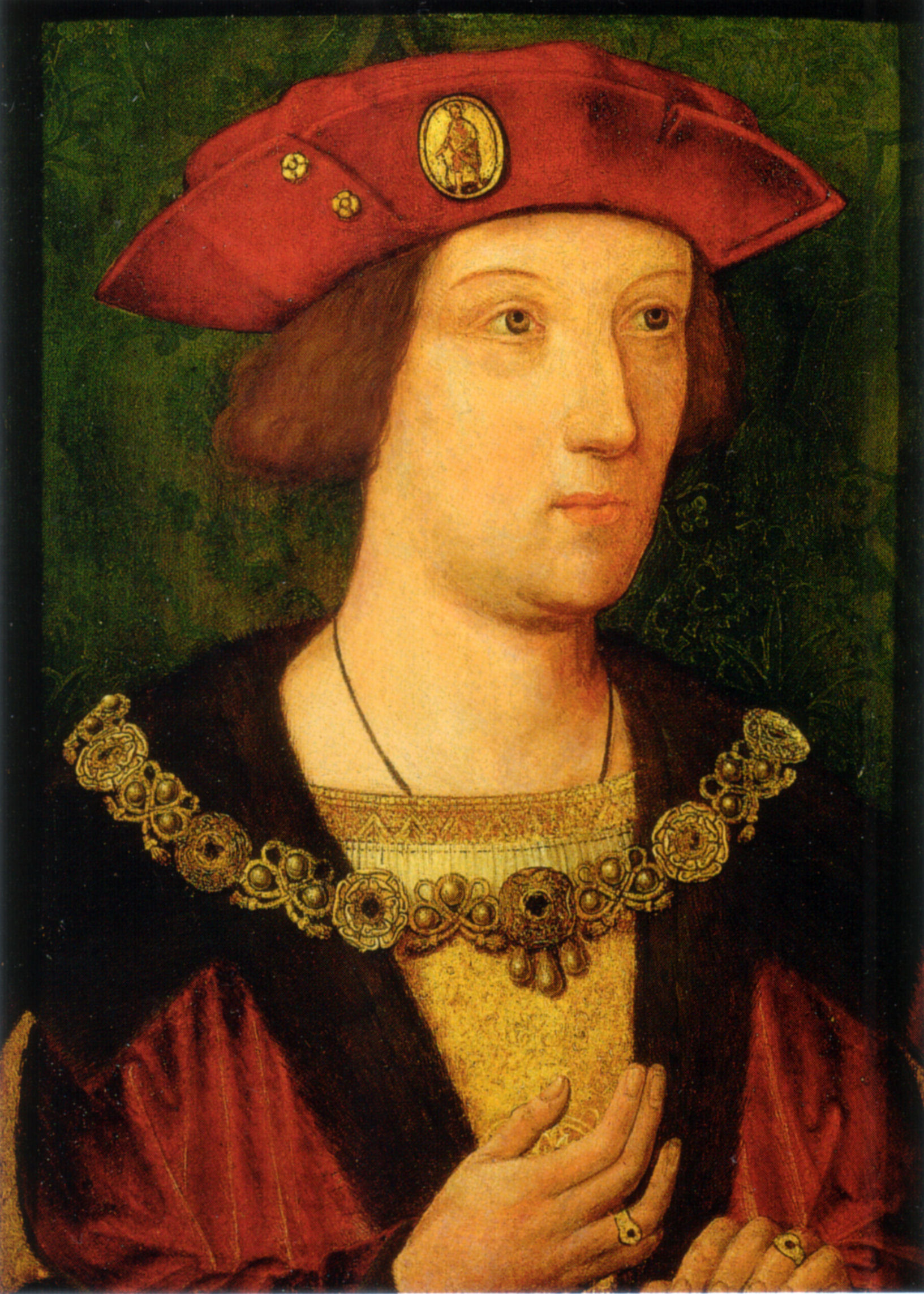
Portrait of Arthur, Prince of Wales c. 1500 wearing a hat with an enseigne badge of Saint John the Baptist and two small rosette-shaped cap hooks

A cap hook is a decorative hat ornament fashionable from the Late Middle Ages through the Tudor period, used to pin up or decorate men's hat brims. Cap hooks were made of gold, silver, or silver-gilt base metal, and might be decorated with jewels or enamelling.

Cap hooks could be purely decorative or could carry religious or symbolic meaning. The latter form are called enseignes and may be an evolution of the medieval pilgrim badge.

== Usage ==
In the early 16th century, it became fashionable for men to wear multiple small cap hooks alongside a larger hat jewel on the turned-up brims of their hats.

== Study and identification ==
Cap hooks were little studied until the UK Treasure Act of 1996 required the examination and assessment of such small objects when made of precious metals. A seminal cross-disciplinary study of silver-gilt hooks in the Journal of the Society of Antiquaries of London in 2002 differentiates cap hooks from other types of dress hooks. Cap hooks have a hook behind the ornament, where it is invisible in use. This makes distinguishing cap hooks from buttons or other types of ornaments in portraits difficult. Cap hooks are also elusive in written records, possibly because such ornaments were referred to as "buttons" regardless of their method of attachment.

Surviving Cap Hooks

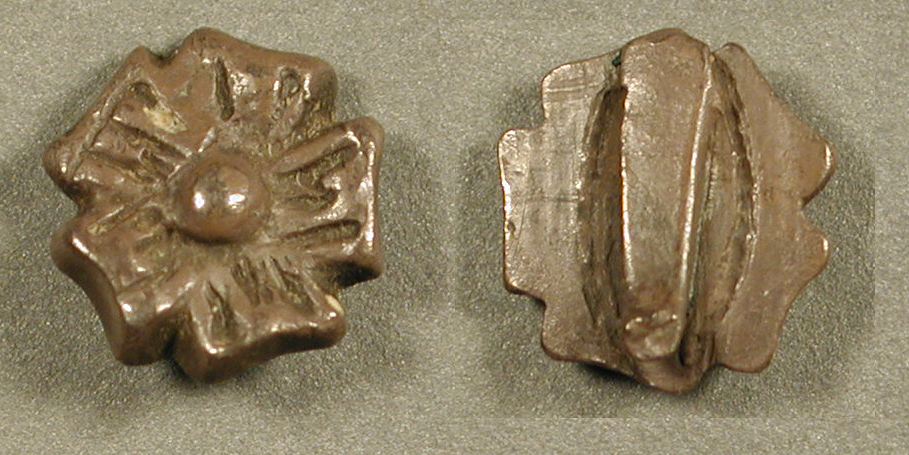
Silver-gilt rosette cap hook, ca. 1480–1580

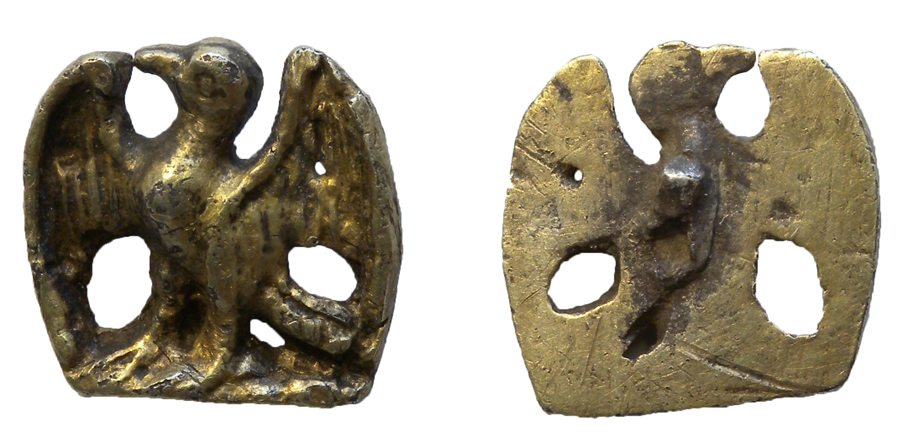
Silver-gilt cap hook in the form of a bird, ca. 1485–1600

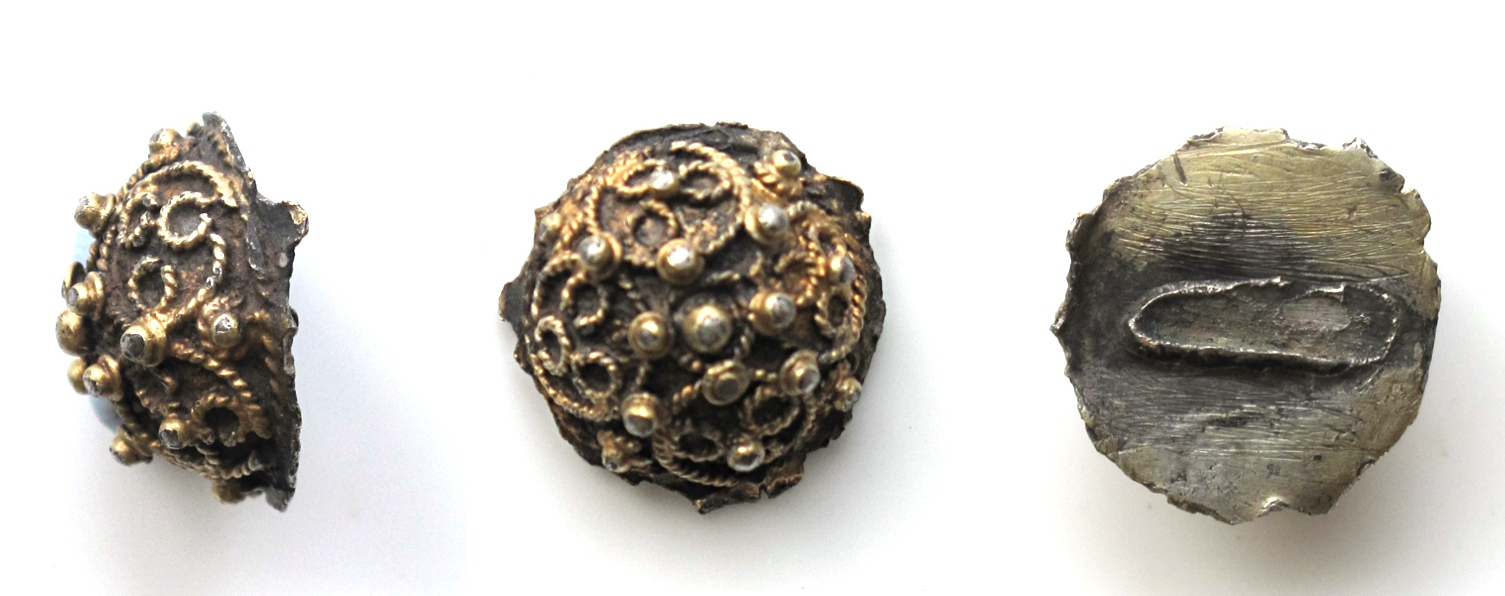
Silver-gilt cap hook, hook now missing, post-Medieval
