= High-rise (fashion) =

Clothing which sits high on or above the hips

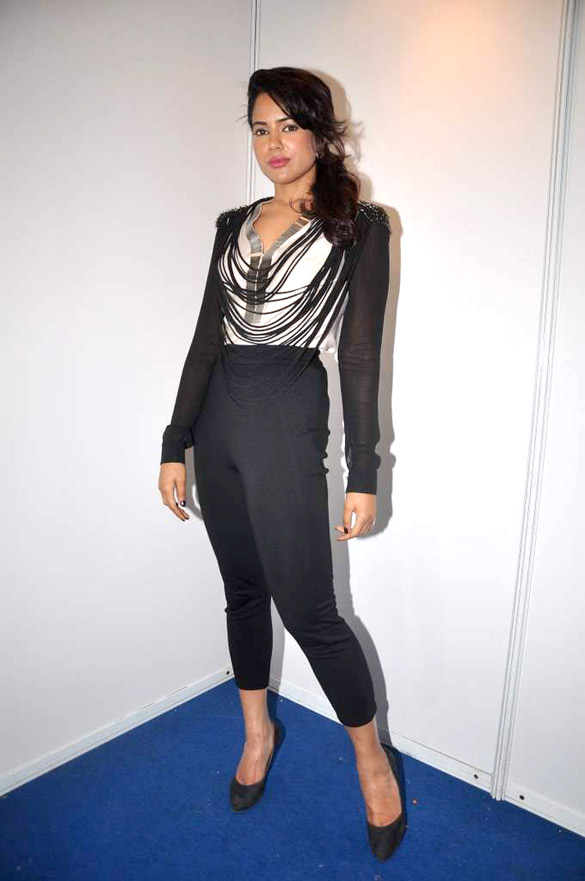
Actress Sameera Reddy wearing black high-waisted trousers.

A high-rise or high-waisted garment is one designed to sit high on, or above, the wearer's hips, usually at least 8 centimetres (3 inches) higher than the navel. In Western cultures, high-rise jeans were especially common in the 1970s, from the late 1980s through the late 1990s, were derided as mom jeans in the 2000s, and popular again in the mid-to-late 2010s and continues to be popular into the present in competition with low-rise pants.

== Modern fashion ==
In western culture, high-waisted pants tend to have long zippers, ranging from about 7-10 inches long, and leave the navel either completely covered or barely shown. Zipper lengths are not to be confused with rises. High-waisted pants have rises typically 10 inches long or longer.

In European menswear, pants sat level with the navel until the 1950s, and were held up by a pair of suspenders. During the 1940s, Zoot suiters wore pants with a waistband so high that they often reached the chest.

=== 1960s to 1990s ===
Low-waisted drainpipe jeans and flared trousers were a counterculture statement among the Mods and hippies of the late 1960s and early 1970s, in contrast to the higher waisted Levi Strauss jeans teenagers had worn previously. During the late 1970s, however, there was a backlash against disco and hippie fashions, and members of Generation X opted for higher rise pants. These straight leg acid wash jeans remained popular throughout the 1980s and 1990s, until hip hop fashion went mainstream and it became fashionable for teenagers to sag their baggy pants. High rise pants, jeans, and shorts were also popular with men's, young men's, teens, and boys clothing during the 1980s and early to mid 1990s.

=== Revival ===
During the mid 2010s and continuing into the 2020s, high waisted pants underwent a revival among younger women, in reaction to the low-rise skinny jeans that were popular during the previous decade.

During the 2000s and 2010s, male celebrities who wore high-rise jeans, including President Barack Obama, Simon Cowell, and Top Gear presenter Jeremy Clarkson, were ridiculed by the press.

Taylor Swift was a polarizing figure of wearing high waisted bottoms to cover her belly button.

== Indian culture ==
In ancient India, some Indian philosophers opposed saris that expose the midriff. They considered it to be a symbol of adultery.

The Dharmasastra writers stated that women should be dressed such that the navel would not become visible. Still today, some corporate offices in India have strict dress codes for women, requiring high-rise saris to be worn to avoid navel exposure.

== Gallery ==
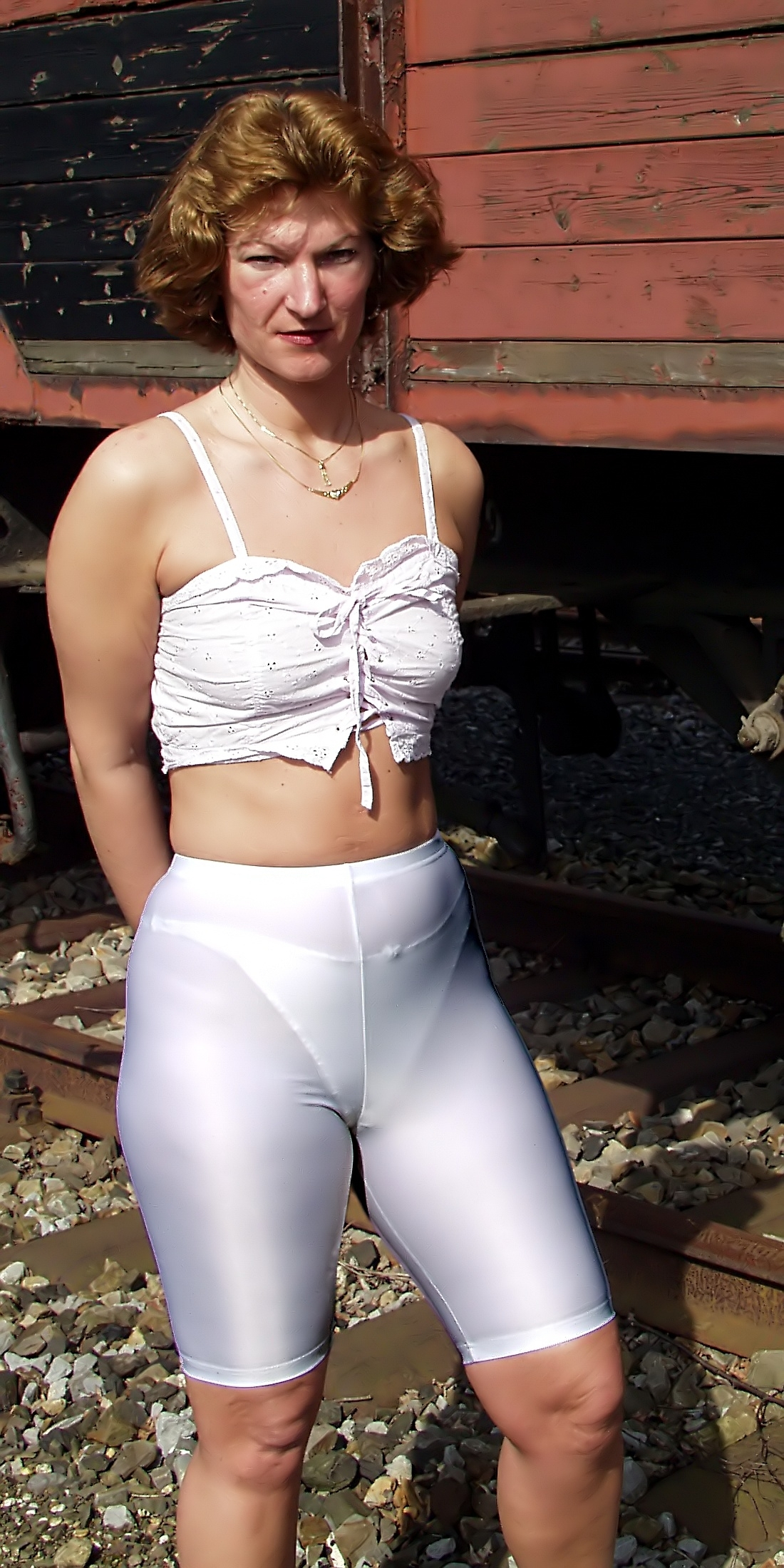
High-rise leggings

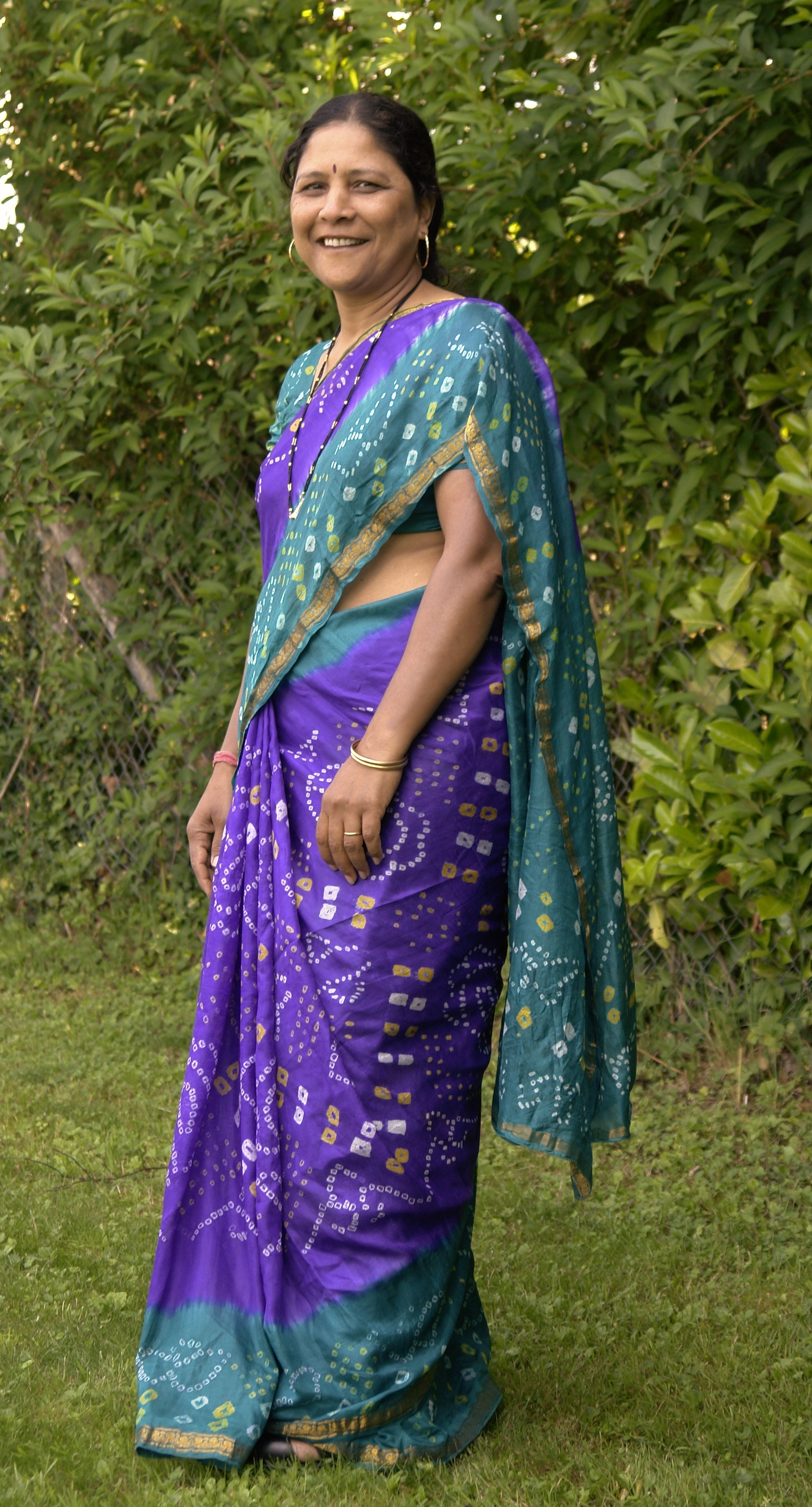
High-rise sari

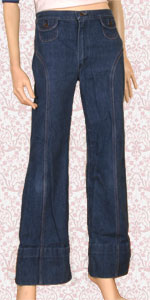
High waisted flared trousers

== See also ==
- Empire silhouette
- Hip-huggers
- Low-rise pants
- Mom jeans
- Midriff
