= Denim skirt =

Skirt made of denim

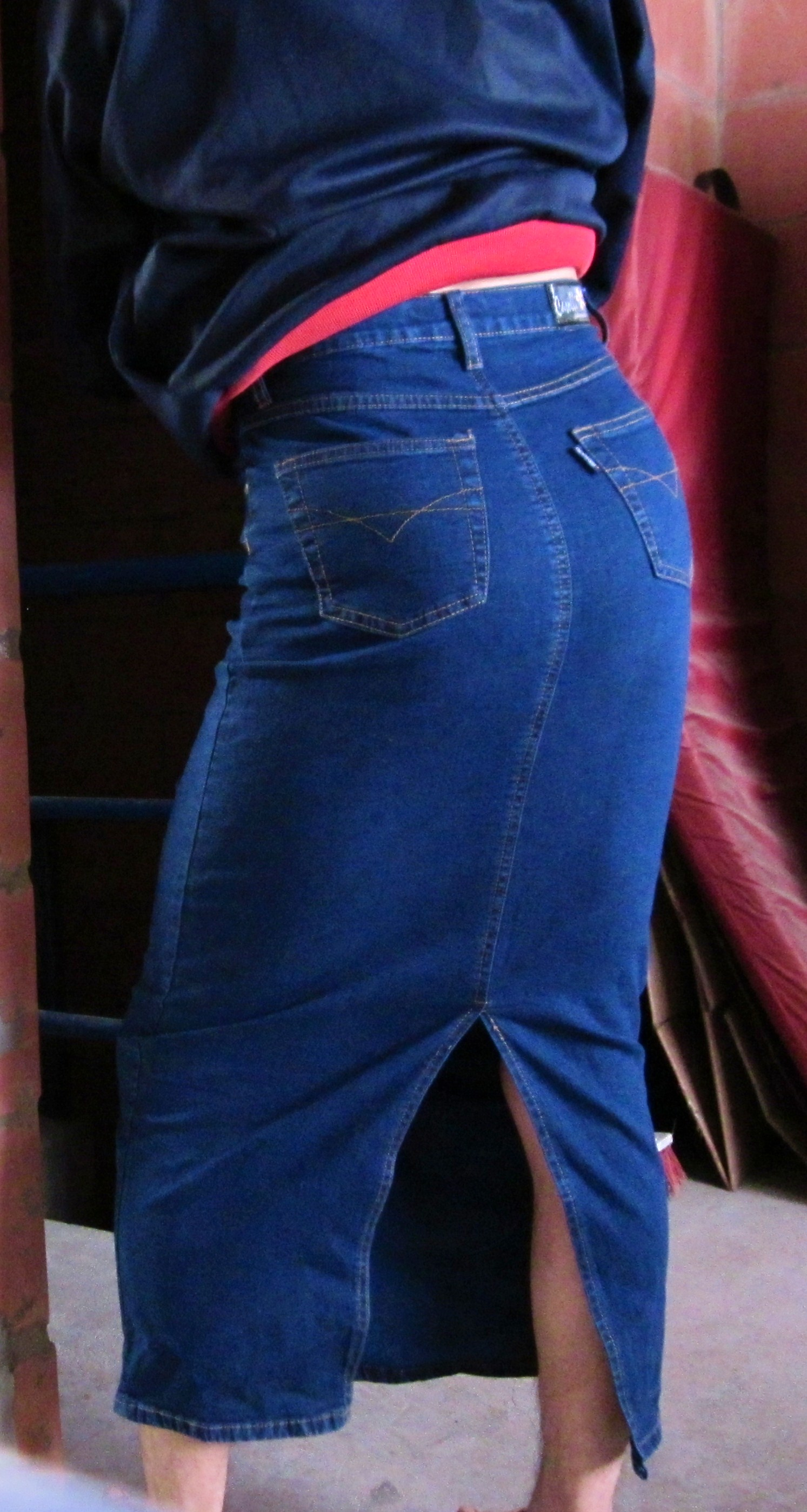
The front and back of a modest full-length denim skirt often worn by conservative Christians, such as Fundamental Baptists and Holiness Methodists.

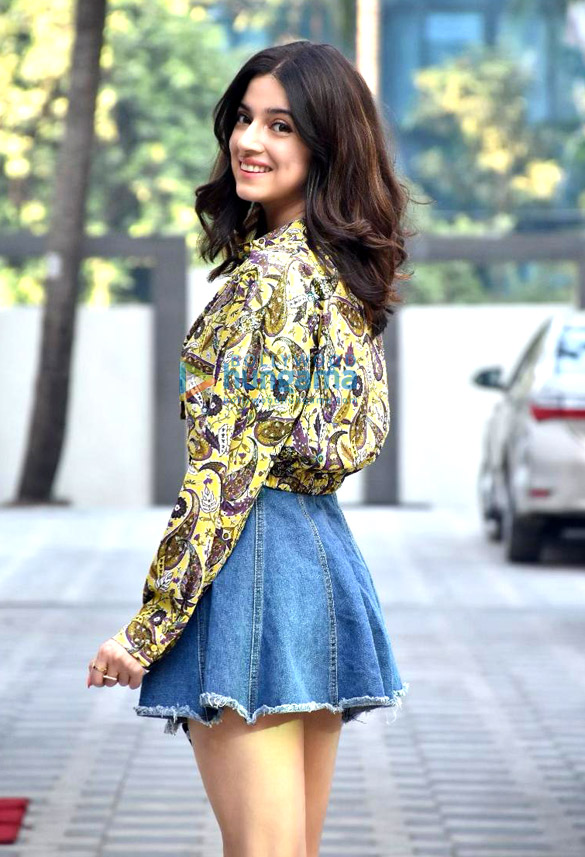
Indian woman in denim miniskirt (2020)

A denim skirt, sometimes referred to as a 'jean skirt' or 'jeans skirt', is a skirt made of denim, the same material as blue jeans. Denim skirts come in a variety of styles and lengths to suit different populations and occasions. For example, full-length denim skirts are commonly worn by women whose religious beliefs prohibit them from wearing trousers, including those of certain Christian denominations (such as Conservative Anabaptists, Holiness Methodists, Holiness Quakers, Fundamental Baptists and Holiness Pentecostals), as well as Orthodox Jews. In contrast, in the mainstream culture, shorter skirts made of denim are commonly worn by teenagers and young adults.

Some skirts are modelled after the style of jeans, with a front fly, belt loops and back pockets. Others are constructed more like other types of skirts, with a column of front button, closures on the side or back or elastic waists. Like jeans, denim skirts vary in shades of blue, ranging from very pale to very dark, or occasionally in other colors. During winter and colder months, denim skirts are often worn with leggings or tights.

== History ==
In the 1960s, hippies first came up with the idea of recycling old denim jeans into long denim skirts, by opening the inseams, and inserting pieces of triangular denim (or any other fabric) in the front and, unless a tall slit in back is preferred, also in the back of the opened-up trousers.

Denim skirts were first introduced in mainstream fashion lines in the 1970s. In the 1980s, denim miniskirts—with a pencil skirt silhouette—became a popular teenage fashion. They were initially in darker blues, but eventually pinstripes (light blue on darker blue, red on black) and acid wash. The trend faded in the late 1980s when knit miniskirts were dominant.

Denim miniskirts re-emerged in the latter portion of the 1990s. Marnie Bjornson, a well-known figure in the Reykjavik style scene, is credited with reinvigorating the denim skirt in 1996. The same year, Pamela Anderson wore a light washed denim skirt in a promotional photo shoot for the film Barb Wire. The denim miniskirt of the early 21st century was shorter than its 1980s counterpart.

In the late part of the 2000s to early 2010s, it was popular for short denim skirts to be worn with capri length leggings and ballet flats sometimes with socks or sometimes sneakers with socks or Sperrys boat shoes.
