= Hook-and-eye closure =

Traditional type of fastener

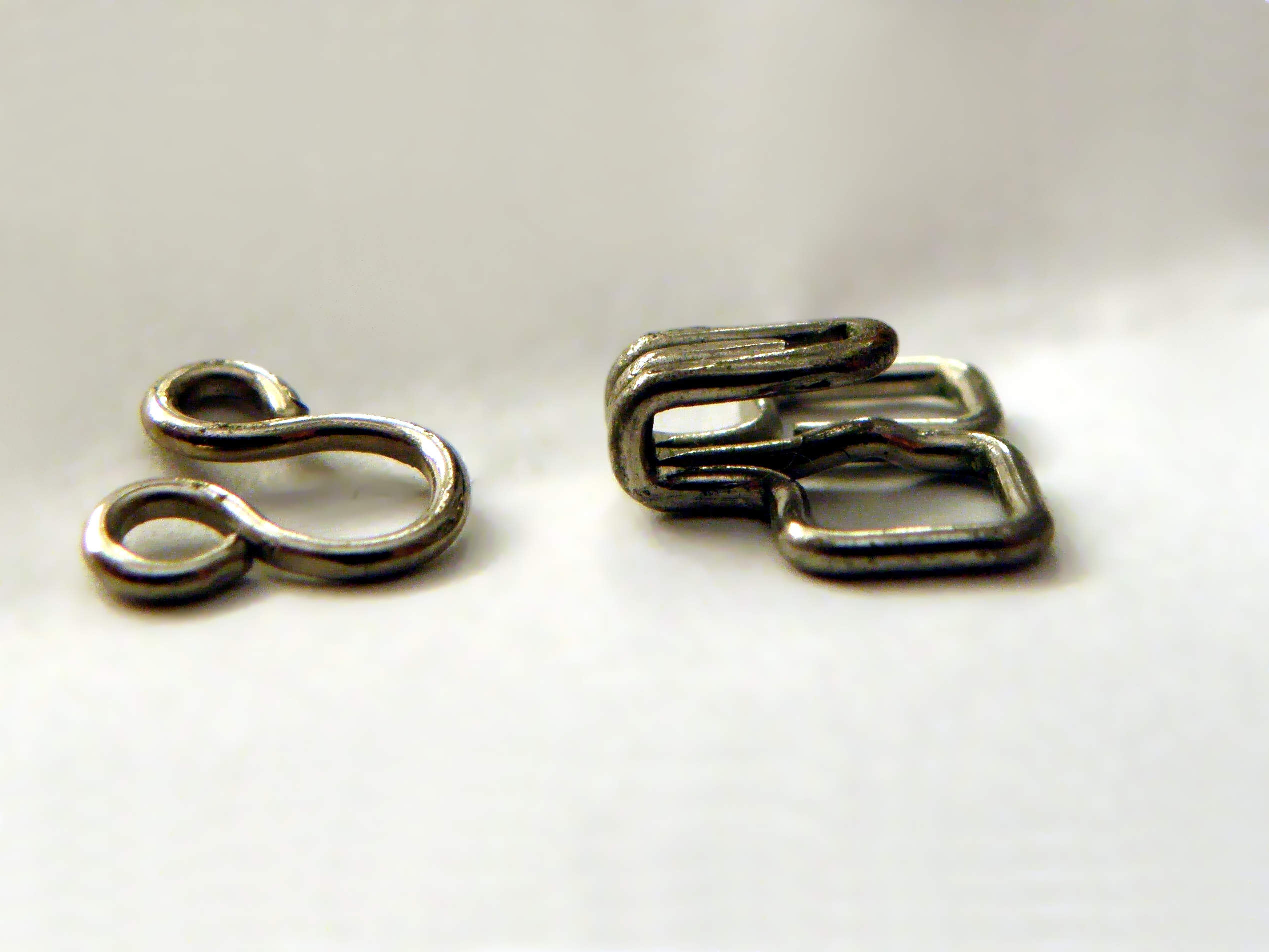
Hook and eye clasp

A hook-and-eye closure is a simple and secure method of fastening garments together. It consists of a metal hook, commonly wire bent to shape, and an eye (or "eyelet") of the same material into which the hook fits.

== History ==
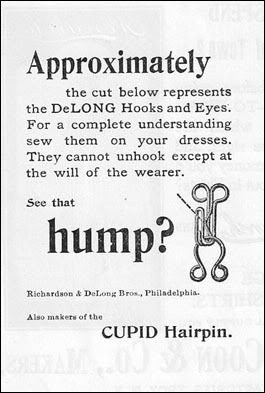
1898 Richardson & Delong Bros. advertisement

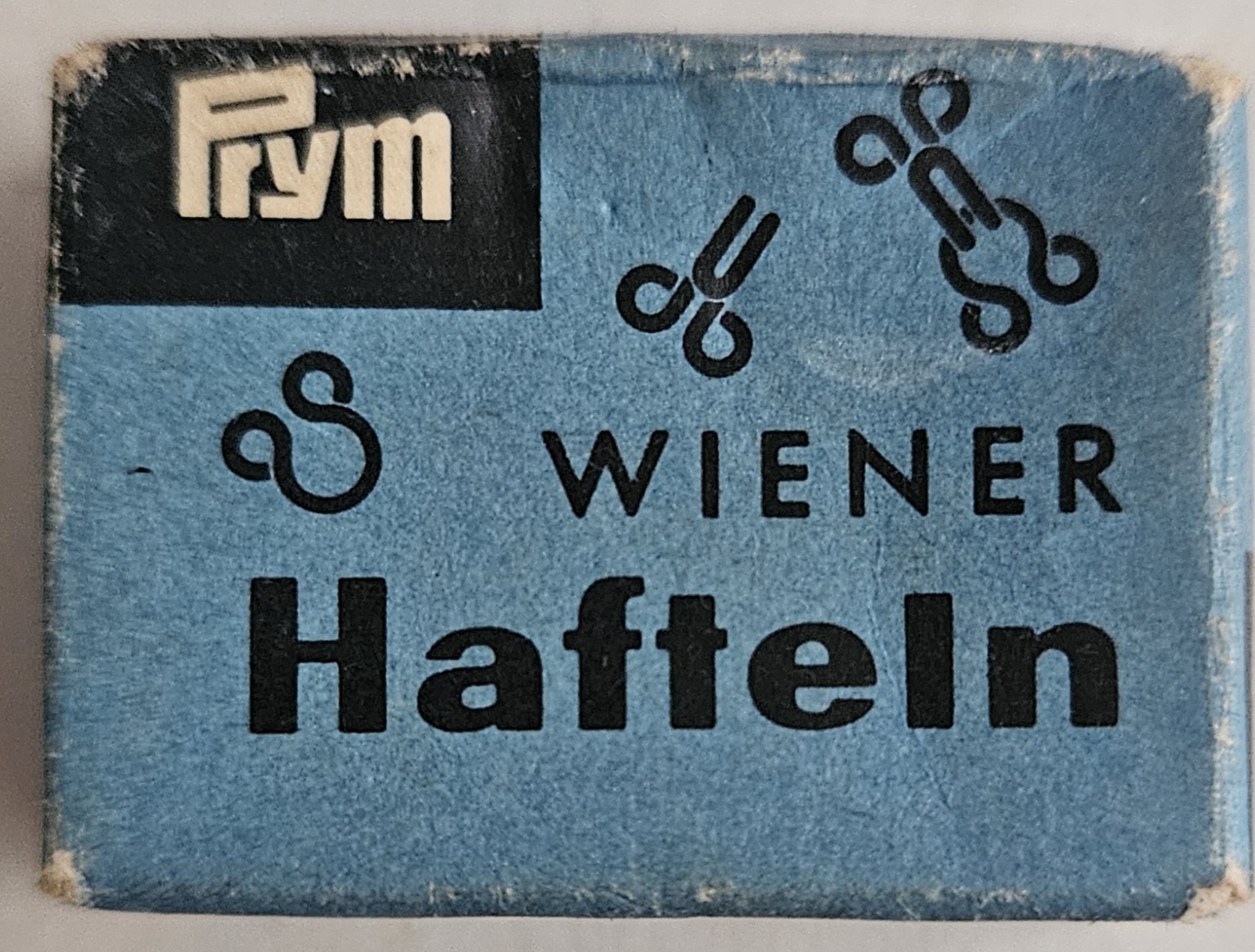
Box of Hook-and-eye closures, manufactured by Prym in Vienna around 1970

The hook and eye closure has a long history and is still used today, primarily on bras.

This form of fastening first appears under the name of "crochet and loop" in 14th-century England, or just "crochet loops" later.

The first reference to the modern term appears in Aubrey's Brief Lives in 1697, which describes a doublet and breeches being attached with "hook and eies". Hooks and eyes were made by hand from wire, until the town of Redditch, England, already famous for sewing needle manufacture, was the first to machine-manufacture them. In 1643 a woman in the American colony of Maryland is recorded as having paid £10 worth of tobacco for hooks and eyes.

The hook and eye played an important role in women's corsetry; used in rows or as a busk, they can take the stress necessary to support the bust and are used for a lady to be able to independently fasten her corset at the front rather than one's only option being to lace it at the back.

=== 19th century ===
It was not until the first part of the 19th century that the industry was furthered in the United States. In 1830, one of the innovators in mass-producing hooks and eyes was Henry North of New Britain, Connecticut; he commissioned a man in Hartford named Levi Lincoln to make a machine that automated the creation of these fasteners.

One variation of the attachment incorporates a "Delong hump", patented in 1889 by the Richardson & Delong Hook and Eye Company of Philadelphia, Pennsylvania. This was a raised elevation or "hump" in the wire hook that prevented the eye from slipping out of the hook, "except at the will of the wearer".

In 1893, Marie Tucek patented the "Breast Supporter" – the first garment similar to the modern-day bra, which used separate pockets for the breasts and straps that went over the shoulder and fastened by hook-and-eye closures to the center front of the garment.

=== 20th century ===
E.C. Beecher patented his hook-and-eye in June 1900 with the U.S. Patent Office; in 1902, an updated version was submitted that consisted of an attachable hook-and-eye, without any stitching required. A similar hook and eye for brassieres was patented in 1902 by the M.E. Company.

The fasteners were eventually manufactured in the form of hook-and-eye tape, consisting of two tapes, one equipped with hooks and the other equipped with eyelets so that the two tapes could be "zipped" together side by side. To construct the garment, sections of hook-and-eye tape were sewn into either side of the garment closure. Today this labor-saving method comes on either silk or cotton tape, depending on the firmness and strength needed.

=== 21st century ===
To keep up with the modern machine-oriented production environment, hook-and-eye closures are sold both individually and as a ready-to-cut tape. Ready-to-cut tapes are seen mostly in underwear such as bras. The metal part of the closures also comes in stainless steel, nylon-coated wires or brass in quality products.

== Usage ==
In addition to their application on brassieres, bustiers, corsets and other fine lingerie, a single hook-and-eye closure is often sewn above the top of the zipper to "finish" it and take stress off the fastening on a skirt, dress or pants. They are generally provided at one gross to a box and range in size from No. 1 small, to No. 10 large.
