= Hat shelf =

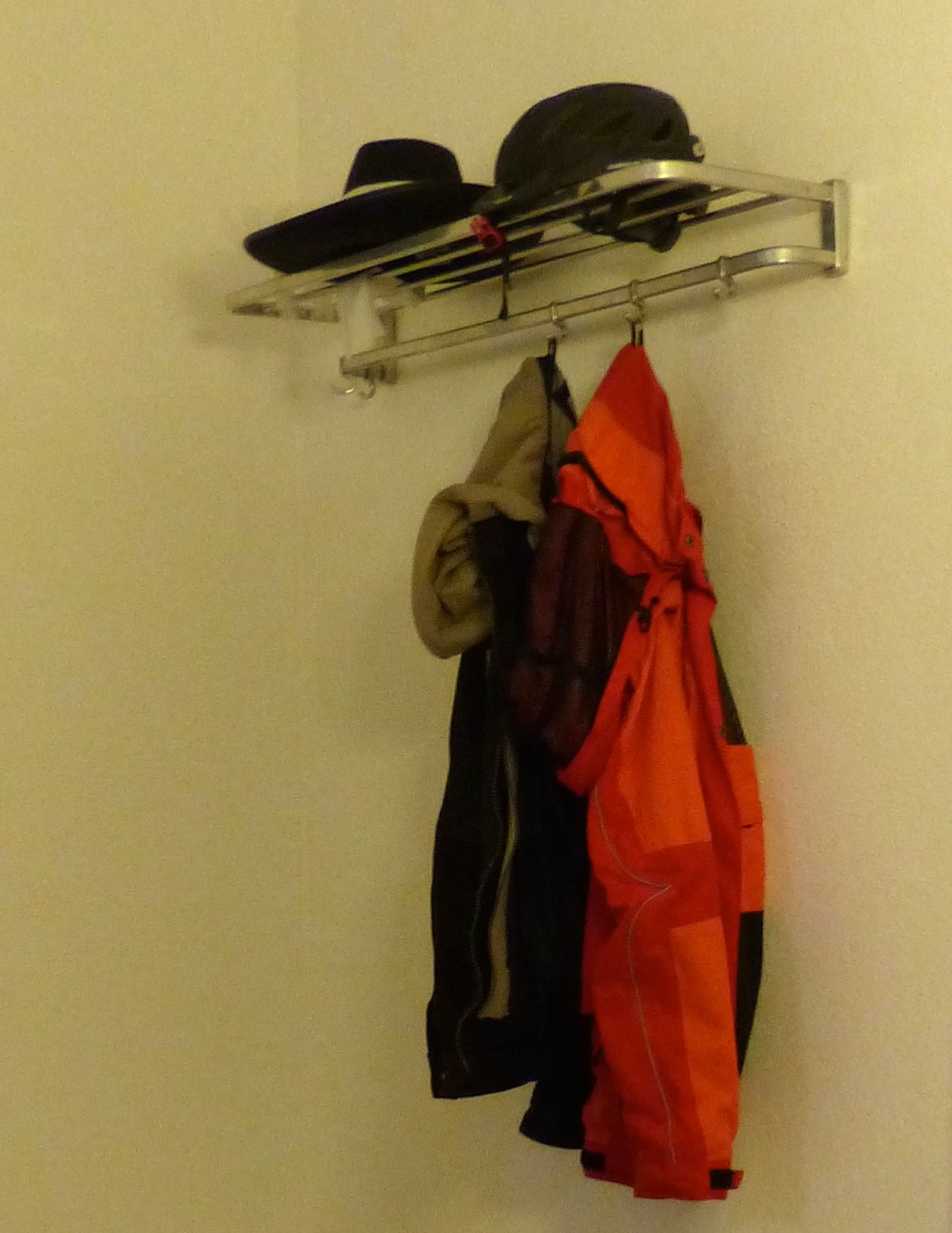
Hat rack with bars on top, with a hat and a bicycle helmet on top. On the underside there are clothes hooks for hanging clothes directly.

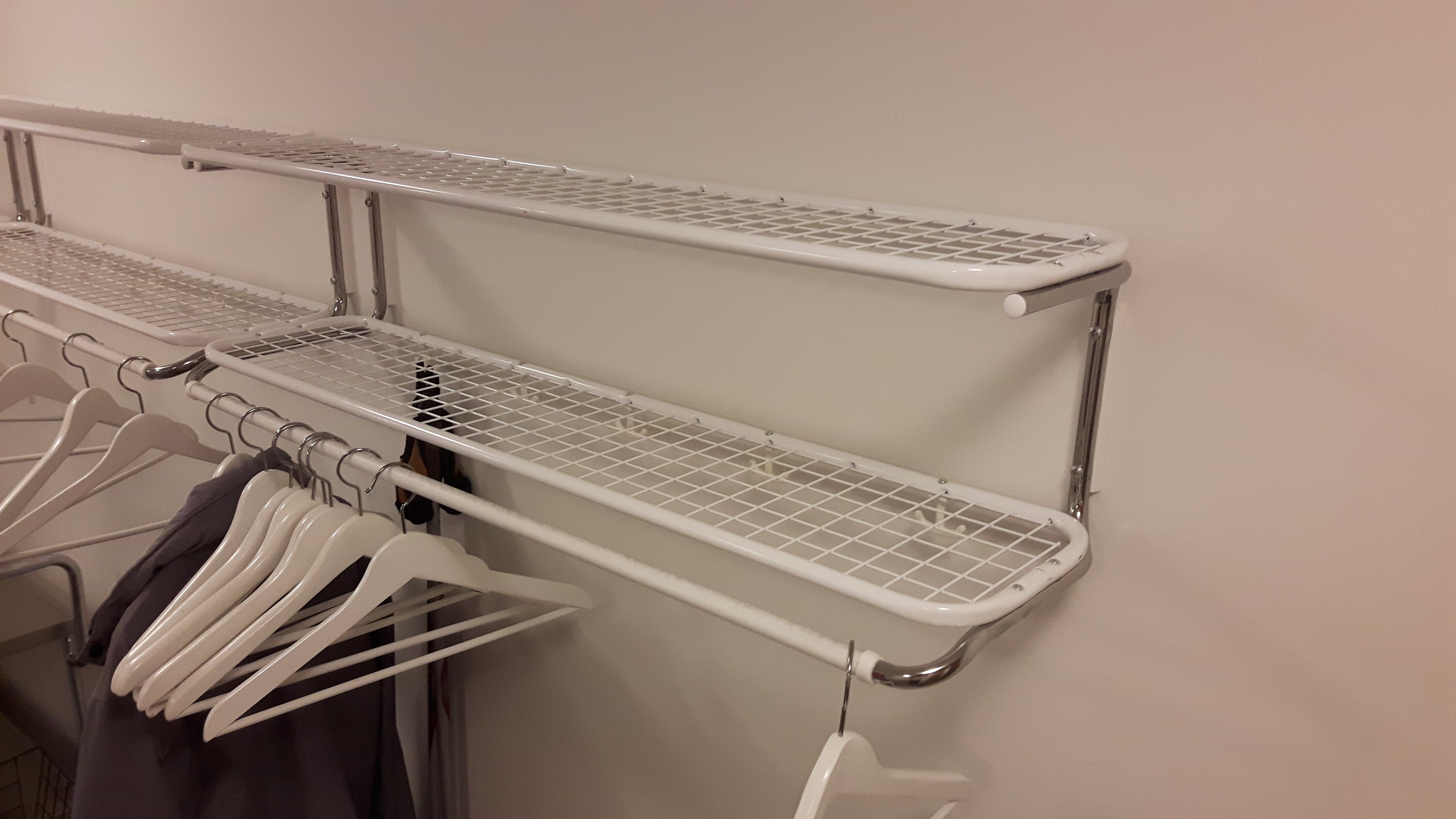
Hat rack with mesh on top so that items are visible from below. On the underside there is a clothes rail for hanging clothes using clothes hangers.

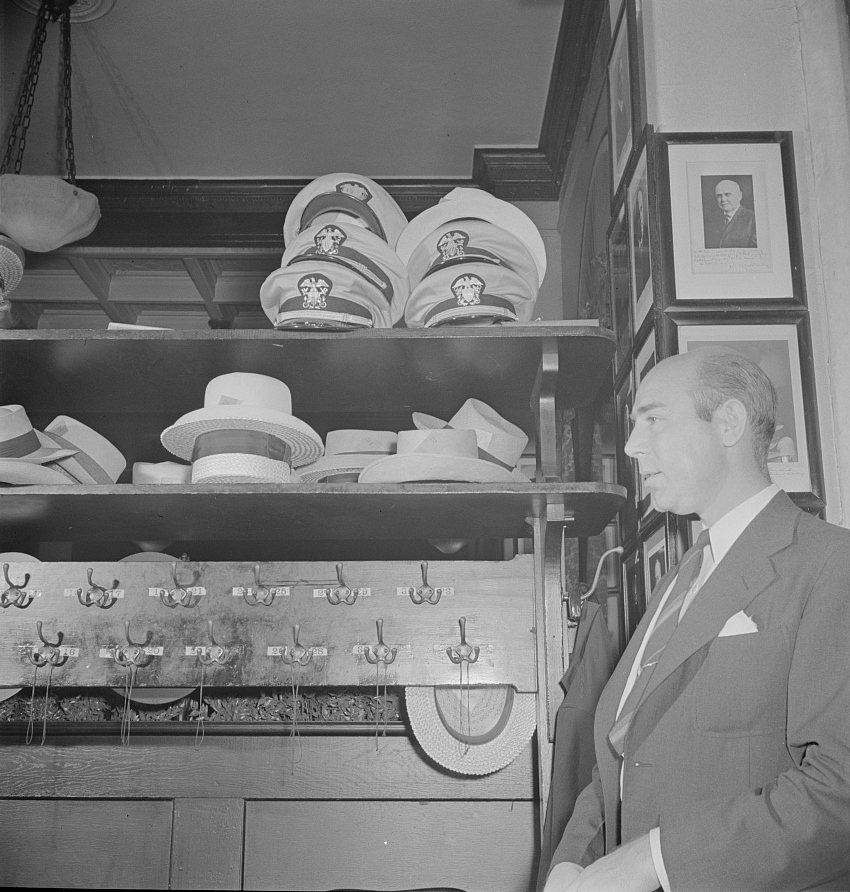
A hat rack in 1942, above a row of wardrobe hooks

A hat shelf or hat rack is a shelf for storing hats, knit caps, and other small items, such as umbrellas, retroreflectors, or helmets. They are often found in entrance areas or cloakrooms in buildings, and are often mounted high, such as above 170 cm or 180 cm, at head height or above head height. Hat shelves can make use of the space under the ceiling, and can free up floor space.

Under hat shelves there is often a set of clothes hooks or a clothes rail where outerwear and other clothing are hung. This can be either a separate part or an integrated part of the hat shelf (for example, a combined hat shelf and coat rack).

== Similar concepts in transportation ==
In various means of transport, such as trains and airplanes, overhead compartments have a similar design to hat shelves, but are instead commonly used to store hand luggage. In several languages such shelves are literally known as "hat shelves" for historical reasons (for instance in German Hutablage meaning "hat storage", or Norwegian hattehylle meaning "hat shelf").

Many cars, especially sedans and hatchbacks, have a hatch above the trunk between the rear window and the rear seat called a "parcel shelf" in English. These are also known as "hat shelves" in several languages (e.g. Hutablage in German or hattehylle in Norwegian). Originally they were intended for storing headgear such as hats or caps, but much like glove compartments are used for items other than gloves their use has changed. In car tuning, parcel shelves are often modified by fitting them with loudspeakers for the audio system.

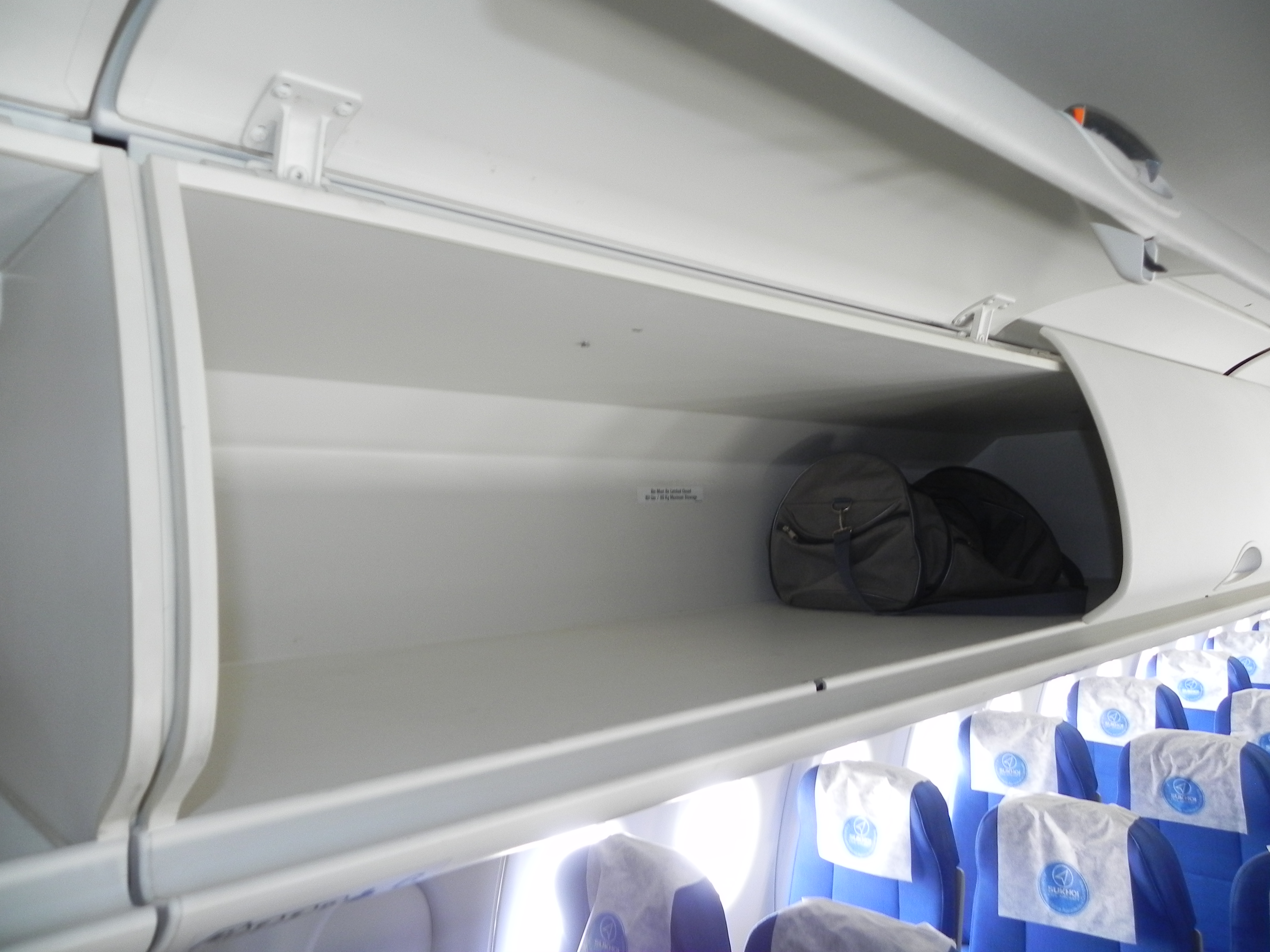
Overhead compartment aboard a SSJ100

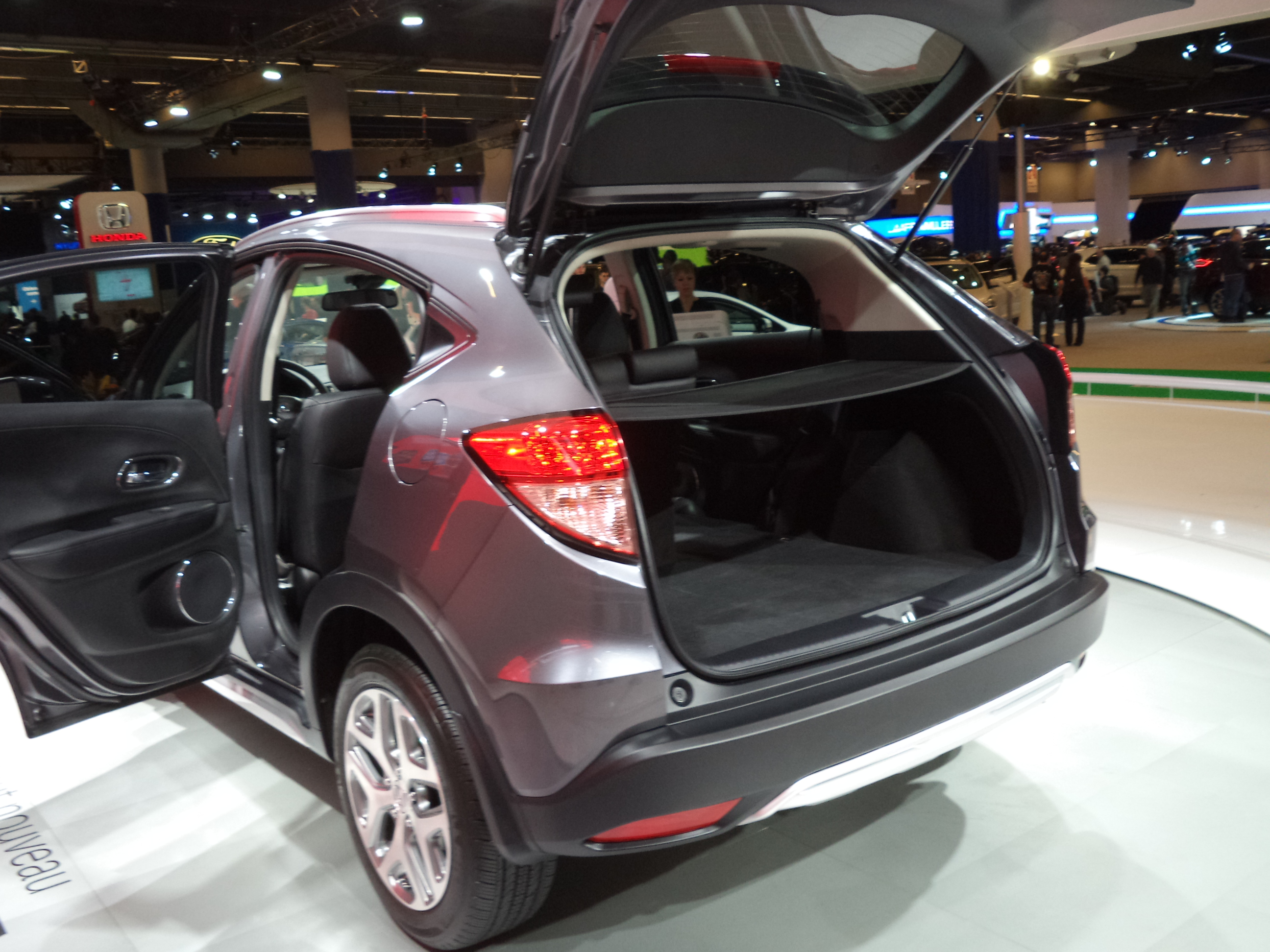
Parcel shelf over the trunk of a car

== See also ==
- Cloakroom, storage place for outerwear clothes
- Clothes rail, a rod or piece of furniture used in wardrobes to hold clothes hangers
- Clothes valet, type of hanger for hanging clothes for daily use, especially a suit to be worn the next day
- Clothes hanger, a device for hanging clothes, designed after human shoulders
- Overhead storage, space-saving storage that frees up floor space and utilizes room volume
- Wardrobe hook, hook for directly hanging clothing for quick and easy storage
