= Locker loop =

Loop attached to a garment so that it can be more easily hung for storage

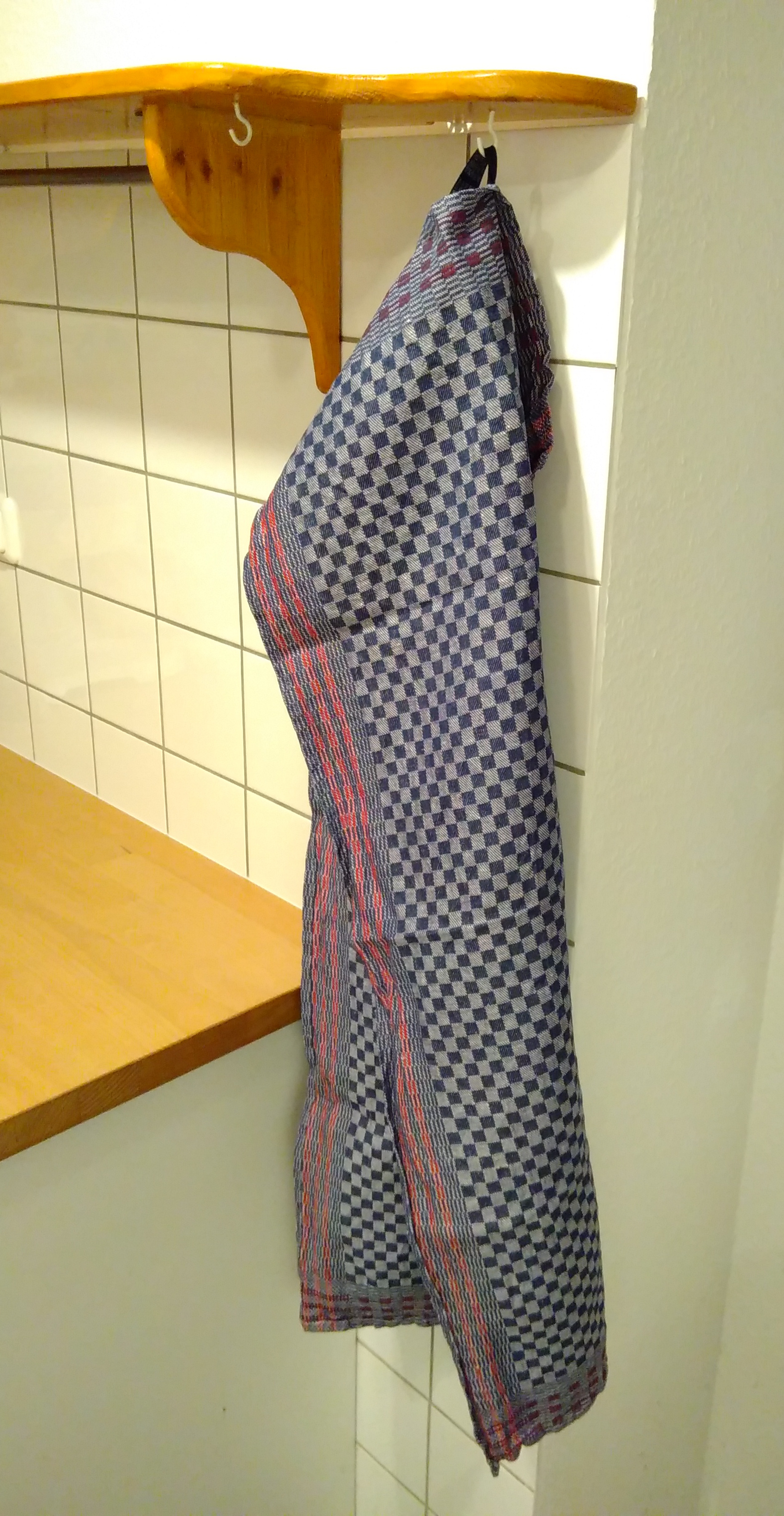
Kitchen towel hanging from a hook

A locker loop is a loop attached to a garment or other object to make it easier to hang it up for storage, such as to hang it on a clothes hook. They are often found on clothing such as sweaters, jackets, dress shirts, etc., as well as on textiles such as towels and on some backpacks and handbags.

Loops can make it easier to hang clothes, and hanging clothes as such can prevent them from becoming wrinkled. However, clothes hangers may be preferred for delicate or valuable garments. On such garments, the loops may be intended for short-term use only.

The loop itself can be made of a fabric that is folded and sewn, or of a webbing strap, or of other materials such as artificial leather or metal chains. Often the loop is sewn on, but in some cases it can be attached with a button instead. The name of the clothing manufacturer or retailer is sometimes printed or woven into the loops. Personalized loops with the owner's name can be useful, especially in kindergartens.

In popular culture, the locker loop has been an iconic symbol in Ivy League fashion culture and as a relationship-status signal.

== Gallery ==
=== Household ===
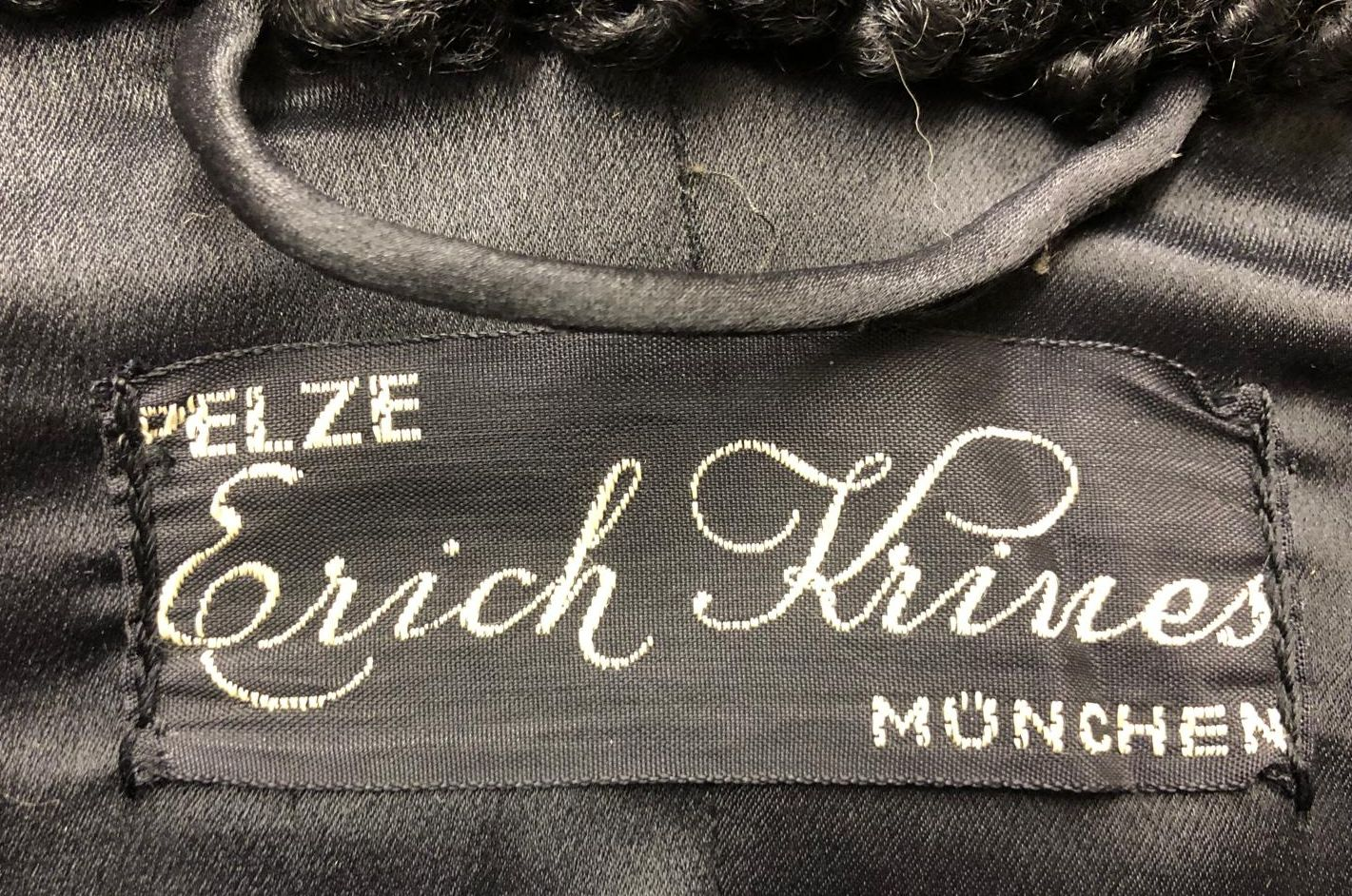
The loop's textile is shaped like a hose

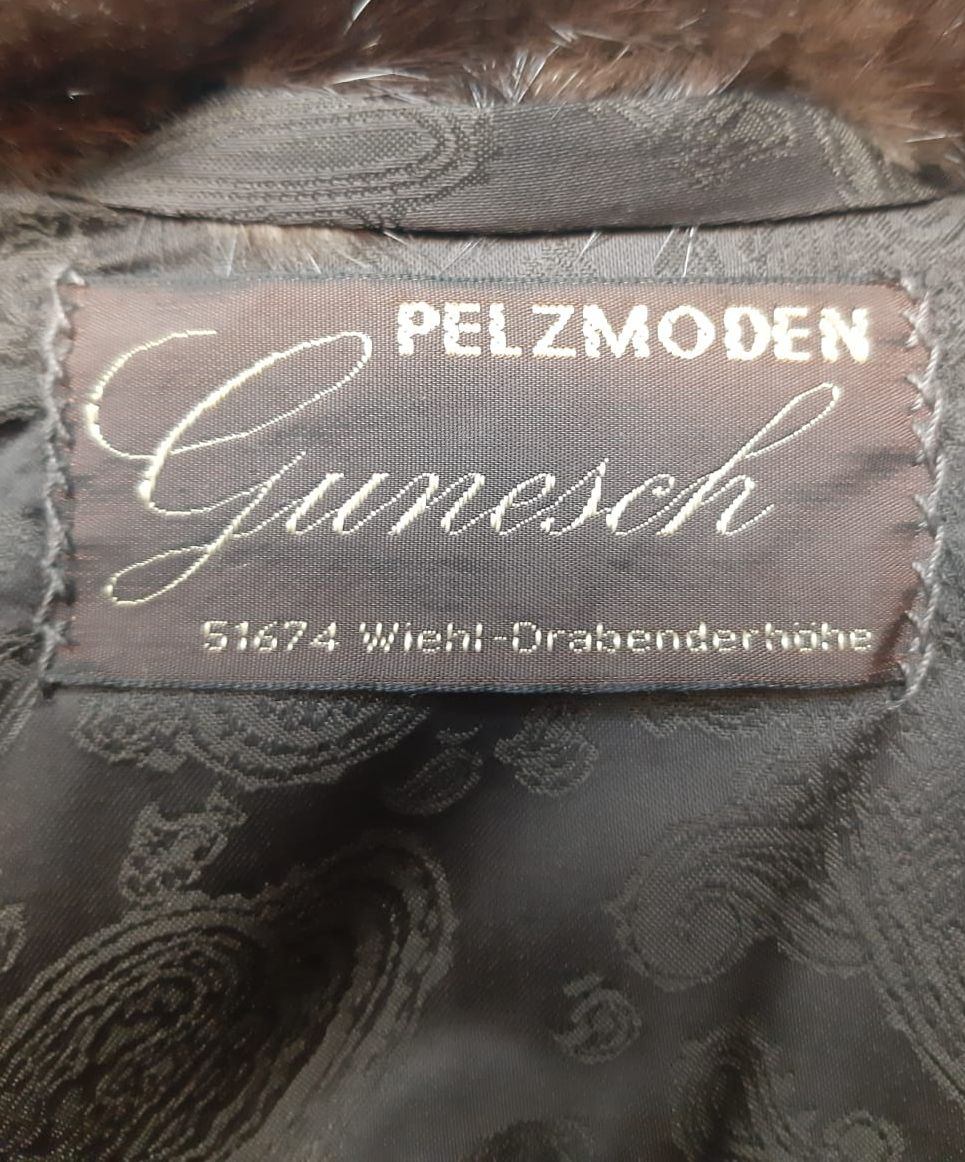
Shaped like a hose and pressed flat

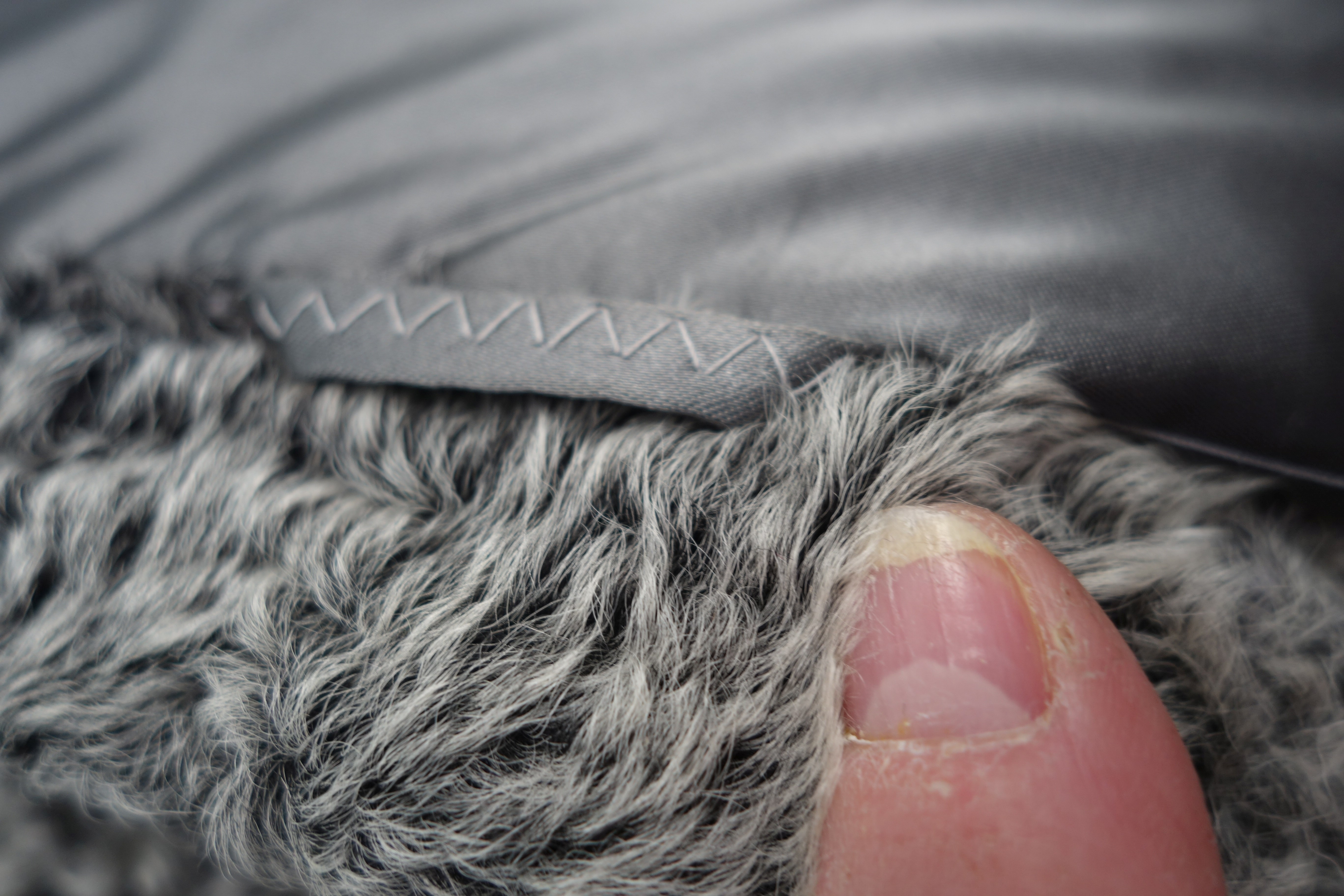
Loop with zigzag stitch

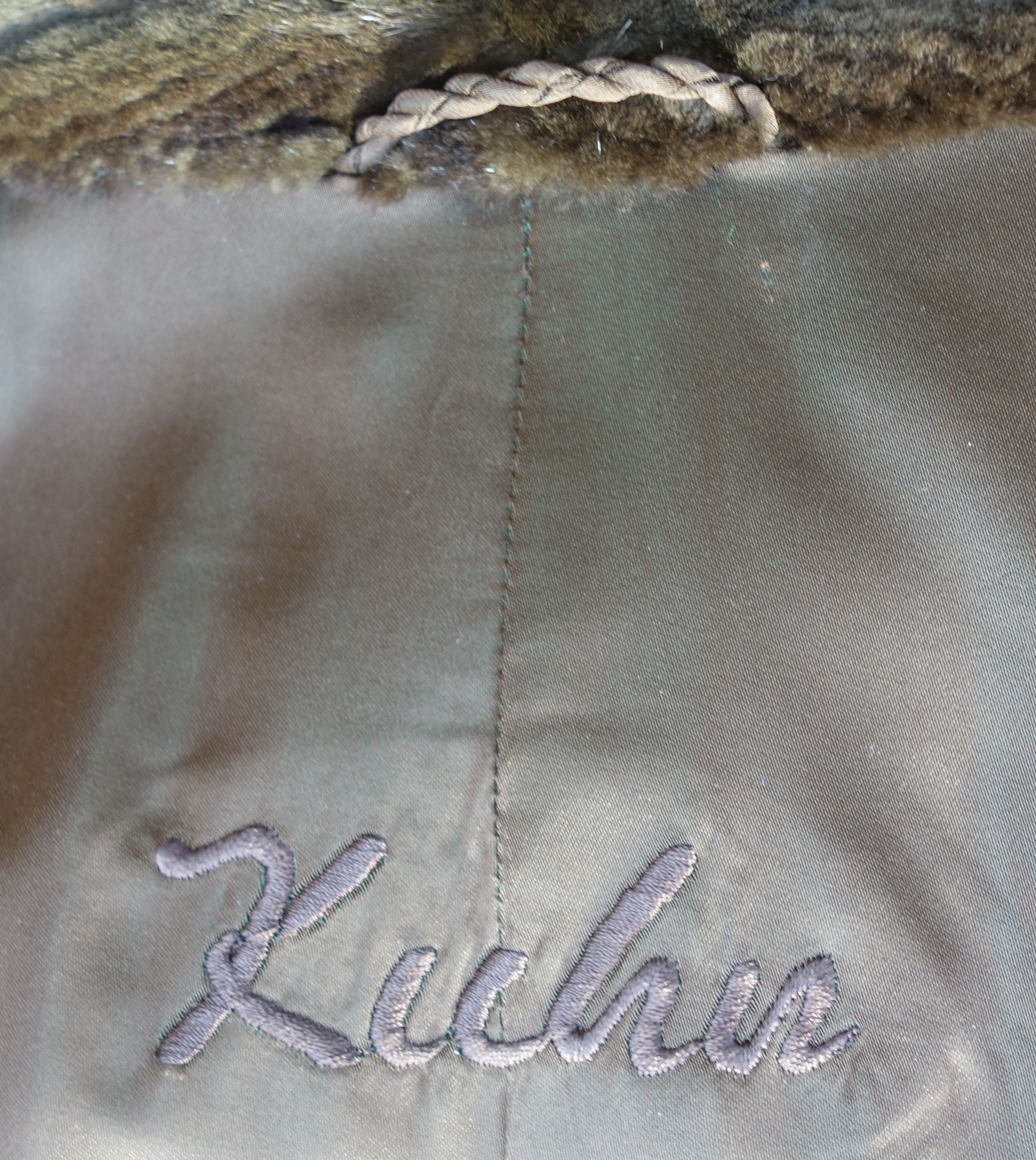
Turned in on itself

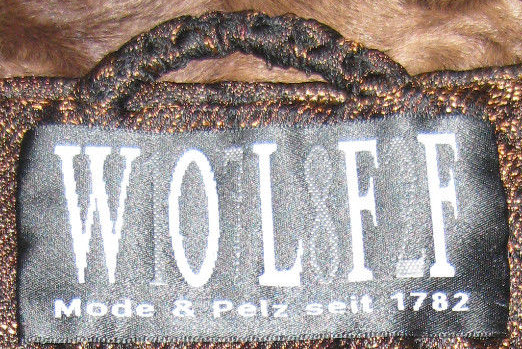
Braided loop

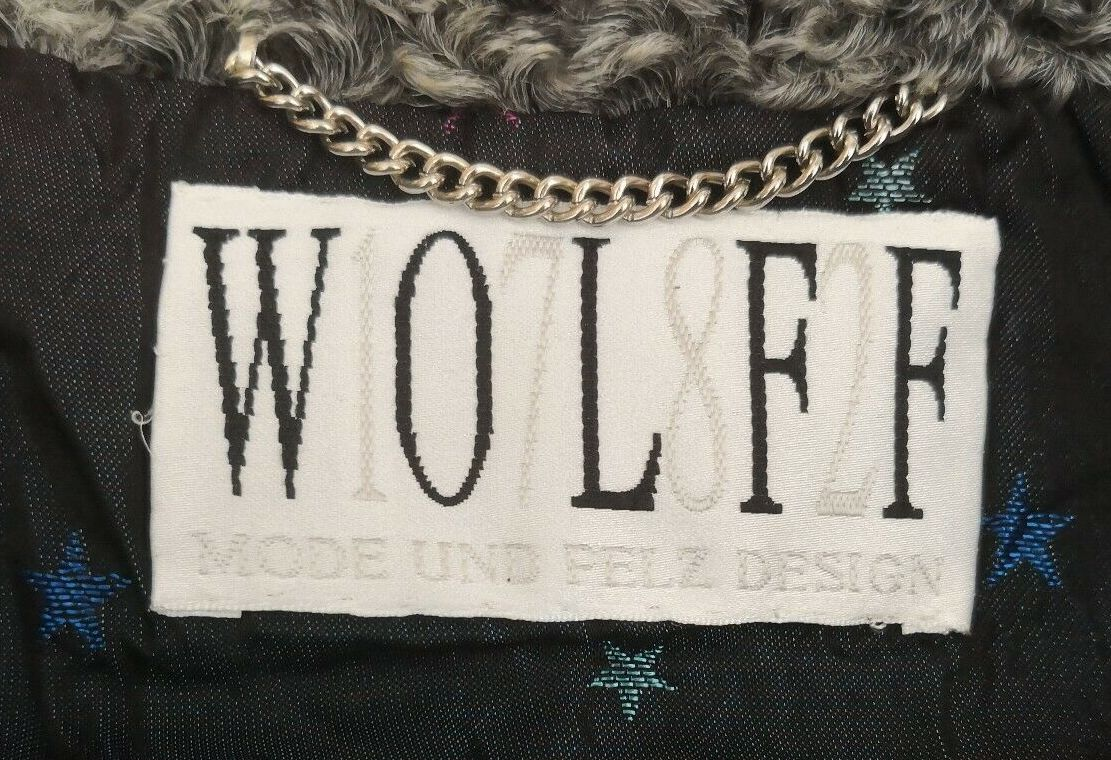
Metal chain

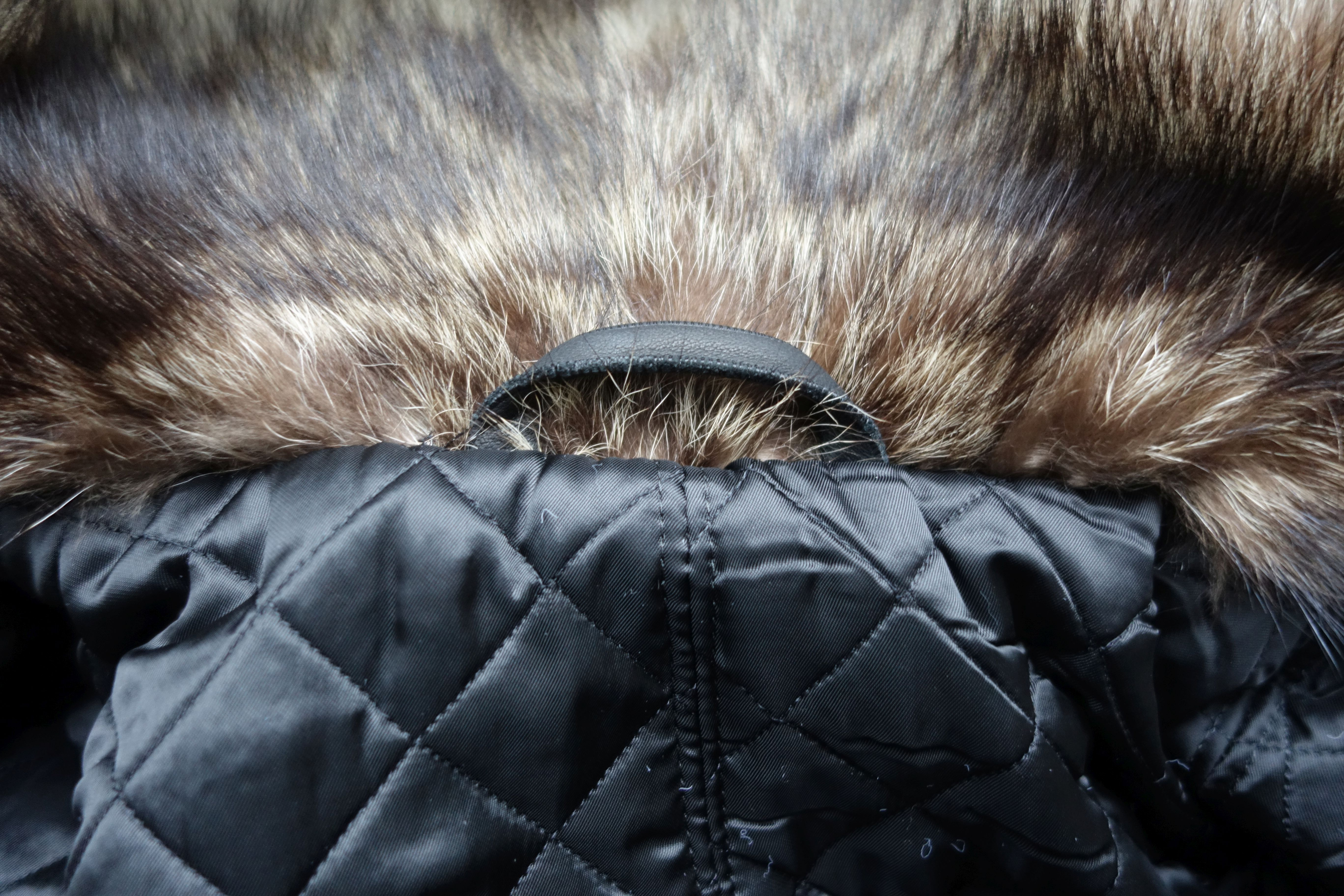
Leather

=== Clothing ===
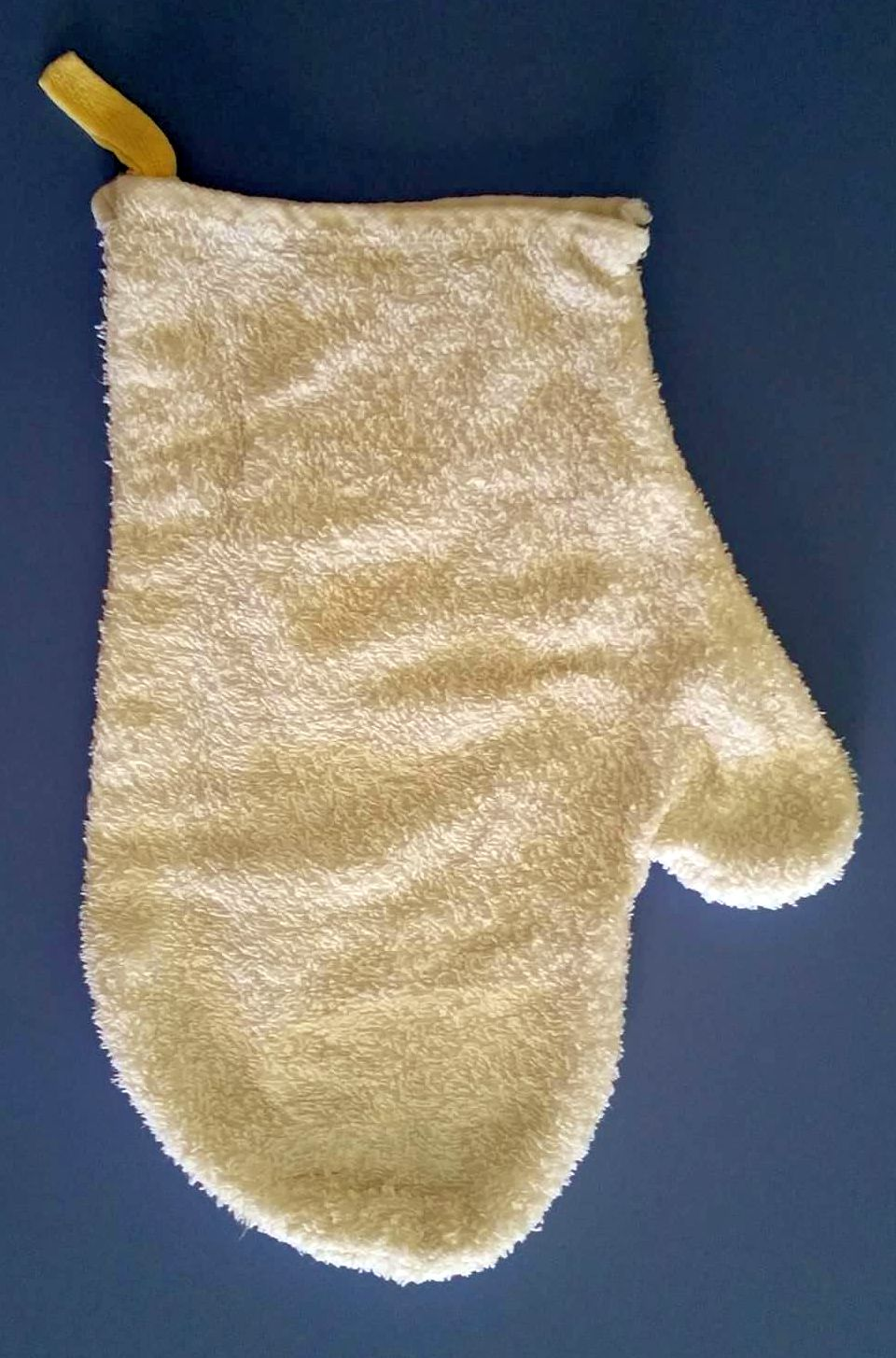
Washcloth with loop

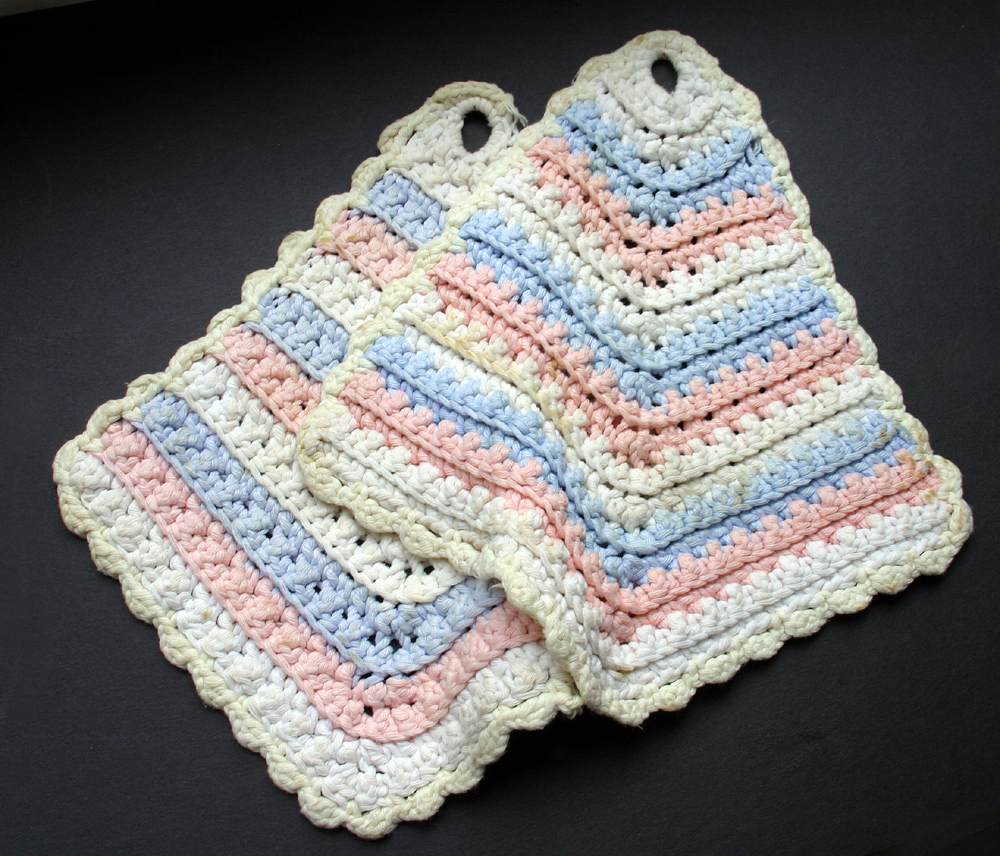
Crocheted potholders

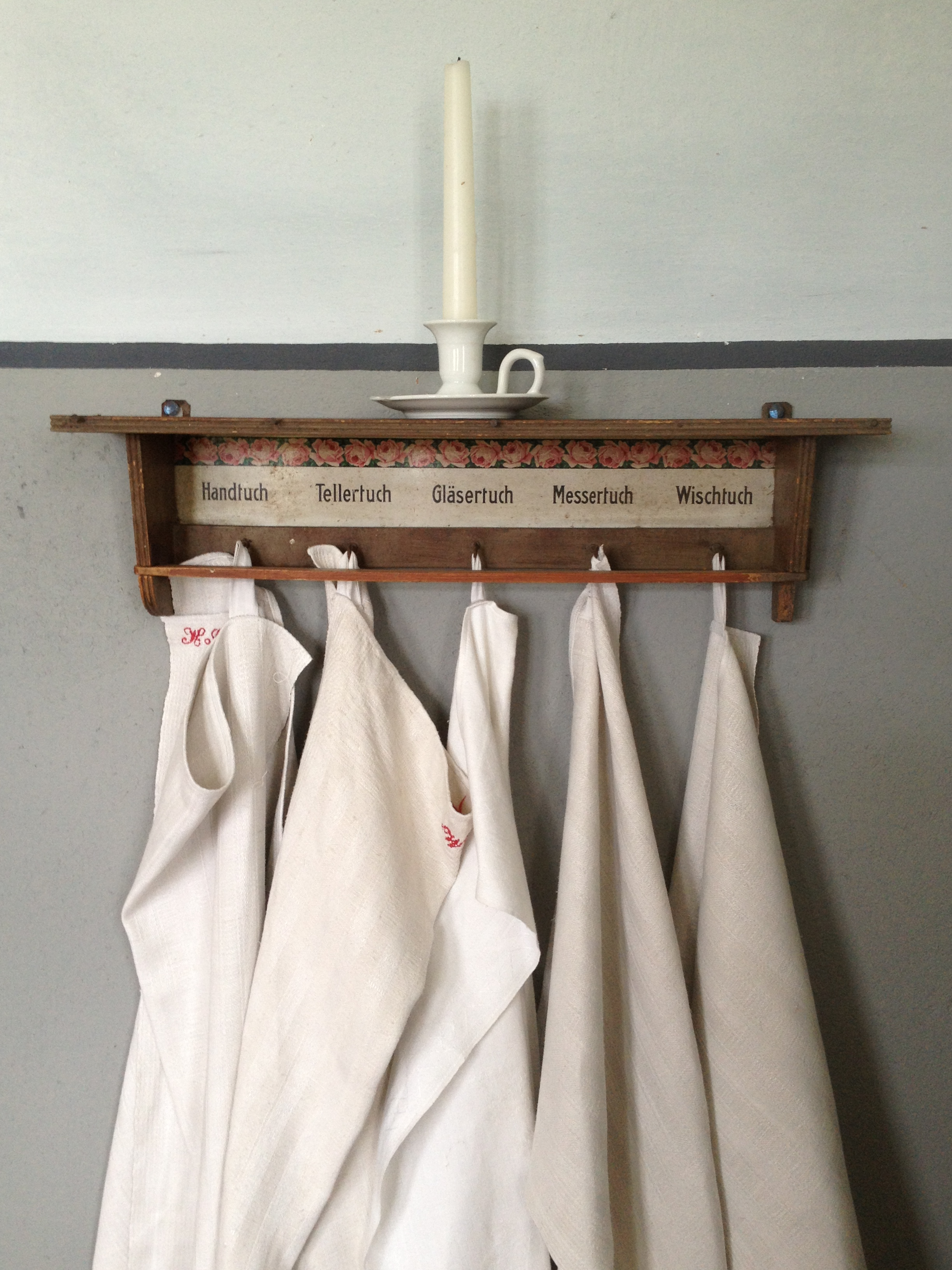
Kitchen towels

=== Seams and variants ===
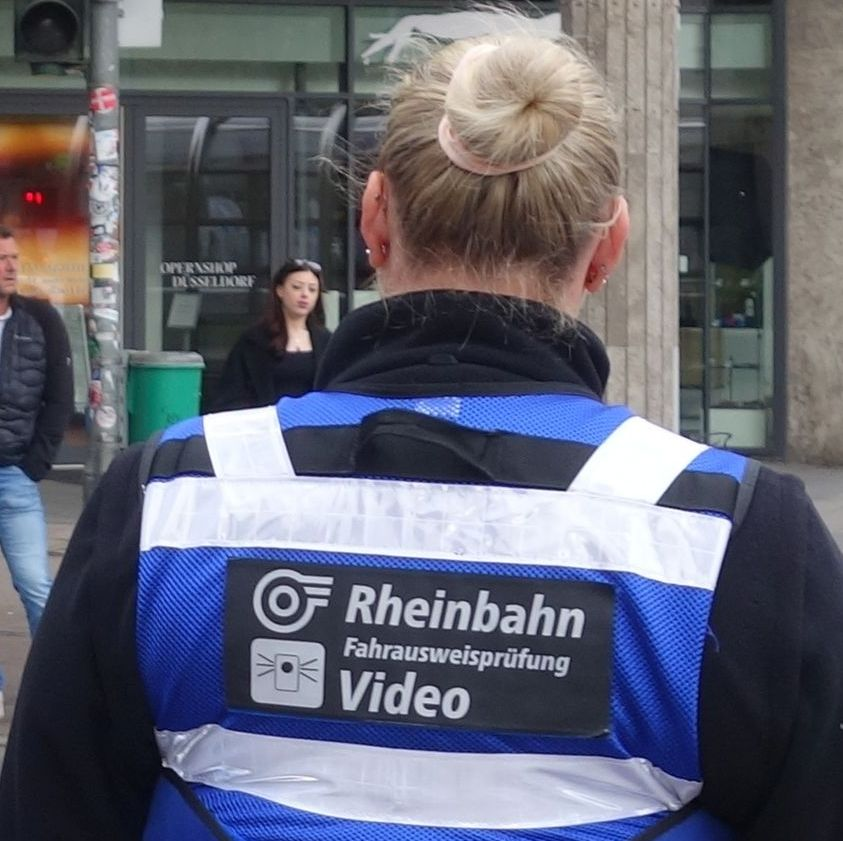
Large loop on the outside of work clothes

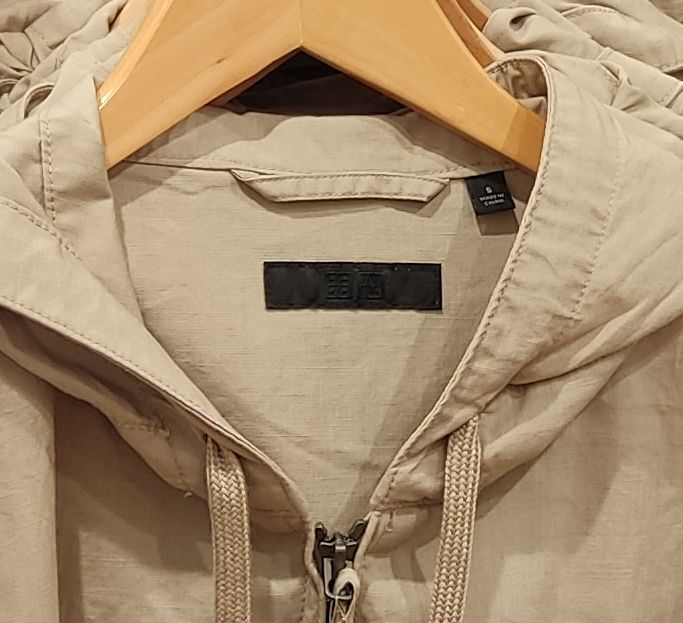
Anorak

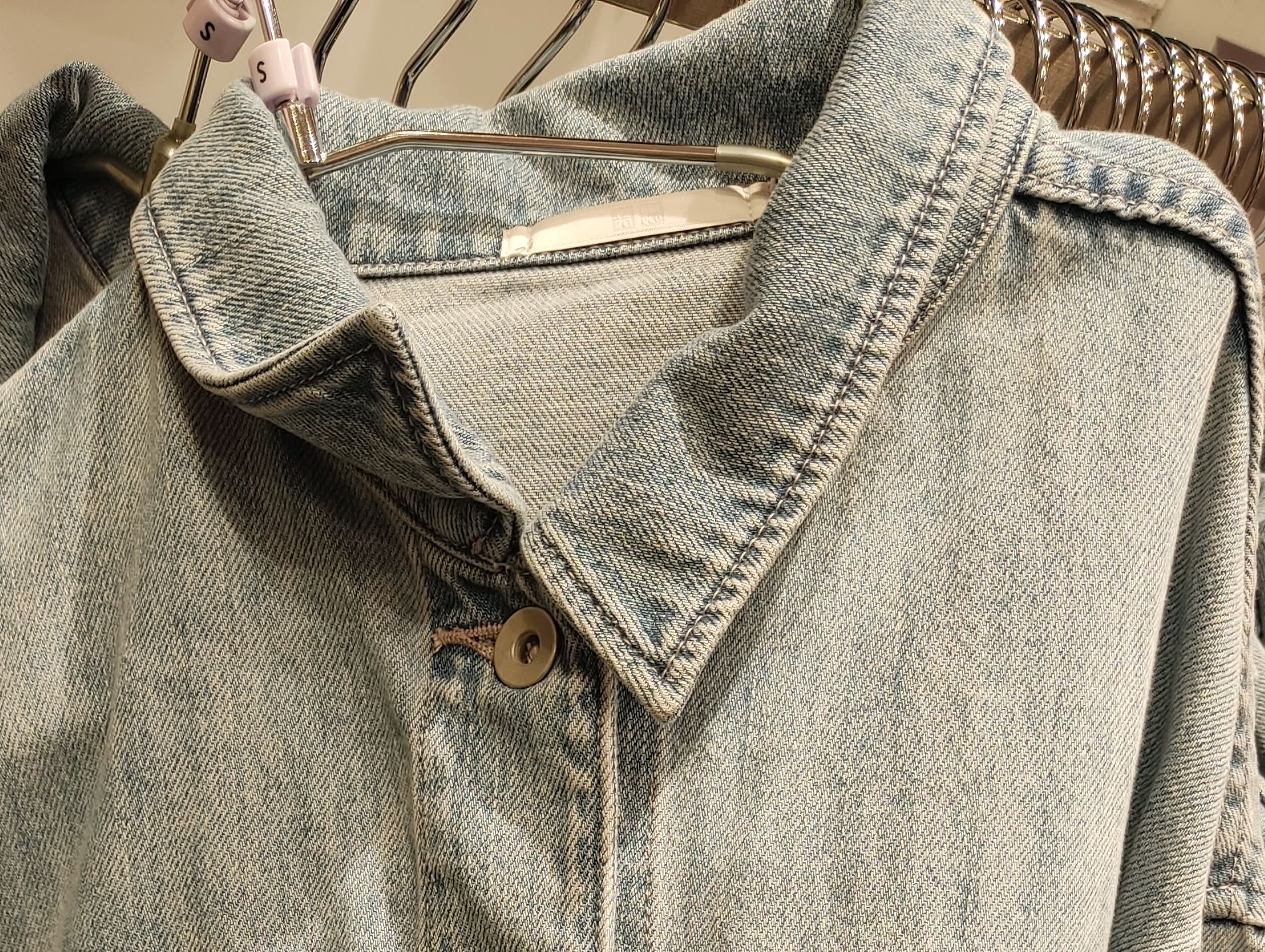
Denim jacket, the loop has the manufacturer's logo

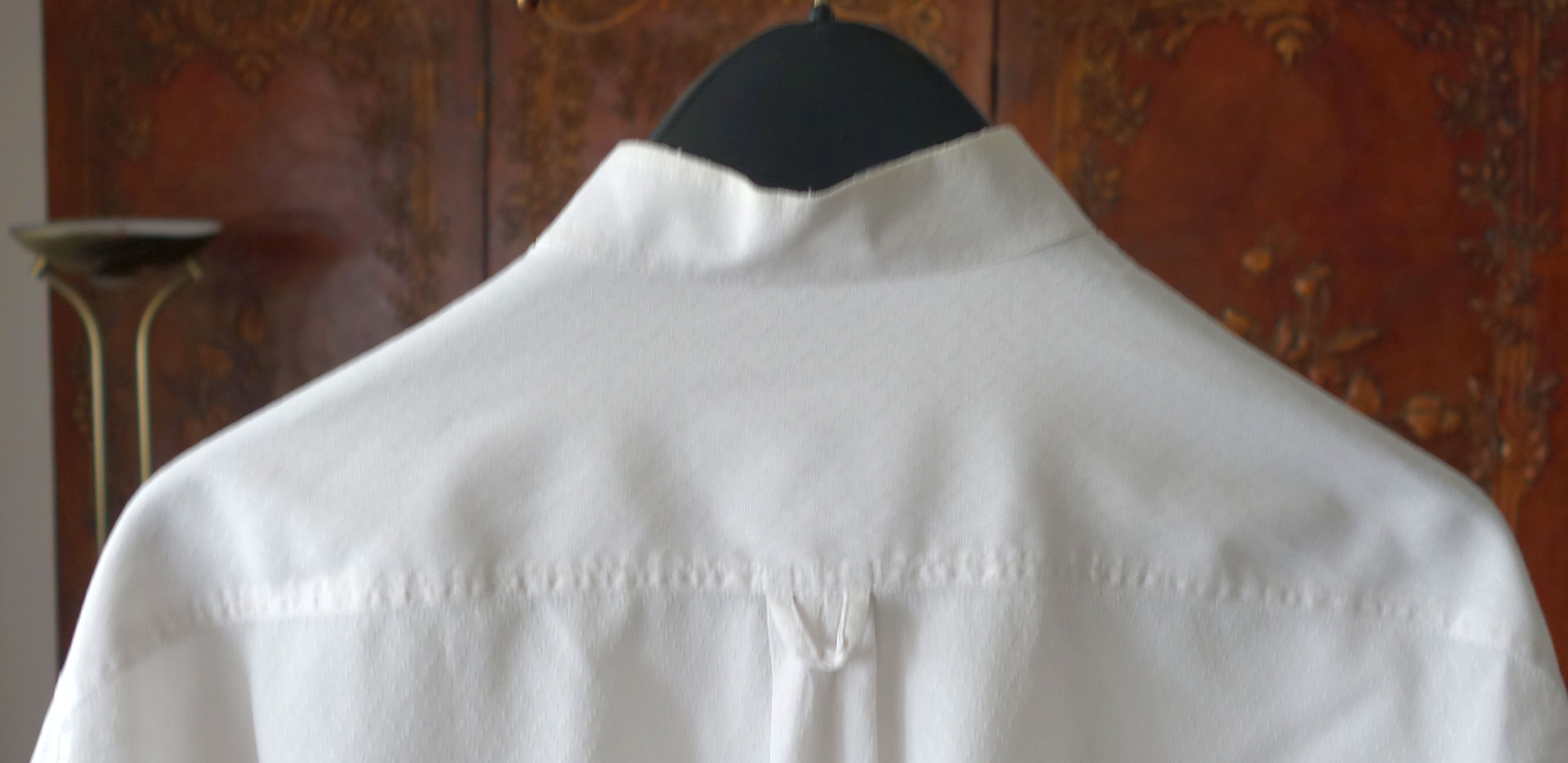
A loop on the outside of a shirt (so-called "locker loop")

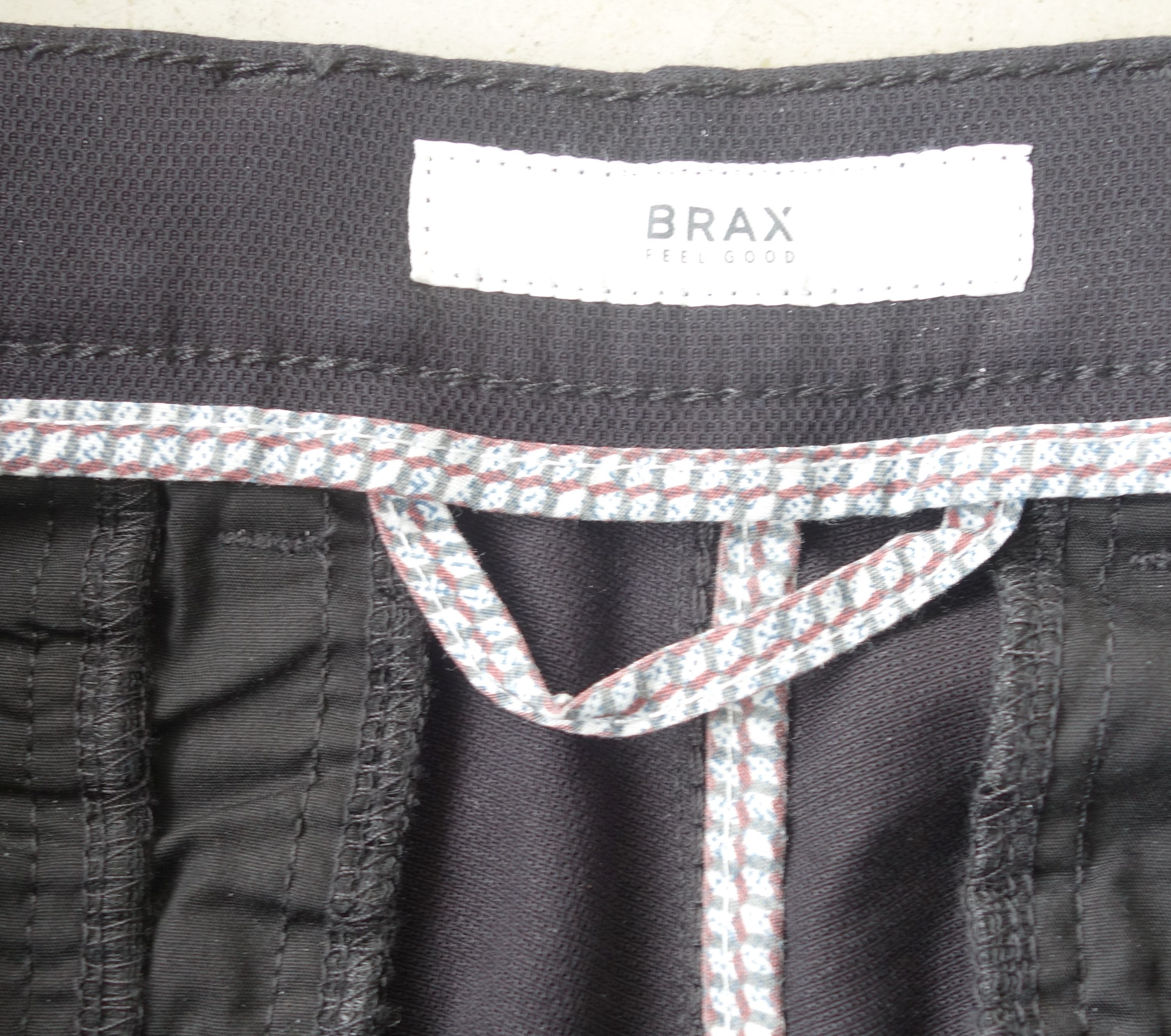
Men's trousers

== See also ==
- Clothes hanger, a device for hanging clothes, designed after human shoulders
- Clothes rail, a rod or piece of furniture used in wardrobes to hold clothes hangers
- Coat rack, fixed or freestanding clothes rack for storing jackets and hats
- Hatstand, shelf mounted high for storing smaller items
- Hook, tool used to grab onto, connect, or attach to something
- Wardrobe hook, a mounting plate with hooks to hang things on, for example from a loop
- Webbing, strongly woven fabric used instead of rope
