= Wardrobe hook =

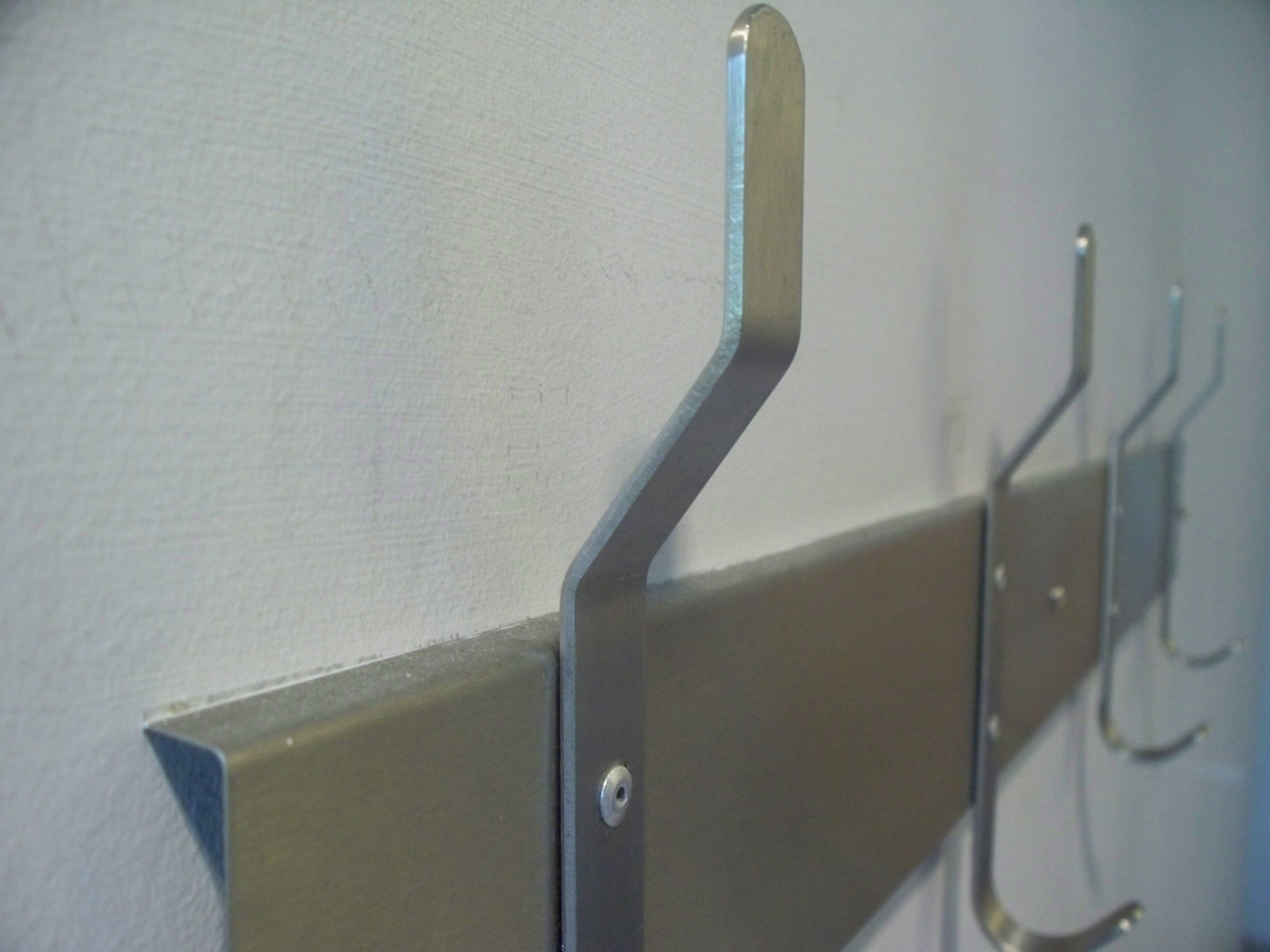
Coat rack with metal hooks

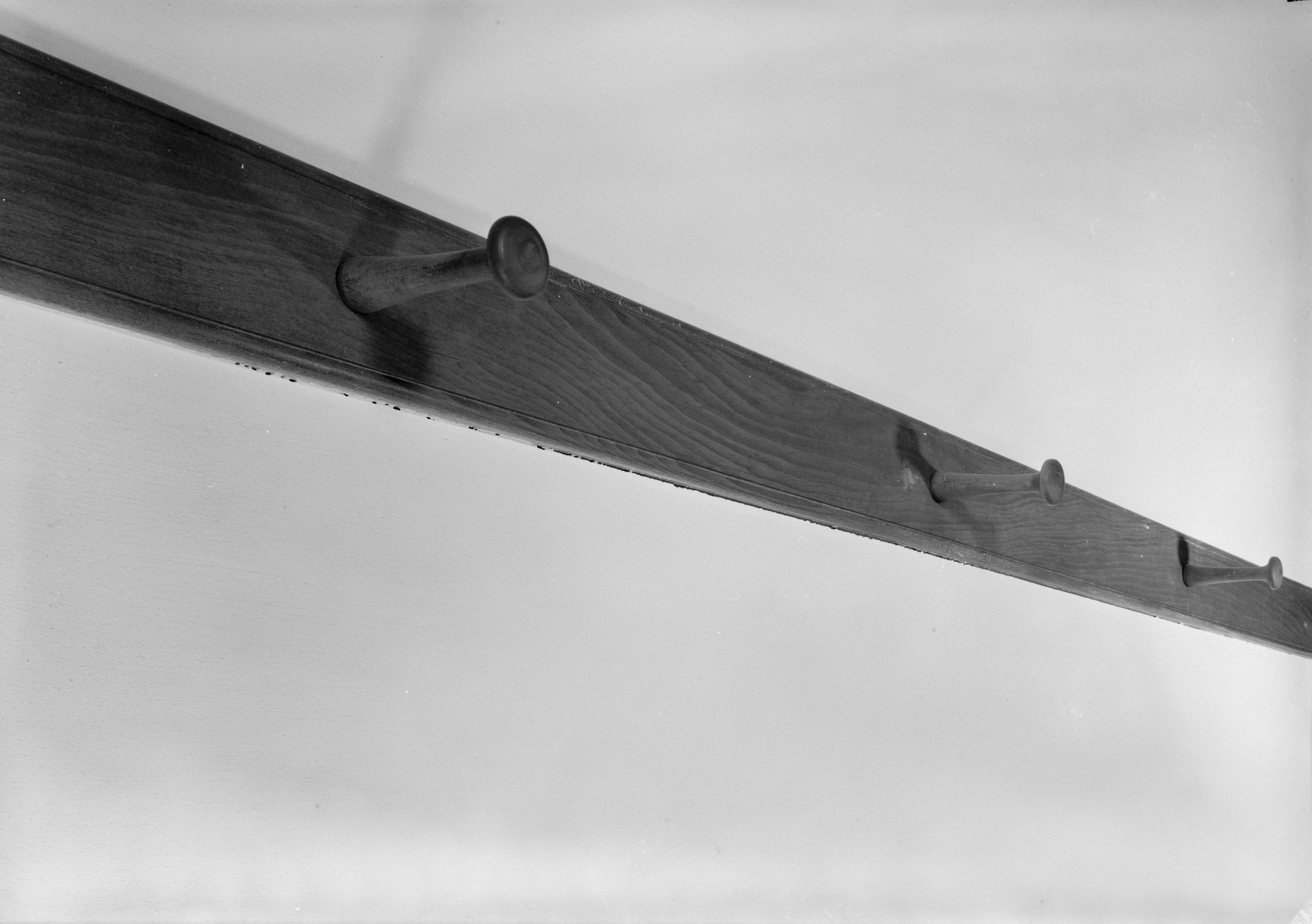
Wooden rack (Shaker furniture style)

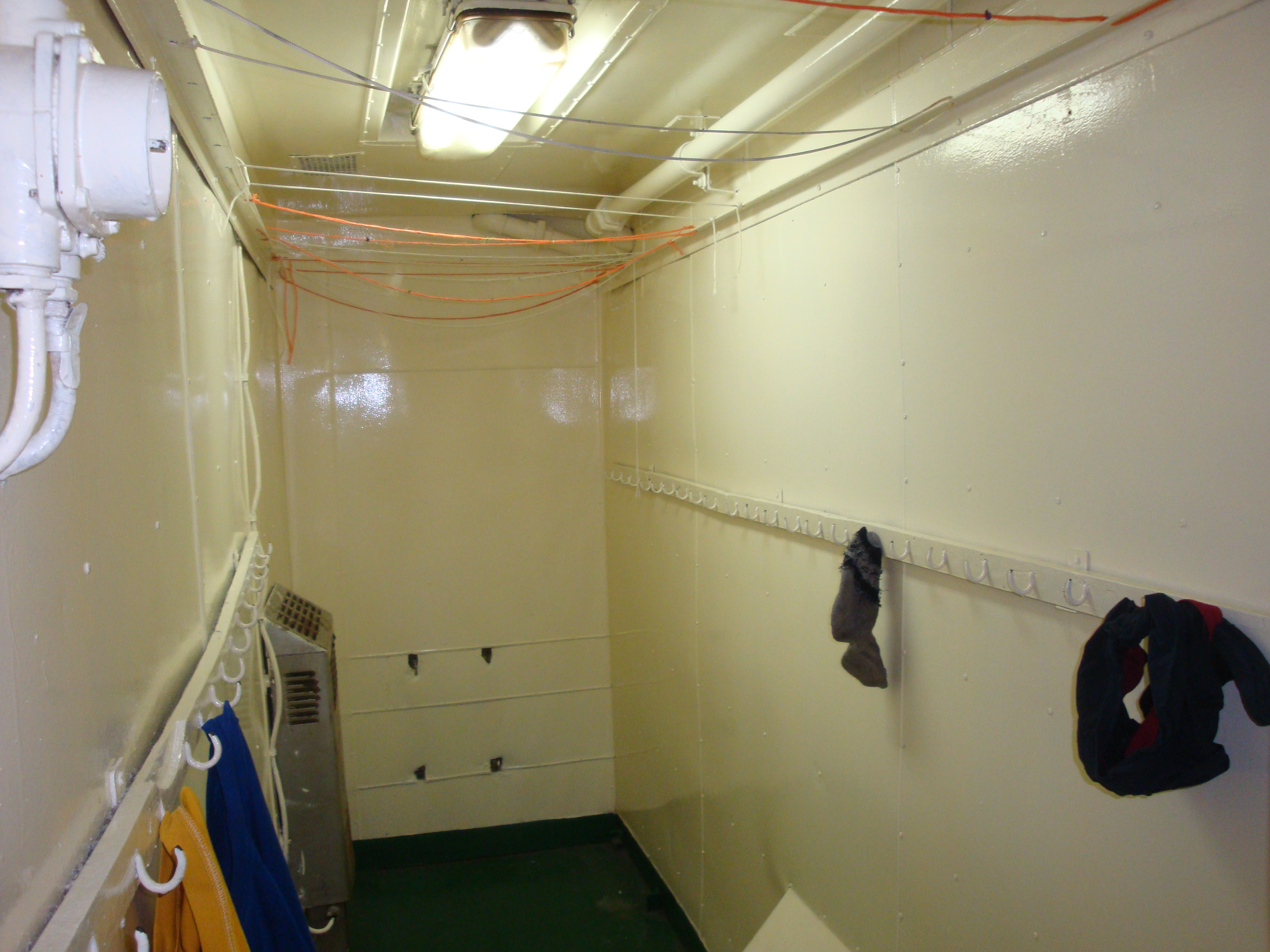
Drying room with clothes hooks on the walls and clotheslines in the ceiling

A clothes hook, wardrobe hook or wall hook is an object designed to directly hang clothing or textiles on a wall or other surface for quick and easy storage. The hooks can be mounted directly to a wall, or via a rack. They are commonly used for jackets, coats, hats and towels, among other things.

The hooks can be designed as pins, hooks, or the like, and can be made of metal, wood or other materials. Hooks can be an alternative to, for example, clothes hangers and clothes rails, for example if it is not of great importance that the clothes keep a certain shape (like the shoulder shape of a clothes hanger), or if the user does not want to take the time and effort to use clothes hangers. The hook should have a design so that items do not easily slip off.

A coat rack or hook rack consists of several pegs or hooks placed next to each other (often mounted on a common mounting plate, usually horizontally), and are commonly used in entryways or changing rooms. Coat hooks mounted around a rack and on freestanding furniture forms the classic coat rack. In a traditional wardrobe, the hooks are often a permanently integrated component, along with the clothes rail used to hang clothes hangers. A wall-mounted rack tends to take up less floor space compared to floor-standing racks. It is not uncommon that people make their own wardrobe rack, for example by mounting hooks on a common piece of lumber. Spacing between the hooks depends on the items being hanged, but can for example fall between 150 and 250 mm.

== Materials and shapes ==
Coat hooks are often made of metal (such as stainless steel), but can also be made of other materials such as wood and plastic. Single hooks can be hung over door leaves, or attached to a wall with wood screws or drywall anchors, or mounted with glue or double-sided tape.

A shaker peg, named after the Shaker communities, is a variant of clothes hooks with a simple, cylindrical shape, traditionally installed on a rail, used to hang items like coats, hats, tools, and towels.

== Mounting ==
The height of the coat rack can be chosen depending on the type of garment to be hung (for example, coats need a longer space below in order to hang freely compared to shorter jackets or towels), as well as ergonomics, mainly considering the height of the users. Coat racks can be hung at any height, for example between 100 cm and 180 cm above the floor. A single coat rack to be used by adults can, for example, be placed at a height between 150 cm and 180 cm. A double coat rack (for example at 90 cm and 180 cm in height) can provides better utilization of storage space, and the lower rack may be suitable for children. Several coat hooks can also be mounted at varying heights. Coat racks are often placed under a hat shelf, and one source recommends that hat racks should be mounted approximately 170 cm to 180 cm high.

It is recommended that any wall mounted rack is securely attached to the wall, for example via wall studs.

== Norms and standards ==
According to DIN 81407, a distinction is made between three forms:

- Form A, coat hook, two-armed (combined hat and coat hook)
- Form B, coat hook, one-armed, light
- Form C, coat hook, one-armed, heavy
- DIN 81407:2010-01 Clothes hooks, curtain hooks and towel hooks (replacement for DIN 81407:1978-08)

== Examples ==
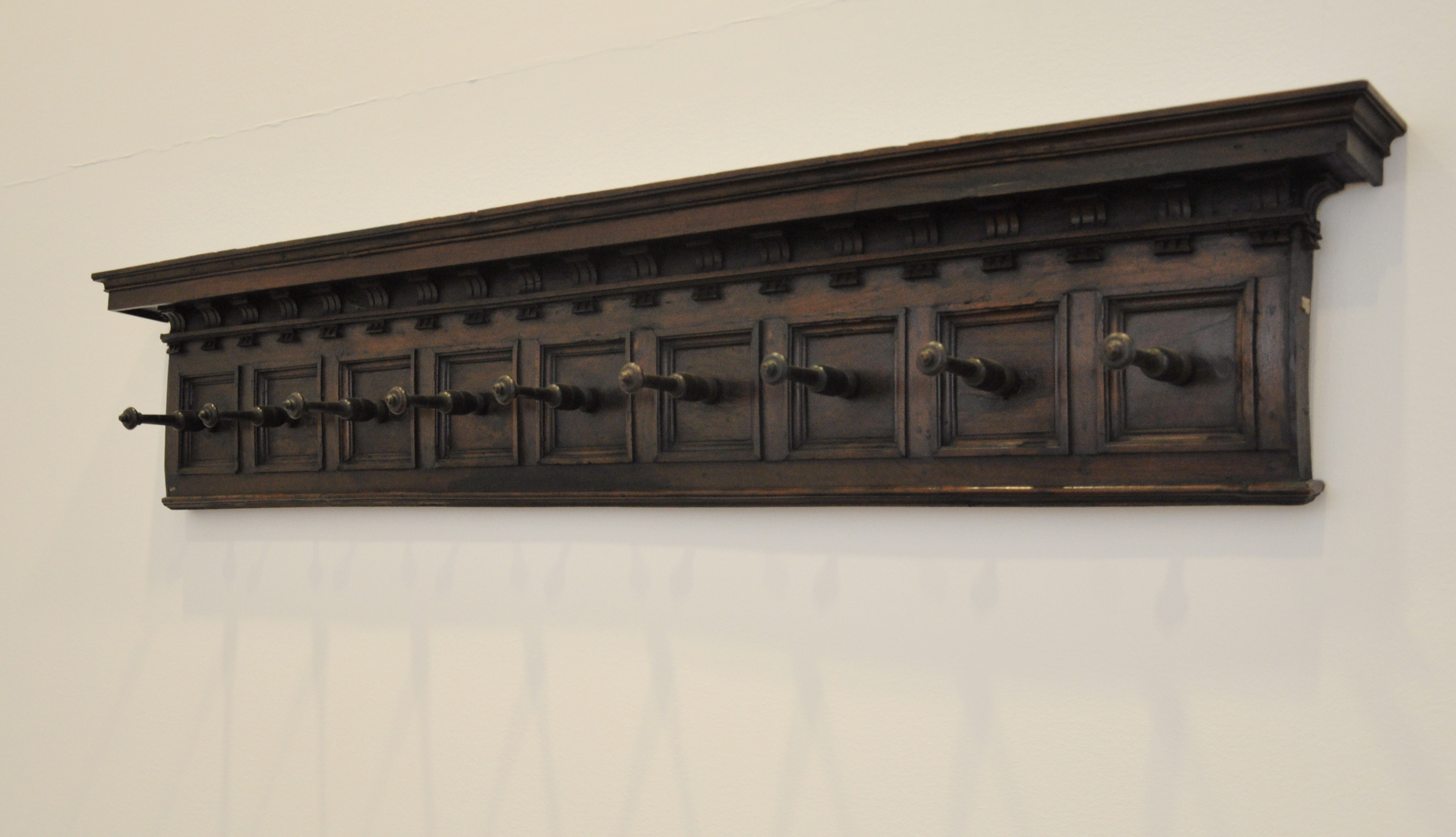
Antique coat rack from Tuscany (16th century)

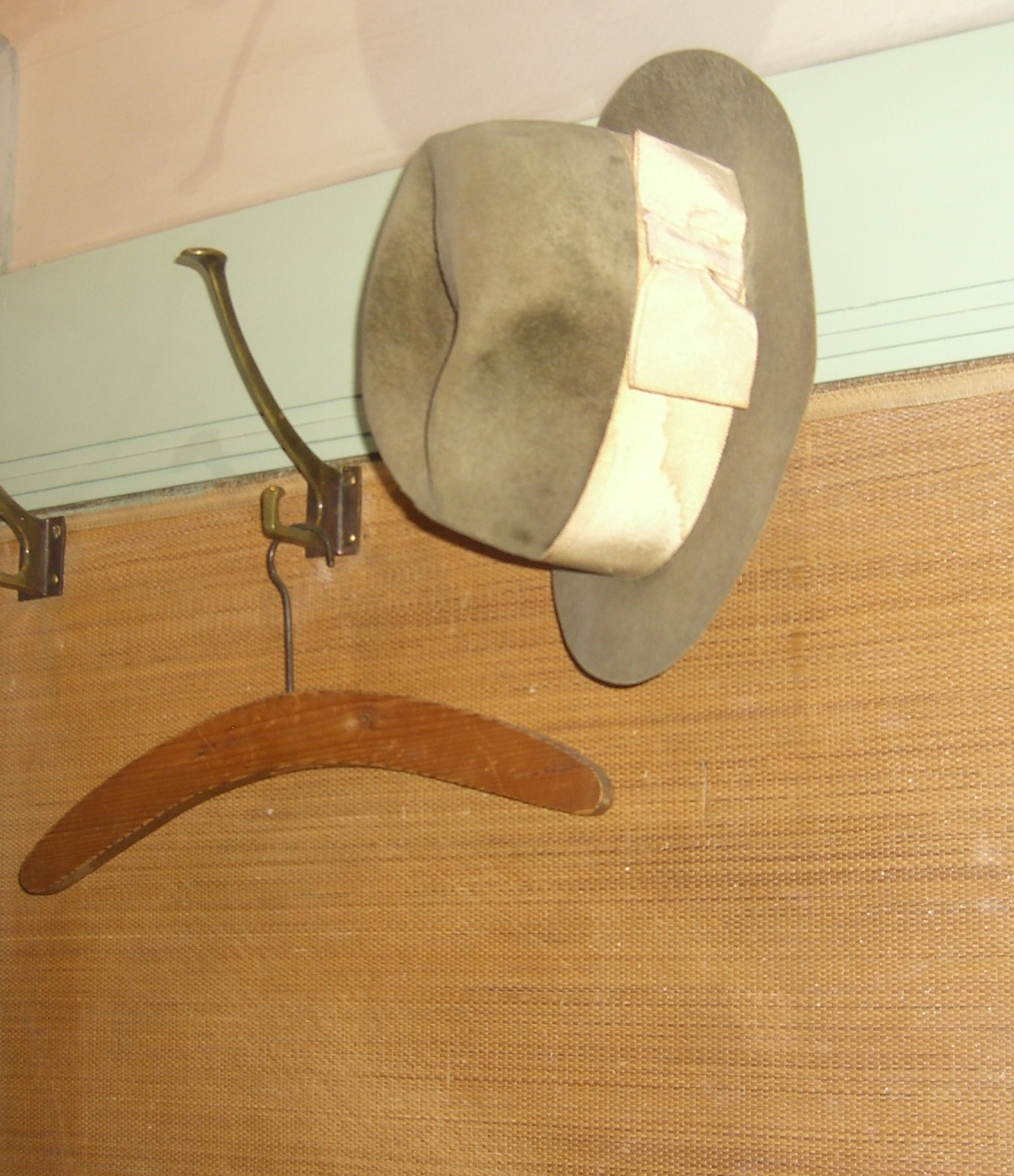
Art Nouveau metal hook

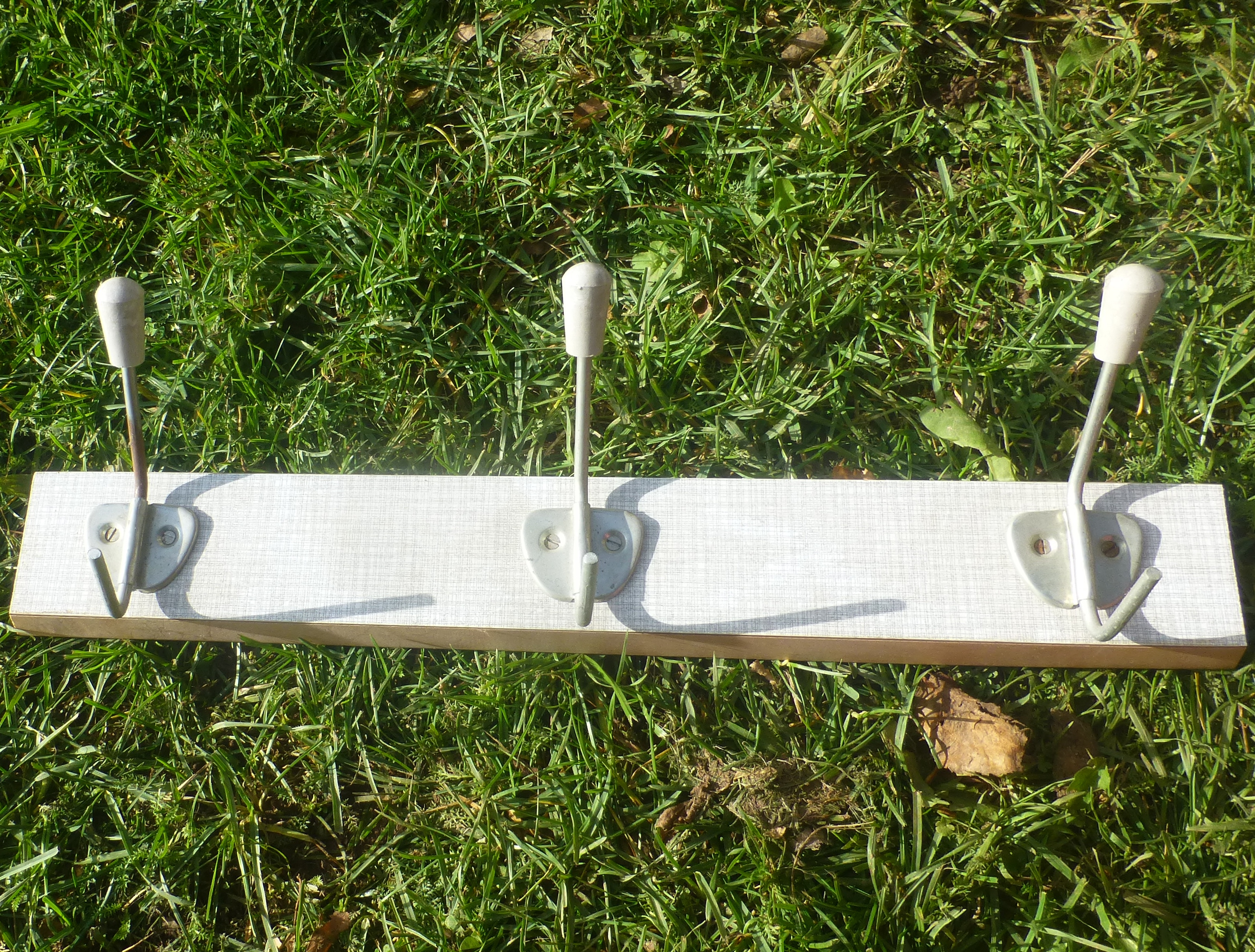
Coat rack made in the East Germany

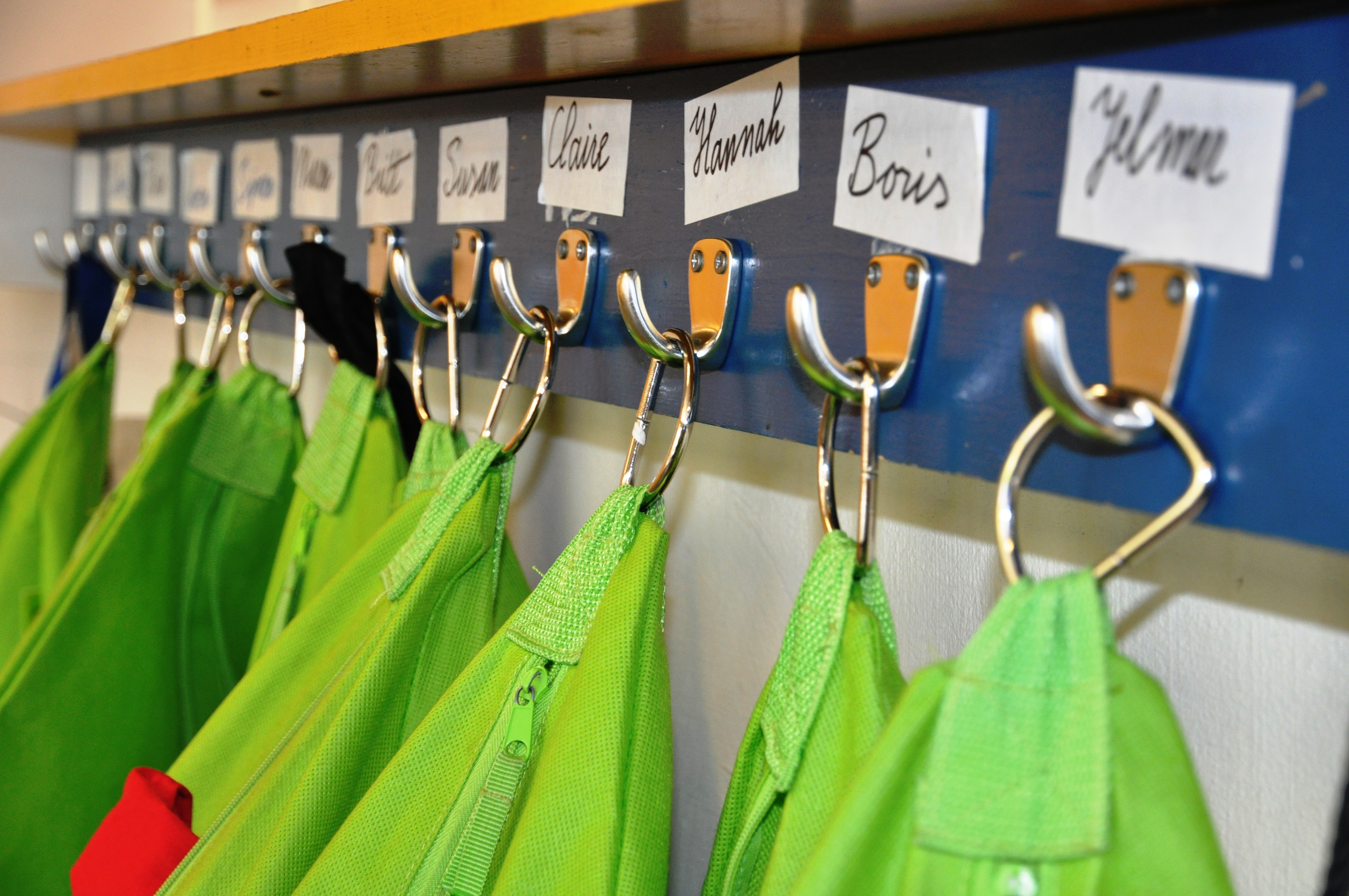
Rack of clothes hooks in a Dutch primary school

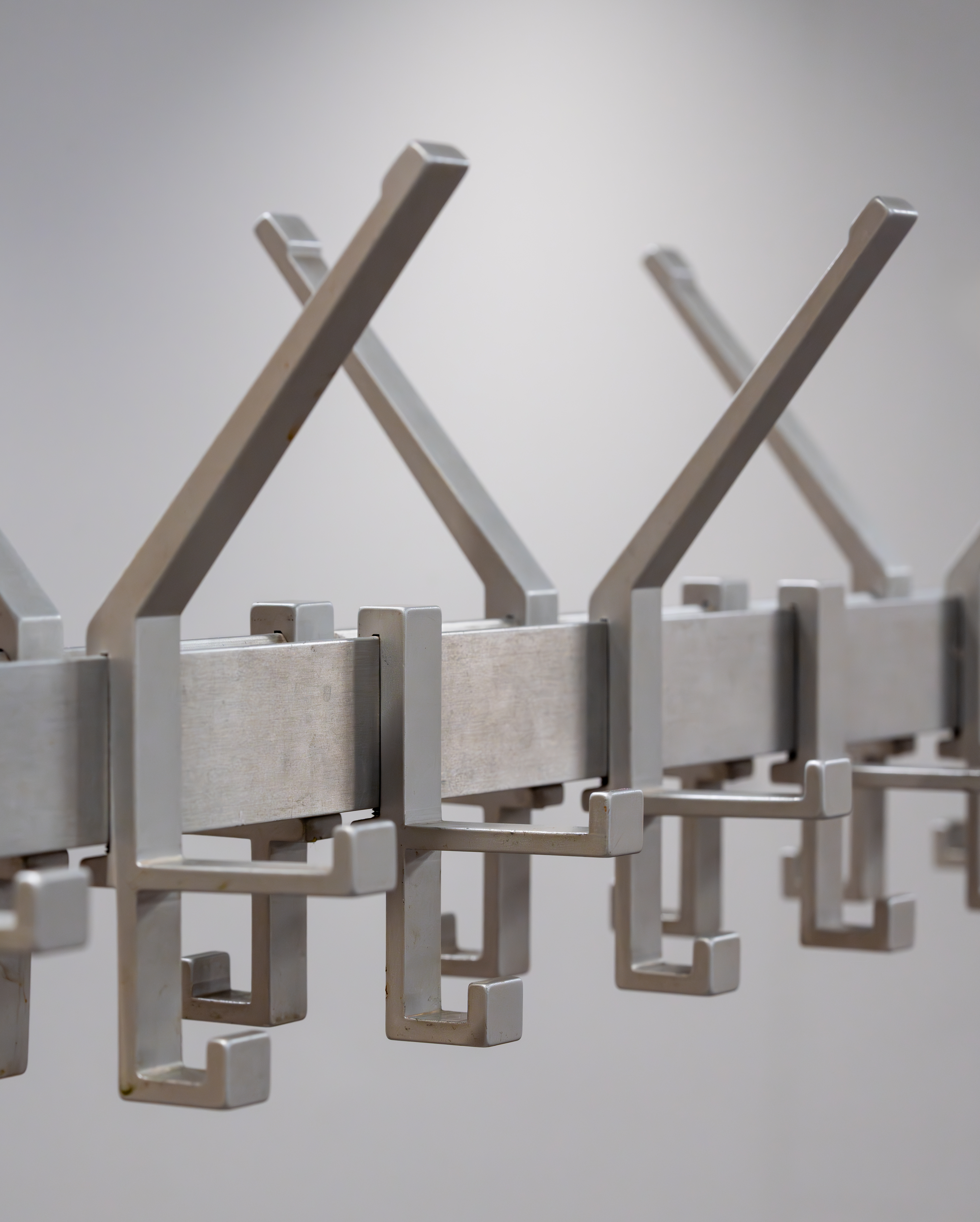
Clothes hooks on a movable clothes rack

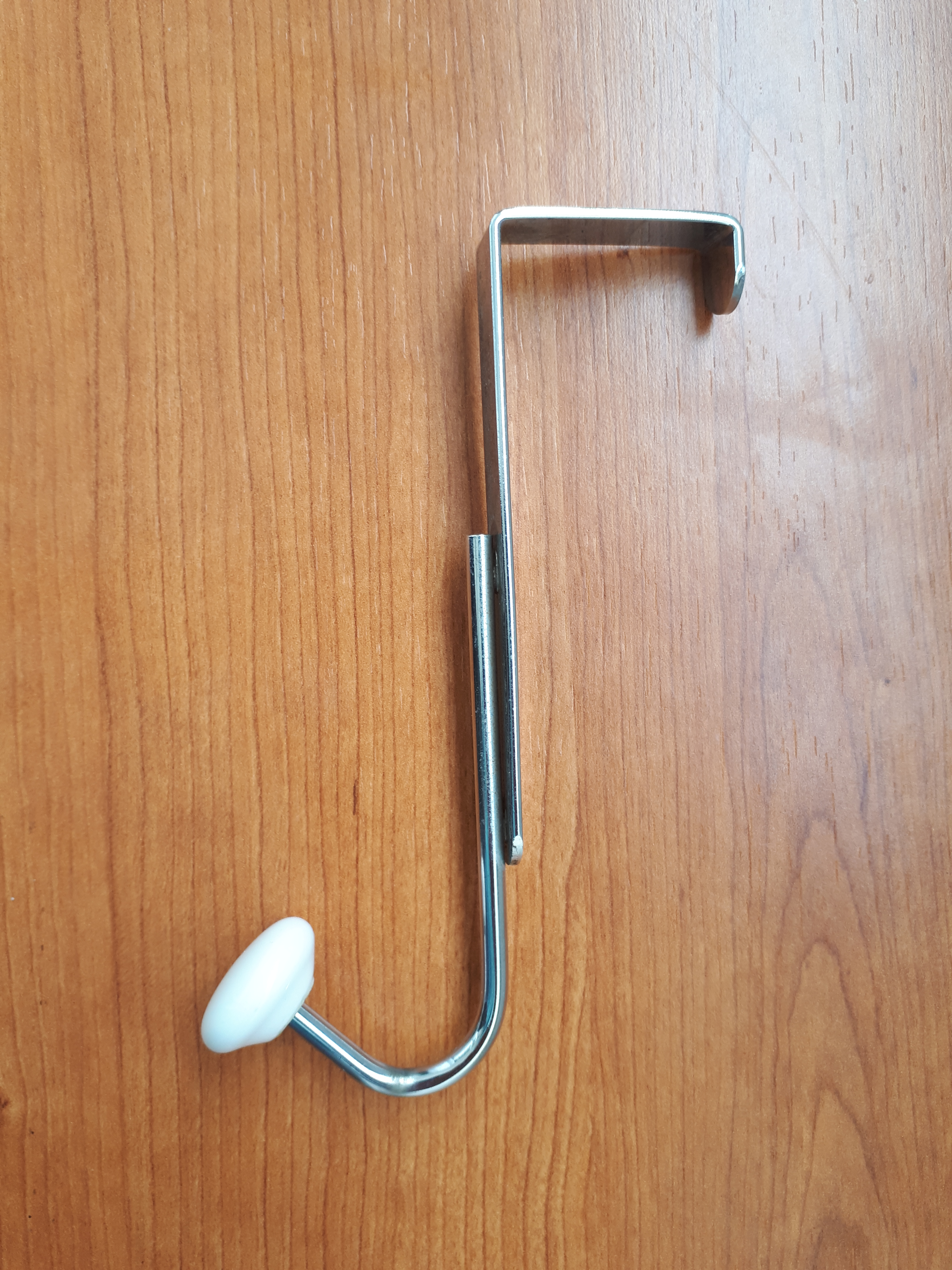
Simple hook for hanging on door leaf

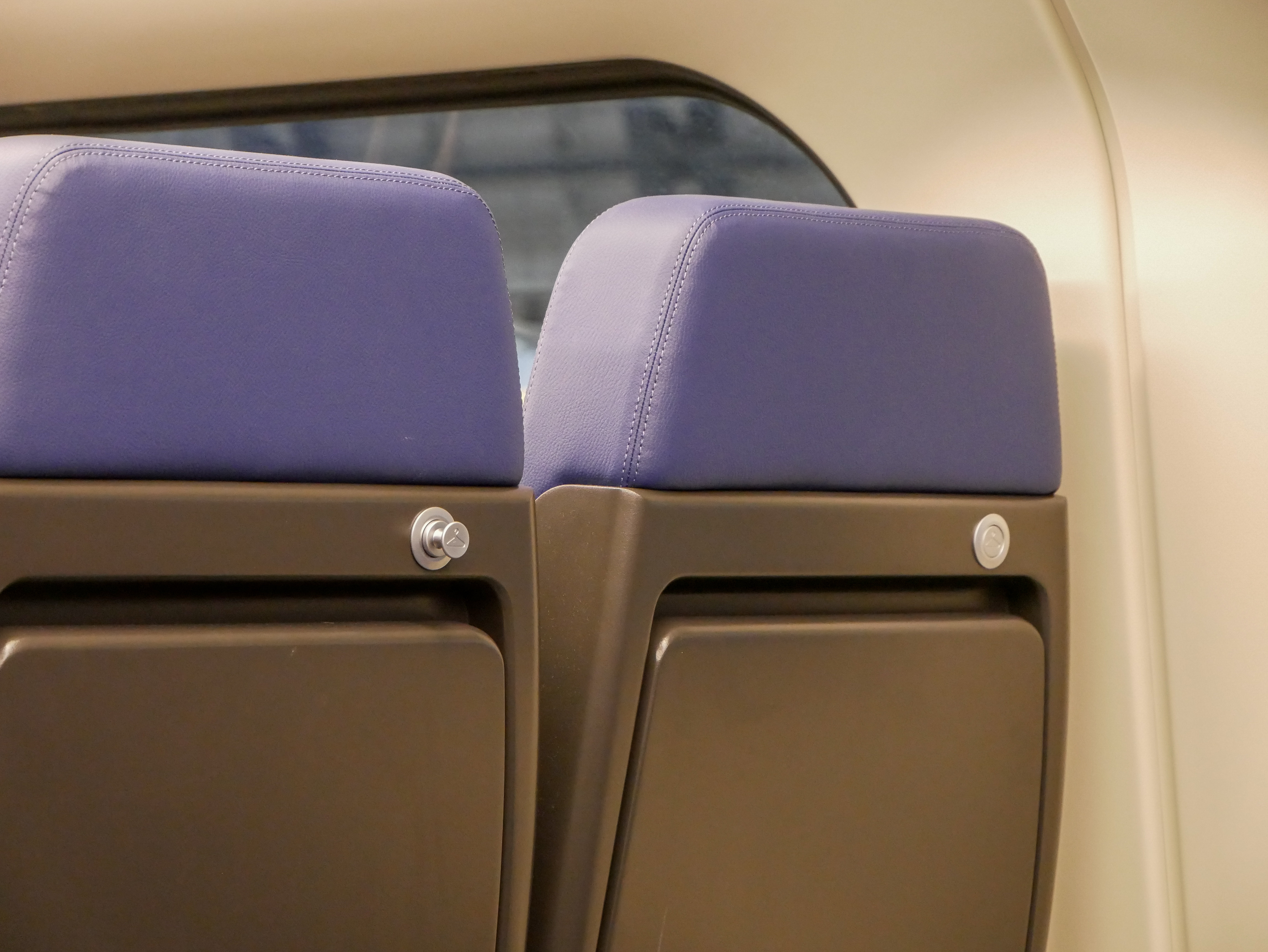
Retractable hooks on the seats of a railway train

== See also ==
- Cloth loop, loop attached to a garment so that it can be more easily hung up for storage
- Clothes hanger, device for hanging clothes, designed after human shoulders
- Clothes peg, fastener for hanging up clothes for drying, usually on a clothes line
- Clothes rail, a rod or piece of furniture used in wardrobes to hold clothes hangers
- Coat rack, fixed or freestanding clothes rack for storing jackets and hats
- Hatstand, shelf mounted high for storing smaller items
- Hook, tool used to grab onto, connect, or attach to something
- Webbing, strong woven fabric used instead of rope
