= Clothes rail =

Railing used for holding clothes hangers

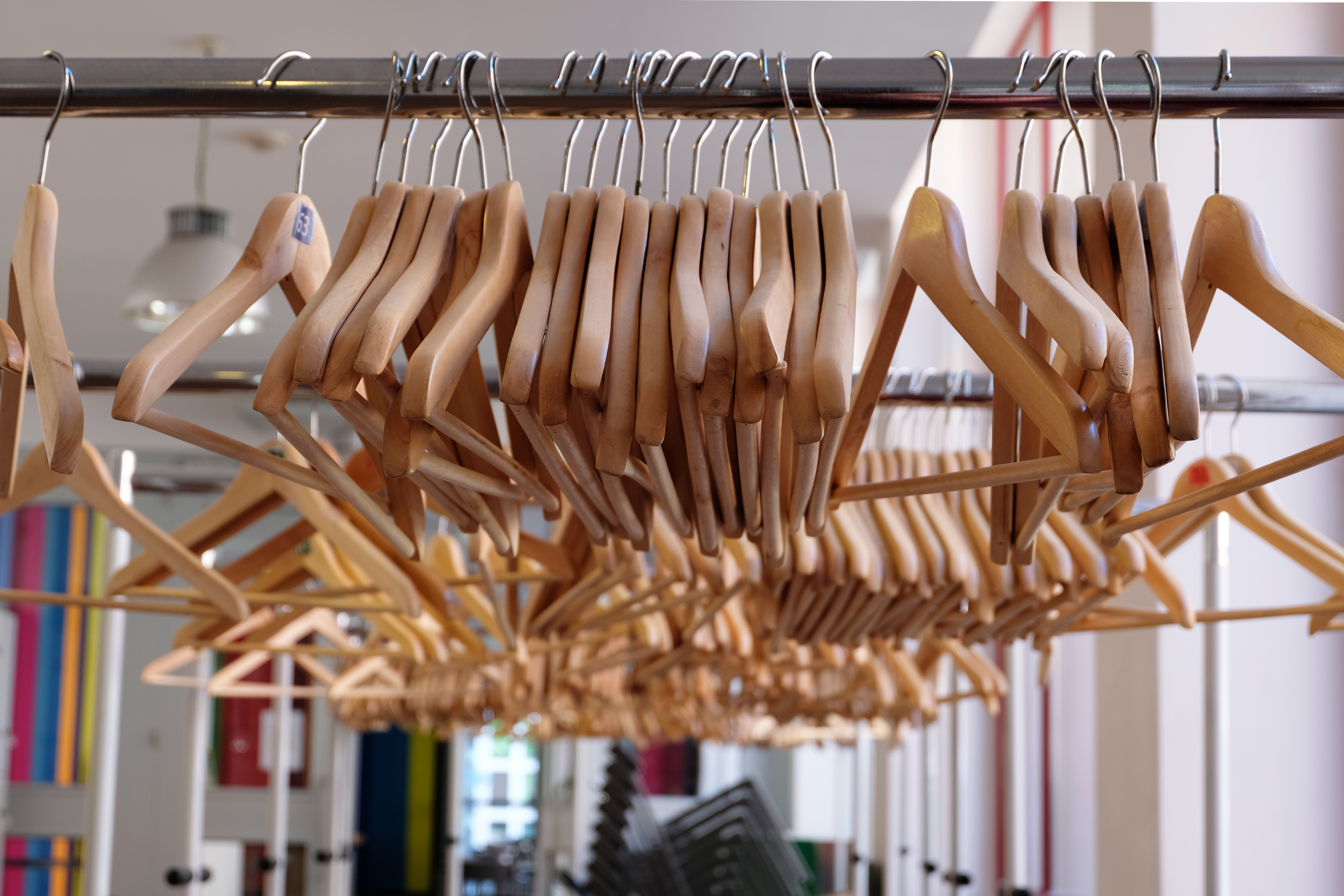
Clothes hangers hanging on a clothes rack

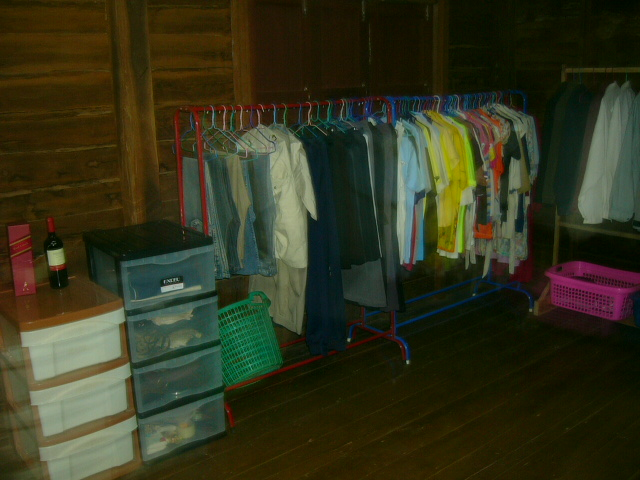
Two free-standing racks

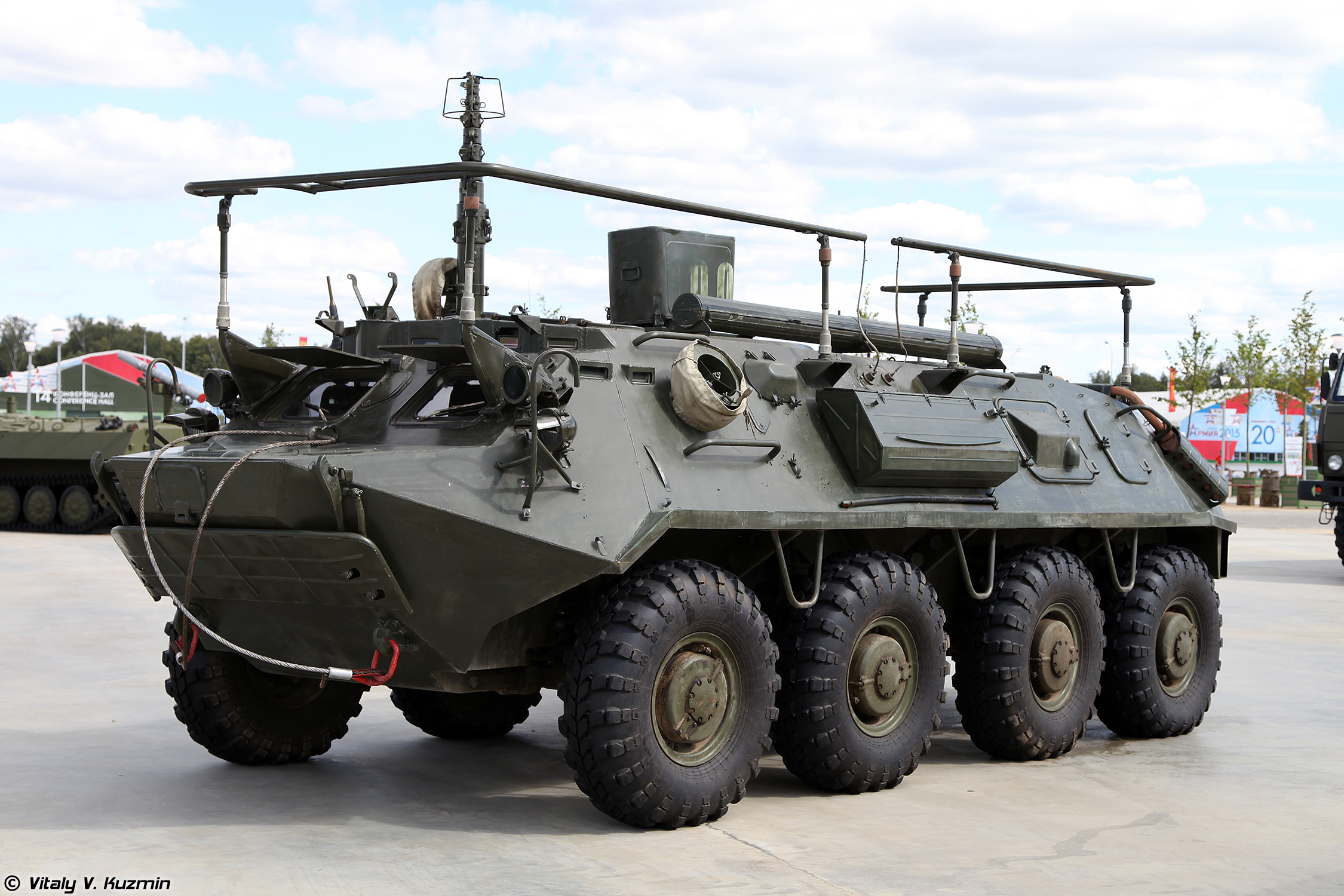
An NVIS antenna in a militart vehicle used in a "clothes rail" configuration around the top deck

A clothes rail, also known by various names such as garment rail, hanging rail, clothes rack or coat stand, is a railing used in wardrobes for holding clothes hangers. They can provide space-efficient storage and easy access to clothing.

Several types of clothes rails exist. In wardrobes, clothes rails are typically either wall mounted or secured inside the walls of cabinets. Freestanding racks may be suitable as a solution that does not require drilling in walls. There are also special variants such as telescopic rails or over-the-door storage. In retail stores, clothes racks are used for retail display, and often have wheels to make them portable so they can be more easily moved for storage outside shopping hours.

== Materials ==
The closet rod is often made of a metal pipe such as tubular steel (for example 25 mm or 30 mm), but can also be made of other materials such as wood (typically for aesthetic reasons) or plastic (typically for budgetary reasons). Metal rods have the advantage that they provide low friction against the metal hooks commonly used on clothes hangers, which can make it easier to sort through clothing. Solutions to further reduce the friction have also been patented.

== Load capacity ==
The rail should have a suitable load capacity to be able to carry the weight of any heavy garments that can be expected to be placed on it (such as coats; a winter coat can for example weigh up to 2 kg) with a factor of safety. For example, some consumer racks are rated at 15 kg or 30 kg, while some heavy-duty clothing rails are rated for up to 100 kg when the load is evenly spread across the rail. It is also beneficial that the rail does not bend from the weight. Some considerations are the distance between mounting points, weight of the clothes that may be used, and the length of the rail. The stability of the stand is also important to ensure that it does not tip over.

== Ergonomics ==
For clothes rails to be user-friendly, they need to account for different ergonomic considerations. The rail should be placed at a height that takes into account:

- Clothing types and styles: Types of garments, as well as style and fashion trends, dictate how much free vertical space a rail section requires.
- Comfortable reach: The user's height should be taken into consideration (see manual handling of loads). For example, the most ergonomic height lifting-wise is between shoulder or elbow and hip height, but clothes racks are often hung a little higher for visibility and storage considerations.
- Storage: Whether it is desirable to hang only one clothes rail, or if two clothes rails above each is desirable to maximize storage ("double hanging" or "double pole").
- Visibility: For observability, the clothing should hang around eye level, and with sufficient vertical spacing to hang freely and not clutter surrounding clothing at the next level(s).

=== Garment lengths ===
Garments can be grouped into length-wise categories to make storage more efficient. Optimal lengths will differ with a persons height, as well as current style and fashion trends. For example, tailors from different regions could lean towards sewing longer or shorter jackets for the same customer. Below are some rules of thumb that can be helpful during planning to ensure the longest items are hanging freely without touching the bottom of the wardrobe, the rail below or the shelf above:.

- Double hanging: When hanging two rails above each other, a top rail height of around 190 cm or 200 cm or 210 cm or 215 cm may be recommended. A lower or higher height may be useful depending on the user. The second rail may be placed at half of the overall height, or perhaps slightly lower or slightly higher. One source recommends minimum of about 100–110 cm per section to avoid overlapping which can create a crammed appearance.
- Shirts and suits: ~95–105 cm is sometimes recommended for shirts and suit jackets, but up to ~130–140 cm may be required for long blazers or more formal suits like black tie.
- Short clothes: ~80–90 cm may be recommended for short items such as shorts, skirts and folded trousers hanged from clothes hangers.
- Short dresses and waist pants: ~140–180 cm may be suitable for short dresses or non-folded wait pants. Such storage may also be suited for longer suit jackets for men.
- Long dresses and coats: ~180–190 cm. Some recommend that at least a quarter of the wardrobe should be able to facilitate longer garments such as long dresses and coats.

Wardrobes for children should be at a lower height, typically the clothes are shorter so that about 70 cm per level is sufficient.

=== Access ===
According to Human Dimension and Interior Space (1979), hanging rails should be placed just above eye level for the shortest user. The figure Closet and storage facilities (p. 310 of 689) and its accompanying table suggests a rail height of about 163–173 cm for men, and 152–178 cm for women, representing 5th and 95th percentiles, respectively. Those recommendations are likely based on average heights in United States in the late 1970s and subjective judgements by the authors, and updated figures could vary by average human height by country. This way, recommendations can be formed that are suitable for 95% of the population.

=== Adjustability ===
Some adjustable wardrobes make it possible to adjust the height as children grow or when the home changes owners. They also make it possible to reconfigure the wardrobe to different types of clothes.

== See also ==
- Closet, an enclosed space with a door
- Clothes hanger, a hanging device in the shape/contour of human shoulders
- Clothes horse, rack used for drying clothes
- Hatstand, used to hang and store clothing items
- Wardrobe, a standing closet used for storing clothes
