= Hatstand =

Device used to store hats and coats

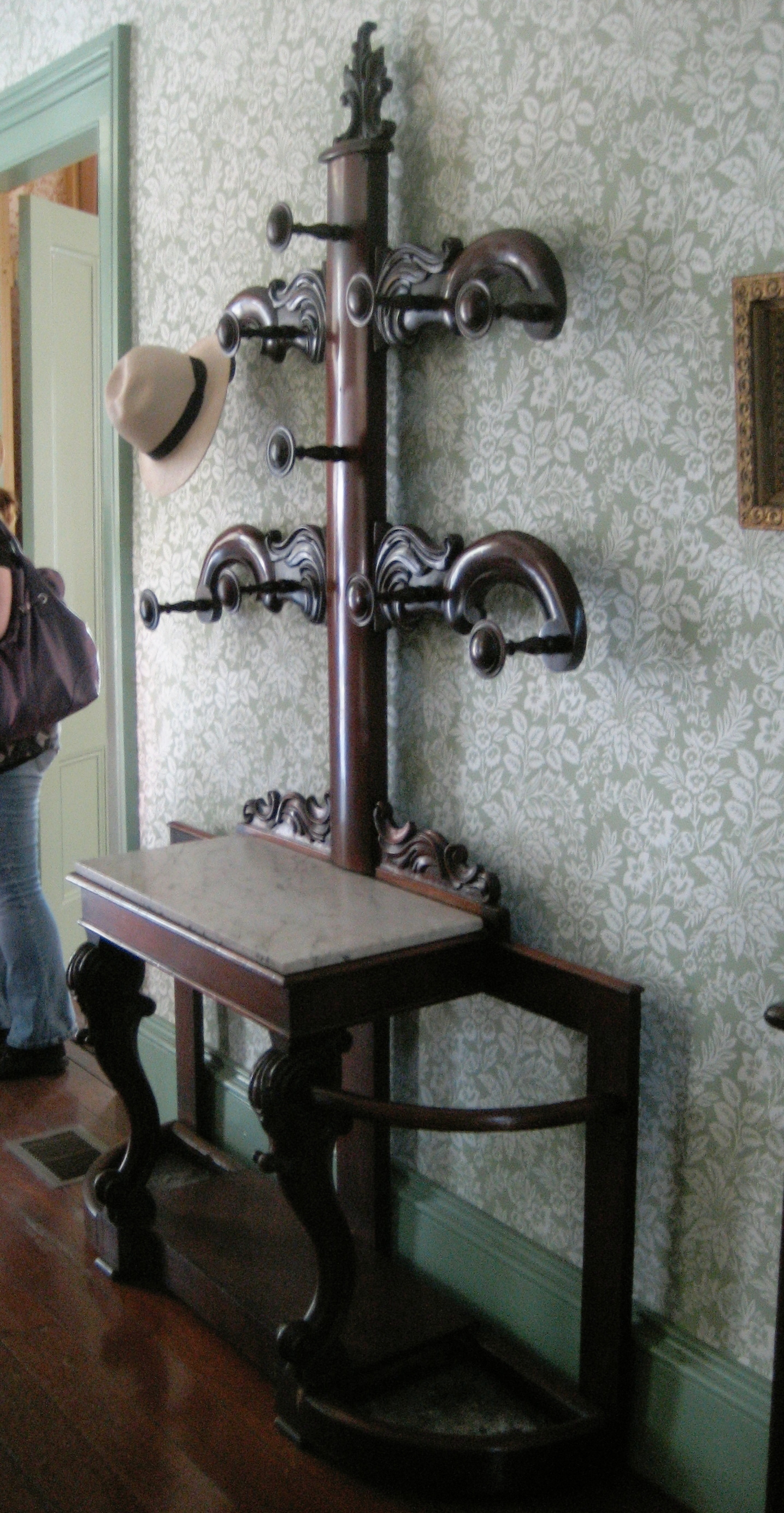
Hall tree at the Clara Barkley Dorr House, in Pensacola, Florida, with a marble top shelf and umbrella stands at the sides

A hatstand (UK), hatrack (US), coat rack, coat stand, hat tree, hall tree, or portmanteau is a device used to store hats and often coats on, and umbrellas within. A coat rack often refers to a set of hooks that are attached to a wall. Usually made of wood or metal and standing at least 150 cm (5 ft) tall, the self-standing variant is more often referred to as a hatstand and has a single pole, a sturdy base to prevent toppling, and an array of lengthy pegs at the top for placement of hats. A hatrack was used to decorate Victorian front halls while providing storage.

== Description ==
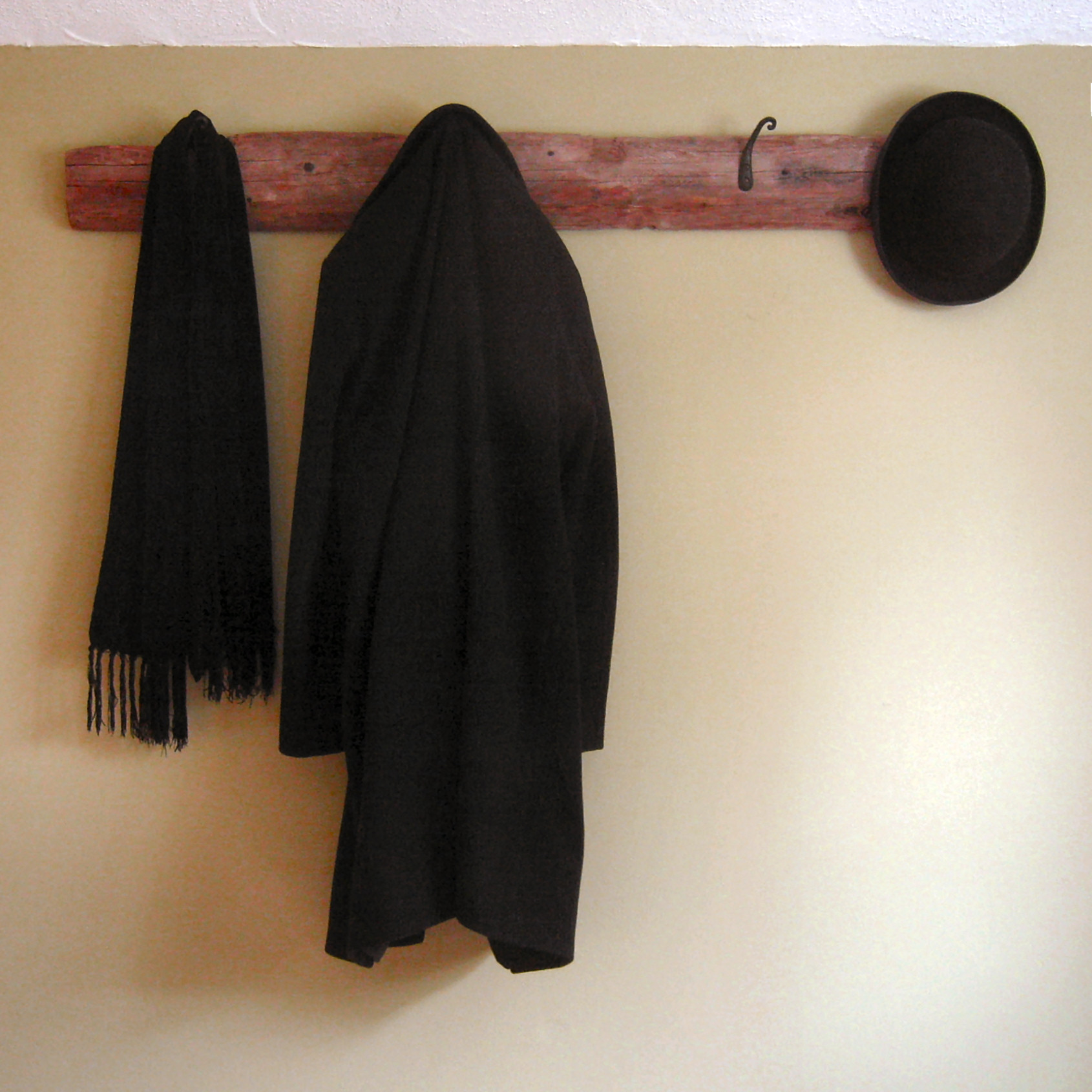
A coat rack made from clothes hooks and a mounting plate

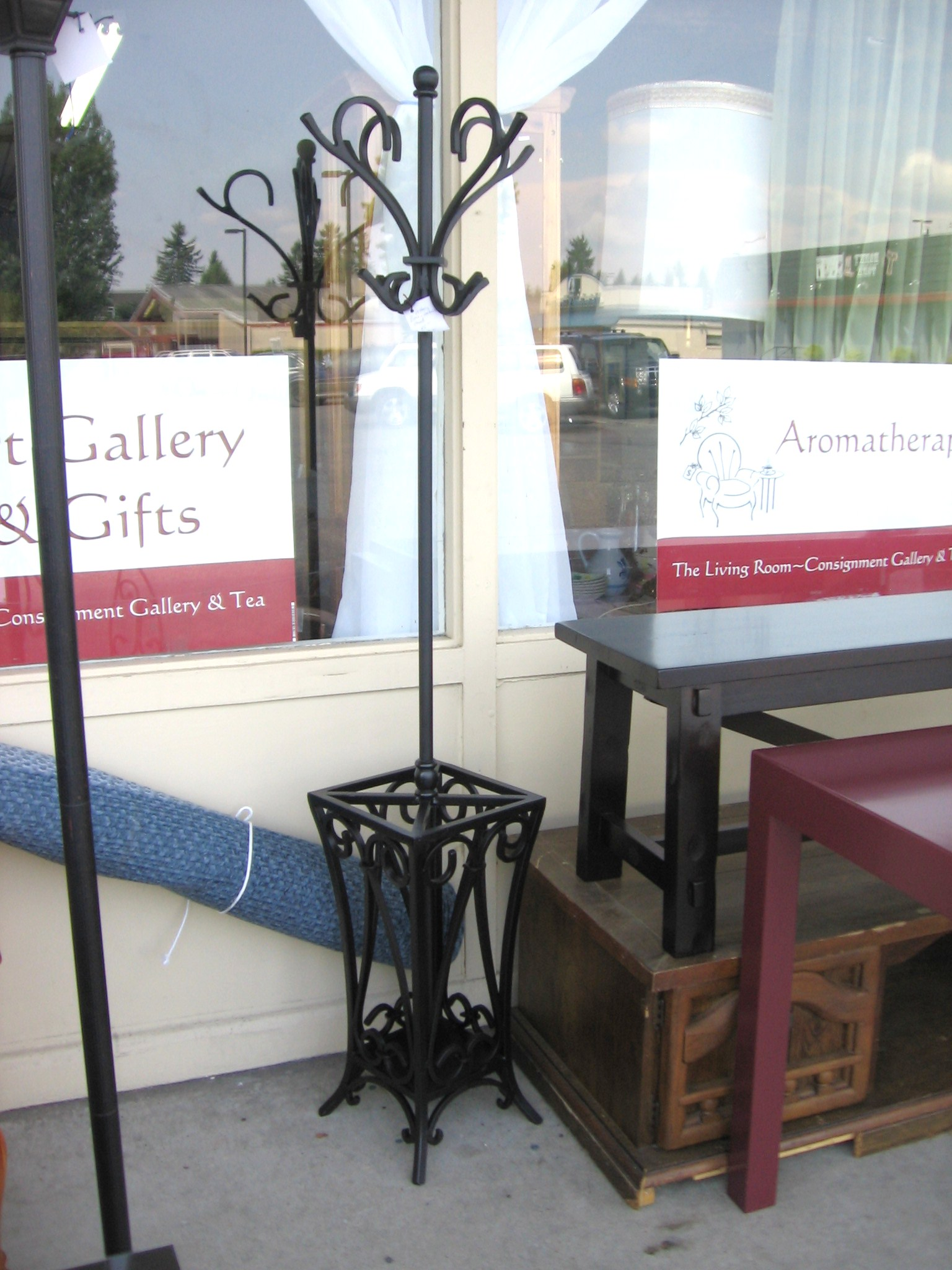
A free-standing hatstand and umbrella stand

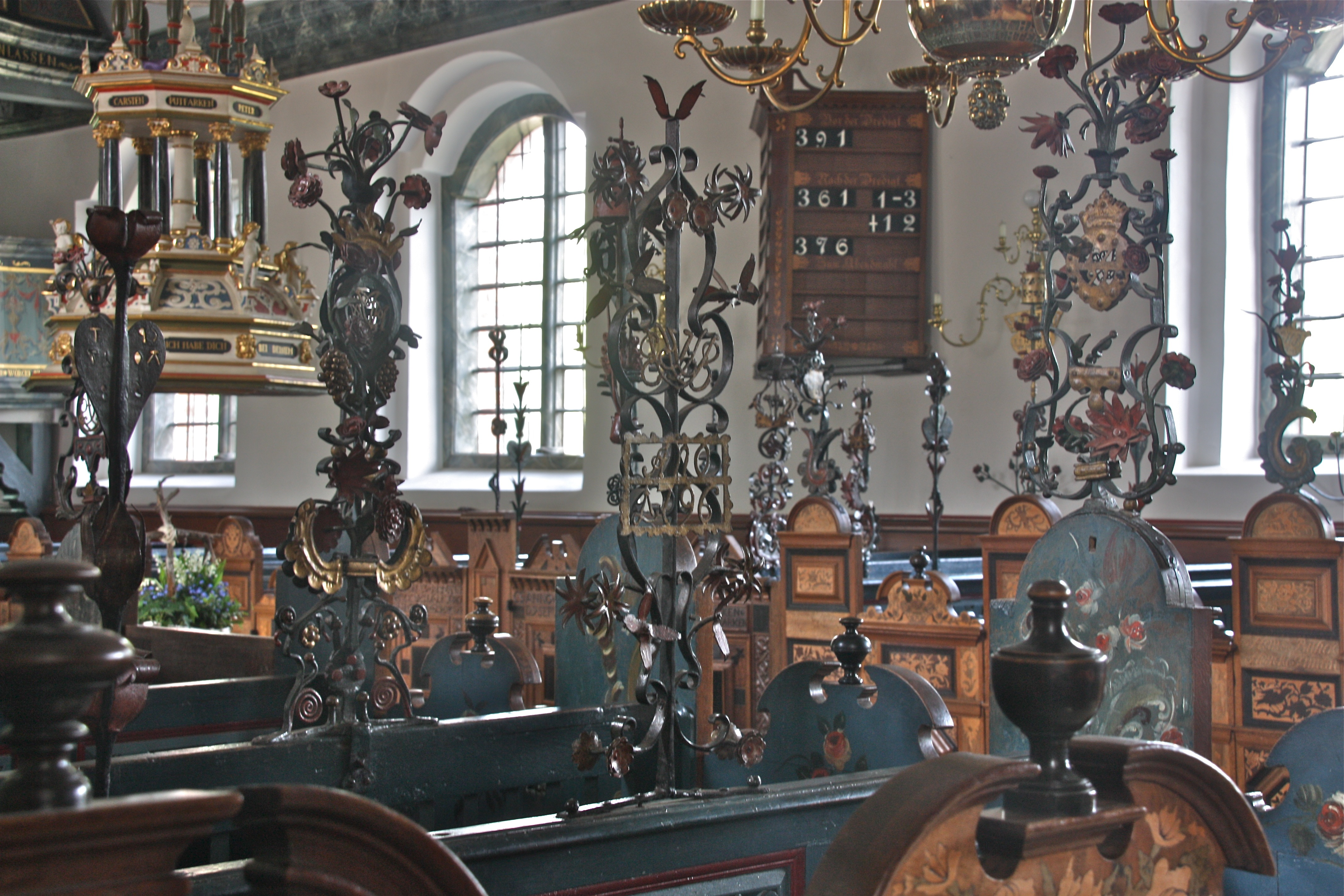
Hatracks, 18th century, in St. Nicholas Church, Altengamme, Hamburg, Germany

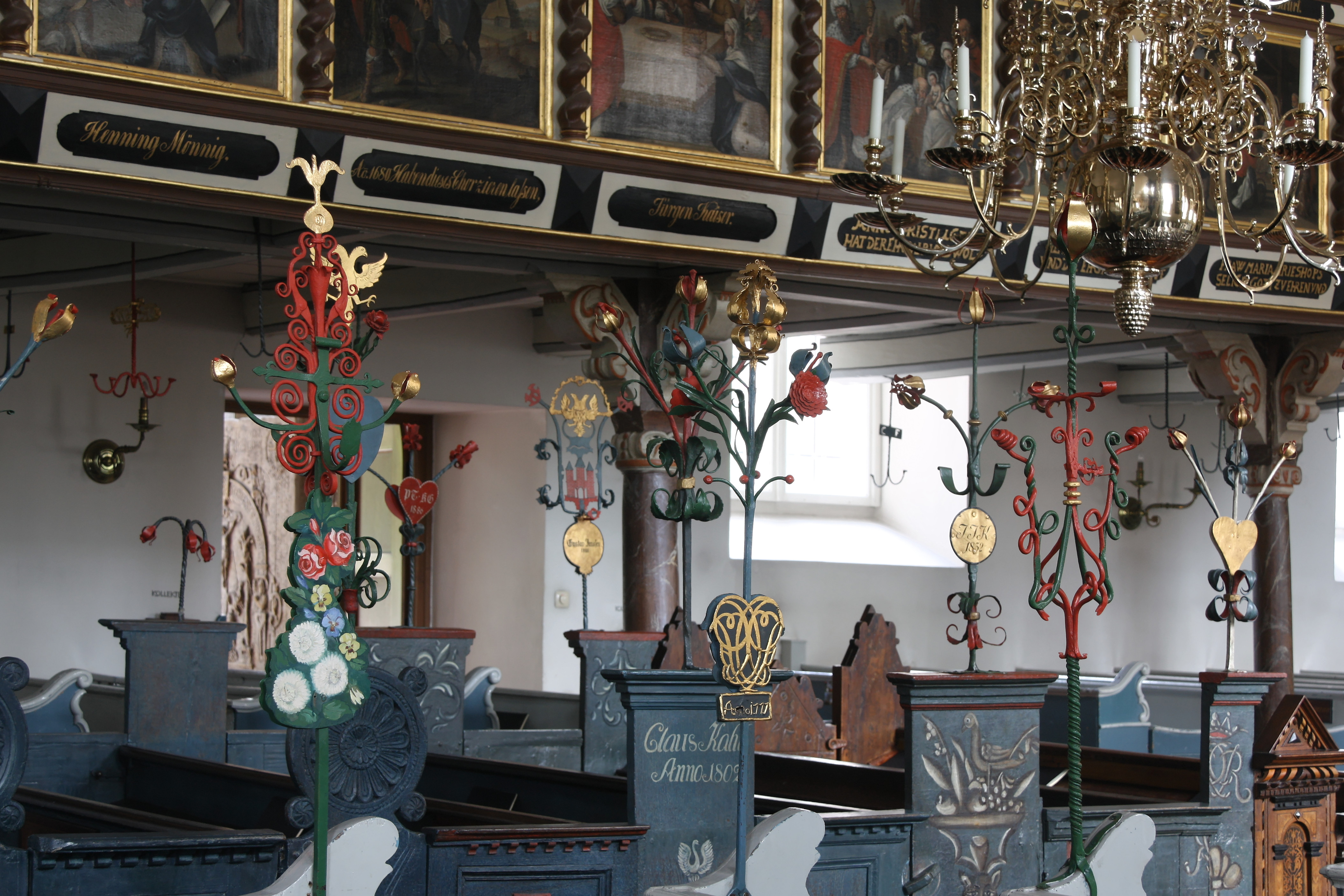
Hatracks, Sankt-Severini Church, Kirchwerder near Hamburg

A hatstand is a device used to store hats and often coats on, and umbrellas within. Usually made of wood and standing at least 150 cm (5 ft) tall, they have a single pole making up most of the height, with a sturdy base to prevent toppling, and an array of lengthy pegs at the top for placement of hats. The complicated shapes of the spindles and hooks of both varieties create an interesting pattern on the wall.

=== Name ===
The device is known by various names including hatstand (UK), hatrack (US), coat rack, coat stand, and hall tree. Some upscale European catalogues market it as a portmanteau from the French porter ('carry') and manteau ('cloak'). A coat rack often refers to a set of hooks that are attached to a wall and is mainly used to hang coats and jackets; the self-standing variant is more often referred to as a hatstand, and is mostly used to hang coats, jackets, umbrellas and hats.

== History ==
The front hall was the introduction to the house, and as such was an important part of the Victorian home. Furnishings were selected not only to make it a useful place to hang a hat and coat, store an umbrella and leave a calling card, but also to show family wealth, social position and knowledge of current styles. A hall stand or a hatrack was the most important piece of furniture. These were new forms that appeared about 1840, such as the hall tree, as homes became larger and social visits became more structured. Smaller houses had smaller front halls, so a hanging hatrack was the answer to the problem of storing visitors' coats and hats. As well as holding hats and coats, a hall tree could be used to store bags, umbrellas, walking sticks, boots and other items.

In the 18th century, specially crafted hatracks were part of the furniture in Lutheran churches in a region east of Hamburg, Germany.

By the 1920s, houses had become smaller, and hall furnishings were usually just a chair, a table and perhaps a mirror; a closet or cupboard held hats and coats.

== See also ==
- Clothes valet
- Lobby (room)
