= Minky =

British cleaning supplies company

Vale Mill (Rochdale) Limited
- Trade name: Minky
- Company type: Private company
- Industry: Cleaning material and equipment manufacture
- Headquarters: Rochdale, England
- Number of employees: 359
- Website: Minky.com/uk/

Minky is the trading name of Vale Mill (Rochdale) Limited, a company based in Rochdale, Greater Manchester, United Kingdom that produces cleaning material and equipment.

== History ==
Minky is a family owned and run business that was founded in 1941. In 1987, the company acquired the Relax Ironing Board Company and expanded its product range to include ironing boards and was re-branded as Minky. In 1993, it acquired Besco Baron for its cleaning cloth range.

The company has manufacturing units in Crumpsall, Manchester, one in Shawclough, Rochdale, (ironing boards) and one in Bad Honnef, Germany producing cleaning cloths. The annual turnover of the company in 2012 was £33,771,000.00 and it employed 359 staff.

== Products ==
- Carpet sweepers
- Cleaning cloths
- Cleaning products
- Clothes horses
- Clothes lines
- Dusters
- Ironing boards
  - Ironing board accessories
- Mops
- Scouring pads

== Royal Warrants ==
In 1994, the company was granted a Royal Warrant to manufacture and supply laundry and cleaning products to the Queen. A second warrant was granted in 2013 to supply products to the Prince of Wales. A wide range of products is supplied to the Royal Households, including hand made conservation dusting brushes for art and antiques.
