= Toyne =

Toyne is an English surname. Notable people with this surname include:

- Fay Toyne, Australian tennis player
- Gilbert Toyne (1888–1983), Australian inventor
- Ian Toyne (1930–1999), Australian Australian rules football player
- Jeff Toyne (born 1975), Canadian film composer
- Len Toyne (1922–1998), Australian Australian rules football player
- Peter Toyne (born 1946), Australian politician
- Peter Toyne (academic)
- Phillip Toyne (1947–2015), Australian activist
- Simon Toyne (born 1968), British writer
- Stanley Toyne (1881–1962), English cricket player
- Timothy Toyne Sewell (born 1941), British army officer
