= Box wine =

Wine packaged in a bag-in-box arrangement

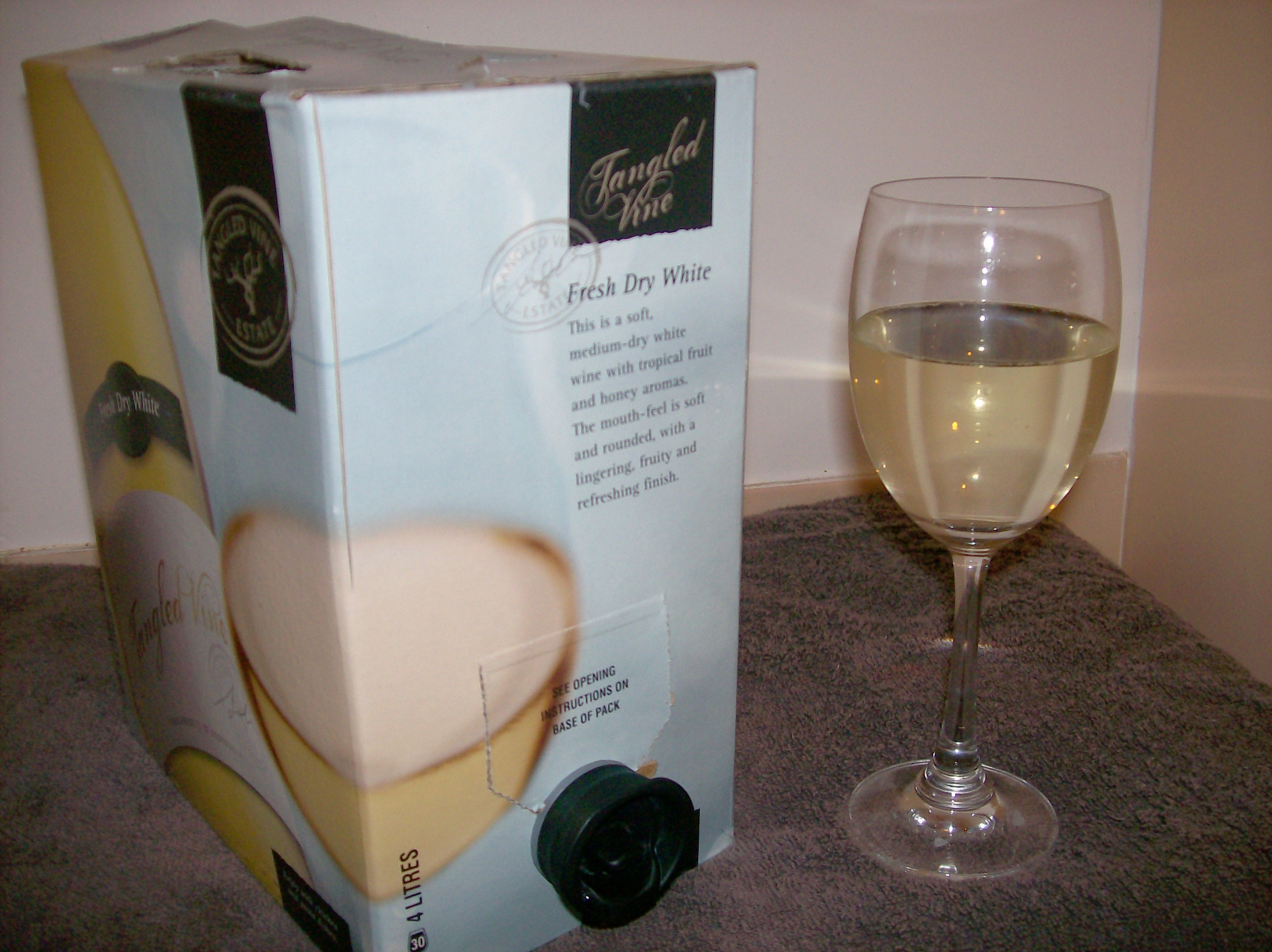
A 4-litre cask of Australian white wine

Boxed wine, also known as cask wine, bag-in-box wine, or goon, is any wine that is sold in bag-in-box packaging. The wine is stored in a strong, flexible bag made of synthetic plastic films which is held in a corrugated cardboard box, with a one-way plastic valve for dispensing the wine.

Boxed wine is generally quite affordable. In Australia, boxed wine is often the cheapest type of alcohol available at liquor stores.

However, there are some negative perceptions associated with boxed wine. Some consider boxed wine to be lower quality compared to bottled wine, and that its bag-in-box packaging is unsuitable for wine. It has also been suggested that there is a socially determined bias against boxed wine.

== History ==
The process for packaging "cask wine" (boxed wine) was invented by Thomas Angove, a winemaker from Renmark, South Australia, and patented by his company on 20 April 1964. Polyethylene bladders of one gallon (4.5 litres) were placed in corrugated boxes for retail sale. The original design required that the consumer cut the corner off the bladder, pour out the serving of wine, and then reseal it with a special peg. This design was based on a product already on the market, a bag in a box used by mechanics to hold and transport battery acid.

In 1967, Australian inventor Charles Malpas and Penfolds Wines patented a plastic, air-tight tap welded to a metallised bladder, making storage more convenient. Modern wine casks use plastic taps which can be exposed by tearing away a perforated panel on the box. For the following decades, bag-in-box packaging was primarily preferred by producers of less expensive wines, as they were cheaper to produce and distribute than glass flagons, which served a similar market.

In Australia, due to the difference in how wine is taxed compared to other alcoholic beverages, boxed wine is often the least expensive form of drinkable alcohol. A 4-litre cask of at least 9.5% alcohol can often be found for around A$10. These attributes have led to boxed wine being widely available throughout Australia and holding a prominent place in Australian pop culture.

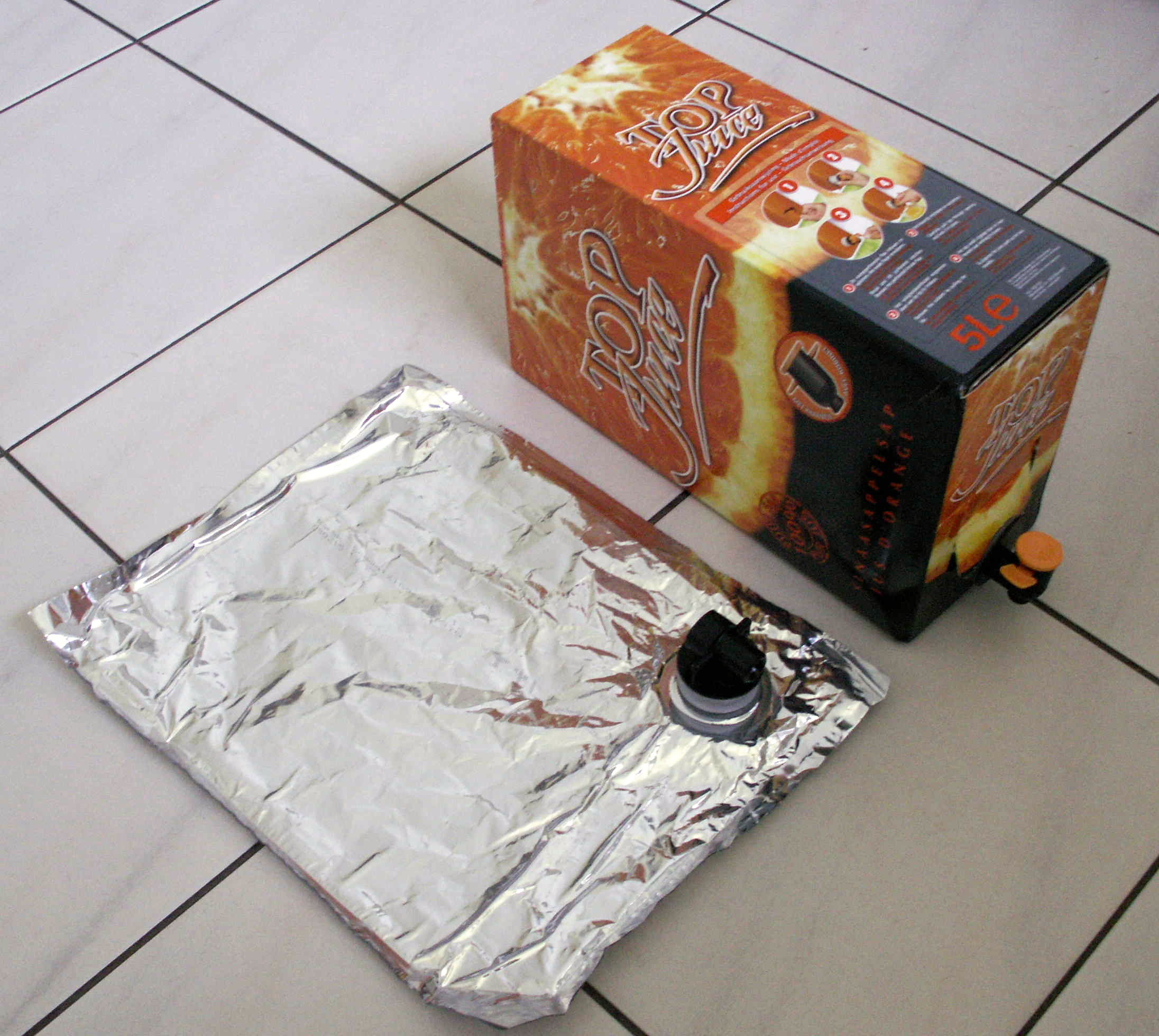
"Bag-in-box" packaging is used for boxed wine as well as other drinks

During the mid-1970s, the bag-in-box packaging concept expanded to other beverages, including spring waters, orange juices, and wine coolers.

In 2003, California Central Coast AVA-based Black Box Wines introduced mass premium wines in a box. Within the decade, premium wineries and bottlers began packaging their own high-quality boxed wine. This, coupled with an increased cultural interest in environmentally sustainable packaging has cultivated growing popularity with affluent wine consumers.

== Attributes ==
Boxed wines utilize plastic bags instead of traditional glass bottles, which significantly reduces production and shipping costs and subsequently makes boxed a more affordable option for consumers.

Typical bag-in-box containers hold one and a half to four 750 mL bottles of wine per box, though they come in a wide variety of volumes. Bag-in-box packaging is cheaper and lighter than glass-bottled wine.

The removal of wine from the flexible bag without adding air to fill the vacated space greatly reduces the oxidation of the wine during dispensing. Compared to bottled wine, which should be consumed within hours or days of opening, bag-in-box wine will not spoil for approximately 3–4 weeks after breaking the seal, or even longer if the wine is kept refrigerated after opening. In addition, it is not subject to cork taint. Wine contained in plastic bladders is not intended for cellaring and should be consumed within the manufacturer's printed shelf life. Deterioration may be noticeable 12 months after filling.

=== Environmentally friendly ===
The Scandinavian state institutions Systembolaget and Vinmonopolet analyzed the environmental impact of various wine packaging in 2010. Bag-in-box packaging was found to have 12% to 29% of the carbon footprint of bottled wine and to be superior to bottled wine in every other ecological criterion.

Tyler Colman from The New York Times stated that bag-in-box is more environmentally friendly than bottled wine, as well as easier to transport and store.

=== Health concerns ===
The introduction of cask wine in the late 1960s has had significant negative consequences. The Australian wine industry has benefited from favorable tax policies, which have led to a substantial increase in both domestic consumption and international exports. These developments have accompanied disadvantages with respect to public health and social issues related to increased alcohol accessibility and consumption.

Some manufacturers are now exploring alternative materials like stainless steel for aesthetic and durability reasons, particularly in premium boxed wine markets.

== Colloquialisms ==
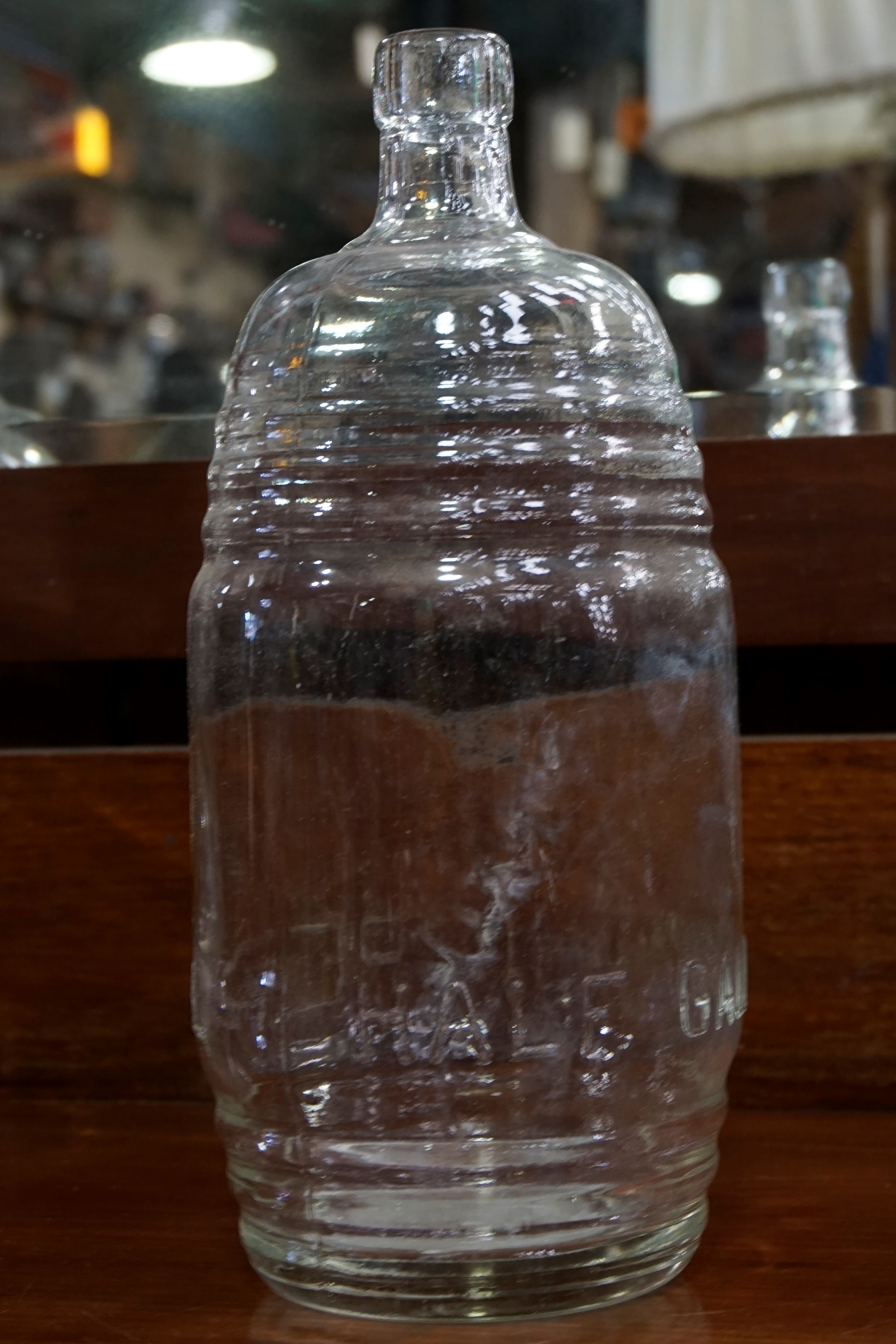
Australian flagon

In Australia, boxed wine is known colloquially as "goon". The cardboard box is referred to as a "goon box" and the bag within is referred to as a "goon bag". A common Australian drinking game is Goon of Fortune, in which a goon bag is suspended from a Hills Hoist and spun, and whoever it stops on must drink a selected amount of the goon.

The word goon is derived from the word flagon, which is a traditional container for retailing inexpensive wine or vinegar. An occasional Australian pronunciation of the word flagon, perhaps with humorous intent, placed emphasis on the second syllable such that flagon came to be pronounced as "fla-goon", which was then shortened to simply "goon".

Additionally, in Australia the term "silverpillow" is used to refer to the habit of inflating the empty bag and using it as a headrest. It is also known as a cask in some outback areas.

In New Zealand, the term "Château Cardboard", originally a joking reference to the wine's container, has entered the vernacular to refer to box wine.

In Finland, the terms are käsilaukku ("handbag"), humppakuutio ("Humppa Cube") and noppa (dice).

== See also ==
- Flavored fortified wine
- Goon of Fortune
- Jug wine, inexpensive table wine
- Wine cask
