= Goon of Fortune =

Australian drinking game

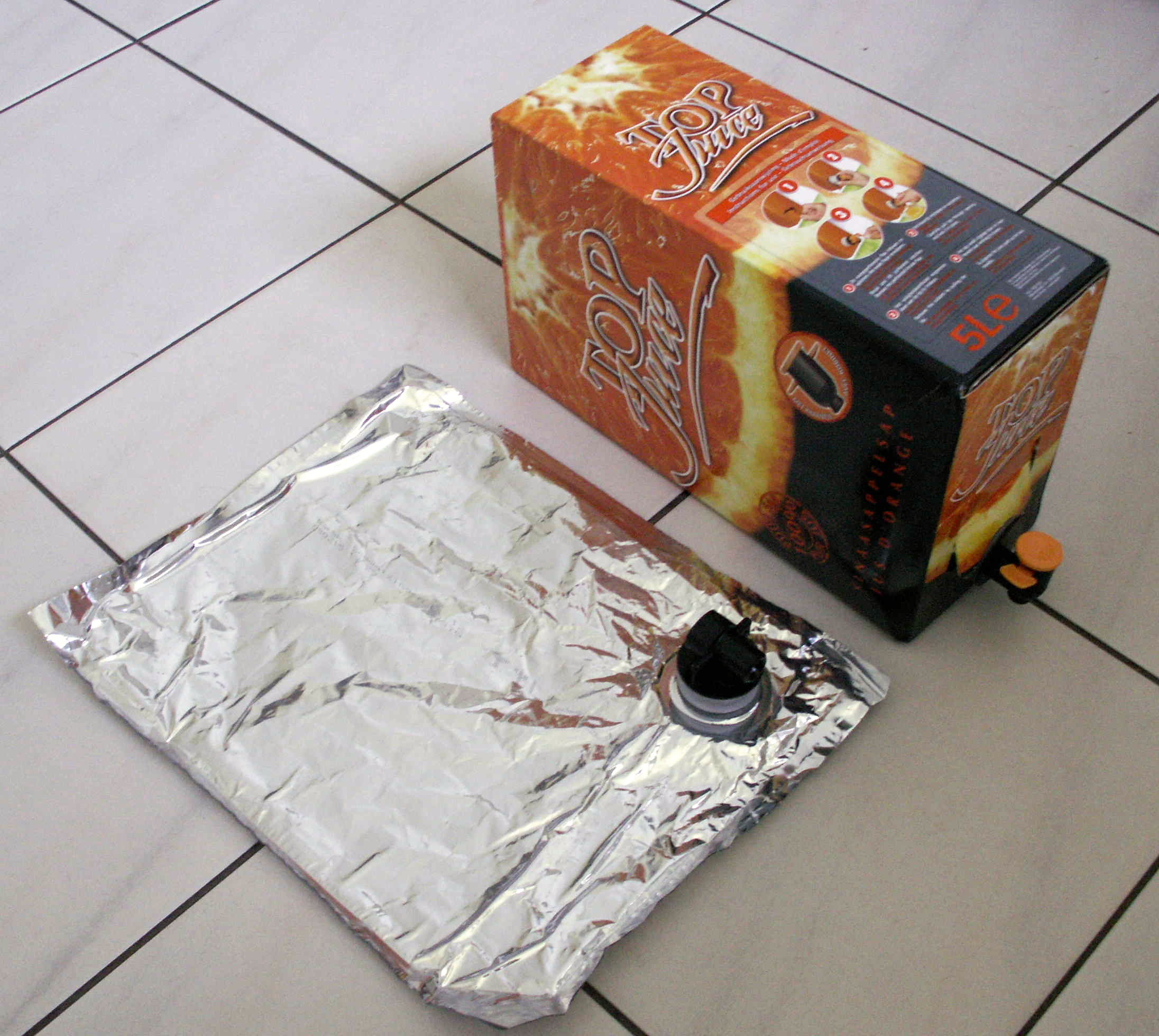
The bag from a box of wine is known as a "goon bag" or "goonsack"

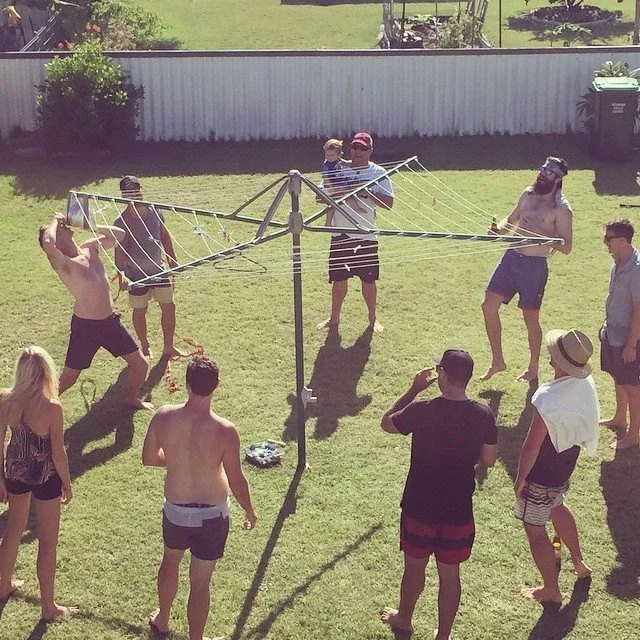
Australians playing the game "Goon of Fortune"

Goon of Fortune, sometimes called Wheel of Goon, is an Australian drinking game involving cheap cask wine (colloquially known as "goon"), played between any number of people. The name is a spoof of the TV show Wheel of Fortune.

A number of goonsacks are pegged around the outside of a rotary washing line. Players sit underneath it at the edges and agree on how much wine each "win" involves. One player spins the hoist, and when the spin stops the winner(s) nearest to a bag or bags must drink that amount. Players may not touch the clothesline, and penalties for breaking the rules vary.

== See also ==
- Hills Hoist – an eponym for rotary washing (also known as clothes lines) in Australia and sometimes New Zealand.
- List of drinking games
