= Gilbert Toyne =

Australian inventor of the rotary clothes hoist

- Born: 23 August 1888. Darriwill, Victoria, Australia
- Died: 30 July 1983 (aged 94); Upper Ferntree Gully, Victoria
- Known for: Rotary clothes hoist

Gilbert Toyne (23 August 1888 – 30 July 1983) was an Australian inventor.

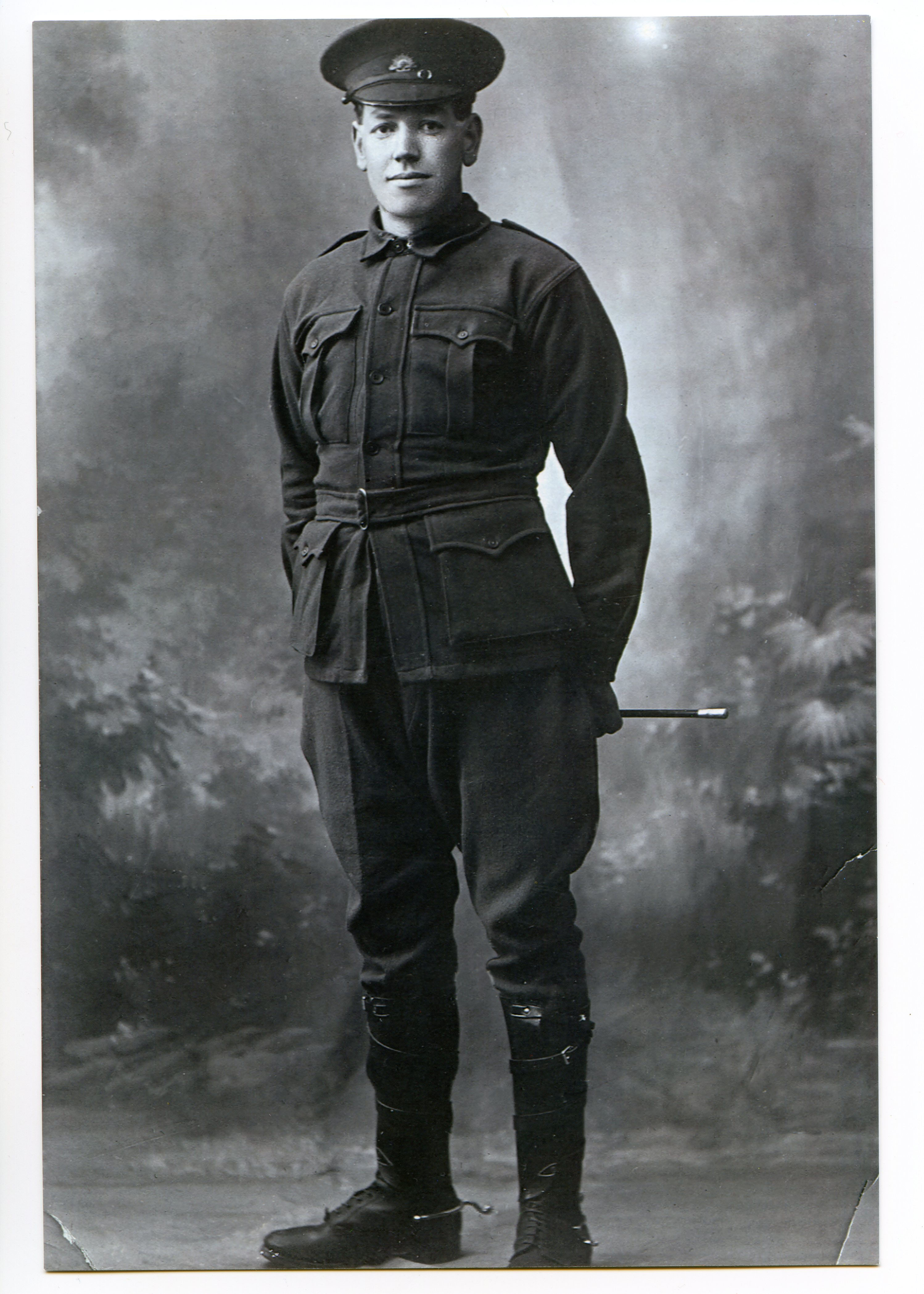
Gilbert Toyne c.1915

He was born at Darriwill, Victoria, and trained as a blacksmith, wheelwright and farrier. Toyne invented, patented and marketed four rotary clothes hoist designs in Australia. His 1925 all-metal rotary clothes hoist patent would become the standard design for clothes hoist manufacturers in the following decades.

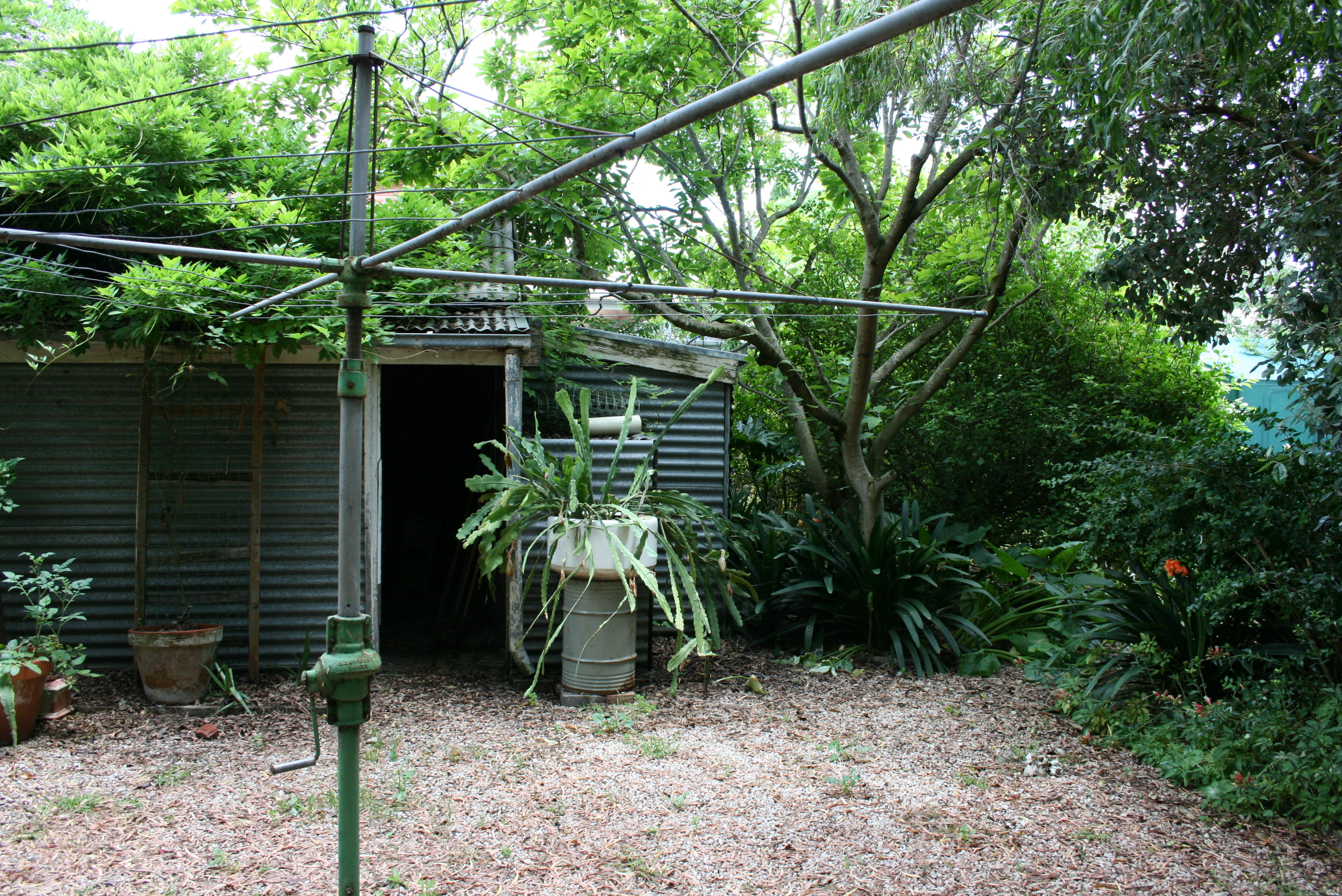
Gilbert Toyne's 1926 patented clothes hoist, Adelaide

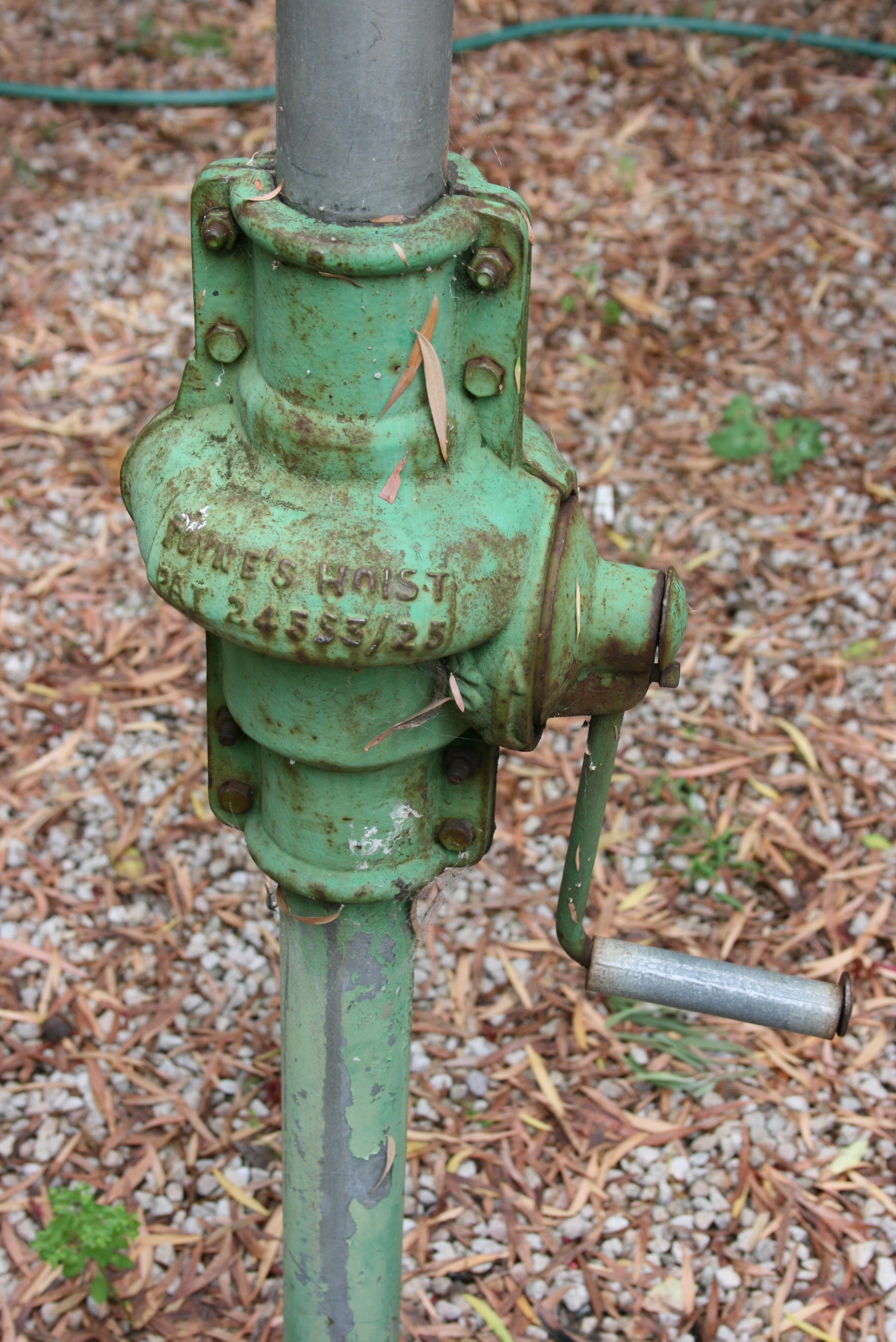
A close-up of the winding mechanism of the 1926 Toyne hoist

As one of 13 children, the large amount of resulting laundry led Toyne to see the need for an improved clothes line design. In 1911, with fellow blacksmith Lambert Downey, he patented "Improvements in clothes hoists and the like" (Australian Patent No. 1276/11). Together they established the Aeroplane Clothes Hoist Company, with an office in Queen Street, Melbourne. A family relative, Henry William Barnes, became involved in the company. To help manufacture, promote and reduce the price of Toyne's clothes hoists, Barnes established the Aeroplane Hoist Manufacturing Company of Australasia Limited on 13 August 1913. This business acquired the assets of the previous company.

The Toyne rotary clothes hoist was marketed at state agricultural shows and interstate agents were sought. Some of the advantages of the rotary clothes hoist listed in promotional material were the "quick drying powers, due to the revolving lines; saving in labour, due to clothes being hung from one position; economy of ground space; and durability, as with proper treatment the 'Aeroplane' should last forever".

Toyne's life and the progress of his rotary clothes hoist business was affected by contemporary events. The two world wars halted production of the clothes hoist and the Great Depression slowed its popular acceptance. Toyne served in World War I and returned home to face personal turmoil in 1919. However, still passionately committed to promoting the clothes hoist, he developed a new design and patented 'Rotary clothes hoist' (Australian Patent No. 11373/23) in 1923. This design used a rack-and-pinion method to raise the clothes line frame. Then in 1925 he patented 'Improvements in and relating to hoisting mechanism especially applicable to rotary clothes lines' (Australian Patent No. 24553/25). This model had an enclosed crown wheel-and-pinion winding mechanism that would define the standard for Australian rotary clothes hoists for decades to follow.

Toyne sold the rights to manufacture his rotary clothes hoist designs in Victoria, Australia to Archibald McKirdy in 1925. The McKirdy family were significant promoters of Toyne's hoists until the 1960s. They established Toyne's Rotary Clothes Hoist Pty Ltd and McKirdy's son also patented and marketed several of his own clothes hoists designs.

Toyne relocated to Adelaide, South Australia in 1926, in order to establish manufacturing centres for his clothes hoist design in other Australian states.

Toyne's clothes hoist advert. News (Adelaide) 19 June 1926

He sold the rights to manufacture and sell Toyne rotary clothes hoists in South Australia and Western Australia to Leonard Lambert in 1928. Moving to Sydney, New South Wales in 1929, Toyne established a clothes hoist business at 661 Parramatta Road, Five Dock.

During the 20th century, a number of companies were established primarily to manufacture, promote and sell the Toyne's clothes hoists, including, the Aeroplane Clothes Hoist Company, Toyne's Rotary Clothes Hoist Pty Ltd, Toyne Trading Company and the Quick-Dry Revolving Clothes Line Company. Toyne first used the term "rotary clothes hoist" around 1912 and by the 1930s, Toyne's rotary clothes hoists were available for purchase throughout Australia and New Zealand. Manufacturing bases had been established in Melbourne, Adelaide and Sydney, with others states having distribution through major retail stores.

Gilbert Toyne's final patented rotary clothes hoist design was in 1945 "Improvements relating to hydraulic clothes hoists" (Australian Patent No. 128009) Hydraulic clothes hoists used fluid as a means of raising and lowering the clothes line frame. At least seven hydraulic clothes hoists had been patented in Australia prior to Toyne's design. He also developed several other inventions to improve efficiency in the laundry, including the "Eezewac" clothes lifting device and a gas regulator for the wash copper (Australian Patent No. 18078/29).

Toyne's efforts to be a leading manufacturer in the growing Australian rotary clothes hoist market were affected by world events and personal loss. Having established ongoing production of his patent design in Sydney, he returned to Melbourne in 1933 and continued manufacturing clothes hoists well into the latter years of his life. During the "baby boom", and the housing boom, that followed World War II, rotary clothes hoists based on Toyne's 1926 patented design came to dominate Australian backyards. He died on 30 July 1983, aged 94 years, at Upper Ferntree Gully, Victoria. He lived to see his classic 1926 rotary clothes hoist design regularly, but incorrectly, credited to Lance Hill of Hills Hoists.
