= Overhead clothes airer =

Ceiling-mounted mechanism to dry clothes

Modern hanging clothes horse with pulley system

An overhead clothes airer, also known variously as a pulley maid, sheila maid, kitchen or clothes maid, ceiling clothes airer, laundry airer, pulley airer, laundry rack, or laundry pulley, is a ceiling-mounted mechanism to dry clothes. It is also known as, in the North of England, a creel and in Scotland, a pulley.

== History ==
Overhead clothes airers were often installed, from the late eighteenth century onwards, in the laundry room of large houses and estates in Europe. Originally made by the estate handyman, by the middle of the 19th century they almost always benefited from a rope and pulley system to raise and lower the rack, and such systems began to be manufactured and sold commercially, both in Europe and America. Larger, wealthier or commercial properties sometimes had drying cabinets or drying rooms associated with their laundry rooms, in addition to or instead of clothes airers. The cabinets were of wood or cast iron, with a series of drying racks on wheels which were pulled in or out of the cabinet horizontally. The cabinet was heated by coal, gas or wood. The Shaker community still uses these cabinets. Similar drying cabinets exist today, powered by electricity, but are intended for delicate clothing unsuitable for a powered clothes dryer, rather than for general drying. However, although the washing of laundry became mechanised and electrified in the twentieth century, even households that can afford electric clothes driers may also use a clothes airer, and its environmentally friendly qualities have led to a resurgence in its popularity, with a number of new manufacturers springing up in recent decades.

There are electric overhead airers, which lower and raise themselves.

== Description ==
The airer consists of a rack with several horizontal wooden rails or laths, suspended in two mounts or rack ends which were originally cast iron, but may be other metals or alloys today. The rack ends serve to hold and space the rails, and act as points to secure the cords that raise and lower the unit. Cords go from the metal tether points to pulleys mounted on the ceiling, and then to a cleat hook mounted on the wall.

The defining feature of this airer is its pulley system. The airer is lowered to be loaded or unloaded, then raised to move the items up into warmer air and as out of the way of room occupants as the ceiling height allows.

A pulley clothes airer is sometimes also described as "Victorian", "Edwardian", or "Lancashire" and then comprises two iron frames positioned as far apart as desired to provide a suitable length, with wooden laths, typically four or six, passed through holes in them. The frames are suspended from the ceiling by a system of rope and pulleys. The result is a hoistable rack with several parallel bars on which clothes can be draped out of the way, or hung, extending further down, with clothes hangers.

A modern development uses a wooden frame with seven to eleven continuous clothes lines which increase the capacity of the clothes horse. The frame uses a clam cleat to tighten the clothes lines and hangs on four ropes. This increases the necessary installation effort, but also improves safety by increasing redundancy of the suspension. It uses a pulley system (block and tackle) which reduces the required force to lift the loaded frame.

If the airer is allowed to swing perpendicularly to the direction of the bars, the practicality of the device can be improved: Taking inspiration from the working principles of the Punka, the movement of the clothes will produce a fanning effect to whatever is beneath it. Furthermore, the resulting movement of air would reduce the time it takes for the clothing to dry. Much like the Punka, some force will be required, but this will still be minimal when compared to the use of tumble drier.

== See also ==
- Clothes horse
- Clothes line
- Airing Cupboard
- Clothes dryer
- Laundry
- Mangle
