= Clothes horse =

Frame for air drying wet laundry

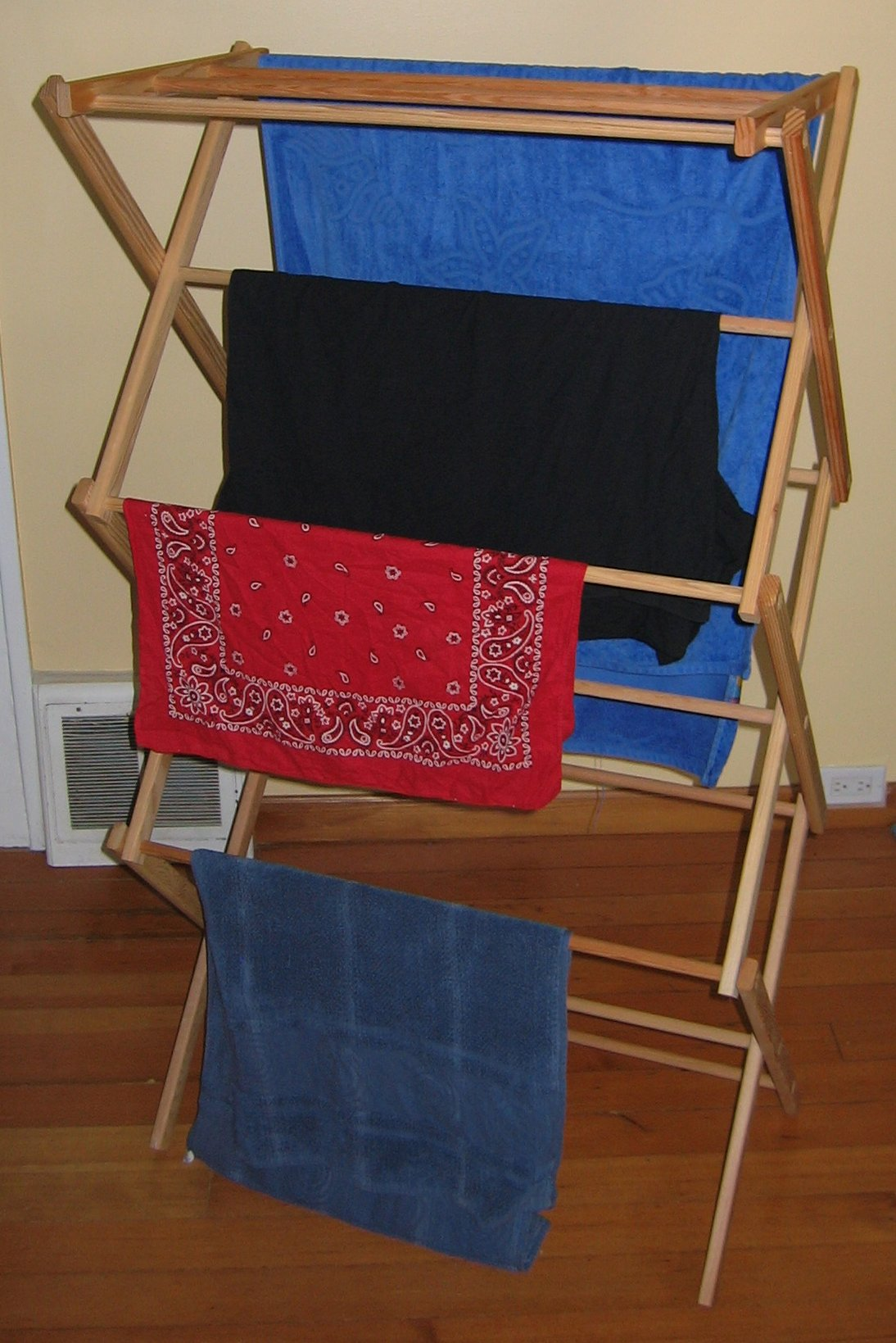
A clothes horse

A clothes horse is a portable frame, usually made of wood, metal, or plastic, upon which wet laundry is hung to dry by evaporation.

== Usage and alternatives ==
Clothes horses are a cheap, low-tech type of laundry equipment, in contrast to a clothes dryer, which requires electricity or natural gas to operate, or a clothes line or Hills Hoist, which requires ample outdoor space, wind, and fine weather. In the past, they also served as an alternative to airing cupboards. In cold, damp seasons and in the absence of central heating, a clothes horse placed by a fireside or a kitchen range provides a place to warm clothing before putting it on. The practice of airing, once common in Great Britain (for example, in the constant battle against damp and mold), has become far less frequent with the advent of central heating and affordable clothes dryers.

== Terminology ==
Other names for this device include a clothes rack, drying horse, clothes maiden, drying rack, scissor rack, drying stand, or airer.

Winter-dyke is a Scots word for a clothes horse used for drying clothing indoors. The word 'dyke' means a wall or a fence made without mortar; walls of this type were occasionally used for hanging laundry in the summer months.

== Types ==
There are many types of clothes horses, including large, stationary outdoor ones, smaller, folding portable racks, and wall-mounted drying racks. A clothes horse is similar in usage and function to a clothes line and serves as an alternative to a powered clothes dryer. An electric alternative exists, usually known as a heated clothes airer.

An overhead clothes airer can be lowered by its pulley mechanism to a convenient height for loading wet laundry, and then hoisted out of the way to ceiling height while the clothes dry.

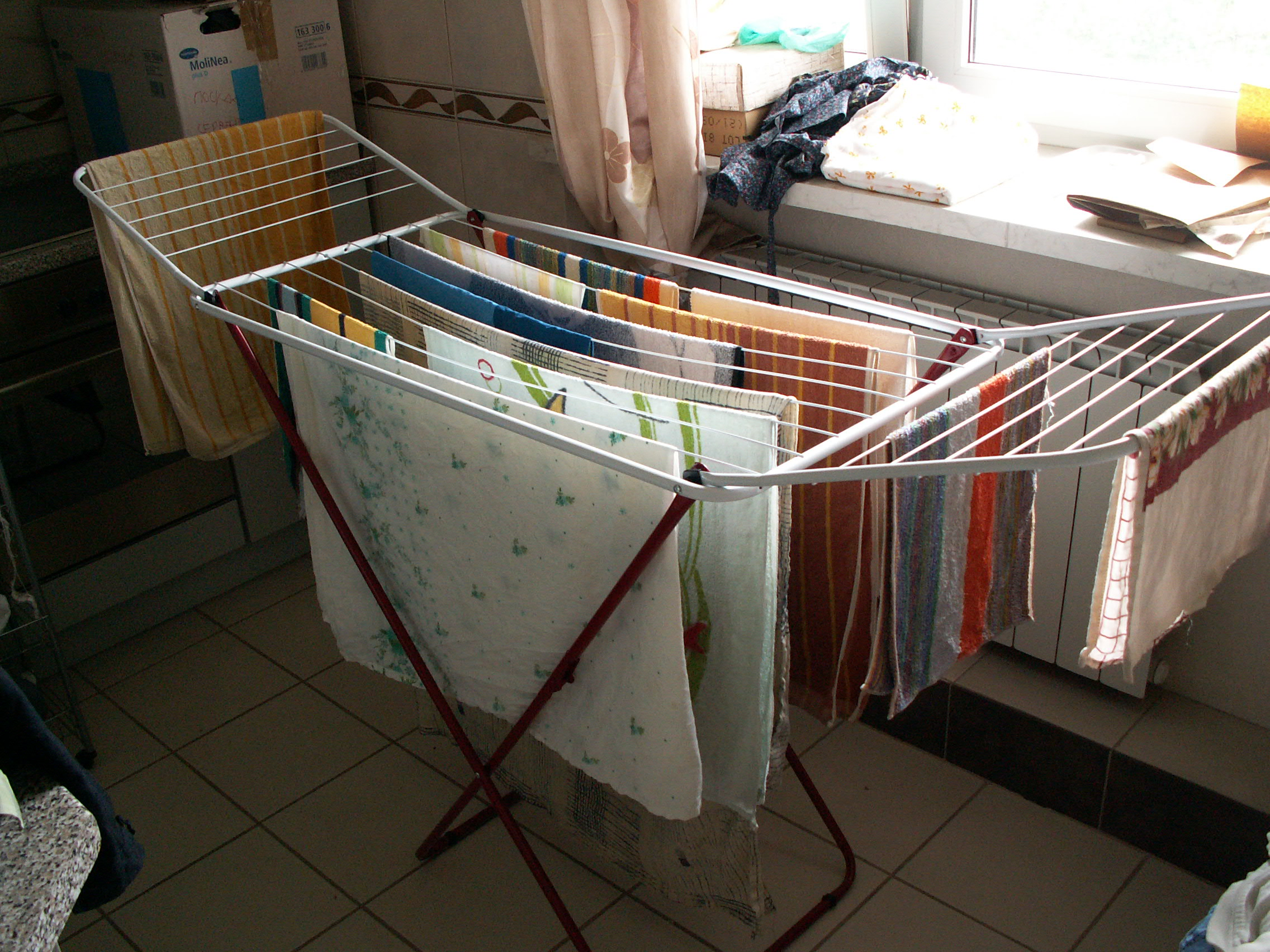
A drying rack

An overhead clothes airer with pulleys

== Factors that determine the drying duration ==
Various factors determine the duration of drying and can help to decide whether to use a drier or a clothes line, including:

- Temperature – increase in temperature decreases the drying duration
- Humidity – decrease in humidity will decrease the drying duration
- Ventilation – if the window is open it will decrease the drying duration
- Room size – in bigger rooms it will take less time for clothes to dry
- Wind velocity – a fan near the clothes when drying them indoors will decrease the drying duration
- Cloth thickness

== Figurative usage ==
The term clothes horse can be used to describe people who are passionate about clothing and always appear in public dressed in the latest styles. From 1850, the term referred to a male dandy or female quaintrelle, a person whose main function is, or appears to be, to wear or show off clothes. In this context, the term is similar to "fashion plate", which originally referred to a lithograph illustration of fashionable clothing in a book or magazine.

The term clothes horse can also be used to describe people who are employed primarily to display clothing. The term is often used pejoratively, for example, to imply that an actor or actress has been cast in a role primarily to show off costumes rather than for their acting ability.

== See also ==
- Laundry-folding machine
