= Simon Toyne =

British writer

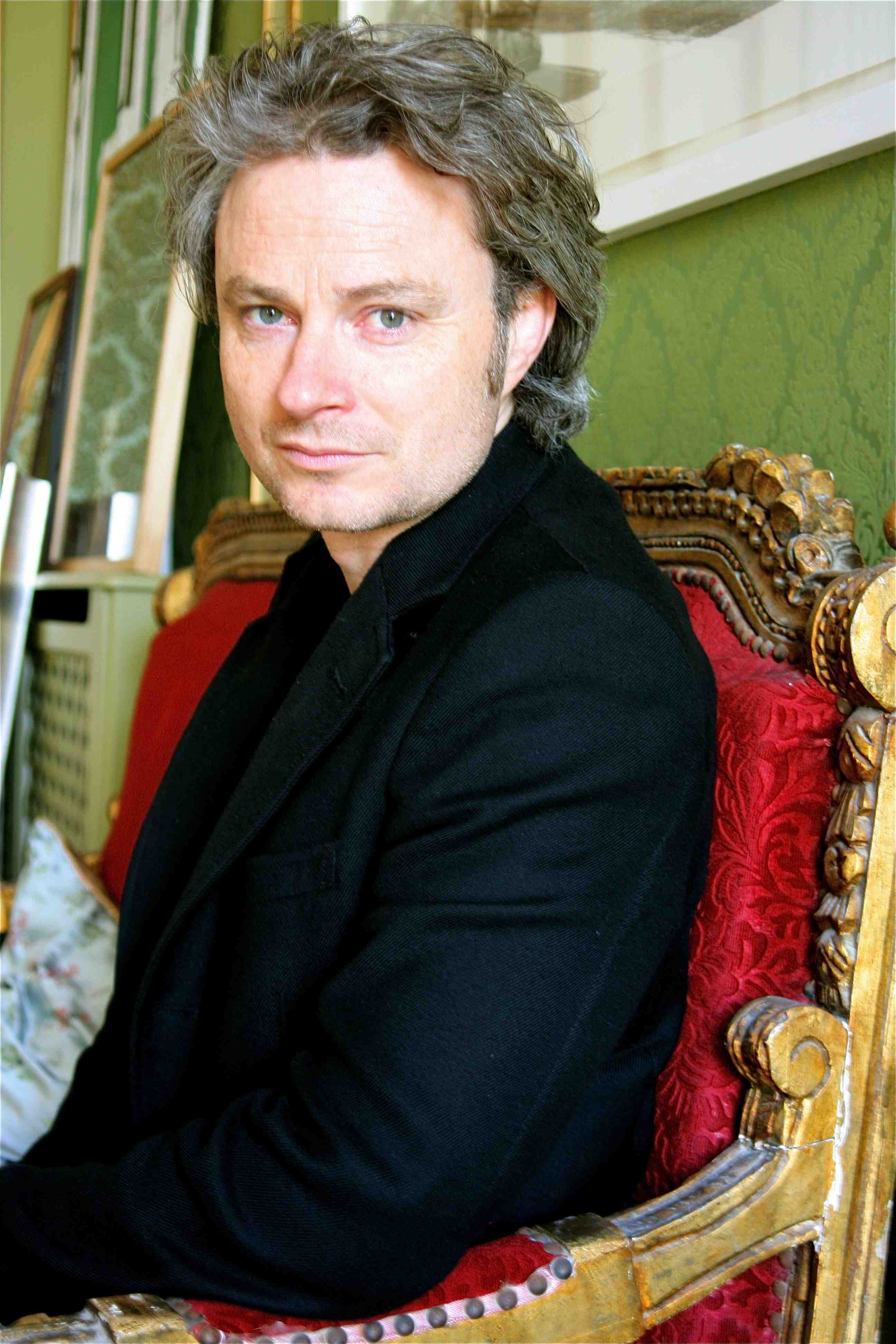
- Self-portrait photograph
- Born: Simon James Toyne; 29 February 1968 (age 58); Cleethorpes, North Lincolnshire, United Kingdom
- Education: Goldsmiths College
- Occupation: Novelist
- Spouse: Kathryn Rayward (m.2003)
- Children: Roxanna Toyne, Stanley Toyne, Betsy Toyne
- Writing career
- Language: English
- Genres: Thriller, adventure, mystery, conspiracy
- Notable works: Sanctus; The Key; The Tower; Solomon Creed; The Boy Who Saw
- Website: www.simontoyne.net

Simon Toyne (born 29 February 1968) is a British writer of thriller fiction, including the Sanctus Trilogy and Solomon Creed series.

== Works ==
=== Sancti Trilogy ===
- Sanctus (2011)
- The Key (2012)
- The Tower (2013)

=== Solomon Creed Series ===
1. The Searcher (2015)
2. The Boy Who Saw (2017)
- Broken Promise (Solomon Creed #1.5) (2018)

=== Rees and Khan Thrillers ===
- Dark Objects (2022)
- Blood Traces (2023)
- Dead Water (2025)
