= Hills Hoist =

Height-adjustable rotary clothes line

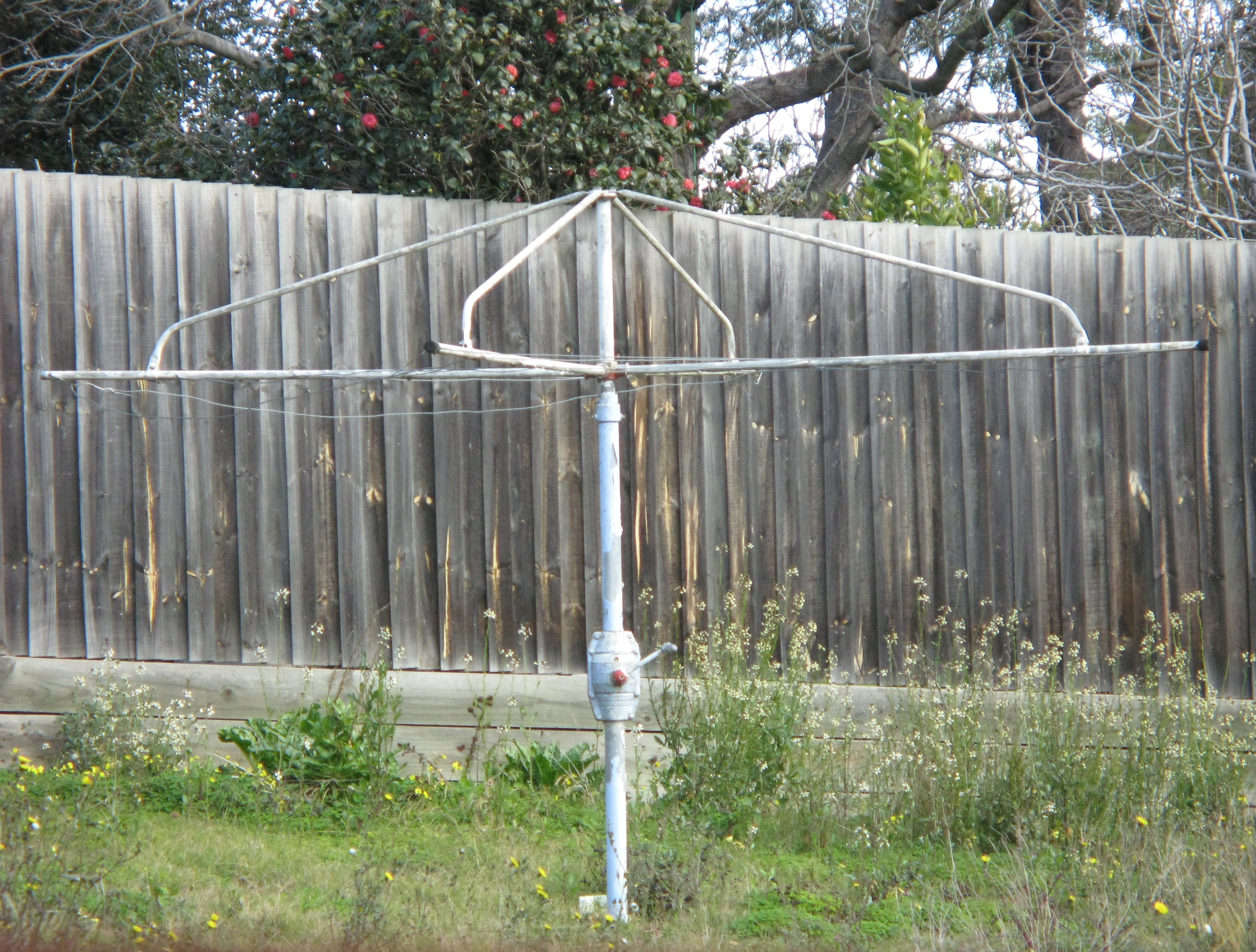
A Hills Hoist in a backyard in Balwyn, Melbourne

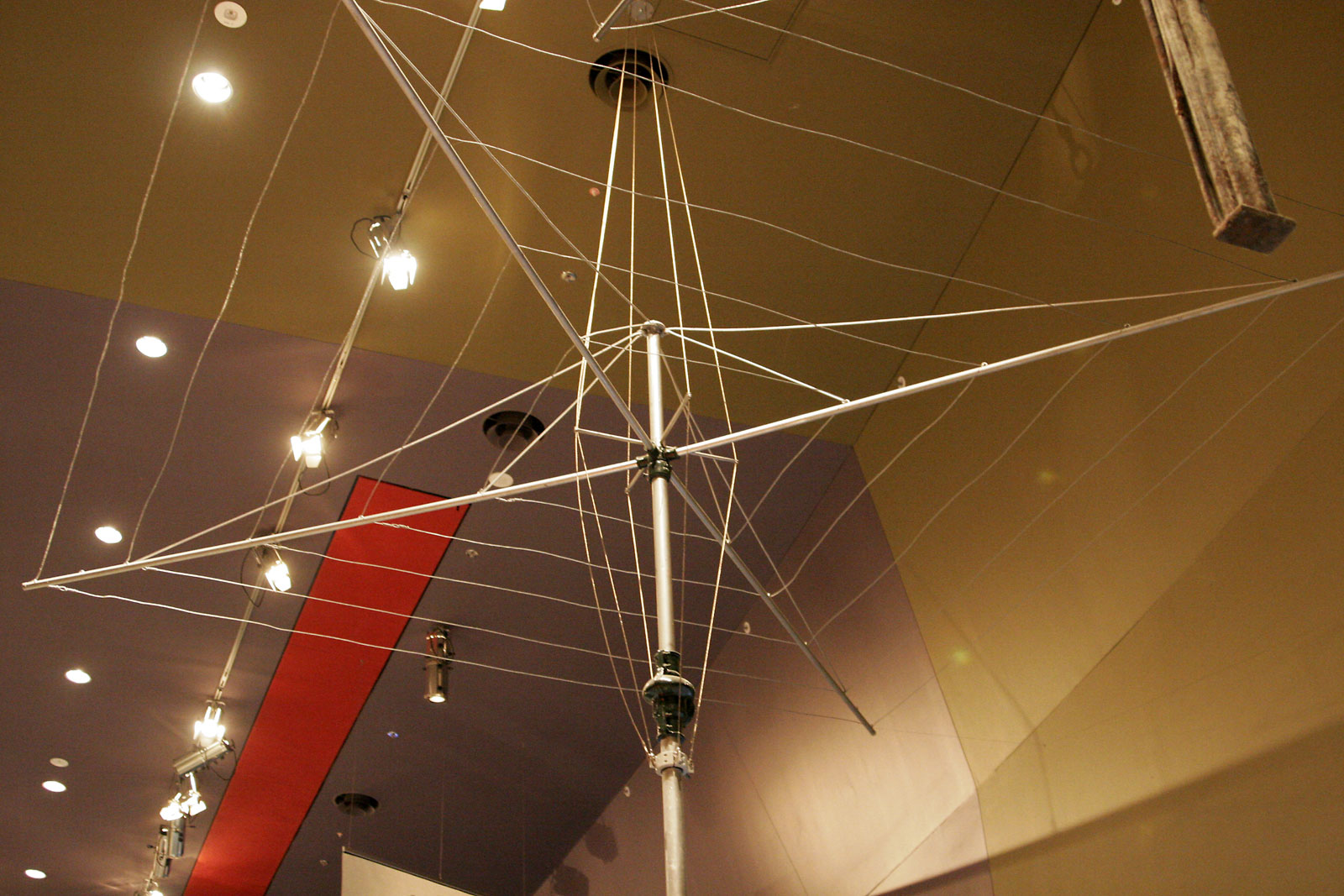
An early model in the National Museum of Australia in Canberra

A Hills Hoist is a height-adjustable rotary clothes line, designed to permit the compact hanging of wet clothes so that their maximum area can be exposed for wind drying by rotation. They are considered one of Australia's most recognisable icons, and are used frequently by artists as a metaphor for Australian suburbia in the 1950s and 1960s.

For decades, beginning in 1945, the devices were mainly manufactured in Adelaide, South Australia, based on prior product designs purchased by Lance Hill from the Australian inventor Gerhard "Pop" Kaesler and related expired patents. The local emphasis led to Hills Hoist becoming the generic term for rotary clothes lines in Australia. The manufacturer soon became nationally market-dominant and rotary washing (clothes) lines have become common across much of the world. Direct successors to his product are now mostly manufactured in China.

== History ==
As early as 1895, Colin Stewart and Allan Harley of Sun Foundry in Adelaide applied for a patent for an "Improved rotary and tilting clothes drying rack". In their design the uppermost part tilted to allow access to the hanging lines.

Gilbert Toyne of Geelong patented, manufactured and marketed four rotary clothes hoists designs between 1911 and 1946. Toyne's first patented clothes hoist was sold through the Aeroplane Clothes Hoist Company established in 1911, before the First World War.

After returning from World War I, Toyne continued to perfect his designs, despite his own troubles stemming from injuries suffered from the war. In 1925, he patented an all-metal rotary clothes hoist with its enclosed crown wheel-and-pinion winding mechanism and began selling them the following year. (Note: Australian Patent No. 24553/25)

Prolific South Australian inventor Gerhard "Pop" Kaesler also designed a modern rotary clothesline two decades before they went into commercial production in Adelaide; subsequently he sold his metre-high wooden prototype model and plans to Lance Hill. In 1945, Hill began to manufacture the rotary clothes hoist in his backyard – his wife apparently wanted an inexpensive replacement to the line and prop she had for drying clothes, as there was no longer sufficient room on the line because of her growing lemon tree.

Lance Hill's brother-in-law, Harold Ling, returned from the war and joined him to form a partnership in 1946. Ling became the key figure in expanding the production and marketing of the Hills hoist, with a possessive apostrophe omitted from the outset.

In 1947, Hills Hoists began manufacturing a windable clothes hoist which was identical to Toyne's expired 1925 patent with the crown wheel-and-pinion winding mechanism.

Initially the clothes hoists were constructed and sold from Lance Hill's home on Bevington Road, Glenunga. Soon production moved to a nearby site on Glen Osmond Road and in 1954 the factory relocated to a much larger site previously owned by coachbuilders A. Pengelley & Co on South Road, Edwardstown. The company Hills Hoists became Hills Industries in 1958.

In 1974, a Darwin family reported that the only thing left standing after Cyclone Tracy was their Hills Hoist.

In 2017, Hills Industries sold the manufacturing and sale rights of its Hills Home Living brands to AMES Australasia, a subsidiary of the United States Griffon Corporation. As of 2018 Austral ClothesHoists and Daytek Australia are the only Australian manufacturers of rotary clotheslines.

== Cultural impacts ==
Hills Hoists are considered one of Australia's most recognisable icons, and are used frequently by artists as a metaphor for Australian suburbia in the 1950s and 1960s. The Hills Hoist is listed as a National Treasure by the National Library of Australia. The closing ceremony of the 2000 Sydney Olympics featured giant roaming Hills Hoist robots.

In 2019, as part of The Great Aussie Coin Hunt, the Royal Australian Mint released a $1 coin commemorating the Hills Hoist, along with other Australian "icons" such as meat pies and quokkas.

== See also ==
- Clothes horse – a different device for drying clothes
- Hammersmith Hills Hoists – Rugby League Football Club
- Goon of Fortune – a drinking game involving a rotary line
- Gilbert Toyne – inventor and owner of four relevant patents (expired)
