= Clothes line =

Device for hanging and drying laundry

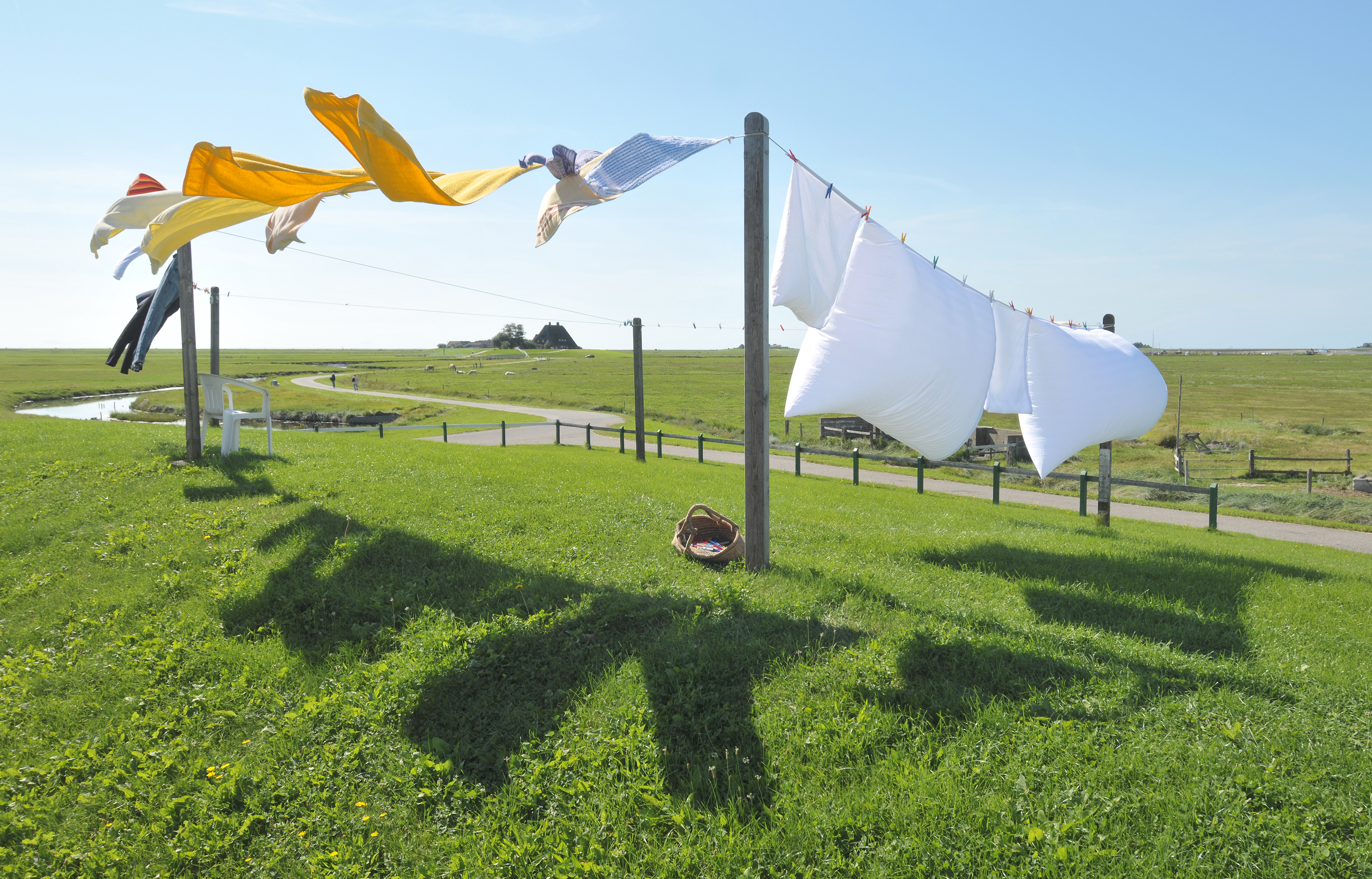
Clothes lines located on the islet of Hooge in northern Germany.

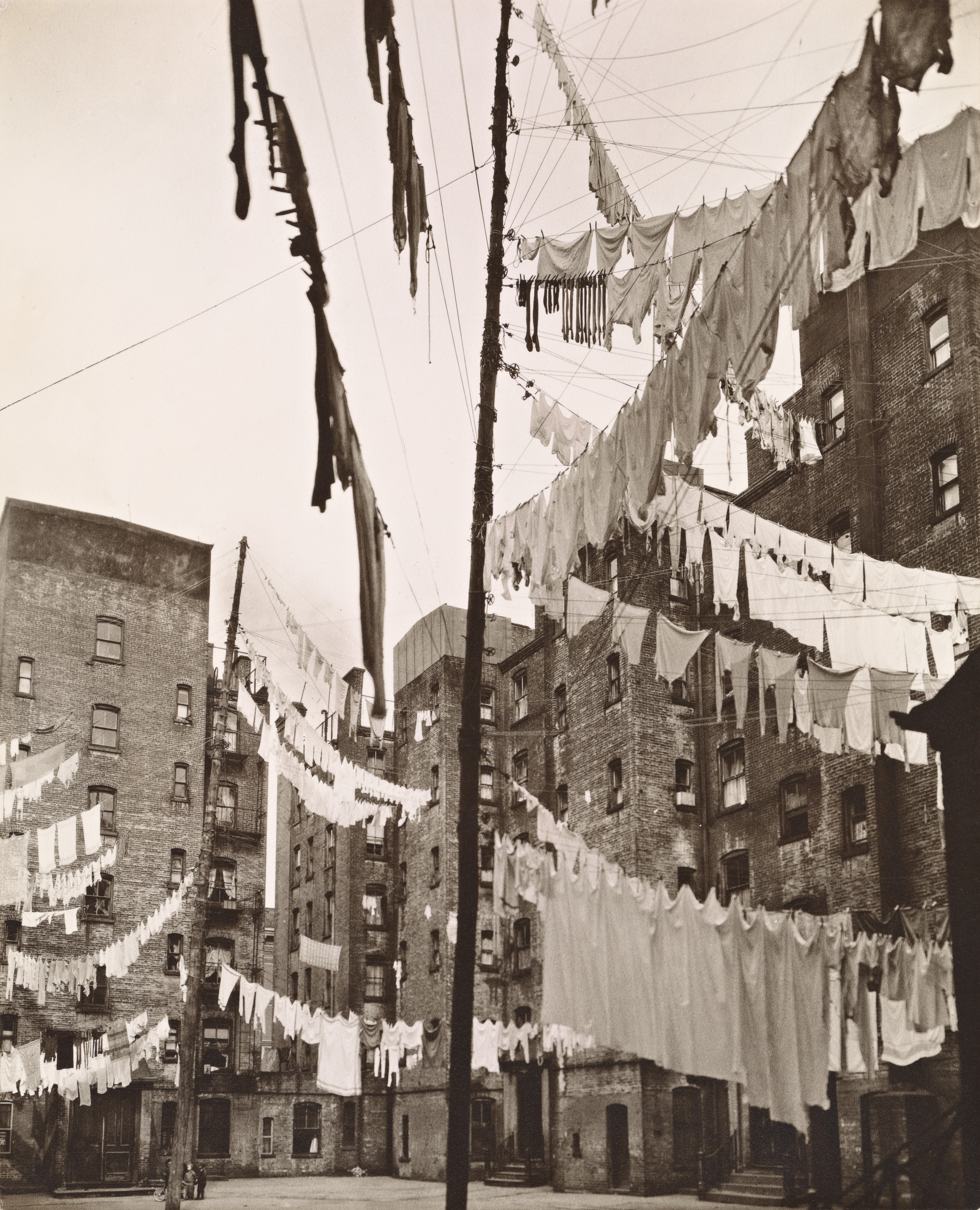
Clotheslines in tenement court, Manhattan, 1936

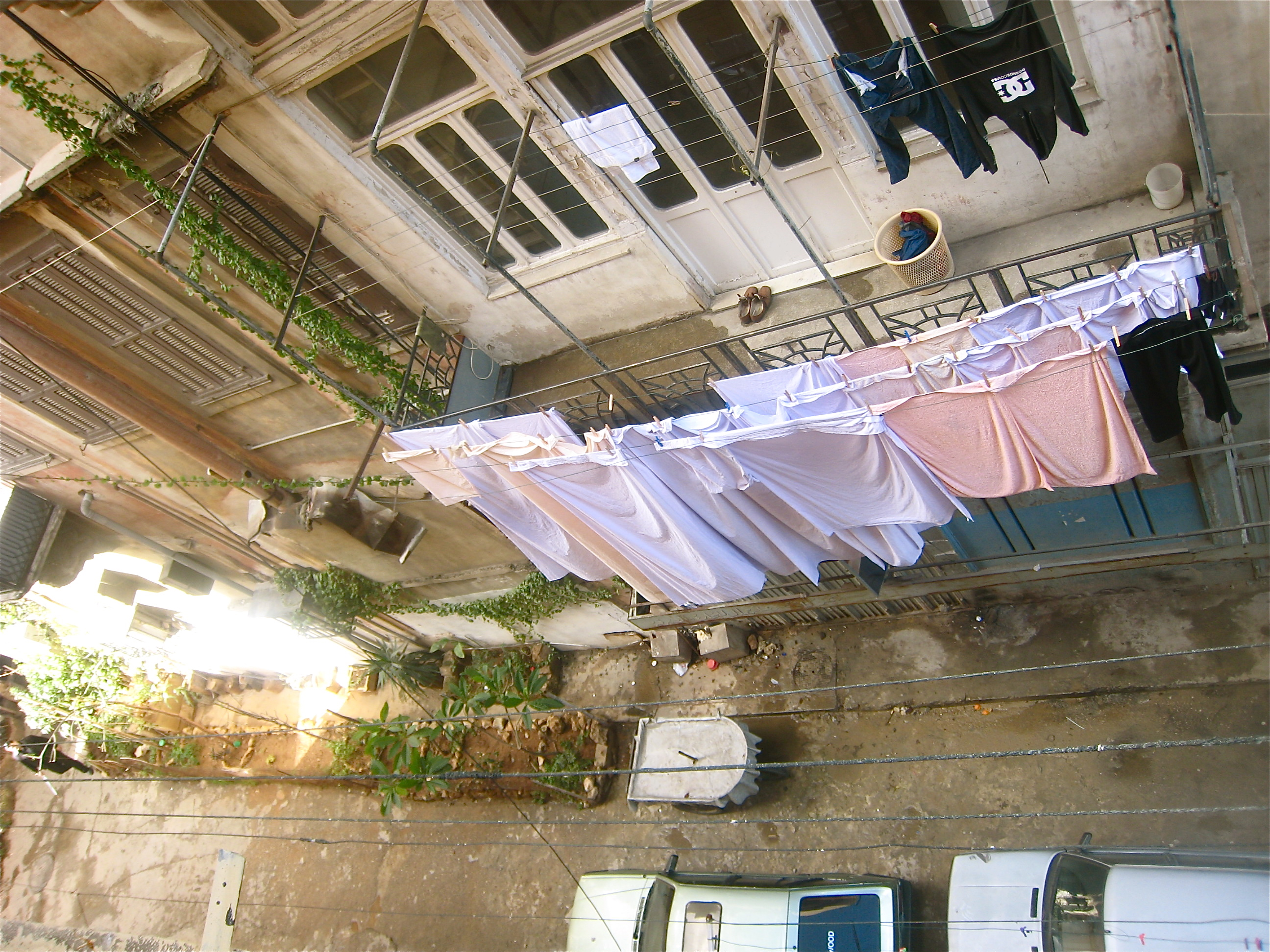
Clothes lines located in Tripoli in northern Lebanon.

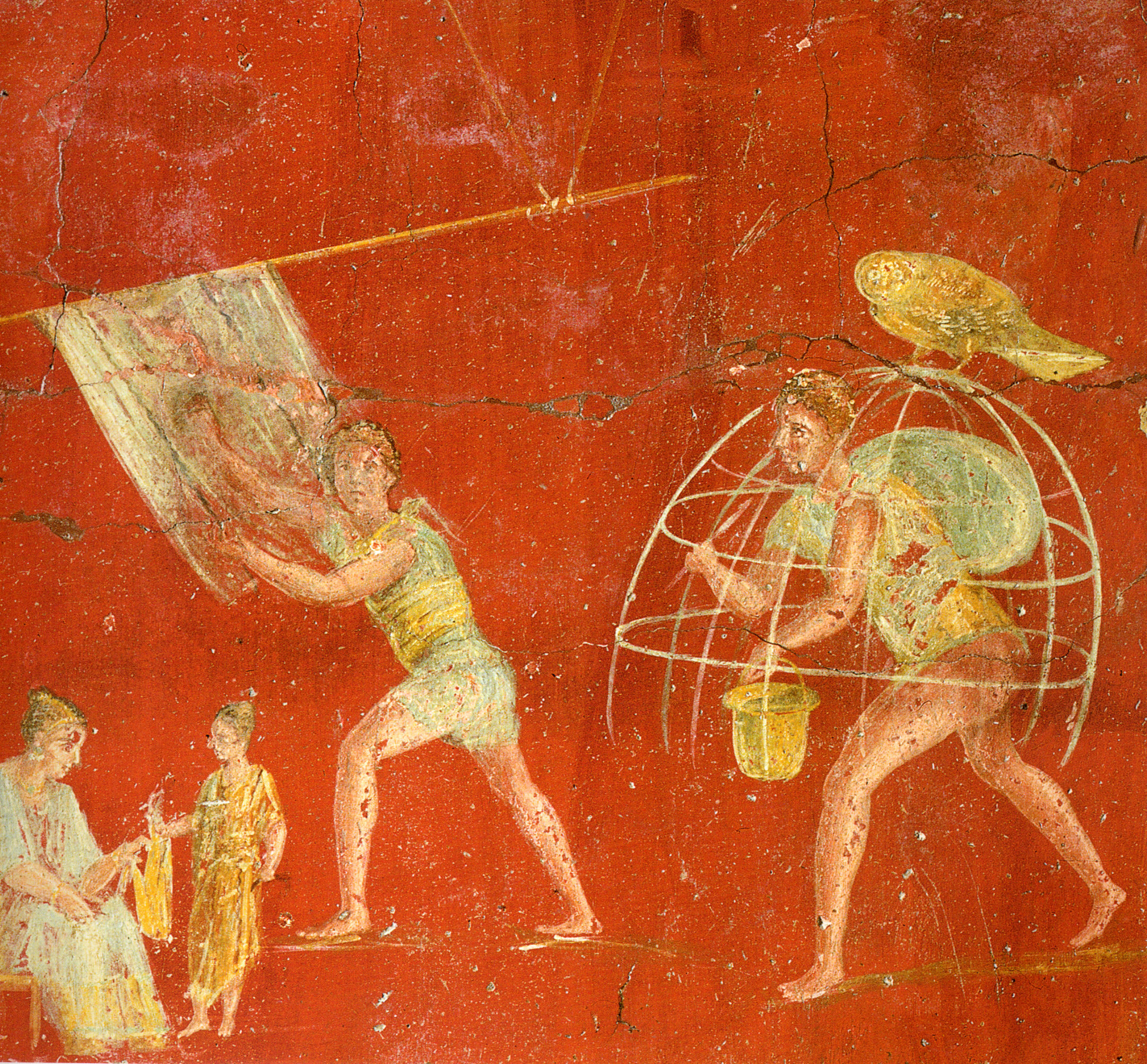
Fresco from a fullonica (laundry) in Pompeii, showing washing draped on a line without clothespins.

A clothes line, also spelled clothesline, also known as a wash line, is a device for hanging clothes on for the purpose of drying or airing out the articles. It is made of any type of rope, cord, wire, or twine that has been stretched between two points (e.g. two posts), outdoors or indoors, above ground level. Washing lines are attached either from a post or a wall, and are frequently located in back gardens, or on balconies. Longer washing lines often have props holding up the mid-section so the weight of the clothing does not pull the clothesline down to the ground.

Clothing that has recently been washed is hung over the line to dry. Nowadays it is held in place with clothespins, but until the 19th century laundry was simply draped over the line (and often blew away), as is visible in artistic depictions of clotheslines from earlier periods. The clothespin was not invented until 1809.

More elaborate rotary washing lines save space and are typically retractable and square or triangular in shape, with multiple lines being used (such as the Hills Hoist from Australia). Some can be folded up when not in use. In Scotland, many tenement buildings have a "drying green", which is a communal area predominantly used for clothes lines. A "drying green" may also be used as a recreational space for tenants. The overhead clothes airer is an indoor version hung at ceiling level and also raised and lowered with pulleys.

== Comparison with clothes dryer ==
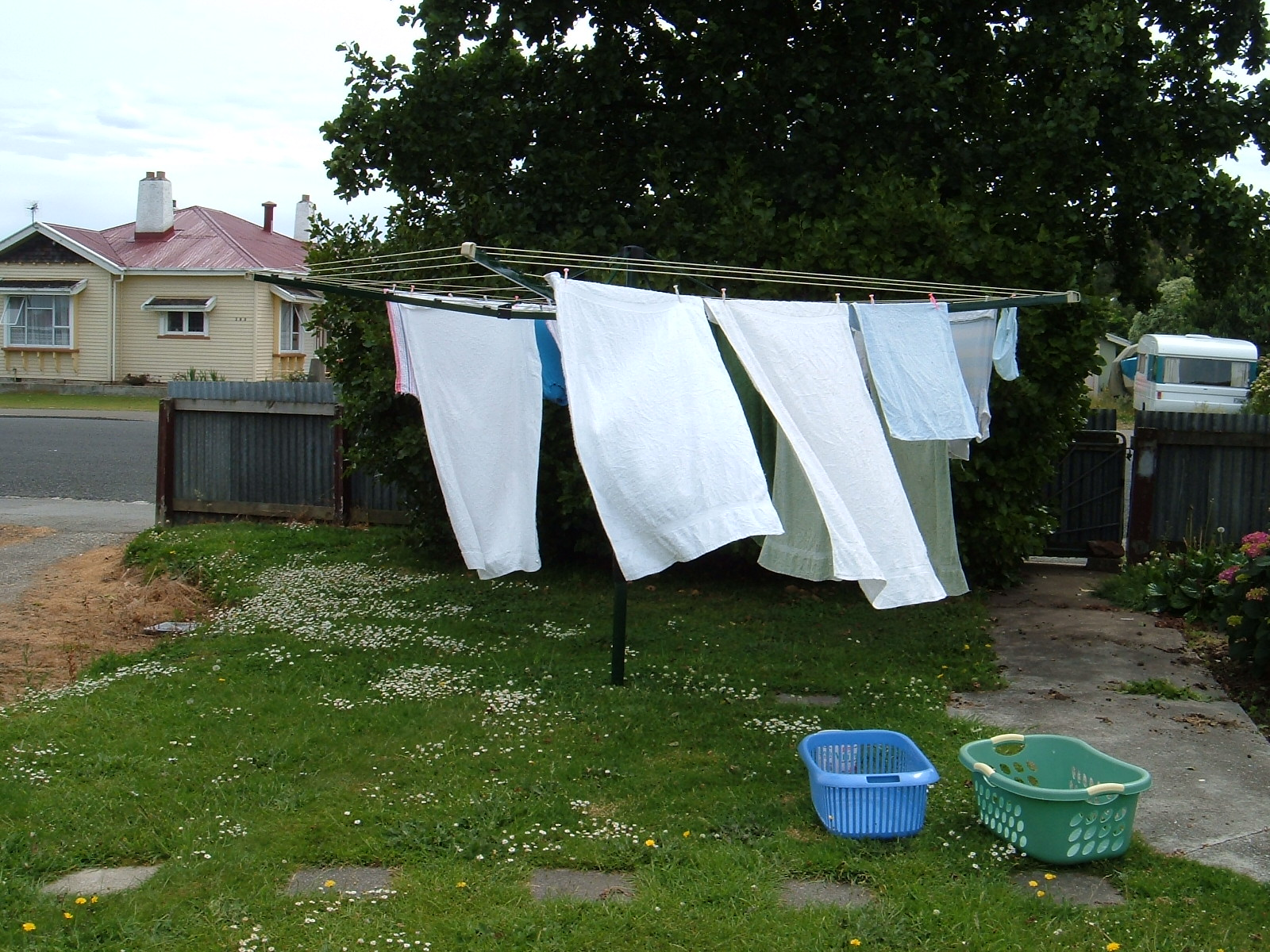
A rotary, or Hills Hoist, type of clothes line

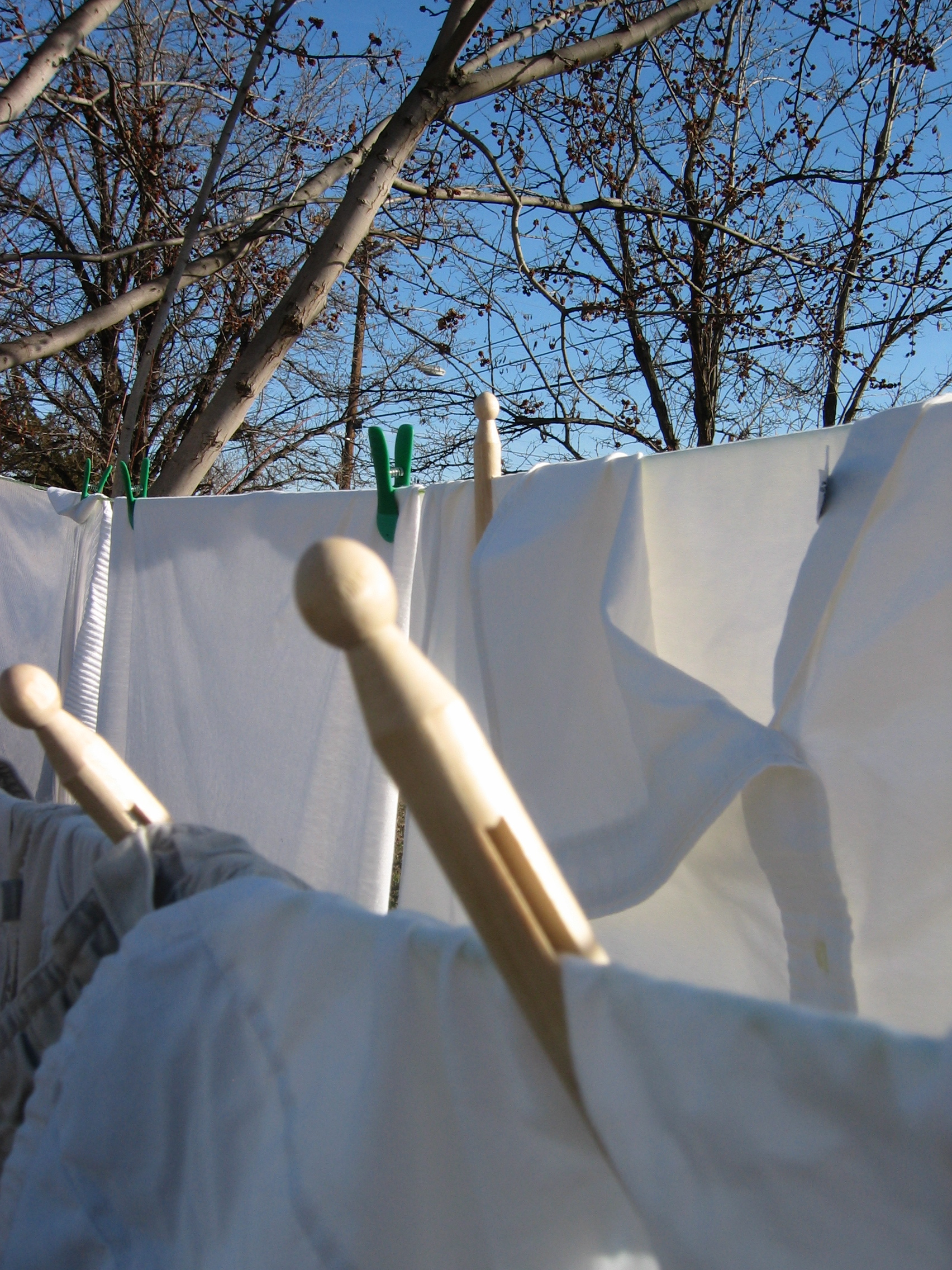
Sundrying in Hermiston, Oregon.

Both clothes lines and clothes dryers serve the same purpose: drying clothes that have been recently washed, or that are wet in general. Here are some advantages and disadvantages of using a clothes line instead of a mechanical dryer. Air drying saves money. It also has no greenhouse gas emissions (versus 2 kg CO_{2}eq of greenhouse gas emissions from the average mechanical clothes dryer per load). There is less fabric wear and tear. On the other hand, clothes dryers are significantly faster, whereas air drying is dependent on weather conditions, and takes longer. Neighbors may also find it aesthetically unpleasant.

The country with the highest fraction of clothes dryers is the United States, with 80% of households having one. The figure is 60% in the United Kingdom, 40% in Germany, and 30% in South Korea.

== Drying laundry indoors ==
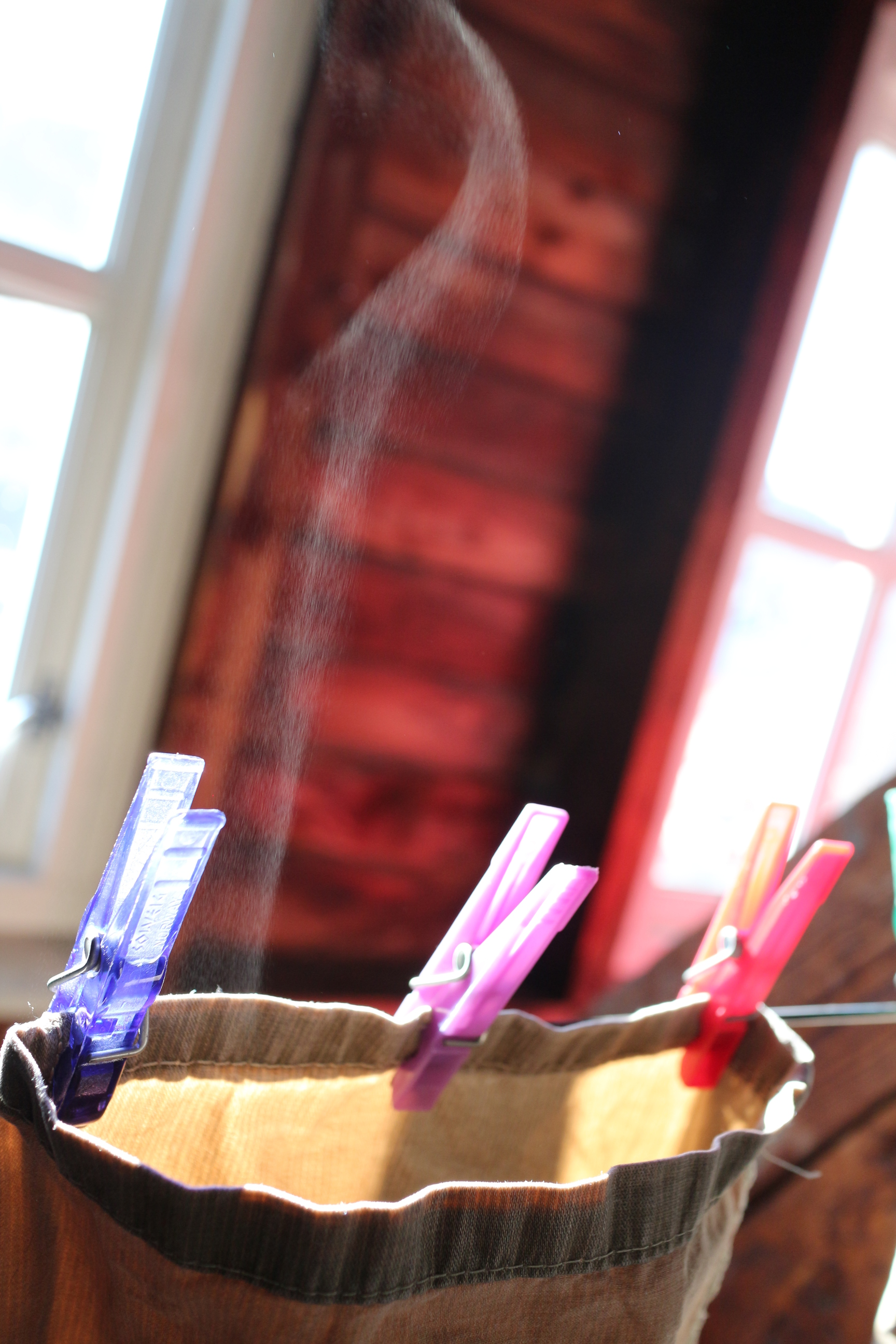
Clothes drying indoors

Laundry may be dried indoors rather than outdoors for a variety of reasons including:

- inclement weather
- physical disability
- lack of space for a line
- reduce the damage to fabrics from sun's UV rays
- legal restrictions
- to raise the humidity level indoors, and lower the air temperature indoors
- convenience
- to preserve privacy and as a safeguard against vandalism

Several types of devices are available for indoor drying. A clotheshorse can help save space in an apartment, or clothes lines can be strung in the basement during the winter. Small loads can simply be draped over furniture or a shower curtain pole. The drying time indoors will typically be longer than outdoor drying because of the lack of direct solar radiation and of the convective assistance of the wind.

The evaporation of the moisture from the clothes will cool the indoor air and increase the humidity level, which may or may not be desirable. In cold, dry weather, moderate increases in humidity make most people feel more comfortable. In warm weather, increased humidity makes most people feel even hotter. Increased humidity can also increase growth of fungi, which can cause health problems.

An average-sized wash load will convert approximately 4965 kilojoules of ambient heat into latent heat that is stored in the evaporated water, as follows. A typical 4 kg load of laundry can contain 2.2 kg of water, after being spun in a laundry machine. To determine how much heat has been converted in drying a load of laundry, weigh the clothes when they are wet and then again after the clothes have dried. The difference is the weight of the water that was evaporated from them. Multiply that weight in kg by 2,257 kJ/kg, which is the heat of vaporization per kilogram, to obtain the number of kilojoules that went into evaporating the water, or multiply by 0.6250 kWh/kg to get kilowatt-hours. If the moisture later condenses inside the house, the latent heat will return to ambient heat which could increase the temperature of the air in the room slightly. To obtain a good approximation of the effect this would have in a particular situation, the process can be traced on a psychrometric chart.

== Factors that determine the drying duration ==
Various factors determine the duration of drying and can help to decide whether to use a drier or a clothes line

- Placement of clothes line
- The environmental temperature - increase of temperature decreases the drying duration
- The environmental humidity - decrease of humidity will decrease the drying duration
- Wind velocity - Sometimes people put a fan near the clothes when drying them indoors
- Direct sun - usually only the external line will be exposed to direct sun, so usually people put the thickest clothes on the most external line.
- Cloth thickness

== Drying laundry in freezing conditions ==
Laundry may be dried outdoors when the temperature is well below the freezing point. First, the moisture in the laundry items will freeze and the clothing will become stiff. Then the frost on the clothes will sublimate into the air, leaving the items dry. It takes a long time and it is usually much quicker to dry them indoors, but indoor drying transfers heat from the air to water vapor, so it is a trade-off between speed and energy efficiency. The added humidity cancels out the reduction in air temperature to some extent.

== North American trends, bans, and legislation ==
Hang drying is more common in Europe than in the United States: 80% of US households have a clothes dryer, while the proportion in Europe is closer to 30%. Dryers spread in popularity in the United States in the 1960s and still were in a minority of households in 1980, before reaching their 21st-century popularity. Correspondingly, clotheslines began to be seen by some as a mark of poverty.

In the US in the late 2000s to mid 2010s, many landlords and homeowner associations had implemented bans on clotheslines on the grounds that drying laundry outside lowered property values. This prompted many state governments to pass "right-to-dry" laws allowing their use. In 2009, "the majority of the 60 million people who now live in the [United States'] roughly 300,000 private communities" were forbidden from using outdoor clothes lines.

As of July 2025, the states of Florida, Colorado, Hawaii, Arizona, California, Illinois, Indiana, Louisiana, Maine, Maryland, Massachusetts, Nevada, New Mexico, North Carolina, Oregon, Texas, Vermont, Virginia, and Wisconsin had passed laws forbidding bans on clothes lines, while Utah allows local jurisdictions to forbid such bans. At least eight states restrict homeowners' associations from forbidding the installation of solar-energy systems, and lawyers have debated whether or not those laws might apply to clothes lines. British filmmaker, Steven Lake, released a documentary in 2011 titled Drying for Freedom about the clothes-line controversy in the United States. The right-to-dry movement saw little state-level change going into the 2020s, as laundry-drying trends remained seemingly complacent despite legislative changes.

In Canada, the province of Nova Scotia's first NDP government passed An Act to Prevent Prohibitions on the Use of Clotheslines on December 10, 2010 to allow all homeowners in the province to use clotheslines, regardless of restrictive covenants. The province of Ontario lifted bans on clothes lines in 2008. Some affluent Canadian suburban municipalities such as Hampstead, Québec, or Outremont, Québec, prohibit clotheslines.

== Gallery ==
'The Clothesline' by William de Leftwich Dodge

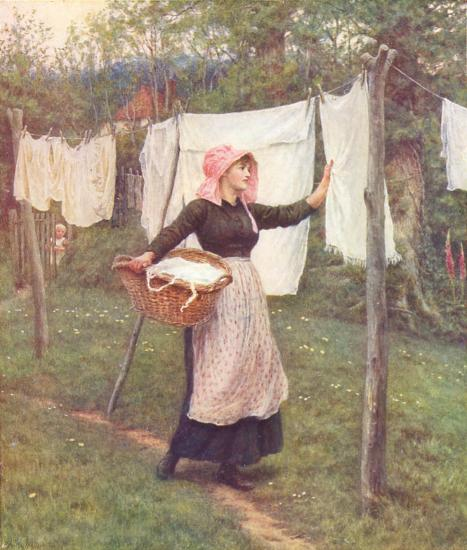

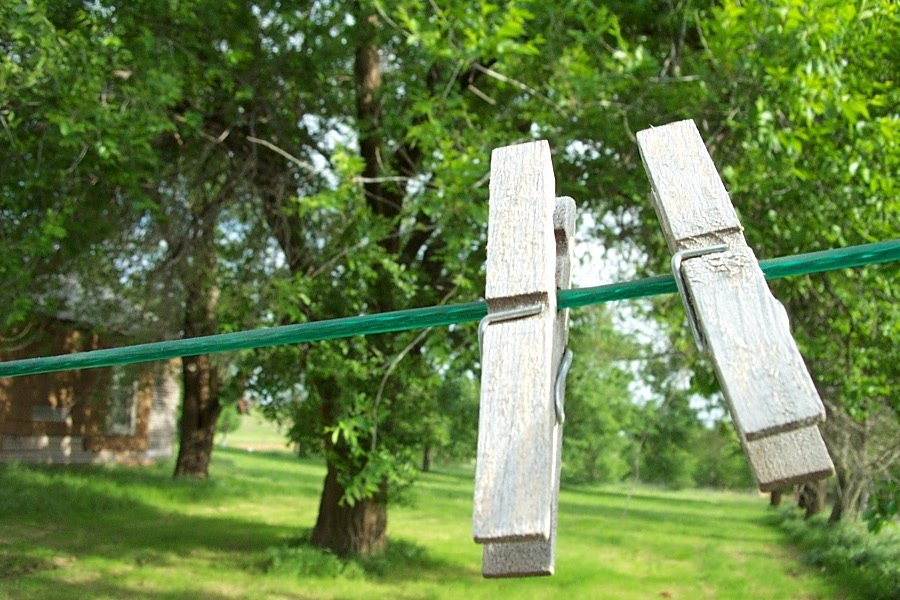
Clothes pins (or pegs) on a clothes line

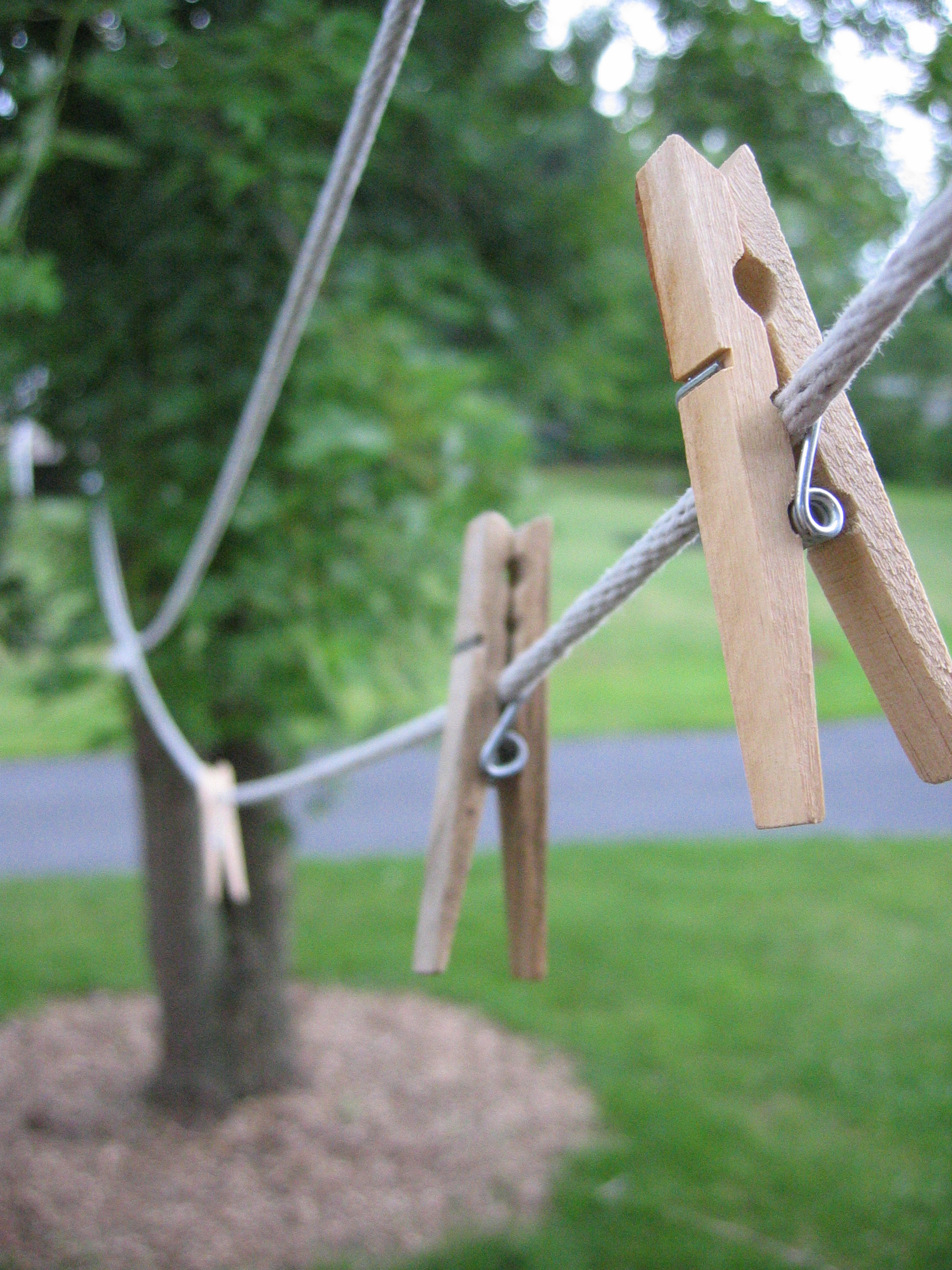
Pegs on a clothes line

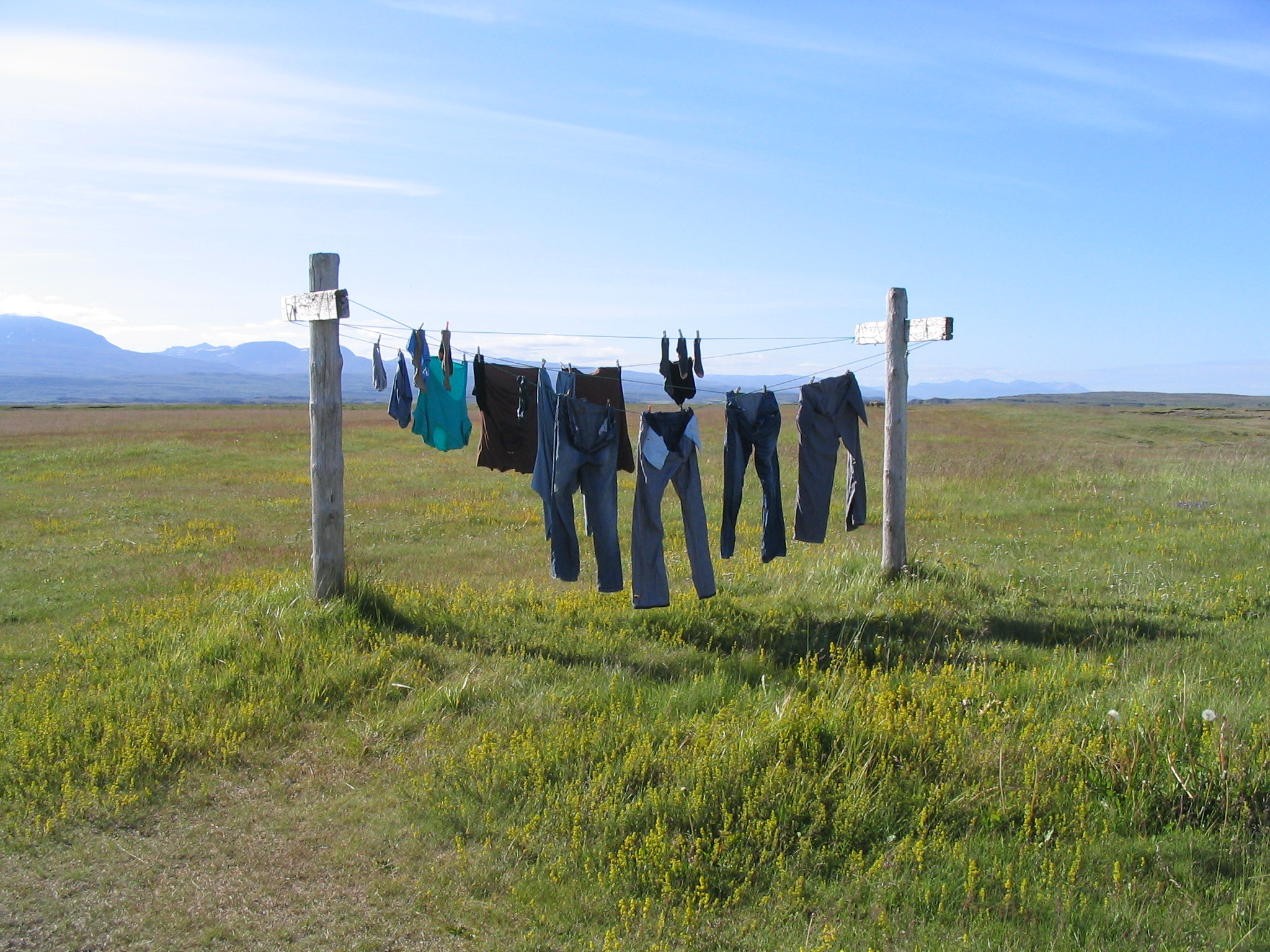
Washing line in Iceland

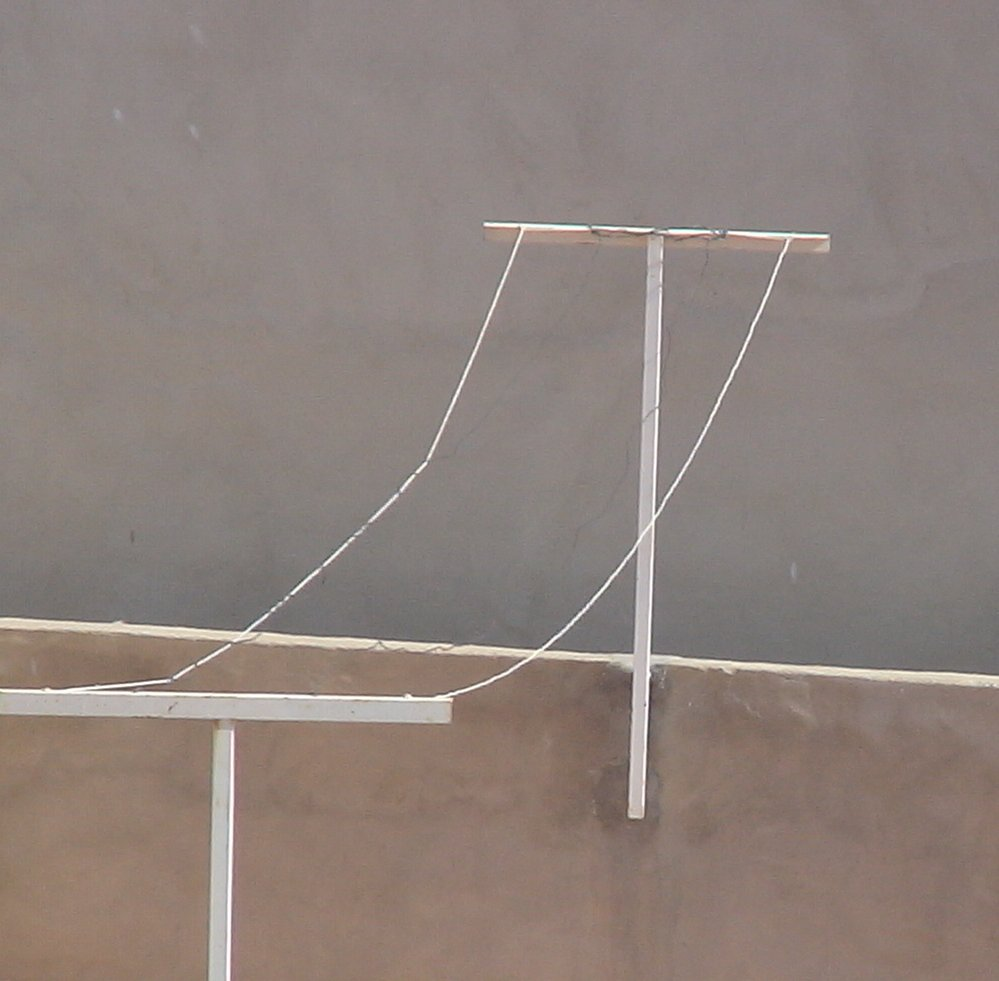
T clothes line

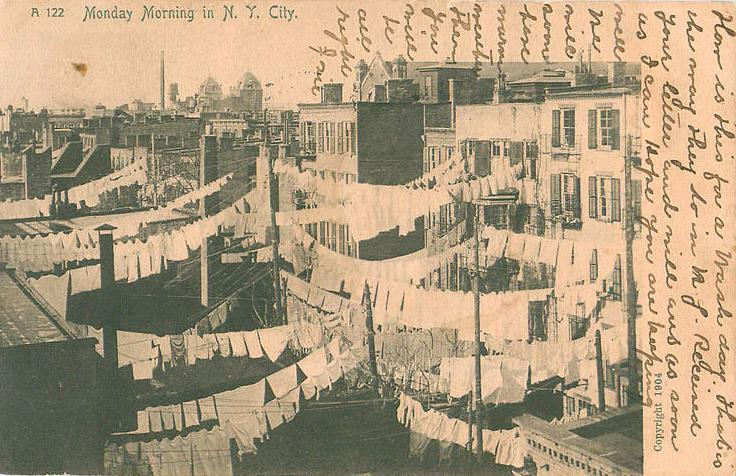
Clothes lines in New York City, from a 1904 postcard

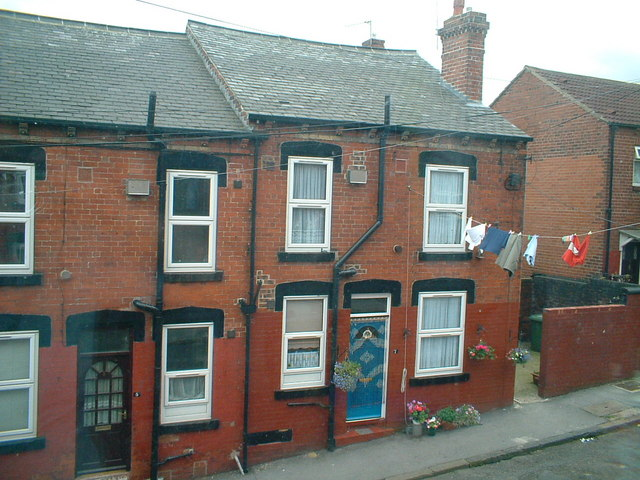
Across-street line in Armley, Leeds, showing pulley operated at street level, July 2004.

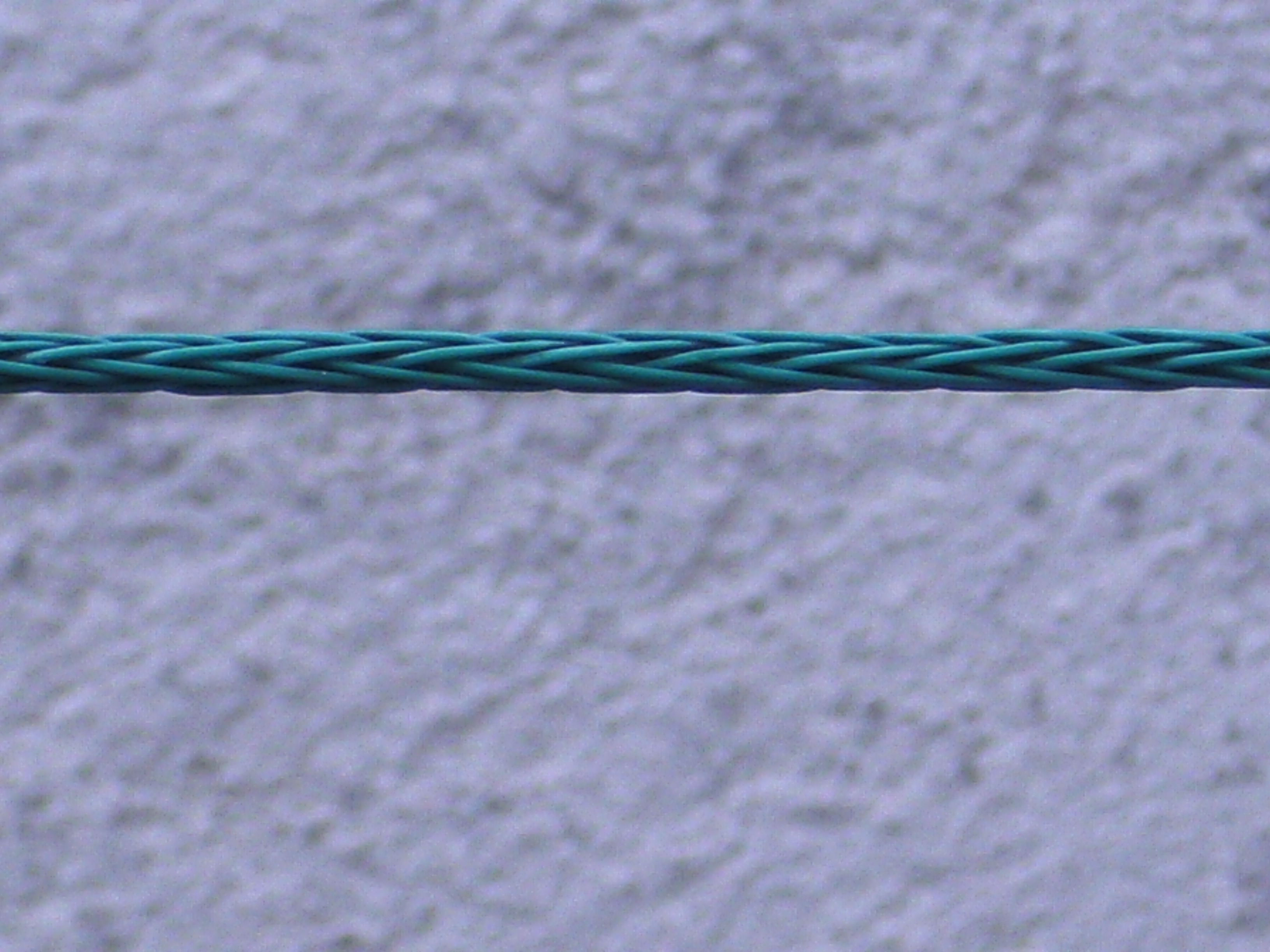
Clotheslines fiber made with polyurethane

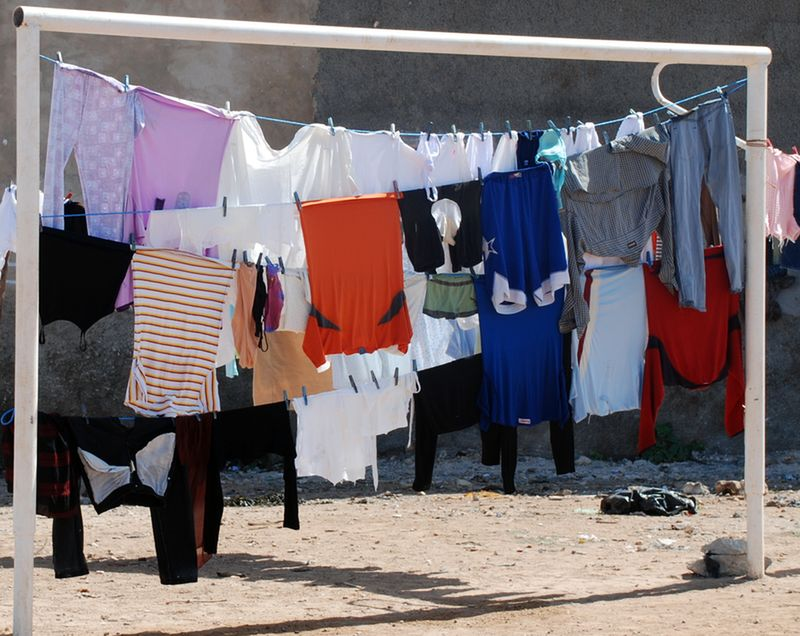
Clothesline in El Jadida

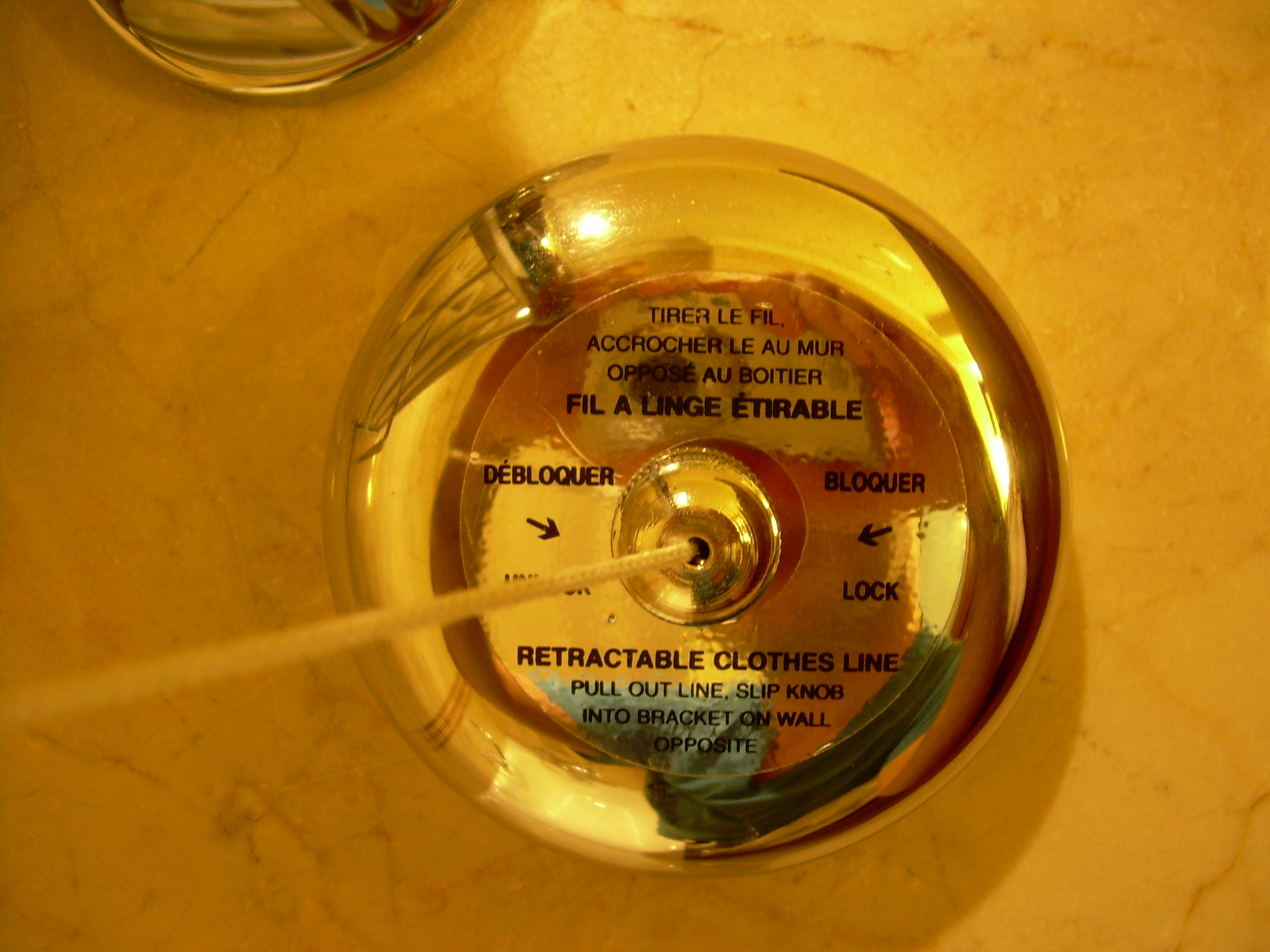
Retractable clothes line

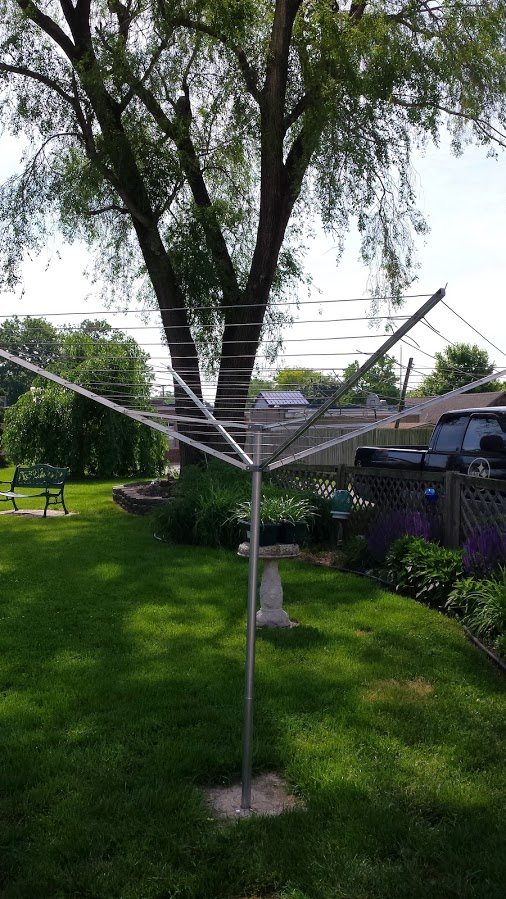
A folding umbrella-style clothes line

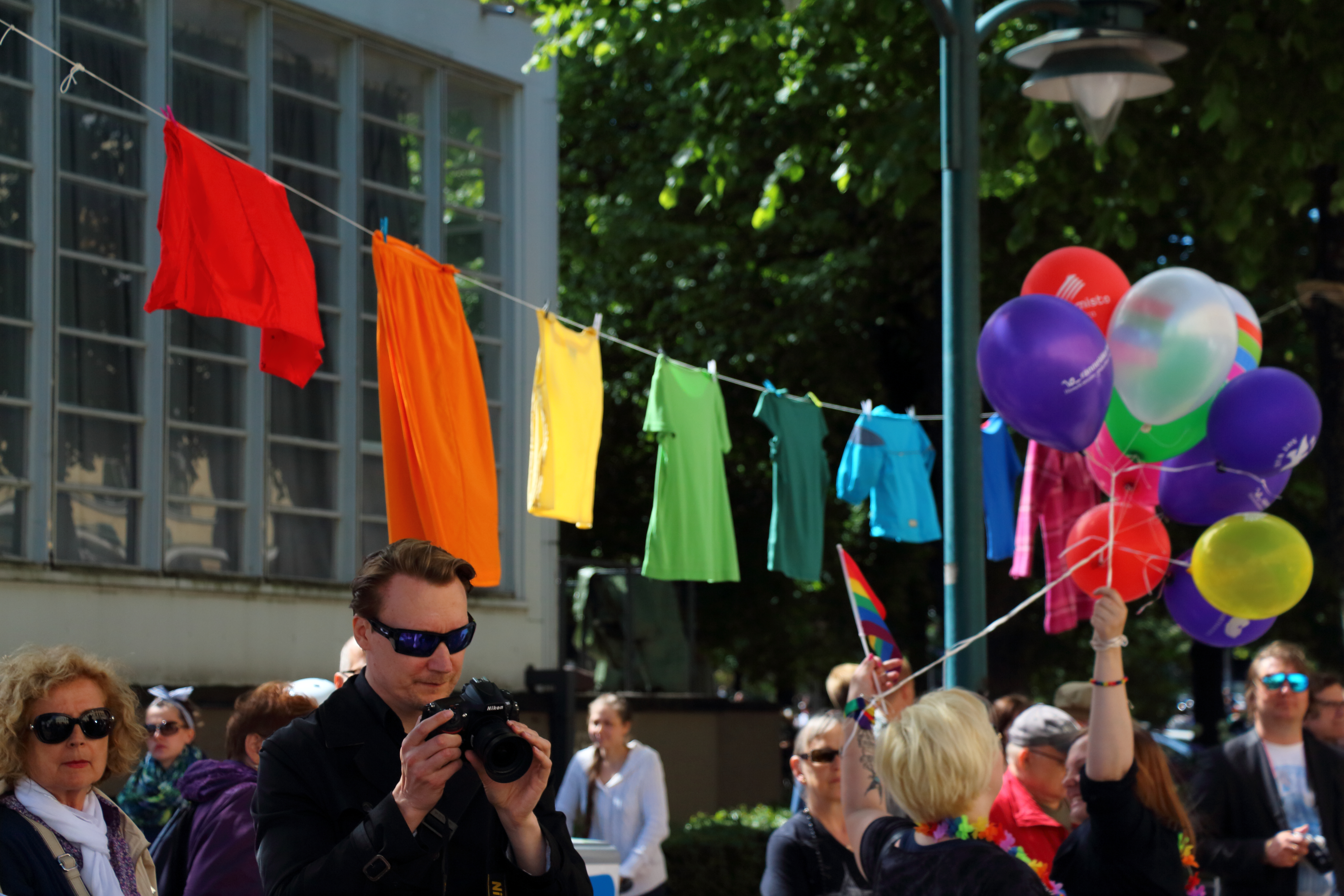
A clothes line as part of the art project Washing Lines in the Colors of the Rainbow

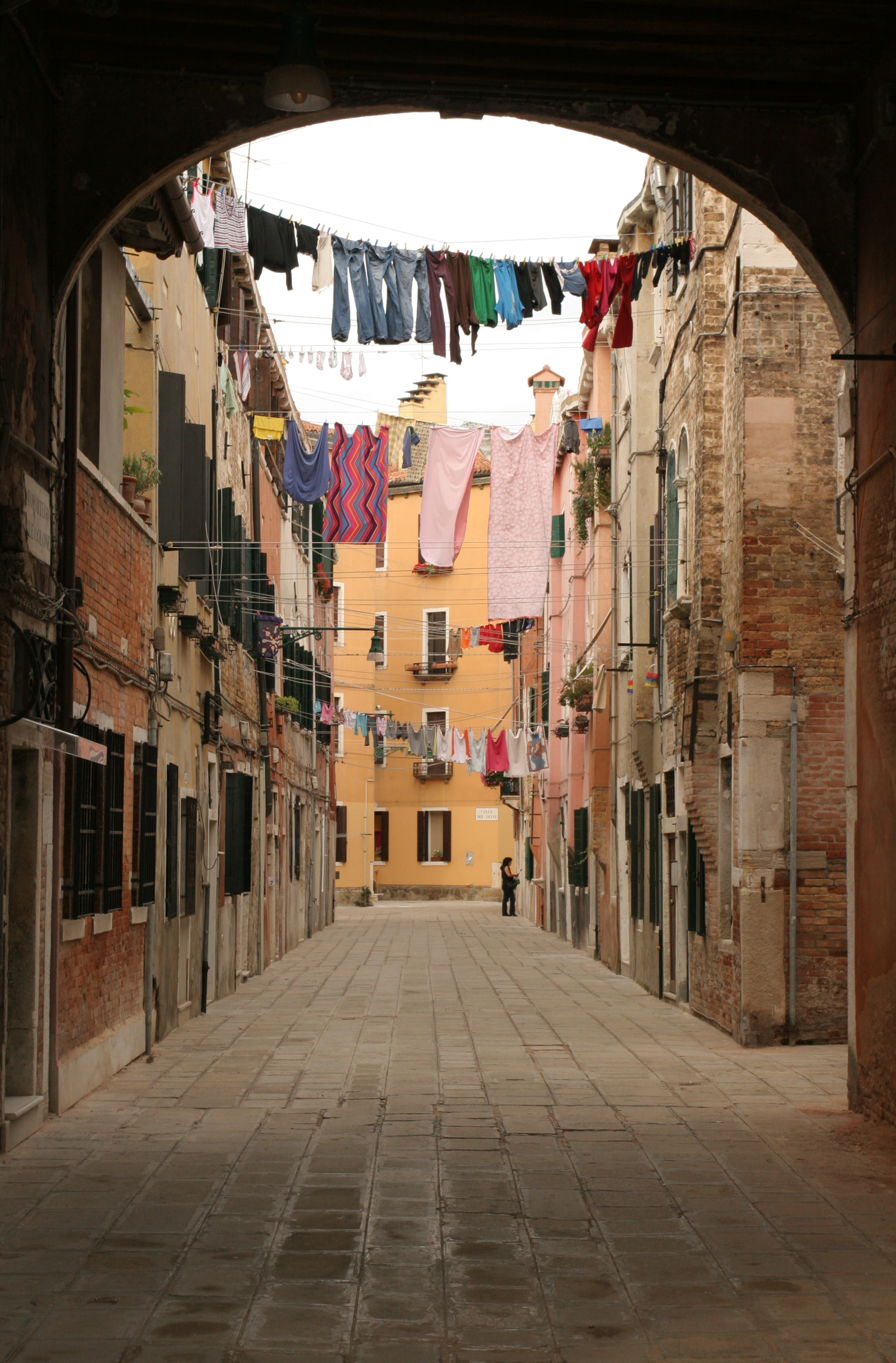
Venice, Italy

== See also ==
- Airing
- Clothes horse
- Drying cabinet
- Enthalpy of vaporization
- Hills Hoist
- Overhead clothes airer
- Penman equation
