= Clothes valet =

Furniture to hang clothes on

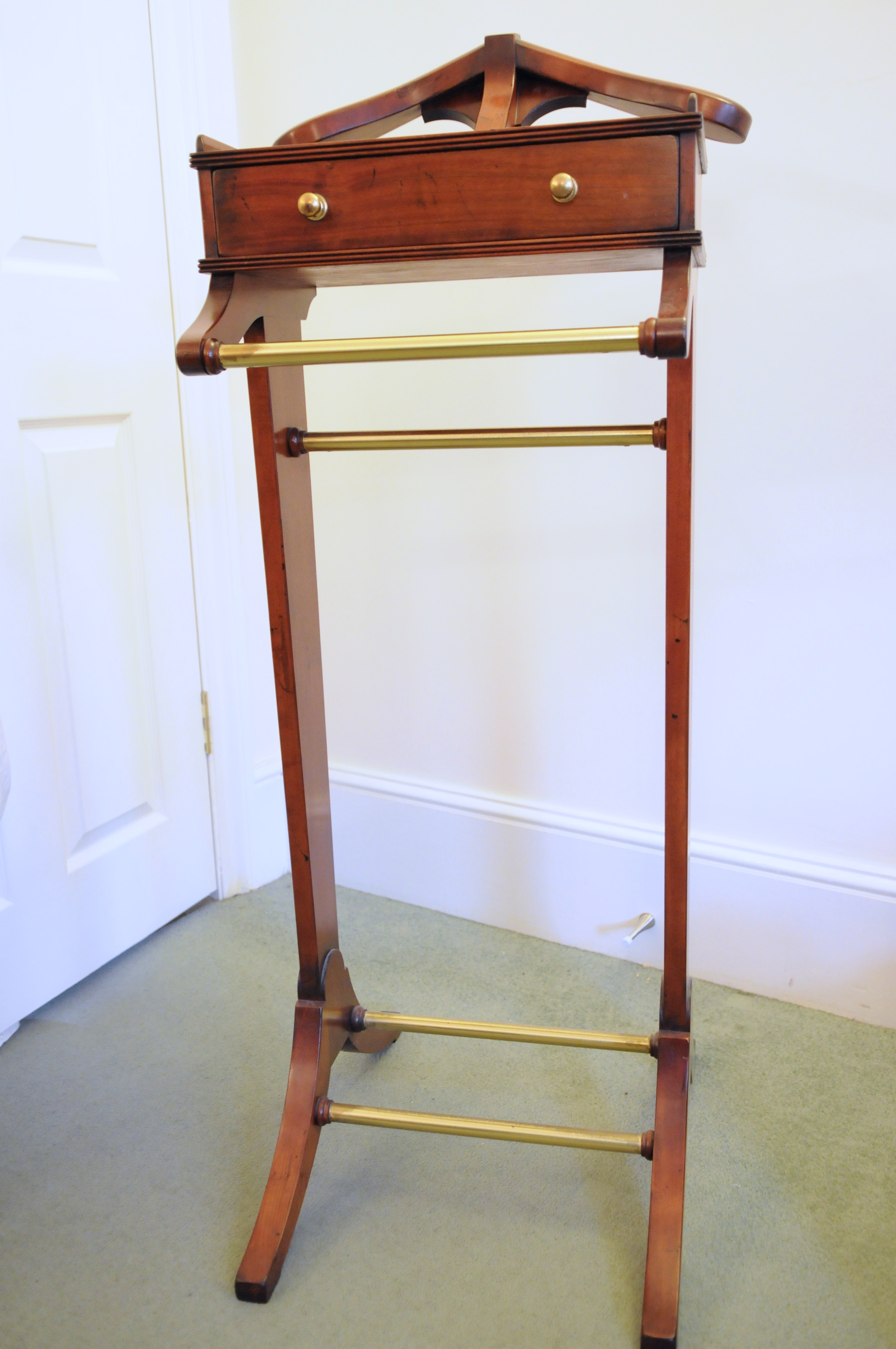
Gentleman's oak valet

Clothes valet, also called men's valet, valet stand, clothes butler or a suit stand, is a piece of furniture to hang clothes on. It was developed for middle class gentlemen, who could not afford to hire a valet. They are used especially when tired coming home from work, and one does not want to create a mess by hanging clothes on furniture.

Clothes are hung that are worn multiple times before laundering, such as a men's suit. Typical features of valets include trouser hangers, jacket hangers, shoe bars, and a tray organizer for miscellaneous, day-to-day objects like wallets and keys. Some also feature jewelry boxes.

== Variants ==
An electric clothes valet is used to warm clothes before dressing; it includes a timer to prevent overheating.

Floor-standing clothes steamers can also have a fixed clothes hanger so that they can function as a combined clothes steamer and men's valet.

A valet rod is a pipe shaped clothes valet which protrudes from a cabinet or similar, and is used as a compact clothes valet.

== Gallery ==
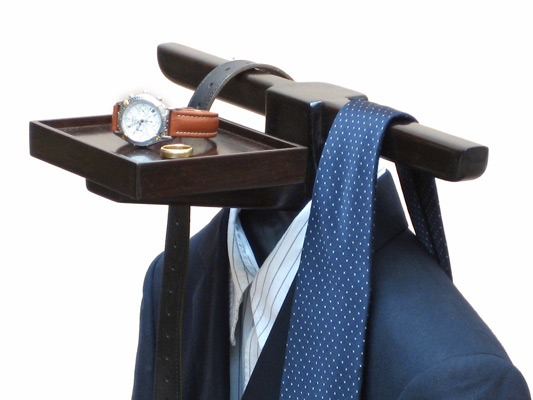
A suit with accessories on a valet stand.

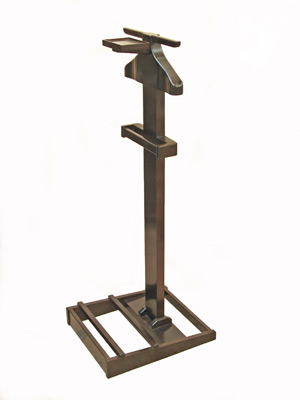
Empty valet stand.

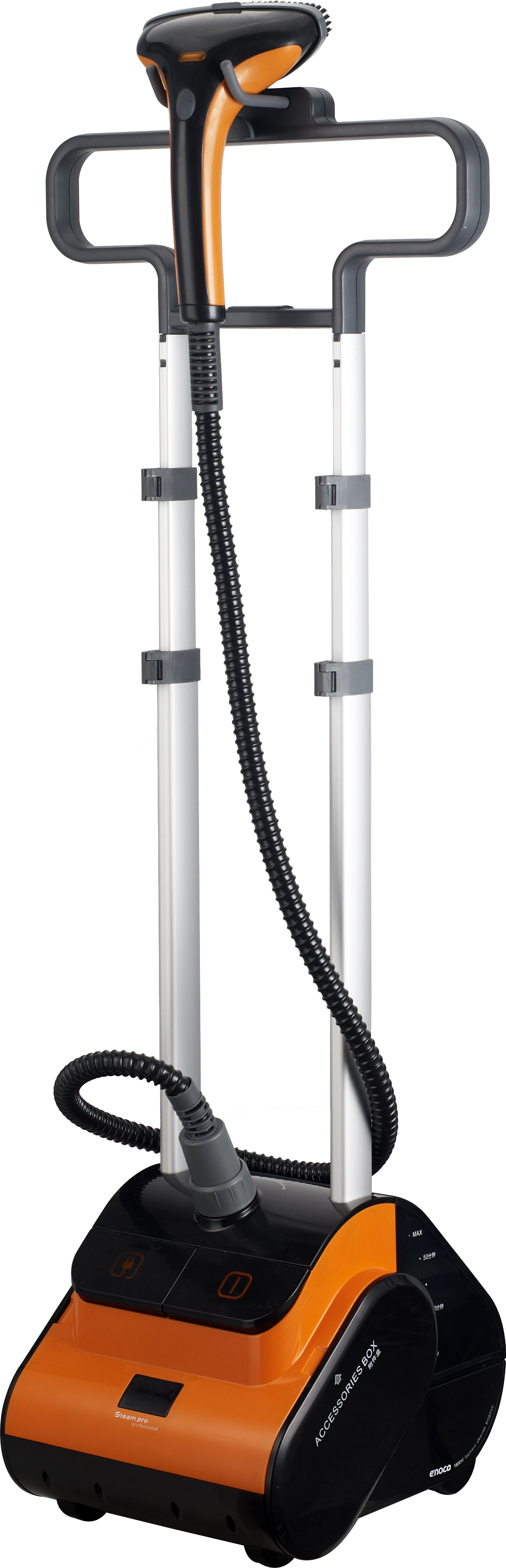
Clothes steamer with an integrated clothes valet

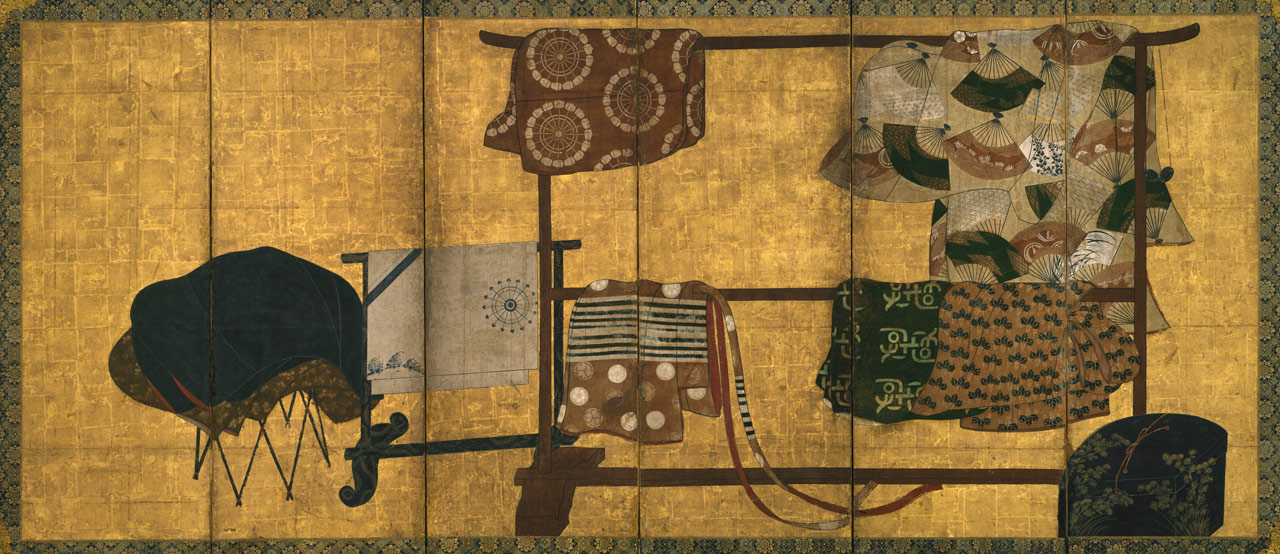
Ka (架, lit. "rack"), a Japanese rack for clothing. Art from the Momoyama period (1573–1615).

== See also ==
- Clothes hanger
- Clotheshorse
- Clothes steamer
- Coat rack
- Dress code
