= Laurastar =

Swiss steam-ironing systems manufacturer

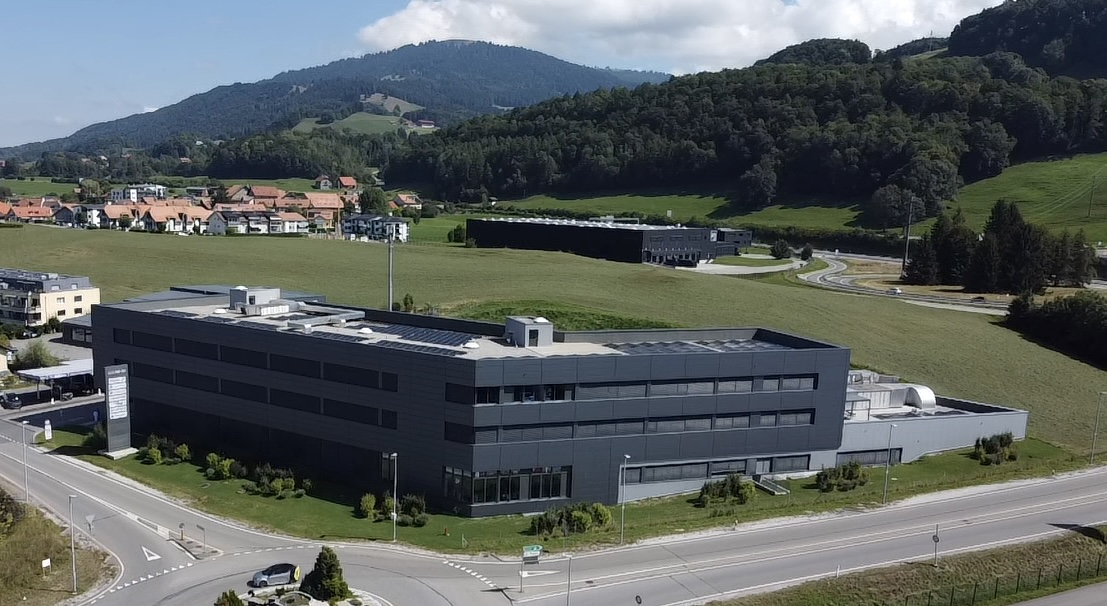
- Laurastar's headquarters in Châtel-Saint-Denis (Switzerland)
- Type: S.A.
- Industry: home appliance
- Founded: 1980
- Founder: Jean Monney
- Headquarters: Châtel-Saint-Denis, Switzerland
- Key people: Julie Monney, Michaël Monney
- Products: clothes irons and steamers
- Number of employees: 290 (2026)
- Website: www.laurastar.com

Laurastar is a Swiss company, founded in 1980 by Jean Monney and located in Châtel-Saint-Denis. It describes itself as specializing in ironing systems. The company has specialised in ironing-related products since the 1980s. In 2019, Julie and Michaël Monney, the founder's children, took over the company. The company employs around 290 people.

== History ==
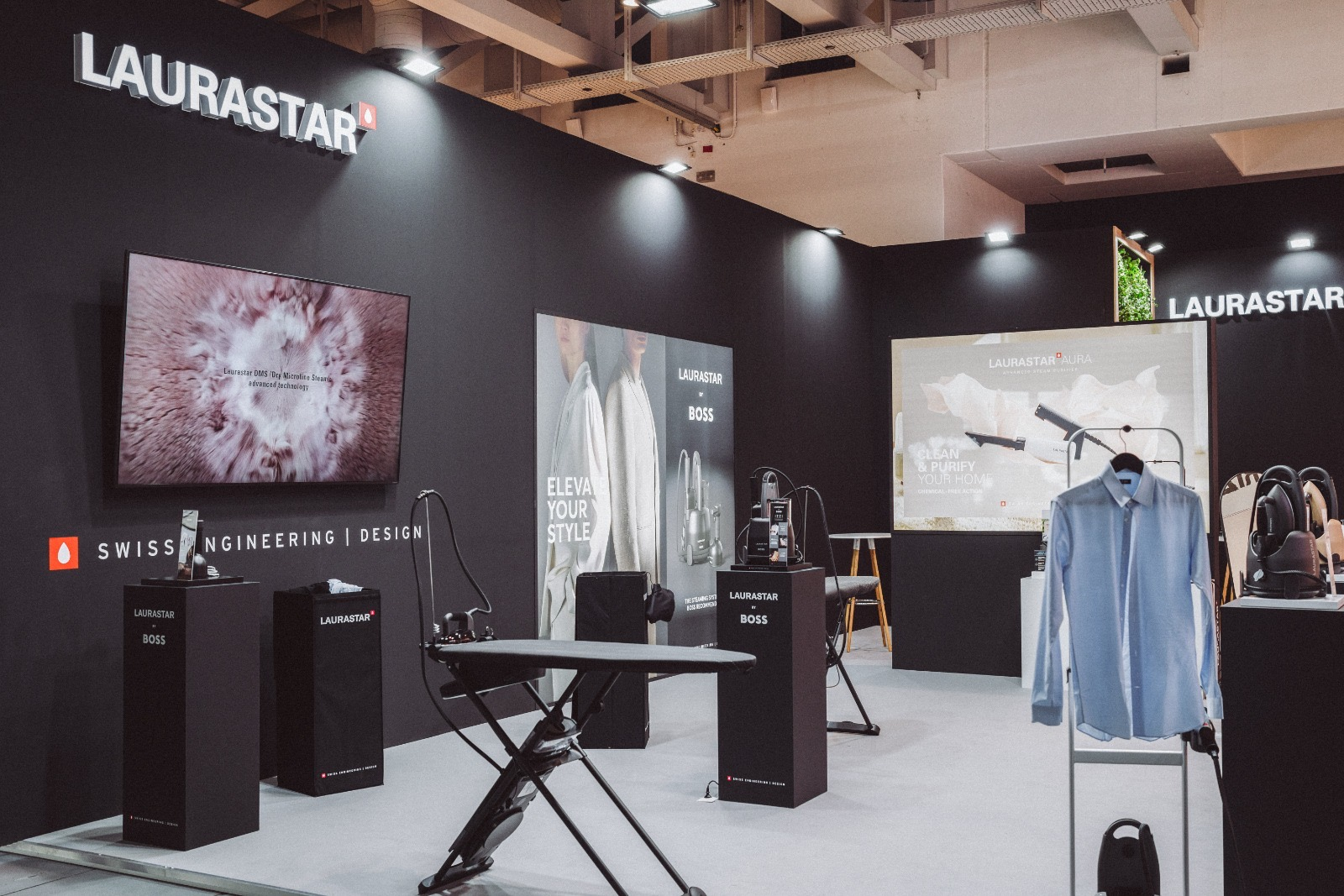
Laurastar booth at IFA Berlin in 2025.

The Laurastar company was founded in 1980. A few years later, it began making ironing equipment after the meeting of its founder Jean Monney with an Italian inventor who had developed a vapor pressure iron. In 1993, the company relocated to Châtel-Saint-Denis. It was later renamed Laurastar, in tribute to Italian designer Laura Biagiotti, a former collaborator of Jean Monney.

Julie and Michaël Monney, children of the founder, joined the company in 2010, the former as marketing director, the latter as sales director. In recent years, the company has introduced products with more digitalised features

In 2017 that the company focused its products on the potential benefits of steam for public health. It developed a disinfectant steam technology to combat infectious agents such as bacteria or viruses. In 2019, Jean Monney stepped down from the operational management of Laurastar, after forty years of activity. At that time, Laurastar claimed to have sold three million products in around forty countries and employed 225 employees. Michaël and Julie Monney became co-directors on this occasion. In 2023, Laurastar partnered with Swiss fashion designer Kevin Germanier to launch a capsule collection made from recycled materials.

== Organization ==
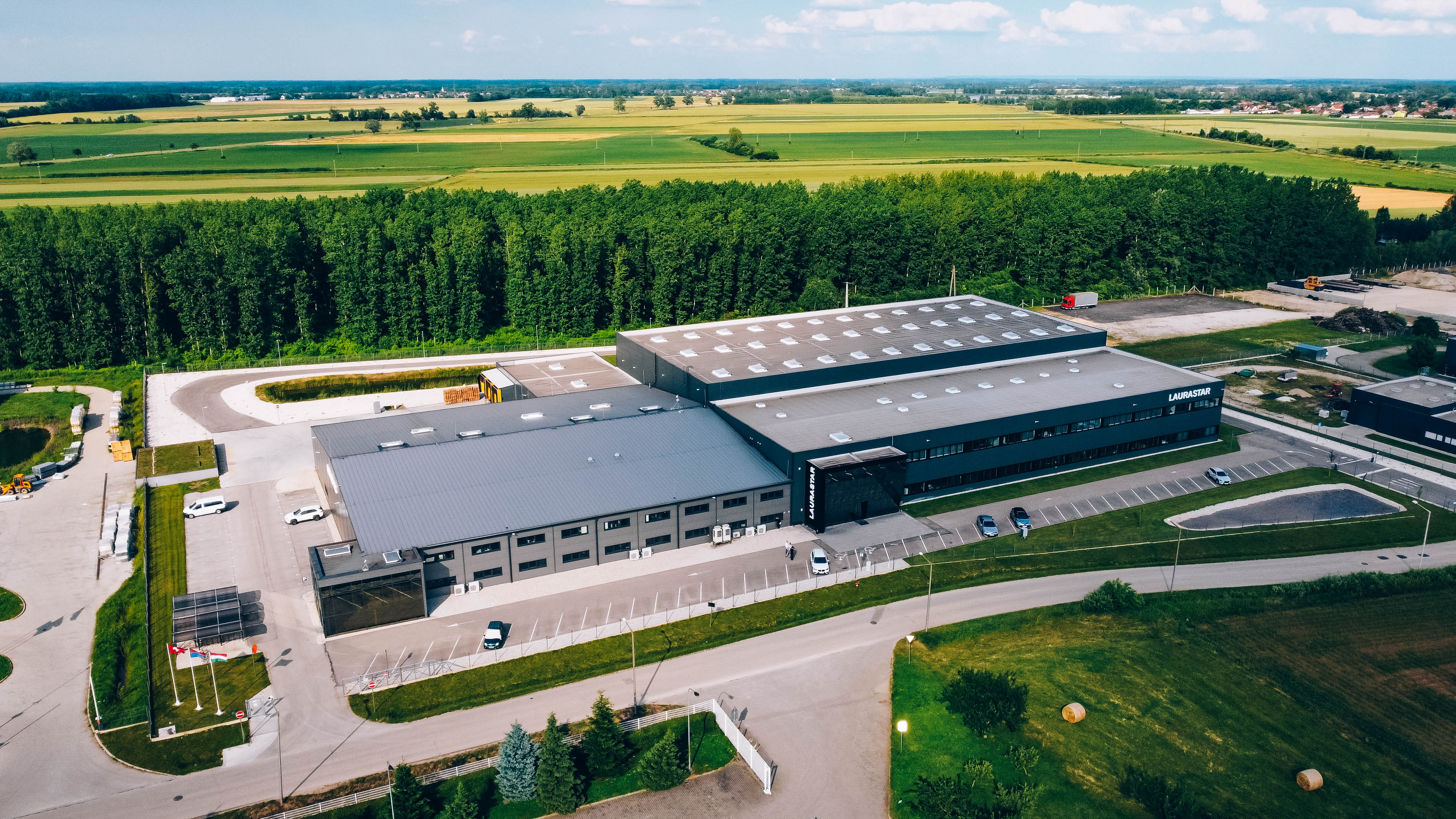
Laurastar factory in Kapuvár, Hungary

Laurastar's headquarters are located in Châtel-Saint-Denis, in the canton of Fribourg, but the company manufactures its pressurized steam systems in its factory in Hungary, previously a simple repair center that benefited from significant investment in 2019. The company has subsidiaries in Germany, France, Belgium, the Netherlands and Hungary.. Laurastar has received the Swiss Triple Impact certification from B Lab, a designation awarded to companies that meet specific social and environmental standards.
