= Shoe hanger =

Device used to hang footwear

A shoe hanger, also called a shoe display hanger, is commonly used to hang and display footwear in retail stores for the purpose of space efficient storage and to present footwear to customers. Shoe hangers have secondary functions of providing support for footwear and for displaying key information, such as style and shoe size. Shoe hangers come in a variety of styles for different display purposes and footwear types. The most common styles are wing, hook, and clip designs, which are made from plastic.

== Designs ==
Wing shoe hangers have an elongated base that terminates at the upper end with a hook. Usually, a flat disc appears just below the hook where information about the footwear is displayed. The bottom end of the base terminates into a U-shape. Each arm of the U acts as an element where a shoe can be fitted. These arms often extend and loop back down on each other to create a wing, which offers more support for the shoe. In U-shaped and wing designs, each shoe of the pair is hung adjacent to each other. This design is most commonly used for flat soled footwear such as trainers, sandals, slippers, and pumps.

Hook shoe hangers are more basic in their design and resemble small clothes hangers. The arms are far shorter and have a hook at their end. This design is commonly used to hang flip-flops or sandals.

Clip shoe hangers are used to hand and display boots. The base is short and terminates at the upper end with a hook. Directly below the hook is a flat disc that acts as a display for information and also as a grip to open the spring clip. The clip displays boots side on as opposed to other shoe hanger designs that display footwear front on.

== History ==
One of the earliest patented shoe hangers was used for the purpose of hanging shoes in public service areas such as school, where it was important to be able to store shoes in an organised manner. It was also important to prominently display shoes so that the wearer would have easy access to them. Like modern shoe hangers in retail stores, its secondary function was to support shoes. The main difference between this design and modern shoe hangers was that the soles of the shoes would lie flat against the wall. This early shoe hanger, which was made from wire, was patented in 1926 by Jesse S. Harding.

As retail space became increasingly expensive it became necessary to display shoes and other clothing items in a more space efficient way. The first modern shoe hanger was filed by the Japanese Tsuneji Matsubara in 1970 and consisted of a base with an element for placing a pair of shoes adjacent to each other. Various improvements were made over the next few decades to accommodate the storage and display of different types of shoes, as seen in the wing, hook, and clip designs.

== See also ==
- Clothes hanger
- Shoe rack
