= Tunnel finisher =

Machine that removes wrinkles from garments

A tunnel finisher is a machine that removes wrinkles from garments and is often used in the textile industry. As with other industrial pressing equipment, this machine is employed to improve the quality and look of a textile product. It has a chamber called a "tunnel" and includes a conveyor fed unit through which the garments are steamed and dried. The machine also features hook systems; air curtain entrance to eliminate moisture or condensation; cotton care and roller units; exhaust steam, and a preconditioning module.

== Process ==
Most garments are shipped by sea freight from the country of production. They get very wrinkled because of the box packing being used. In the receiving country, they are unpacked and put on a clothes hanger. Those hangers are sent via automated transport through the tunnel with a speed up to 3,000 garments per hour. These garments are then sent to a room to be steamed and dried.

The machine processes each garment through several stages. First, the garment passes through a steam chamber to make the fabric moldable. Then wrinkles are removed by a strong hot air flow alongside the garments. Finally, the garment is dried by cooler air before it leaves the tunnel finisher. In the case of garments, smaller areas such as collars require further pressing using other equipment such as steam iron for a better finish.

The tunnel finisher is also used in laundries and dry cleaners to remove wrinkles from garments after washing or dry cleaning.

== Classifications ==
Tunnel finishers can be grouped into two different classifications, "wide body" or "narrow body." "Wide body" machines are designed for high production finishing of blended garments wet-to-dry, damp-to-dry and or dry-to-dry. "Narrow body" machines are designed for shoulder-to-shoulder processing and are best suited for the dry-to-dry finishing of garments. However; they are capable of damp-to-dry finishing at slower production speeds. These units are ideal for dry cleaners, hotel laundries, institutional laundries and other on-premises laundry applications. The smaller capacity version of the tunnel finisher is called "cabinet tunnel" and this typically capable of automated processing of separate batches of 4 or 5 garments at the same time. The production capacity for this smaller equipment is 10 percent of the tunnel finisher.
