= Shoe rack =

Furniture for holding shoes

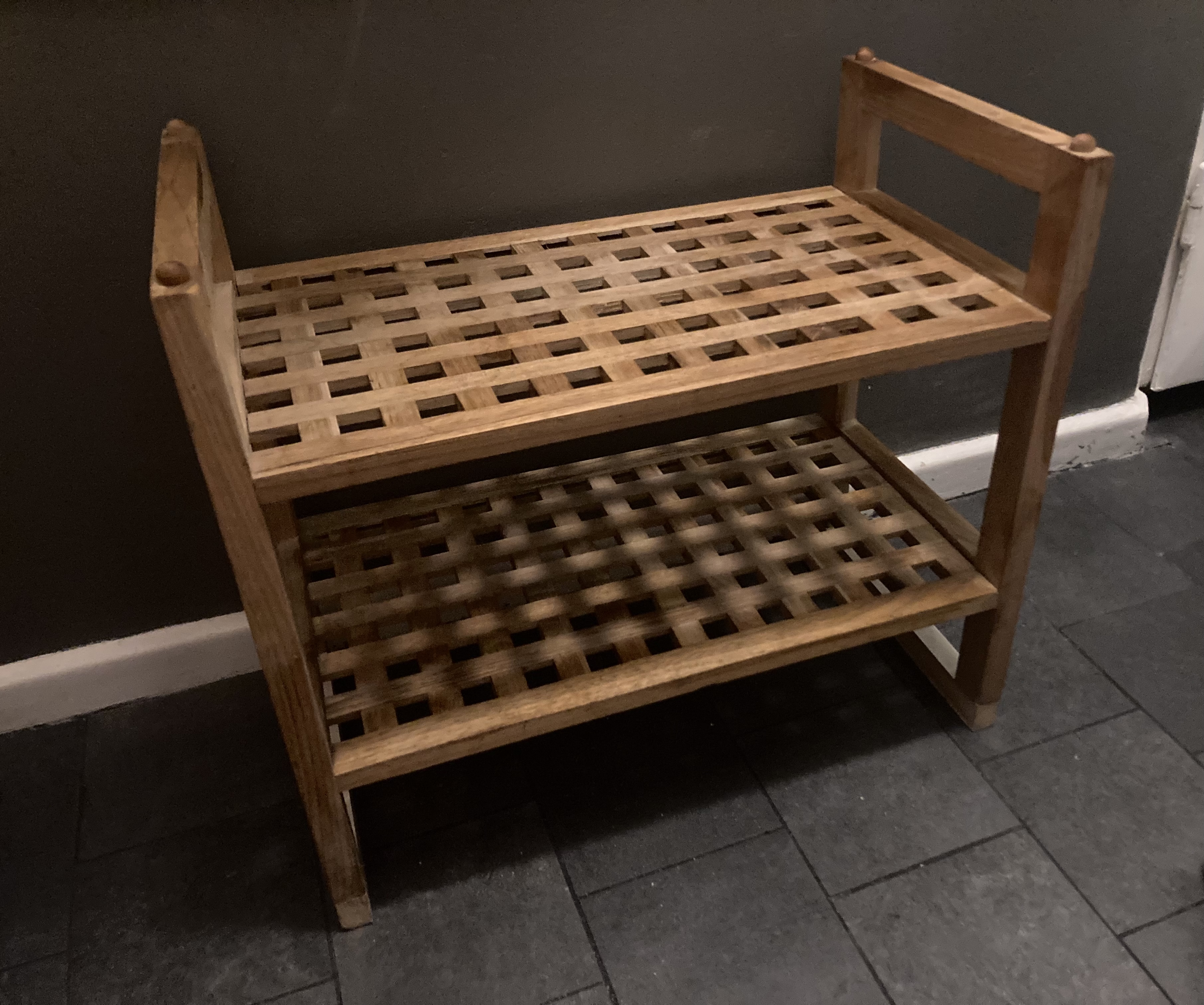
A simple shoe rack with room for four pairs of shoes.

A shoe rack is a piece of furniture which is often found by the door mat in the entryway of houses, and serves to keep shoes organized. Often it is placed near a hat shelf, wardrobe rail, or coat rack where clothes for outdoor use can be hung. Some shoe racks also serve as benches where people can sit while putting their shoes on.

== See also ==
- Shoe hanger
