= Collecticus =

UK magazine

- Collecticus issue 102 cover (February 2011)
- Editor: Collecticus
- Categories: Collecting
- Frequency: Monthly
- First issue: September 2004
- Company: Wentrow Media
- Country: United Kingdom
- Language: English
- Website: collecticus.co.uk
- ISSN: 1746-4420

Collecticus is a monthly magazine, focusing on the subject of affordable collectable items. The magazine is published by Wentrow Media in the United Kingdom. It is currently printed by Hartley Publications.

== History and profile ==
Collecticus was first published in September 2004 as a monthly 36-page A5 magazine. The style changed significantly throughout the first few issues and Collecticus proved very popular with collectors. In April 2006, it was decided that the magazine should become fortnightly.

The magazine received a complete makeover in issue 24 (31 May 2006), but remained as a fortnightly A5 publication, printed by Hartley Publications.

In issue 44 (June 2007), the magazine once again became monthly, but now printed as an 84-page A4 magazine by Acorn Web Offset. The A4 magazine featured a wide variety of feature articles on subjects including football programmes, James Bond, Beanie Babies, Star Wars, Observer's Books, Butlins, Royalty, Noddy, First Day Covers, and many more. The A4 magazine also included news, competitions, and a crossword.

In December 2007, it was announced that, from January 2008, Collecticus would be returning to its original A5 format (printed by Hartley Publications), but would now be published weekly to "take subscribers on a trip down memory lane each and every week."

Due to popular demand, the magazine returned to its monthly frequency in July 2008, and Collecticus announced plans for an 84-page A5 magazine soon.

For issue 90 (December 2009), the magazine reverted to an A4 format, this time with 64 pages and including a section called Colum in which subscribers could sell their own items. This section became a pull-out section in issue 97. In February 2010, Collecticus also launched a companion auction website, making it possible to list items for sale online as well as in the magazine.

In November 2010 Collecticus celebrated its 100th issue.

A wide variety of collector's items (selected from over 200 collecting categories) are featured in every issue (including full-colour photographs) and most are offered for sale through the dedicated auction website.

== Current Features ==
- Hundreds of collectable items – all items featured are put up for sale via a dedicated auction website (bids are also accepted by post).
- Specialist auctions – regular auctions for specialist areas such as velology, railwayana, etc.
- Making Money from Collectables – monthly articles highlighting certain collectable subjects and giving advice on how to specialise in those areas.
- Watching Values – an in-depth analysis of the prices achieved in the latest Collecticus auction, to help spot the latest trends in the world of collecting.
- Subscriber Benefits – access to a special subscriber website containing a collectables search engine, a car boot sale list, and an ephemera year finder.
- Advertising from the Past – a range of advertisements from days gone by.
- Colum (Collecticus Emporium) – a pull-out section through which collectors can sell their own collectable items.

== Collecticus Emporium ==
Collecticus Emporium is a facility that enabled all subscribers to enter their own collectable items into a magazine. The items were then auctioned on behalf of the subscribers. Initially, Collecticus Emporium was a separate monthly magazine sent free of charge to all Collecticus subscribers (first issue dated August 2005). However, in issue 21 (April 2007), it was announced that Collecticus Emporium would begin to be printed inside Collecticus.

In December 2007, it was announced that, following Collecticus becoming a weekly magazine, there would be one last issue of Collecticus Emporium as a standalone magazine and then the service would be stopped for the foreseeable future.

Due to popular demand, it was announced in issue 68 that the service would be returning in June 2008.

Colum (Collecticus Emporium) was featured inside Collecticus from issue 90 (December 2009) and became a 16-page pull-out section in issue 97 (August 2010). Items featured in Colum also appear on the Collecticus auction website.

== Trade And Collect Books ==
Collecticus has published four individual books focusing on specific collecting areas. Titles so far are: Tax Discs, Ephemera, First Day Covers, and TV & Radio Licences. More titles are set to follow.

Collecticus has also published a more general book called Trade And Collect Collectables.
