= Clothes hanger =

Device used to hang garments

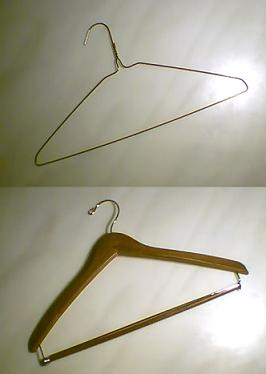
Wire (top) and wooden (bottom) clothes hangers

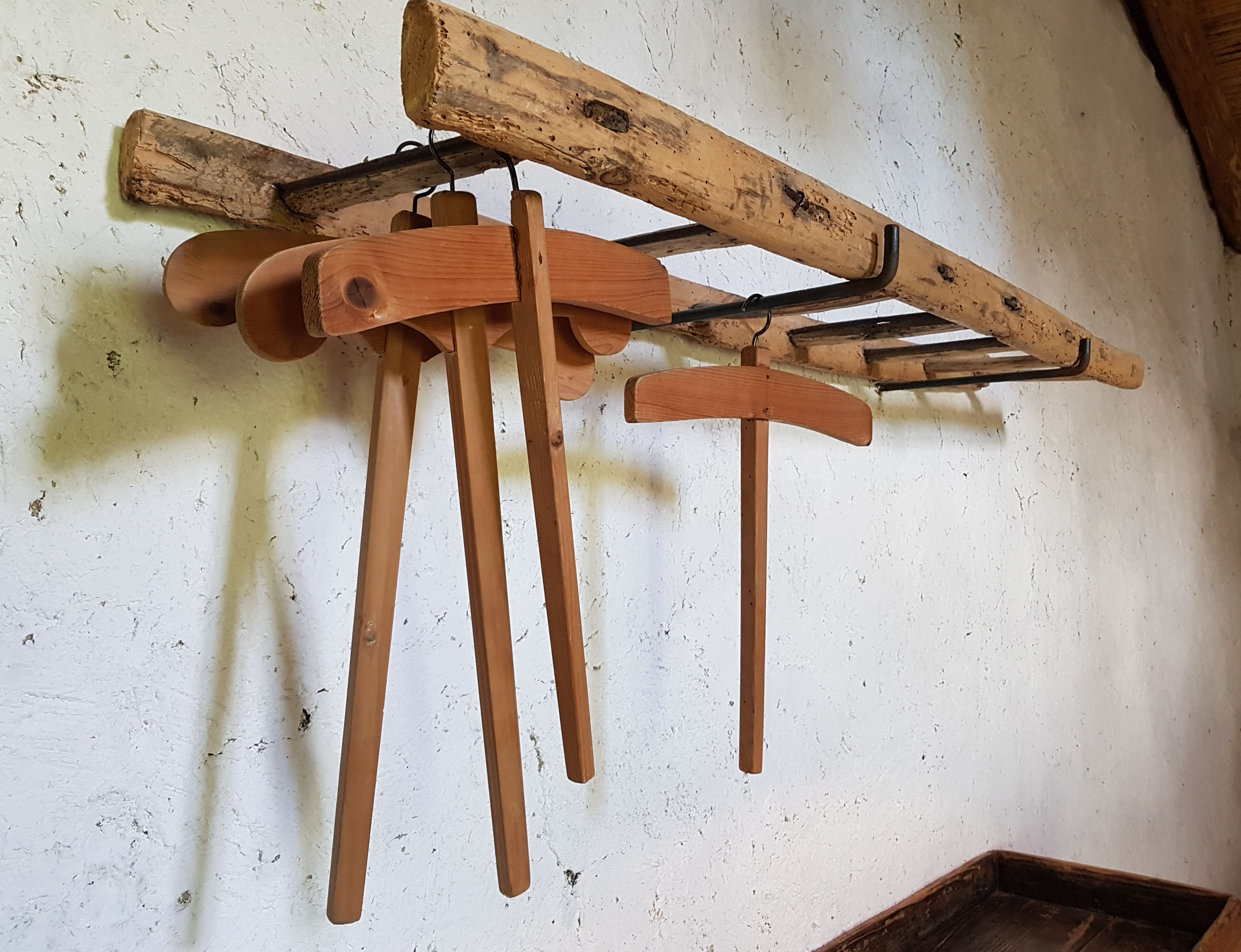
Wooden clothes hangers in Sardinia

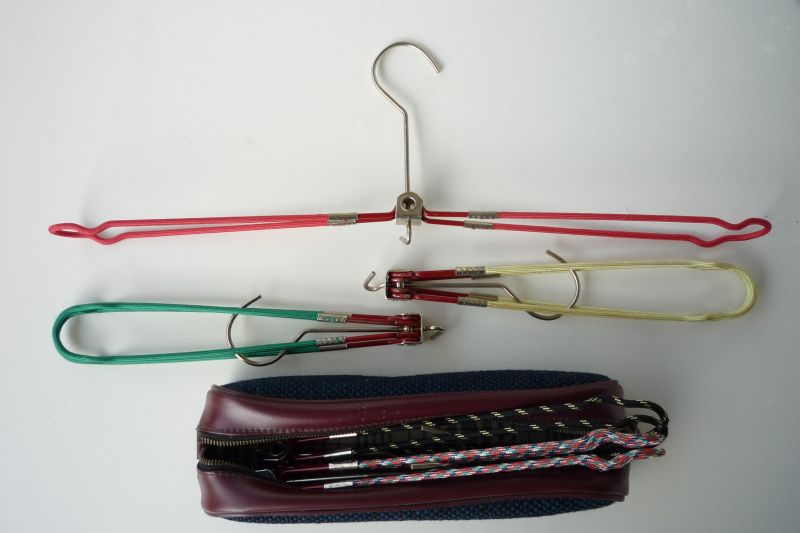
Foldable clothes hangers with sheath c. 1960

A clothes hanger, coat hanger, or coathanger, shirt hanger, jacket hanger, or simply a hanger, is a hanging device in the shape/contour of:

- Human shoulders designed to facilitate the hanging of a coat, jacket, sweater, shirt, blouse or dress in a manner that prevents wrinkles, with a lower bar for the hanging of trousers or skirts.
- Clamp for the hanging of trousers, skirts, or kilts. Both types can be combined in a single hanger.

The clothing hanger was originally designed to allow people quick access to their clothing as well as designate an area, in their home, to keep their clothing in. It was also used to keep clothing dry or without a wrinkle.

There are three basic types of clothes hangers. The first is the wire hanger, which has a simple loop of wire, most often steel, in a flattened triangle shape that continues into a hook at the top. The second is the wooden hanger, which consists of a flat piece of wood cut into a boomerang-like shape with the edges sanded down to prevent damage to the clothing, and a hook, usually of metal, protruding from the point. Some wooden hangers have a rounded bar from tip to tip, forming a flattened triangle. This bar is designed to hang the trousers belonging to the jacket. The third kind and most used in today's world are plastic coat hangers, which mostly mimic the shape of either a wire or a wooden hanger. Plastic coat hangers are also produced in smaller sizes to accommodate the shapes of children's clothes.

Some hangers have clips along the bottom for suspending skirts. Dedicated skirt and trousers hangers may not use the triangular shape at all, instead using just a rod with clips. Other hangers have little rings coming from the top two bars to hang straps from tank tops on. Specialized pant hanger racks may accommodate many pairs of trousers. Foldable clothes hangers that are designed to be inserted through the collar area for ease of use and the reduction of stretching are an old, yet potentially useful variation on traditional clothes hangers. They have been patented over 200 times in the U.S. alone, as in U.S. Patent 0586456, awarded in 1897 to George E. Hideout.

== History ==
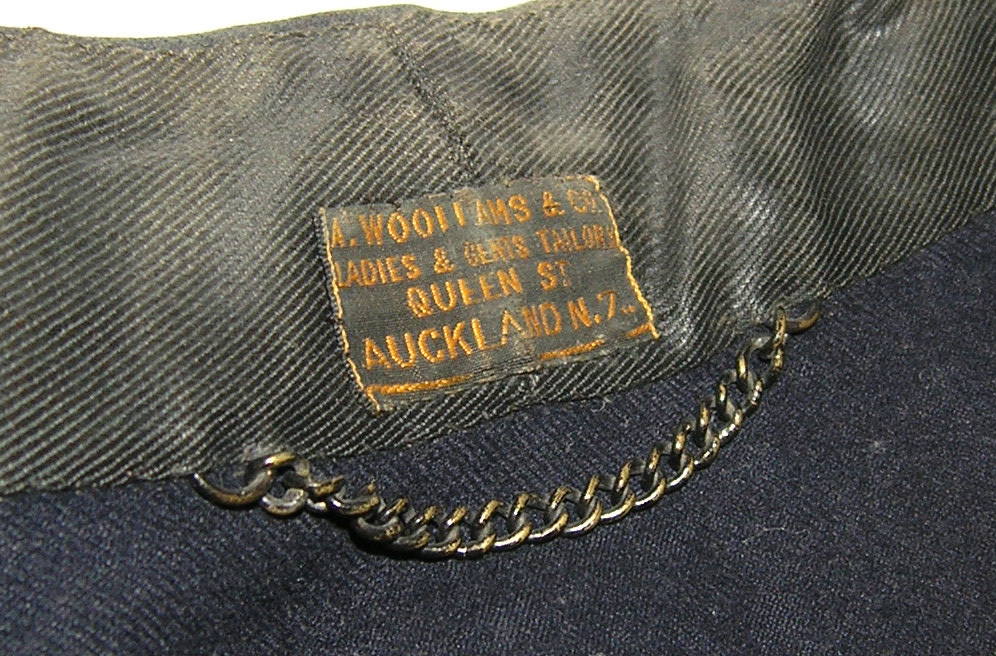
Chain coat-hanger detail. Jacket (military), wool, dated 1900. Auckland War Memorial Museum Tāmaki Paenga Hira: 739982 (object number).

Referred to as a coat-hanger, the small piece of fabric attached to the nape of the neck inside a coat or jacket was developed in 1830, enabling the hanging of such types of outer clothing. Around 1850, small chains were developed to be used in place of fabric loops, though the use of loops of fabric continued, and are still a feature present in many garments today.

US President Thomas Jefferson was known to have a device for hanging clothes in his closet at Monticello. However, today's most-used hanger, the shoulder-shaped wire hanger, was inspired by a coat hook that was invented in 1869 by O. A. North of New Britain, Connecticut. An employee of the Timberlake Wire and Novelty Company, Albert J. Parkhouse of Jackson, Michigan has also been credited with the invention. The story goes that one morning in 1903, Parkhouse arrived to work to find that all coat hooks were taken. Annoyed, he took a piece of wire, bent it into the shape we would recognize today, and hung his coat. Also credited is Christopher Cann in 1876 as an engineering student at Boston University.

In 1906 Meyer May, a men's clothier of Grand Rapids, Michigan, became the first retailer to display his wares on his wishbone-inspired hangers. Some of these original hangers can be seen at the Frank Lloyd Wright-designed Meyer May House in Grand Rapids.

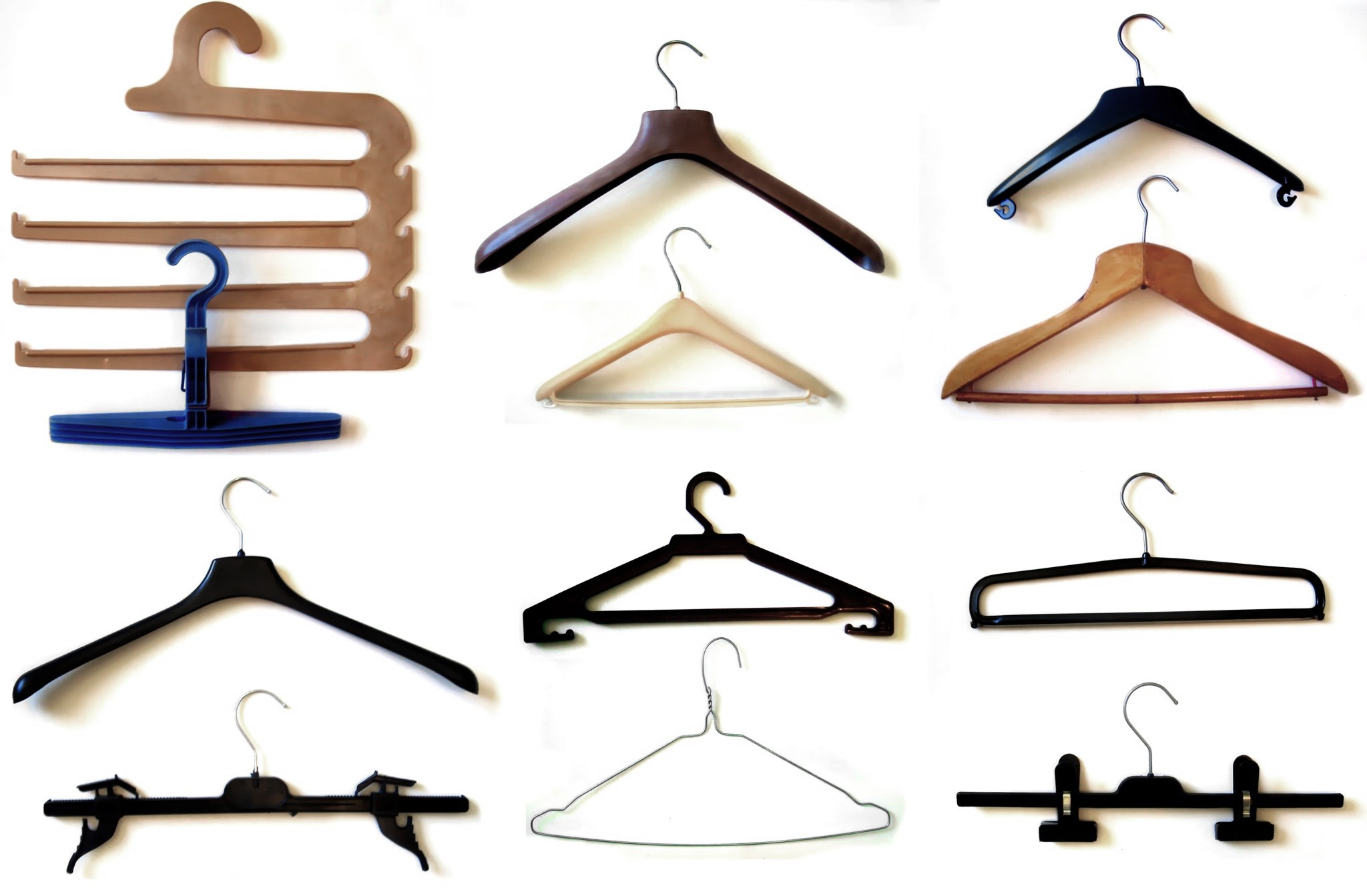
Various clothes hangers

In 1932 Schuyler C. Hulett patented an improved design, which used cardboard tubes mounted on the upper and lower parts of the wire to prevent wrinkles, and in 1935 Elmer D. Rogers added a tube on the lower bar, which is still used.

Hangers can be made in wood, wire, plastic, rarely from a rubber substance and other materials. Some are padded with fine materials, such as satin, for expensive clothes, lingerie and fancy dresses. The soft, plush padding is intended to protect garments from shoulder dents that wire hangers may make. A caped hanger is an inexpensive wire clothing hanger covered in paper. Caped hangers are used by dry cleaners to protect garments after cleaning. Used wire hangers may be recycled, or returned to the dry cleaner.

Travel hangers, which are designed to provide a compact solution for travelers who require a simple, lightweight and foldable hanger that can accommodate their clothing needs, have been specifically designed with the traveler in mind, with their folding design allowing users to wrap their clothing around the hanger, making it easier to pack and store in their luggage.

This evolution has not only focused on their functionality and design but also on their environmental impact. The use of recycled plastics is one way in which hangers can be more sustainable. The production of hangers from recycled materials reduces waste, conserves energy and resources, and lowers greenhouse gas emissions. This development is a natural progression in the evolution of hangers, aligning with global efforts to reduce plastic waste and promote sustainability.

== Unintended uses ==
The wire is versatile, and wire clothes hangers are often used as cheap sources of semi-tough wire, more available than baling wire for all sorts of home projects. The use of wire clothes hangers for use as makeshift welding rod has been common for nearly 100 years. Similarly, many similar do-it-yourself and children's projects use wire hangers as holders of various types, from keeping a brake caliper from hanging by the brake line during auto repair work to securing a gate on a birdcage. The much-loved 'Advent crown' made for children's TV program Blue Peter was made from four-wire coathangers. Coathangers can be used to make dowsing rods. After sanding, wire hangers also find uses as conducting wire for uses as varied as hot-wiring cars to games to testing hand steadiness. They are commonly used to gain forcible entry into older automobiles whose locks and entry systems are not protected from such methods. There is a long history of using wire coat hangers as replacement car radio antennas. Clothes hangers are also commonly used as an implement for roasting marshmallows or hot dogs at camp-outs.

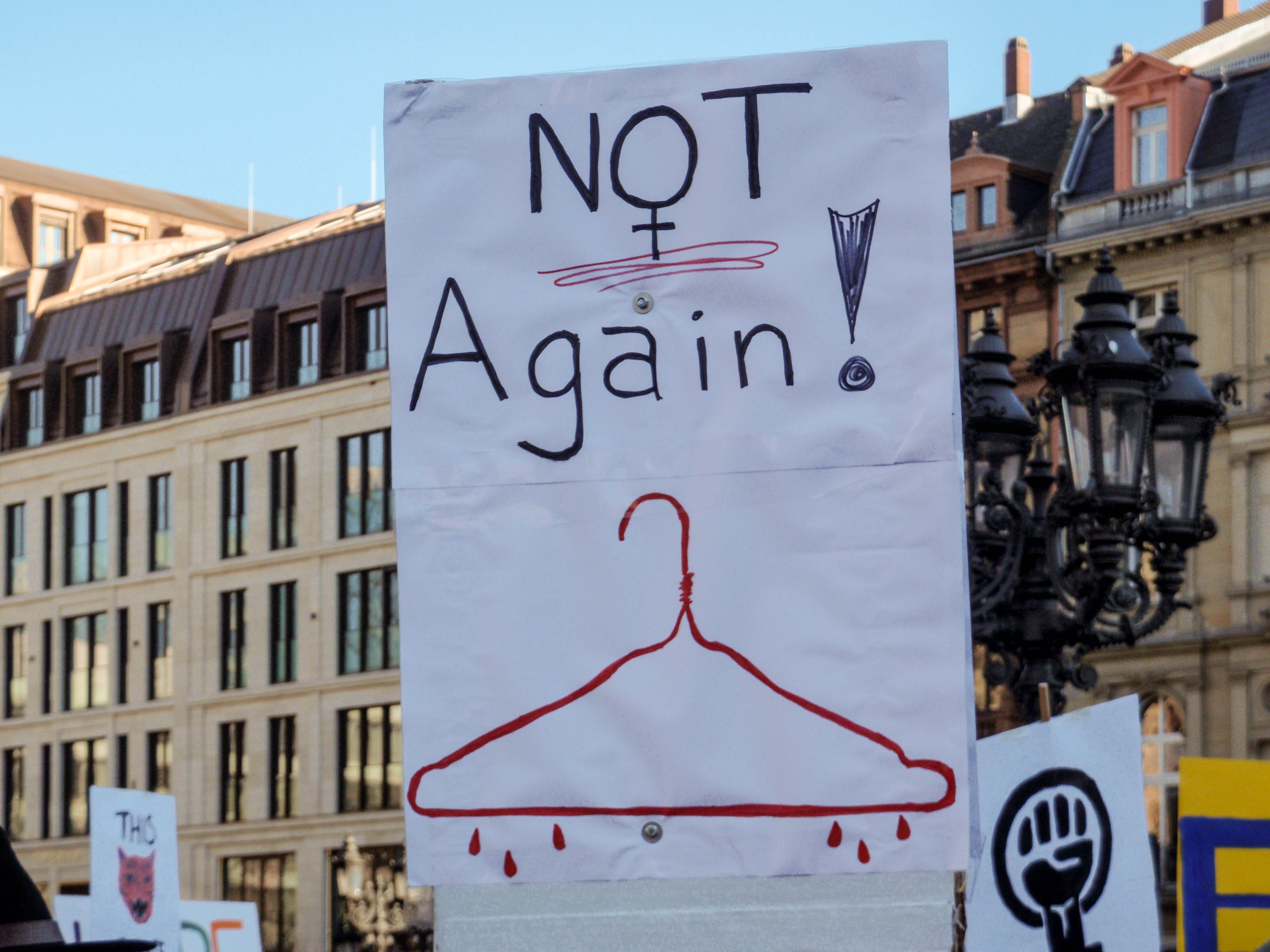
Abortion poster with wire hanger during Women's March, Frankfurt, 2017

Collecticus magazine reported in October 2007 that clothes hangers have now become collectible, especially those with a famous company or event advertised across the front. For example, a 1950 Butlins hanger sold for £10.10 in October 2006 within Collecticus.

In 1995, while performing surgery in an airliner at 35,000 feet (11,000 m), orthopedic surgeon Angus Wallace and his fellow doctor Tom Wong used an unfolded coathanger, sterilised with brandy, as a trocar to stiffen a catheter for use as a chest tube to relieve a passenger's pneumothorax.

Straightened-out wire clothes hangers have been used to perform unsafe and/or illegal abortions (frequently self-induced) by inserting the wire through the cervix and into the uterus, in order to cause the uterus to expel its contents. This life-threatening method poses severe risks to the person on whom it is performed. At pro-choice protests, wire clothes hangers have been used as symbols of the danger of criminalizing elective abortion.

== Gallery ==
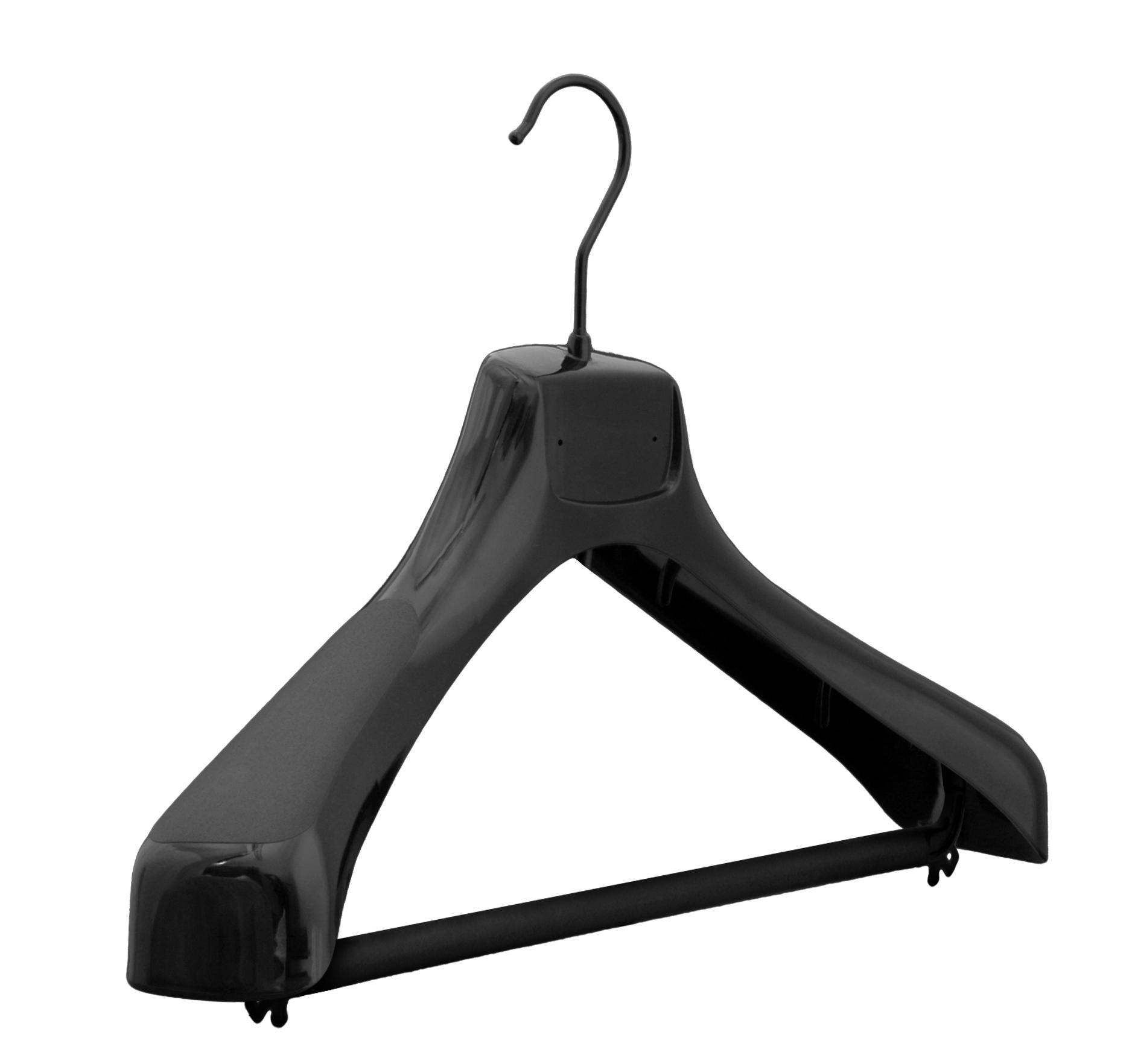
Plastic clothes hanger for suit jackets or heavy coats

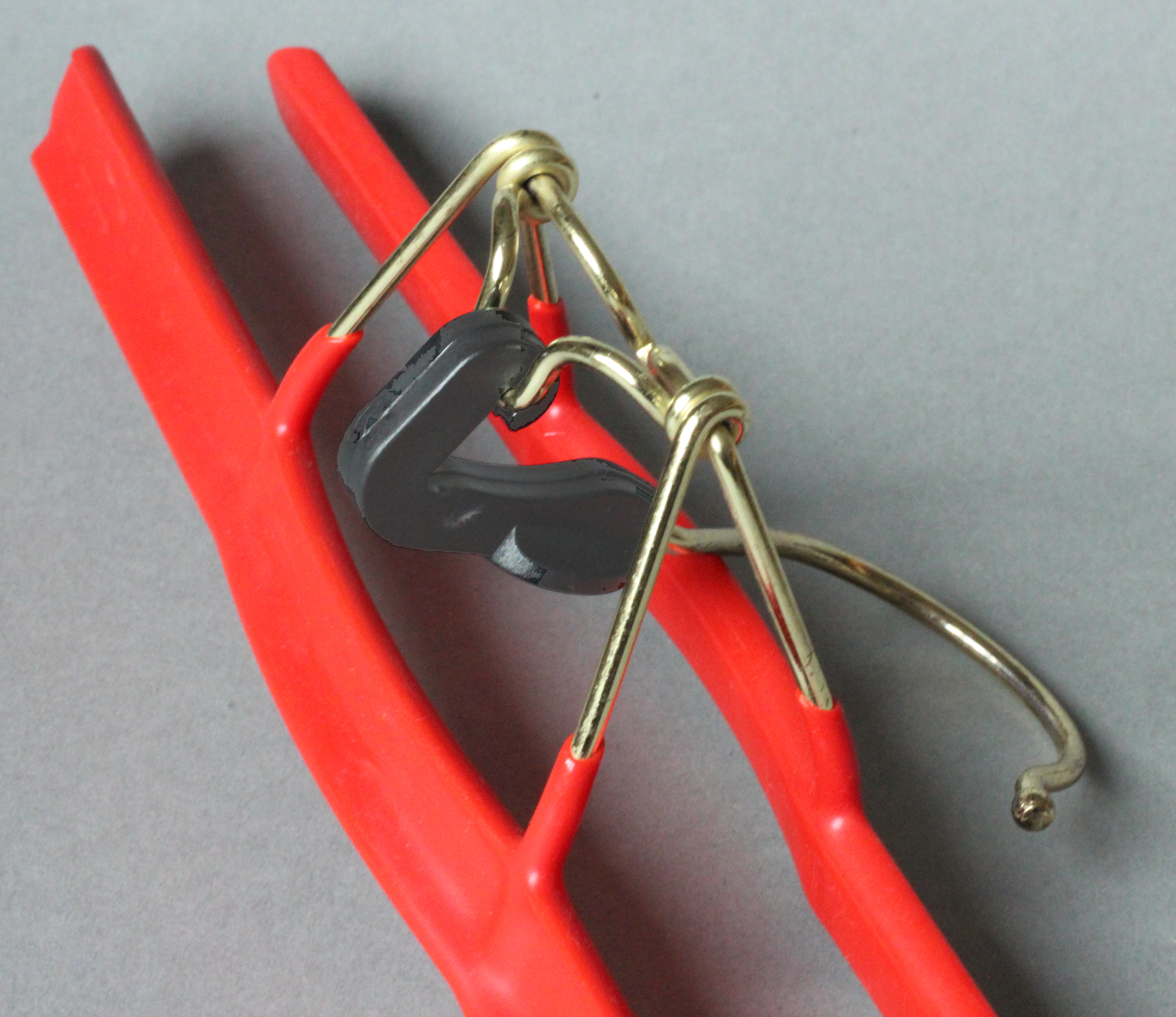
Clamp

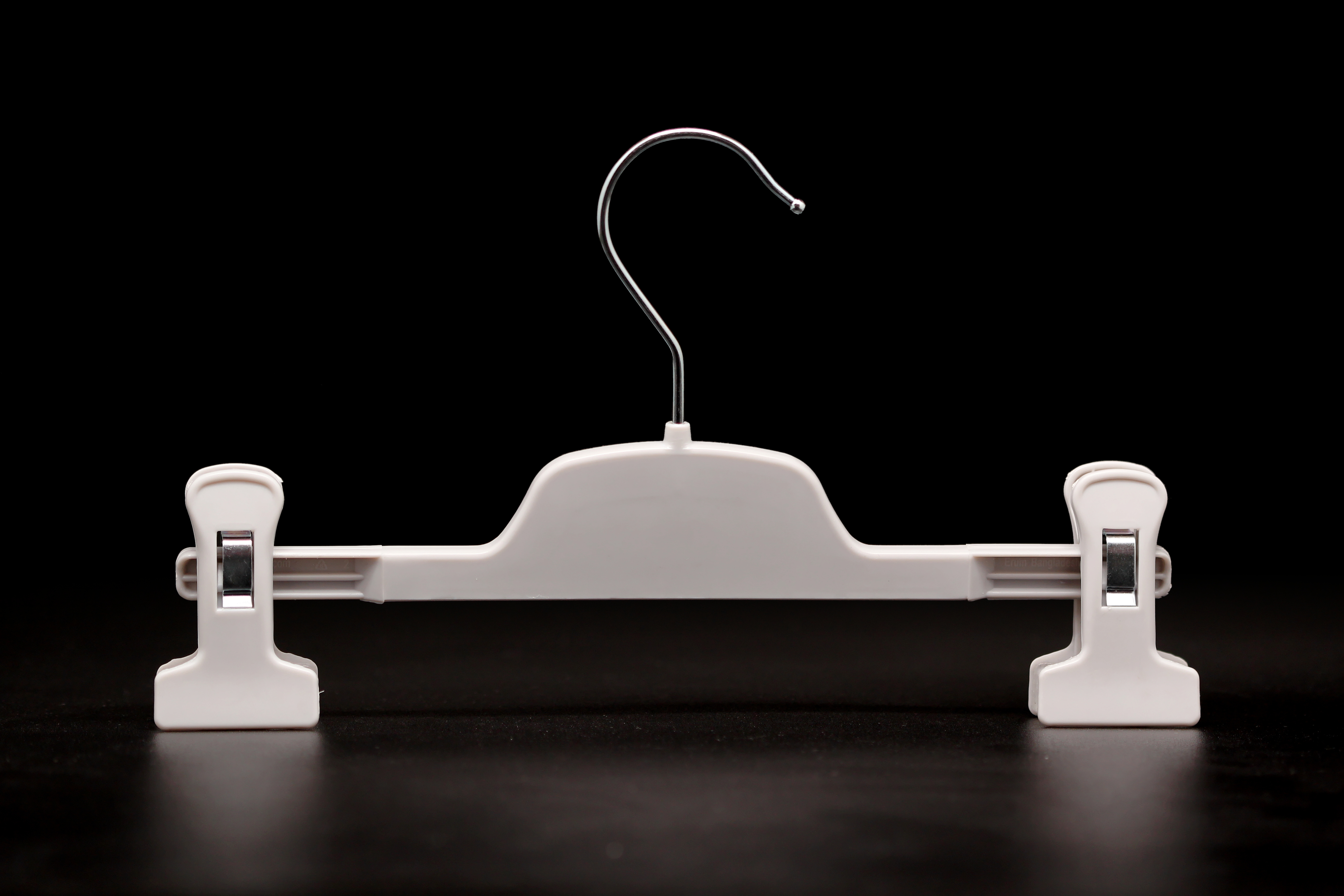
Clip hanger with two clamps

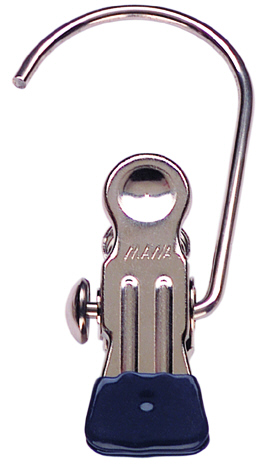
Clip hanger with only one clamp

== See also ==
- Brocchi's Cluster (The Coathanger)
- Clothes line
- Clothes valet
- Coat rack
- Drying rack
- Shoe hanger
