= Vehicle licence =

Document

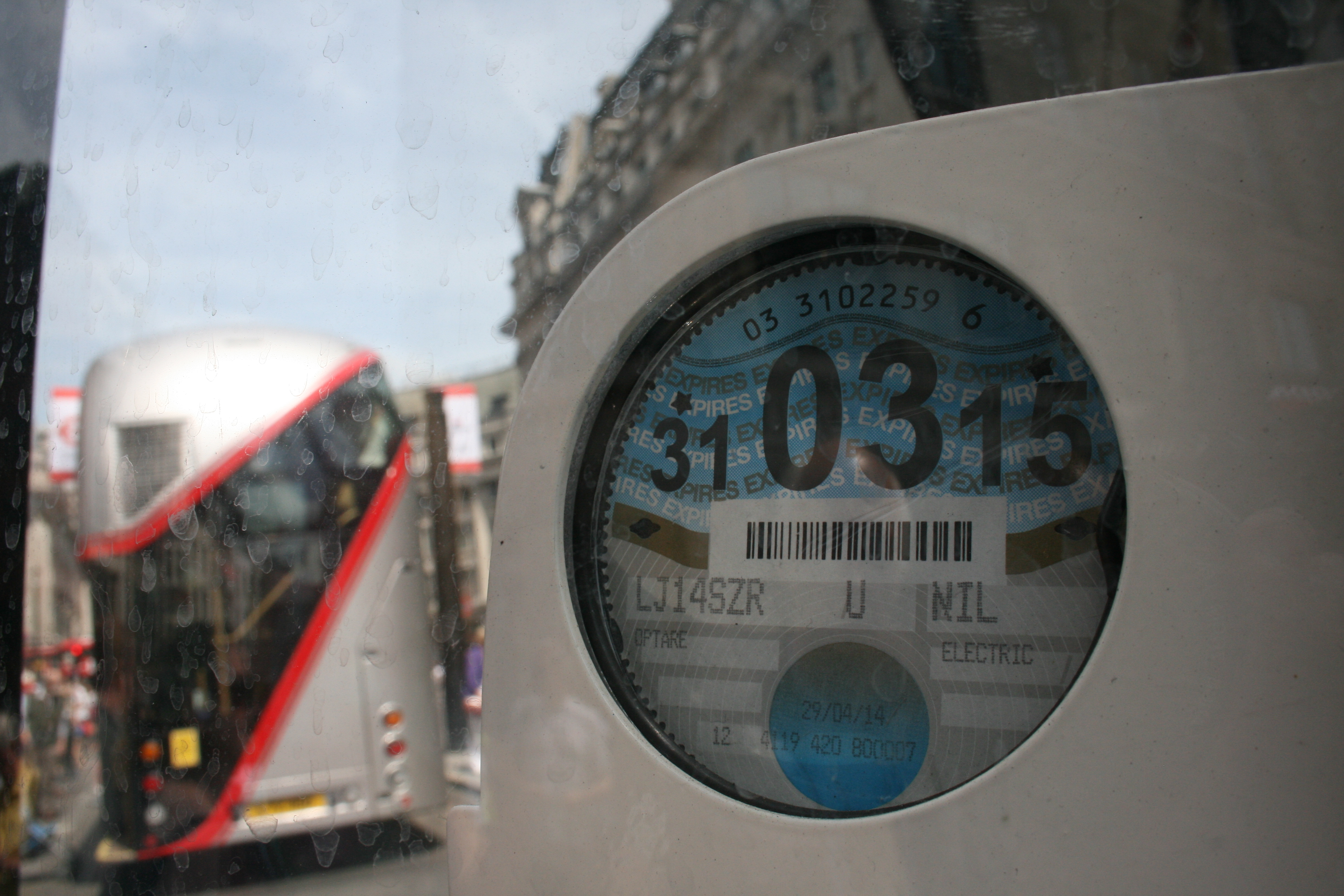
A tax disc formerly issued in the United Kingdom

A vehicle licence (also called a vehicle registration certificate in some jurisdictions) is issued by a motor registration authority in a jurisdiction in respect of a particular motor vehicle. A current licence is required for a motor vehicle to be legally permitted to be used or kept on a public road in the jurisdiction. Usually a licence is valid for one year and an annual licence fee is payable before a new one is issued.

A vehicle licence may be a paper document to be kept in the vehicle at all times. This may be in the form of an adhesive sticker to be affixed or displayed on the windshield of the vehicle or on the registration plate. In some countries, such as the UK, the paper document has been replaced by an electronic record. Authorities can confirm a valid licence via a computer check on the vehicles number plate.

The rules of vehicle licensing are in addition to those of vehicle registration, roadworthiness certification and insurance and other requirements.

Many jurisdictions have ceased issuing or requiring display of registration certificates and have instead adopted number plate recognition systems.

== General ==
In some countries, such as Norway, the owner annually used to get a sticker to place on the registration plate, if the vehicle is permitted for driving.

== Australia ==
In Australia, historically a current registration sticker was required to be displayed on the windscreen of all vehicles, but all states and territories have now ceased issuing such stickers for light vehicles and adopted number plate recognition systems.

Western Australia has not required the display of a sticker since January 2010 and South Australia and Tasmania also do not require a sticker to be displayed.

New South Wales ceased issuing registration stickers for light vehicles on 1 January 2013; Victoria ceased on 1 January 2014; Northern Territory and the Australian Capital Territory ceased on 1 July 2014; and Queensland ceased on 1 October 2014.

== Germany ==
In Germany, a driver is required to carry a vehicle licence (called the "Fahrzeugschein") containing vehicle owner data, technical specifications and car modifications. Additionally, each car has two registration plate stickers, one to confirm the car has been properly registered, and one to indicate it has passed its vehicle inspection (Hauptuntersuchung or HU) and the date by which the next inspection is due. While the vehicle licence and the registration sticker are permanent, the vehicle inspection sticker is renewed after each inspection.

== Guernsey ==
In Guernsey road tax and the display of a tax disc was abolished in 2008 when fuel tax was increased by 14p per litre. Vehicles now display an insurance certificate.

== Ireland ==
In Ireland, a tax disc must also be displayed, which is of the same format as that in the UK. However, in addition, a square insurance "disc" must also be displayed to show that the vehicle has the legally required third party insurance. Private cars over 4 years old require a similar format "disc" from the National Car Test service to show roadworthiness.

== Malta ==
In Malta, tax discs are very similar in appearance to their UK counterparts, and are also required to be visible on the left-hand side of the windscreen. The disc proves that the vehicle has valid insurance, and that it has passed its Vehicle Roadworthiness Test (VRT).

== Russia and the EAEU ==
Russian vehicle passport

A vehicle title (Russian: Паспорт транспортного средства) typically contains the following information: the vehicle identification number (VIN); make, model, name, and category of the vehicle (in accordance with the 1968 Convention on Road Traffic, adopted by the UN Conference on Road Traffic in Vienna); year of manufacture; engine model and serial number; chassis and body numbers; body color; engine power, displacement, and type; maximum authorized mass; unladen weight; as well as details regarding the manufacturer, the country of export, and any customs restrictions.

For vehicles manufactured within the Russian Federation, the vehicle title is issued by the manufacturer; for vehicles imported from abroad, it is issued by customs authorities. The title is provided to the vehicle owner by customs authorities (at the location where customs clearance takes place), by the seller (or the manufacturer's representative) at the time of the vehicle's initial sale, or—in cases where a duplicate title is required—by the local State Automobile Inspectorate (GIBDD) office where the vehicle is registered.

Unified electronic vehicle title document

In 2014, the Eurasian Economic Union member states concluded an agreement to replace national vehicle title documents with a unified electronic vehicle title document. Initially, the plan was to begin issuing EPTS documents on July 1, 2016, and to cease the issuance of paper-based titles by January 1, 2017; in the interim, EPTS documents were made available for initial registrations where possible. However, due to the lack of necessary infrastructure within the EAEU countries to support this transition, it was decided to postpone the discontinuation of paper-based titles until July 1, 2018. This deadline was subsequently extended to November 1, 2019. As several EAEU member states remained unprepared for a full transition to the EPTS system, the deadline was extended once more in October 2019: the transition to the electronic title system was pushed to November 1, 2020, while the transition to electronic titles for self-propelled machinery was set for November 1, 2021.

For vehicles manufactured within Russia, the issuance of paper-based titles ceased on November 1, 2019; manufacturers now issue only electronic titles (EPTS) for new vehicles. As of the end of March 2020, approximately 570,000 EPTS documents had been issued in Russia, compared to about 10 in Belarus.

Previously issued paper-based titles remain valid, though vehicle owners may voluntarily choose to convert them into electronic titles. If an EPTS is issued for a vehicle, no paper-based title is provided. An electronic vehicle passport must also be obtained when importing a vehicle independently, or in the event that a paper vehicle passport is lost or damaged.

In Russia, EPTS databases are maintained by JSC "Electronic Passport" (AO "Elektronny pasport"), an entity affiliated with the state corporation Rostec. An electronic vehicle passport consists of data regarding a specific vehicle, stored in the organization's database and linked to a 15-digit identification number. Vehicle owners may print an extract from the organization's website for informational purposes; however, this extract does not constitute an official document and cannot serve as a substitute for a paper or electronic vehicle passport. As of January 2020, access to EPTS data is available via the "Gosuslugi" (State Services) portal or through an electronic key utilizing an enhanced qualified digital signature (such as those provided by "CryptoPro" or "Signal-COM").

As of July 2020, a conflict remains within the legislation (specifically the Code of Administrative Offenses, or KoAP): the law prohibits operating a vehicle without the original registration documents—which include the vehicle passport, yet an electronic vehicle passport cannot, by definition, be issued as a physical document. Furthermore, an extract from the website is not considered an official document (let alone an original) and carries no legal weight. It should also be noted that, in certain locations, online access may not be available.

== Sri Lanka ==
In Sri Lanka, a revenue licence must be displayed on the vehicle, and is evidence that the necessary vehicle excise duty has been paid for the specific vehicle. It is normally placed on the left side of the windscreen if it is a four-wheeled vehicle. A revenue licence is issued for a period of one year and must be renewed annually, during which an emissions test must be performed.

== United Kingdom ==
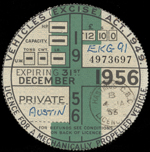
A 1956 UK tax disc

In the United Kingdom, vehicle excise duty was introduced in 1888, and between 1920 and 1 October 2014 the vehicle licence, colloquially known as a "tax disc", came in the form of a paper disc 75 millimetres (3 inches) in diameter to be displayed on the inside of a vehicle's front windscreen, and was evidence that the necessary vehicle excise duty had been paid for the vehicle.

From 1 October 2014 the physical paper disc was no longer issued, with enforcement of the taxation now being done through the automatic number plate recognition (ANPR) system. The Daily Telegraph reported in November 2017 that road tax evasion had tripled as a result of tax discs no longer being produced.

== United States and Canada ==
In the United States and Canada, an annual or biennial sticker is usually applied to the plate, with a few exceptions. For example, the District of Columbia and a few U.S. states use windscreen stickers, and some U.S. and Canadian jurisdictions issue permanent fleet licence plates. Also, some U.S. states, such as Virginia, require that a motorist obtain a vehicle licence from the city, county, or town government in addition to registering the vehicle with the appropriate agency of the state government, or, in some cases, the federal government.

Some of these jurisdictions have done away with the sticker, leaving registration status available only from a centralized database which authorities reference (by hand, or via automated number plate recognition).

== See also ==
- Velology – the collection of tax discs and their history and design.
