= Velology =

Study and collection of vehicle tax discs

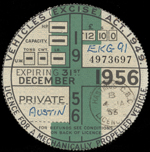
1956 example tax disc

Velology is the study and collection of vehicle tax discs, particularly of those issued in the United Kingdom from 1 January 1921 to 30 September 2014.

A tax disc was a circular certificate that vehicle owners had to place on the front windscreen of road vehicles, as visual proof that vehicle tax has been paid. Similar systems exist in some other countries, such as in Ireland, but the use of automatic number plate recognition has rendered tax discs redundant in the United Kingdom.

The word is a combination of the acronym "VEL", for vehicle excise licence, and -ology. Collectors are known as velologists.

== History of tax discs ==
The vehicle excise duty was first introduced in the United Kingdom in 1889, but the requirement to display a paper tax disc on the vehicle came into force on 1 January 1921. Initially, tax discs were issued for one year (annual) to 31 December, or for three months (quarterly) to 24 March, 30 June, 30 September or 31 December.

Early discs were made from plain paper, without perforations; the selvedge was cut or folded to create the main circular shape. Colour printing was introduced in 1923. Advertising on the reverse of the disc was allowed from 1924, with companies such as Shell Oil placing advertisements. This was abolished in 1926, after which the reverse showed text relating to the refund available for unexpired licences. Perforations were used from 1938, enabling a better fit within the standard disc holders; however, the perforations were missing from 1942 to 1952, perhaps as a result of equipment damage during the war. In 1961 major changes occurred, with a redesign of the printed pattern – for better security – and a new system of monthly issues, rather than the standard December expiry of the past. From then on, the expiry month was displayed. From 2001, watermarking and embossing were added to prevent fraud.

The last tax discs in the United Kingdom expired on 30 September 2015, but the requirement to display them ended on 1 October 2014. In the last month before the abolition of tax discs came into force, the DVLA issued some new tax discs on printer paper, to save costs.

== Design ==
The design of British licence disc has varied over the decades since its introduction on 1 January 1921. Among the factors for its evolution are the changing legislation and the increase in security features to mitigate counterfeiting. The latest series (2003) incorporated a bar code to verify its authenticity with the vehicle it was registered to, and to increase efficiency of renewal applications as renewal via the internet was introduced. A design variant was adopted in Wales in the early 1970s with the month expressed as a number instead of by name and other details printed additionally in Welsh. This was introduced when the government decided that all official documentation in Wales would be bilingual, but it was judged that the print size would be too small for the name of the month to be abbreviated and displayed in two languages. Later, this design with the month expressed as a number was adopted throughout the UK.

=== 1921 series ===
The 1921 series was the first design of the licence disc which were required to be displayed in every British vehicle since 1 January 1921. They were issued with two possible lengths of duration: one year (annual) or three months (sometimes referred to as a quarterly licence). Quarterly licences were issued on coloured paper to differentiate between the two periods of duty they were issued for.

Annual Road Fund Licence (1921 and 1922)
Year of expiry	Main colour	Image (obverse)	Obverse	Reverse	Remarks
1921	None		Cross-shaped layout with emblems of Regions of the United Kingdom; Circumference text reads: “Expiring 31 Dec. [Year]. … Licence for a mechanically propelled vehicle.”	Text within circular ring reads: “This Licence Card must be exhibited in the regulation position on the vehicle when in use upon a public road [See Note in the Licence Registration Book]. It must be given up to the Post Office or to the Registration Authority on expiry. A new licence cannot be issued until the old one is surrendered.”	(None)
1922	None		Cross-shaped layout with emblems of Regions of the United Kingdom; Circumference text reads: “Expiring 31 Dec. [Year]. … Licence for a mechanically propelled vehicle.”	Text within circular ring reads: “This Licence Card must be exhibited in the regulation position on the vehicle when in use upon a public road [See Note in the Licence Registration Book]. It must be given up to the Post Office or to the Registration Authority on expiry. A new licence cannot be issued until the old one is surrendered.”	(None)

=== 1923 series ===
Annual Road Fund Licence (1921-1931)
Year of Expiry	Main Colour	Image (obverse)	Lifespan of design	Obverse	Reverse	Remarks
1923	Green		Jan. 1923 to Dec. 1931	— Cross-shaped layout with emblems of Regions of the United Kingdom and vertical colour band — Circumference text reads: “Expiring 31 Dec. [Year]. … Licence for a mechanically propelled vehicle.” — Background text: “Road Fund Licence”	Text within circular ring reads: “This Licence Card must be exhibited in the regulation position on the vehicle when in use upon a public road (See Note in the Licence Registration Book). It must be destroyed on expiry unless renewed at a Post Office when it must be surrendered.”	January 1923: First issue of annual licences with colour printing
1924	Red		Jan. 1923 to Dec. 1931	— Cross-shaped layout with emblems of Regions of the United Kingdom and vertical colour band — Circumference text reads: “Expiring 31 Dec. [Year]. … Licence for a mechanically propelled vehicle.” — Background text: “Road Fund Licence”	Text within circular ring reads: “This Licence Card must be exhibited in the regulation position on the vehicle when in use upon a public road (See Note in the Licence Registration Book). It must be destroyed on expiry unless renewed at a Post Office when it must be surrendered.”	
1925	Blue		Jan. 1923 to Dec. 1931	— Cross-shaped layout with emblems of Regions of the United Kingdom and vertical colour band — Circumference text reads: “Expiring 31 Dec. [Year]. … Licence for a mechanically propelled vehicle.” — Background text: “Road Fund Licence”	Advertisement for Shell Motor Oils	
1926	Orange		Jan. 1923 to Dec. 1931	— Cross-shaped layout with emblems of Regions of the United Kingdom and vertical colour band — Circumference text reads: “Expiring 31 Dec. [Year]. … Licence for a mechanically propelled vehicle.” — Background text: “Road Fund Licence”	Surrender of Licences text	
1927	Purple		Jan. 1923 to Dec. 1931	— Cross-shaped layout with emblems of Regions of the United Kingdom and vertical colour band — Circumference text reads: “Expiring 31 Dec. [Year]. … Licence for a mechanically propelled vehicle.” — Background text: “Road Fund Licence”	Surrender of Licences text	
1928	Red		Jan. 1923 to Dec. 1931	— Cross-shaped layout with emblems of Regions of the United Kingdom and vertical colour band — Circumference text reads: “Expiring 31 Dec. [Year]. … Licence for a mechanically propelled vehicle.” — Background text: “Road Fund Licence”		
1929	Green		Jan. 1923 to Dec. 1931	— Cross-shaped layout with emblems of Regions of the United Kingdom and vertical colour band — Circumference text reads: “Expiring 31 Dec. [Year]. … Licence for a mechanically propelled vehicle.” — Background text: “Road Fund Licence”		
1930	Orange		Jan. 1923 to Dec. 1931	— Cross-shaped layout with emblems of Regions of the United Kingdom and vertical colour band — Circumference text reads: “Expiring 31 Dec. [Year]. … Licence for a mechanically propelled vehicle.” — Background text: “Road Fund Licence”		
1931	Blue		Jan. 1923 to Dec. 1931	— Cross-shaped layout with emblems of Regions of the United Kingdom and vertical colour band — Circumference text reads: “Expiring 31 Dec. [Year]. … Licence for a mechanically propelled vehicle.” — Background text: “Road Fund Licence”		
These images are to scale at 0.7 pixel per millimetre (18 pixel per inch). For table standards, see the banknote specification table.

=== 1938 series ===
The 1938 series of Annual licence discs were a minor design revision to the 1932 series, and were issued from 1 January 1938 to July 1950. The background pattern text was revised to read "Mechanically propelled vehicle licence", instead of "Road Fund Licence".

=== 1951 series ===
The 1951 series were first issued on 1 January 1951 as a revision to the previous series. The emblems of Regions of the United Kingdom were replaced with the expiry year and the arrangement of the expiry date was modified to increase legibility. Licence discs issued for 1954 to 1956 removed the requirement for specifying the colour of the vehicle. A diagonal colour band overprint was used for licences for 1951 and 1952, and a vertical band for the remainder of the series.

Annual Vehicle Licence (1951-1956)
Year of Expiry	Main Colour	Image (obverse)	Obverse	Reverse	Remarks
1951	Green		Cross-shaped layout with expiry year in black; circumference text: “Vehicles (Excise) Act, 1949. - Licence for a mechanically propelled vehicle.”; background text: “Mechanically propelled vehicle licence”	Surrender of Licences (Vehicles (Excise) Act, 1949, Section 12.)	
1952	Orange		Cross-shaped layout with expiry year in black; circumference text: “Vehicles (Excise) Act, 1949. - Licence for a mechanically propelled vehicle.”; background text: “Mechanically propelled vehicle licence”	Surrender of Licences (Vehicles (Excise) Act, 1949, Section 12.)	
1953	Red		Cross-shaped layout with expiry year in black; circumference text: “Vehicles (Excise) Act, 1949. - Licence for a mechanically propelled vehicle.”; background text: “Mechanically propelled vehicle licence”	Surrender of Licences (Vehicles (Excise) Act, 1949, Section 12.)	
1954	Blue		Cross-shaped layout with expiry year in black; circumference text: “Vehicles (Excise) Act, 1949. - Licence for a mechanically propelled vehicle.”; background text: “Mechanically propelled vehicle licence”	Surrender of Licences (Vehicles (Excise) Act, 1949, Section 12.)	Certain issues were misprinted with the 1953 expiry date and were overprinted with 1954 on the top quadrant.
1955	Brown		Cross-shaped layout with expiry year in black; circumference text: “Vehicles (Excise) Act, 1949. - Licence for a mechanically propelled vehicle.”; background text: “Mechanically propelled vehicle licence”	Surrender of Licences (Vehicles (Excise) Act, 1949, Section 12.)	
1956	Green		Cross-shaped layout with expiry year in black; circumference text: “Vehicles (Excise) Act, 1949. - Licence for a mechanically propelled vehicle.”; background text: “Mechanically propelled vehicle licence”	Surrender of Licences (Vehicles (Excise) Act, 1949, Section 12.)	

=== 1957 series ===
The 1957 series were first issued on 1 January 1957 and continued until the replacement of quarter-year licences with four-month licences on 1 October 1960.

Annual Vehicle Licence (1957-1960)
Year of Expiry	Main Colour	Image (obverse)	Obverse	Reverse	Remarks
1957	Red		Expiry year flanked between issuing stamp area; circumference text: “Vehicles (Excise) Act, 1949. - Licence for a mechanically propelled vehicle.”; background text: “Mechanically propelled vehicle licence”	Surrender of Licences (Vehicles (Excise) Act, 1949, Section 12.)	
1958	Blue		Expiry year flanked between issuing stamp area; circumference text: “Vehicles (Excise) Act, 1949. - Licence for a mechanically propelled vehicle.”; background text: “Mechanically propelled vehicle licence”	Surrender of Licences (Vehicles (Excise) Act, 1949, Section 12.)	The type size of the expiry year was increased.
1959	Orange		Expiry year flanked between issuing stamp area; circumference text: “Vehicles (Excise) Act, 1949. - Licence for a mechanically propelled vehicle.”; background text: “Mechanically propelled vehicle licence”	Surrender of Licences (Vehicles (Excise) Act, 1949, Section 12.)	The type size of the expiry year was increased.
1960	Green		Expiry year flanked between issuing stamp area; circumference text: “Vehicles (Excise) Act, 1949. - Licence for a mechanically propelled vehicle.”; background text: “Mechanically propelled vehicle licence”	Surrender of Licences (Vehicles (Excise) Act, 1949, Section 12.)	The type size of the expiry year was increased.

=== 1961 series ===
Annual Vehicle Licence (1961–present)
Year of Expiry	Main Colour	Image (obverse)	Lifespan of design	Obverse	Reverse	Remarks
1967	Green		Jan 61 - May 78	Coloured ribbon with month-year expiry date; circumference text reads: “This licence expires on last day of month shown”. Colour sequence: red for leap years, then blue, brown, green.	Surrender of Licences (Vehicles (Excise) Act, 1962, Section 9.)	
1983	Green		31:10:77 - 30:9:87	Expiry date (DD:MM:YY) over coloured ribbon.	Refund of Duty in plain text.	
1985	Blue		31:10:77 - 30:9:87	Expiry date (DD:MM:YY) over coloured ribbon.	Refund of Duty in plain text.	Minor design revisions.
1986	Brown		31:10:77 - 30:9:87	Expiry date (DD:MM:YY) over coloured ribbon.	Refund of Duty in plain text.	Final year of brown-coloured licences to date.
1987	Purple		31:10:77 - 30:9:87	Expiry date (DD:MM:YY) over coloured ribbon.	Refund of Duty in plain text.	First issue of purple-coloured licences since 1927 (annual). Subsequently purple would replace brown in the 4-yearly colour sequence.
1987	Purple		31:10:87 - 1993	Upper half: Expiry date (DD:MM:YY) over colour ribbon with continuous wavy text “DVLC”; two elliptical holes and “EXPIRES” above the ribbon, and “DVLC” embossing. Lower half: gradual shading and stamp area in metallic ink, with expiry date (DD:MM:YY) in pale colour; 4 rows of black dotted lines in pale colour; bottom-most line split by stamp area.	Refund of Duty; lower half inverse in colour.	First issue of purple-coloured licences since 1927 (annual). Subsequently purple would replace brown in the 4-yearly colour sequence.
1990	Purple		31:10:87 - 1993	Upper half: Expiry date (DD:MM:YY) over colour ribbon with continuous wavy text “DVLC”; two elliptical holes and “EXPIRES” above the ribbon, and “DVLC” embossing. Lower half: gradual shading and stamp area in metallic ink, with expiry date (DD:MM:YY) in pale colour; 4 rows of black dotted lines in pale colour; bottom-most line split by stamp area.	Refund of Duty; lower half inverse in colour.	
1992	Red		31:10:87 - 1993	Upper half: Expiry date (DD:MM:YY) over colour ribbon with continuous wavy text “DVLC”; two elliptical holes and “EXPIRES” above the ribbon, and “DVLC” embossing. Lower half: gradual shading and stamp area in metallic ink, with expiry date (DD:MM:YY) in pale colour; 4 rows of black dotted lines in pale colour; bottom-most line split by stamp area.	Refund of Duty; lower half inverse in colour.	
1993	Blue		31:10:87 - 1993	Upper half: Expiry date (DD:MM:YY) over colour ribbon with continuous wavy text “DVLC”; two elliptical holes and “EXPIRES” above the ribbon, and “DVLC” embossing. Lower half: gradual shading and stamp area in metallic ink, with expiry date (DD:MM:YY) in pale colour; 4 rows of black dotted lines in pale colour; bottom-most line split by stamp area.	Refund of Duty; lower half inverse in colour.	Certain discs expiring in 1993 retain old features from the 1987 series.
1993	Blue		1993 - 29:2:04	Upper half: Solid colour expiry date (MM YY) over colour ribbon with wavy text “EXPIRES”, with two elliptical holes near edge and “DVLA” embossing. Lower half: Monotonic shading of roughly ⅓-width sides, with expiry date (DD:MM:YY) and 4 rows of coloured dotted lines in pale colour; bottom-most line split by stamp area in metallic ink.	Refund of Duty and Non-transferability clause; lower half inverse in colour.	Certain discs expiring in 1993 retain old features from the 1987 series.
1994	Purple		1993 - 29:2:04	Upper half: Solid colour expiry date (MM YY) over colour ribbon with wavy text “EXPIRES”, with two elliptical holes near edge and “DVLA” embossing. Lower half: Monotonic shading of roughly ⅓-width sides, with expiry date (DD:MM:YY) and 4 rows of coloured dotted lines in pale colour; bottom-most line split by stamp area in metallic ink.	Refund of Duty and Non-transferability clause; lower half inverse in colour.	
1995	Green		1993 - 29:2:04	Upper half: Solid colour expiry date (MM YY) over colour ribbon with wavy text “EXPIRES”, with two elliptical holes near edge and “DVLA” embossing. Lower half: Monotonic shading of roughly ⅓-width sides, with expiry date (DD:MM:YY) and 4 rows of coloured dotted lines in pale colour; bottom-most line split by stamp area in metallic ink.	Refund of Duty and Non-transferability clause; lower half inverse in colour.	Final year of green-coloured licences to date. From 1999 discs, colour sequence became 3-yearly: red/pink, blue, purple.
1996	Red		1993 - 29:2:04	Upper half: Solid colour expiry date (MM YY) over colour ribbon with wavy text “EXPIRES”, with two elliptical holes near edge and “DVLA” embossing. Lower half: Monotonic shading of roughly ⅓-width sides, with expiry date (DD:MM:YY) and 4 rows of coloured dotted lines in pale colour; bottom-most line split by stamp area in metallic ink.	Refund of Duty and Non-transferability clause; lower half inverse in colour.	
These images are to scale at 0.7 pixel per millimetre (18 pixel per inch). For table standards, see the banknote specification table.

=== 2003 series ===
Vehicle Licence (expiring from 2003 to 2015)
Year of Expiry	Main Colour	Image (obverse)	Obverse	Reverse	Remarks
2003	Blue		Upper half: Gold expiry date (DD MM YY) in Univers type over colour background with wavy text “EXPIRES” alternating between gold and white, with two star holes above the day and year. Centre: Barcode in middle with foil strip and two elliptical holes. Lower half: Monotonic shading with white boxes for details and coloured stamp area.	Refund of Duty and Non-transferability clause; lower half inverse in black.	
2004	Purple		Upper half: Gold expiry date (DD MM YY) in Univers type over colour background with wavy text “EXPIRES” alternating between gold and white, with two star holes above the day and year. Centre: Barcode in middle with foil strip and two elliptical holes. Lower half: Monotonic shading with white boxes for details and coloured stamp area.	Refund of Duty and Non-transferability clause; lower half inverse in black.	
2005	Red		Upper half: Gold expiry date (DD MM YY) in Univers type over colour background with wavy text “EXPIRES” alternating between gold and white, with two star holes above the day and year. Centre: Barcode in middle with foil strip and two elliptical holes. Lower half: Monotonic shading with white boxes for details and coloured stamp area.	Refund of Duty and Non-transferability clause; lower half inverse in black.	Tax discs issued from 1 September 2004 have a black expiry date with gold outline.
2005	Red		As before, but expiry date in black with gold outline.	Refund of Duty and Non-transferability clause; lower half inverse in black.	Tax discs issued from 1 September 2004 have a black expiry date with gold outline.
2006	Blue		As before, but expiry date in black with gold outline.	Refund of Duty and Non-transferability clause; lower half inverse in black.	
2007	Purple		As before, but expiry date in black with gold outline.	Refund of Duty and Non-transferability clause; lower half inverse in black.	
2008	Red		As before, but expiry date in black with gold outline.	Refund of Duty and Non-transferability clause; lower half inverse in black.	
2009	Blue		As before, but expiry date in black with gold outline.	Refund of Duty and Non-transferability clause; lower half inverse in black.	
2010	Purple		As before, but expiry date in black with gold outline.	Refund of Duty and Non-transferability clause; lower half inverse in black.	
2011	Red		As before, but expiry date in Arial type and black only.	Refund of Duty and Non-transferability clause; lower half inverse in black.	
2012	Blue		As before, but expiry date in Arial type and black only.	Refund of Duty and Non-transferability clause; lower half inverse in black.	
2013	Purple		As before, but expiry date in Arial type and black only.	Refund of Duty and Non-transferability clause; lower half inverse in black.	
2014	Red		As before, but expiry date in Arial type and black only.	Refund of Duty and Non-transferability clause; lower half inverse in black.	
2015	Blue			Refund of Duty and Non-transferability clause; lower half inverse in black.	
