= Clothes steamer =

Device used to remove wrinkles from garments and fabrics

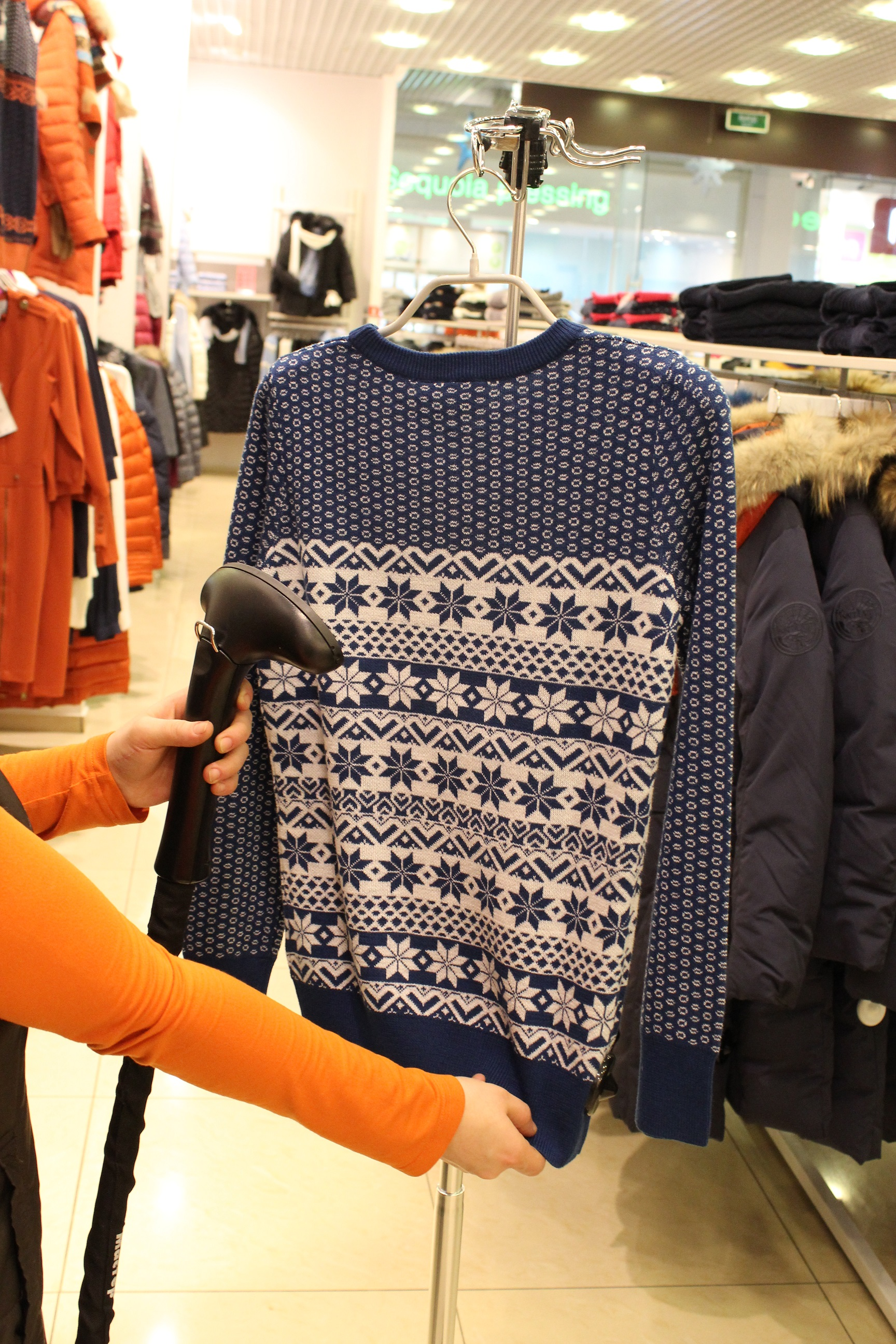
Clothes steamer

A clothes steamer, also called a garment steamer or simply a steamer, is a device used for quickly removing wrinkles from garments and fabrics with the use of high temperature steam. They can for example be used to straighten wrinkles on shirts by releasing tension in the fabric so that it straightens itself. Steamers can also remove smells.

== Function ==
The steamer is filled with water which is heated and exits from the device as steam. Most models have an electrical wire which is connected to an outlet.

=== Features ===
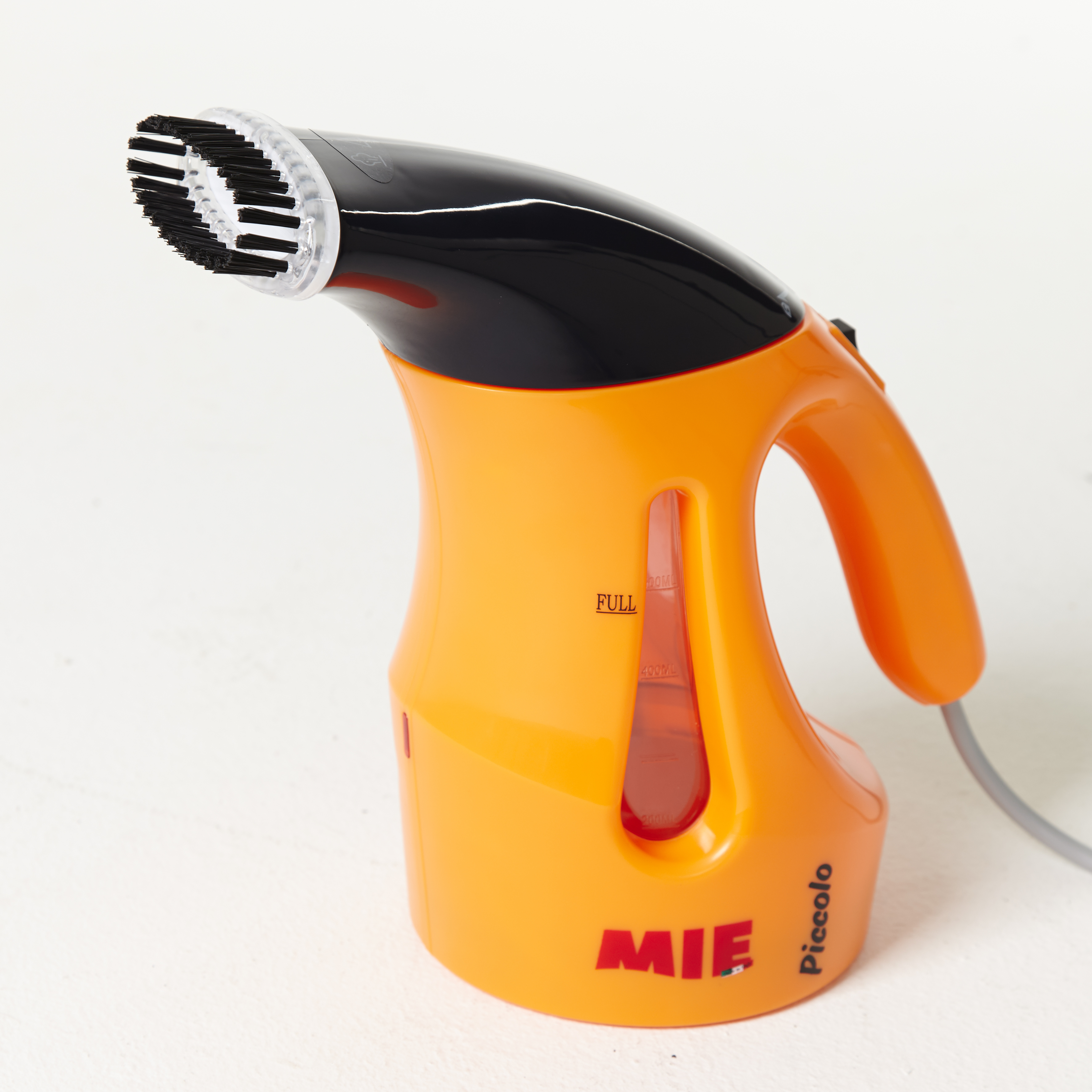
Portable steamer

- Temperature dial for different fabric types
- Steam nozzle
- Water tank
- Clothes hanger and pegs
- Caster wheels
- Crease clip

Many of these features are typically only found on the more expensive vertical valet clothes steamer models. Handheld, or travel, clothes steamers don't often include these additional features and are usually less powerful than their vertical valet steamers counterparts.

== Use ==
Most handheld steamers can be used by first filling the water tank, turning the appliance on and waiting a couple of minutes for the steamer to heat up. The clothing to be steamed is hung in a way allowing access to all of it, particularly creased areas, and preferably steamed using down strokes. Care is needed with delicate fabrics.

== Sizes ==
There are three basic sizes of clothes steamers: commercial floor models used in large manufacturing plants and dry cleaners, mid-sized models for small businesses such as tailors or seamstresses, and handheld mini steamers typically for household use or traveling. Steamers relax fibers rather than flattening like ironing; it is gentler on clothing and eliminates scorching, allowing a clothes steamer to be used, with care, to remove wrinkles from delicate fabrics such as silk.

== Variants ==
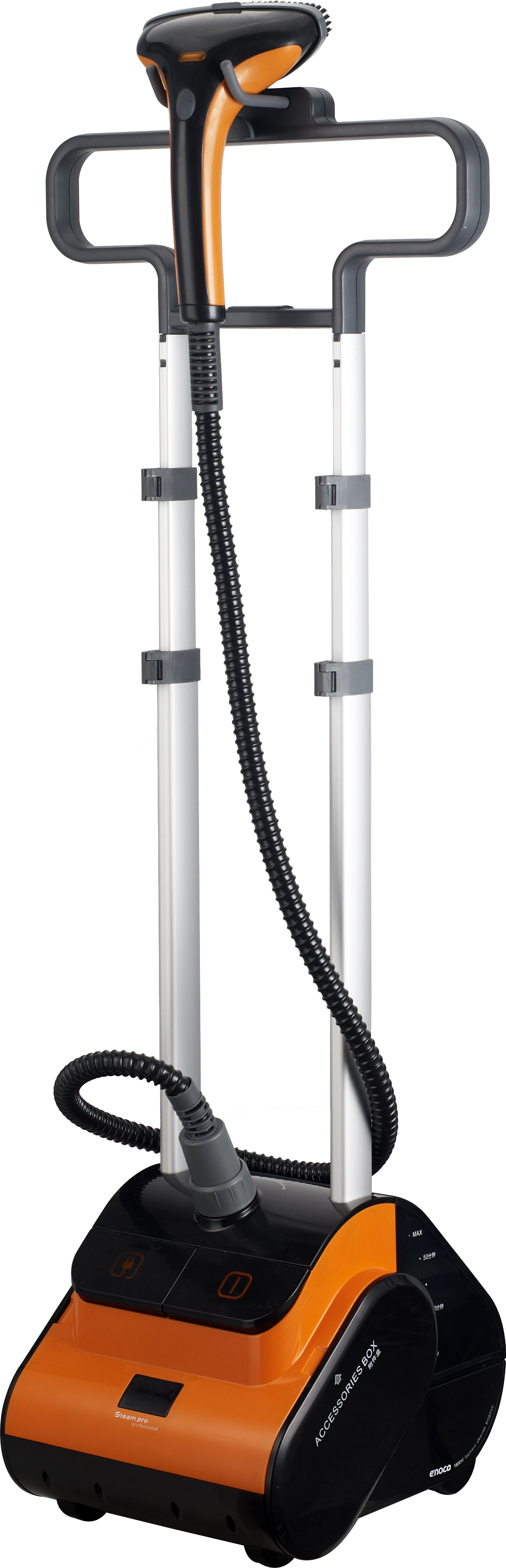
Clothes steamer rack

Steaming cabinet
A cabinet dedicated to steaming clothing. Examples are the LG Styler cabinet steamer launched in 2011 and the 2018 Samsung AirDresser. These cabinets are designed to be placed inside or beside a clothes closet, and use water containers without needing connection to water supply or drainage. Steaming, clothes in a cabinet instead of washing, is said to cause less wear to clothes which are not very soiled, and to use less water. Some steaming cabinets claim the ability to remove allergens such as pollen; LG's steaming system was certified as Asthma & Allergy Friendly by Allergy Standards Limited. A reviewer noted that the Samsung AirDresser did not remove heavy wrinkles from suit jackets. These cabinets may have WiFi smart home connectivity.

Improvised solutions
Improvised low-temperature home steaming—actually using water vapour rather than true steam—can be carried out in a shower cabinet.

== See also ==
- Ironing
- Steam cleaning
- Tunnel finisher
