= List of reptiles of Kansas =

This list of Kansas reptiles includes the snakes, turtles and lizards found in the US state of Kansas.

== Turtles ==
Kansas is home to 15 species of turtles.

Family Chelydridae – snapping turtles

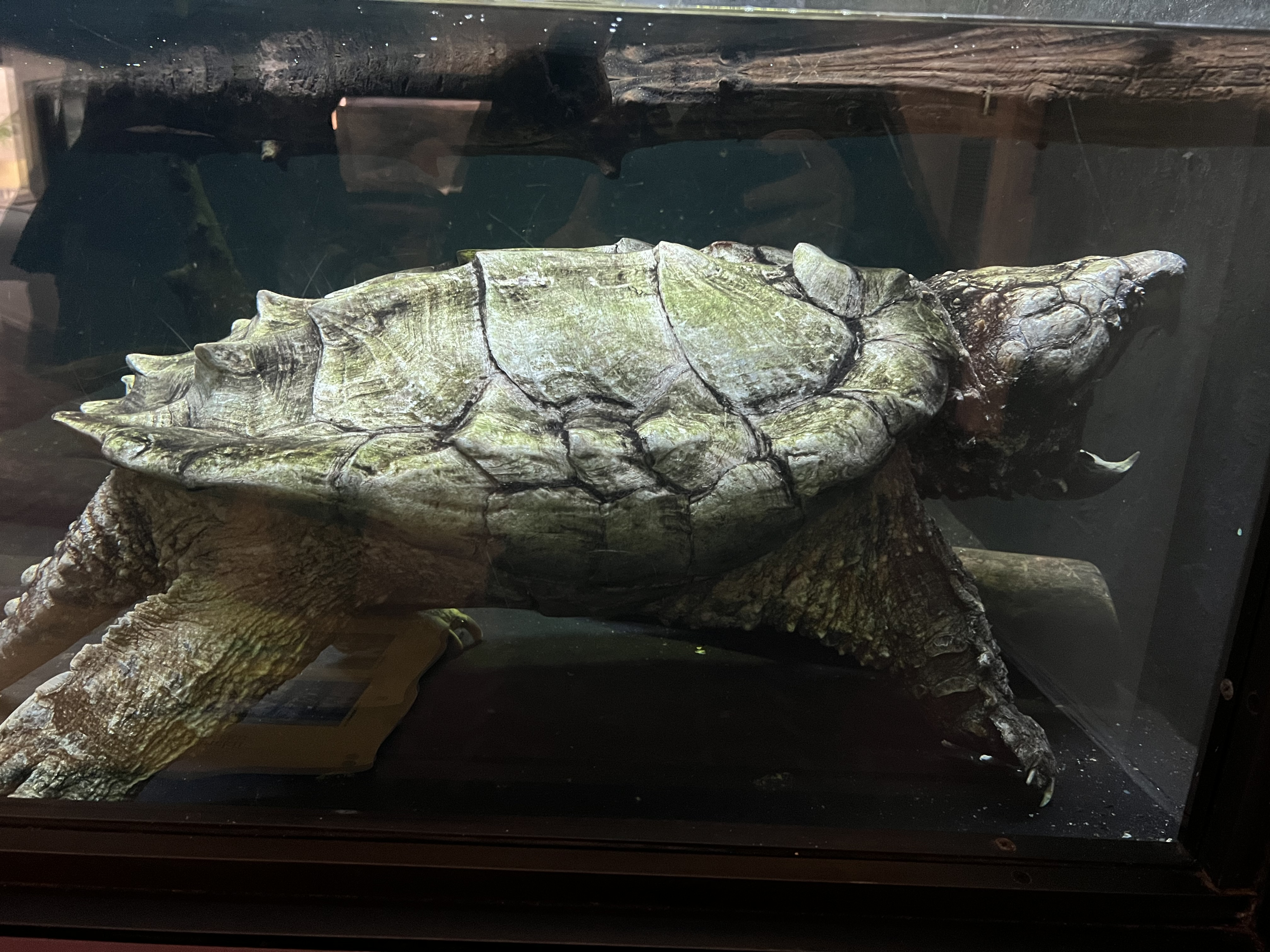
- Alligator snapping turtle (Macrochelys temminckii)
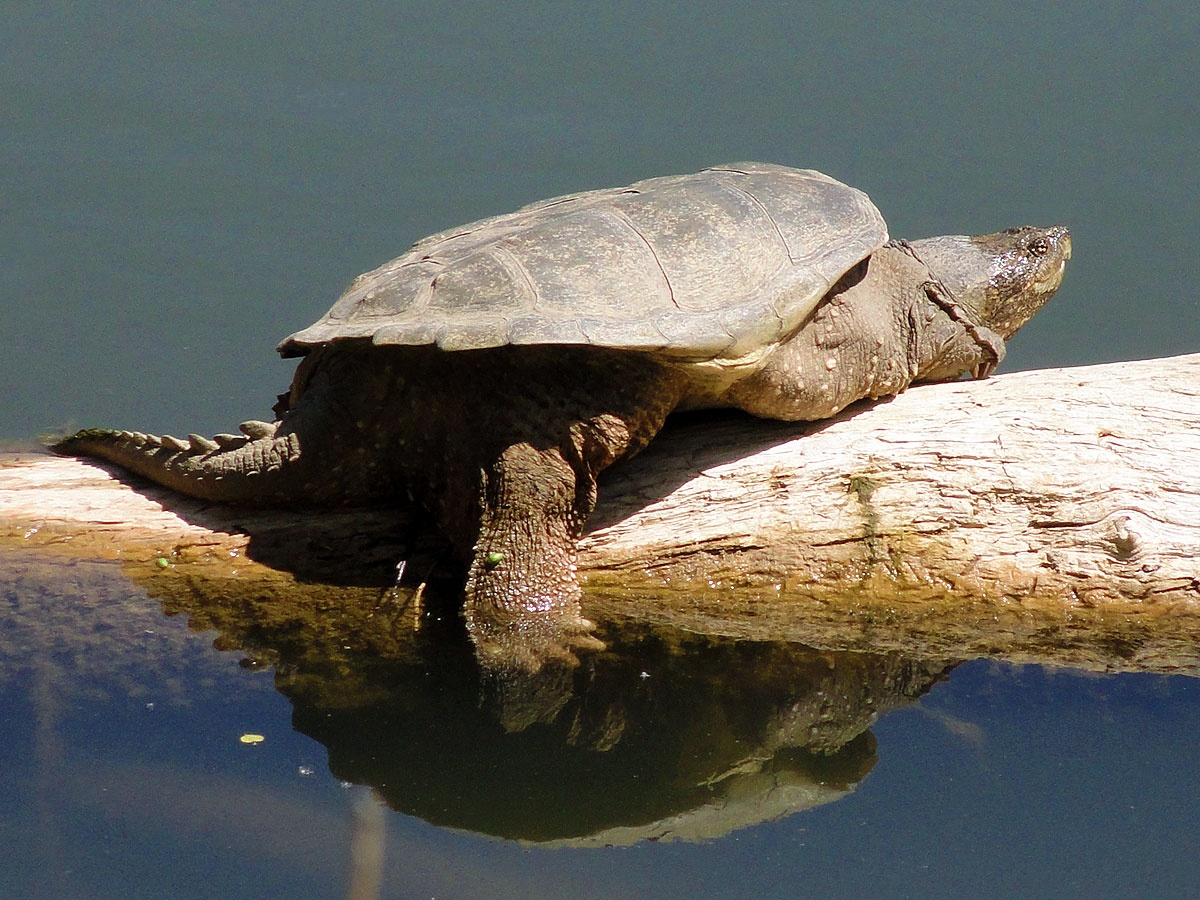
- Common snapping turtle (Chelydra serpentina)

Family Kinosternidae – mud and musk turtles

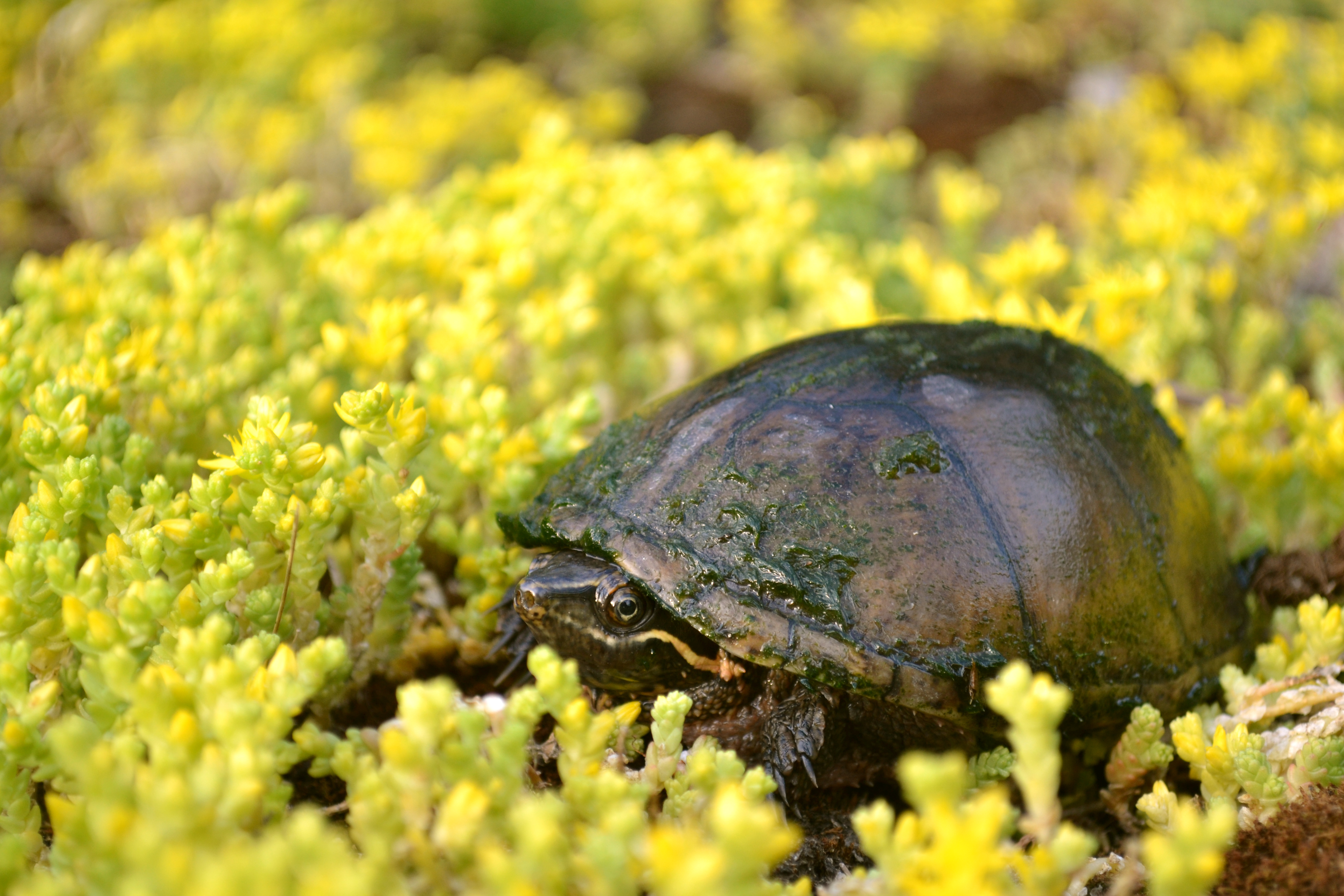
- Common musk turtle (stinkpot) (Sternotherus odoratus)
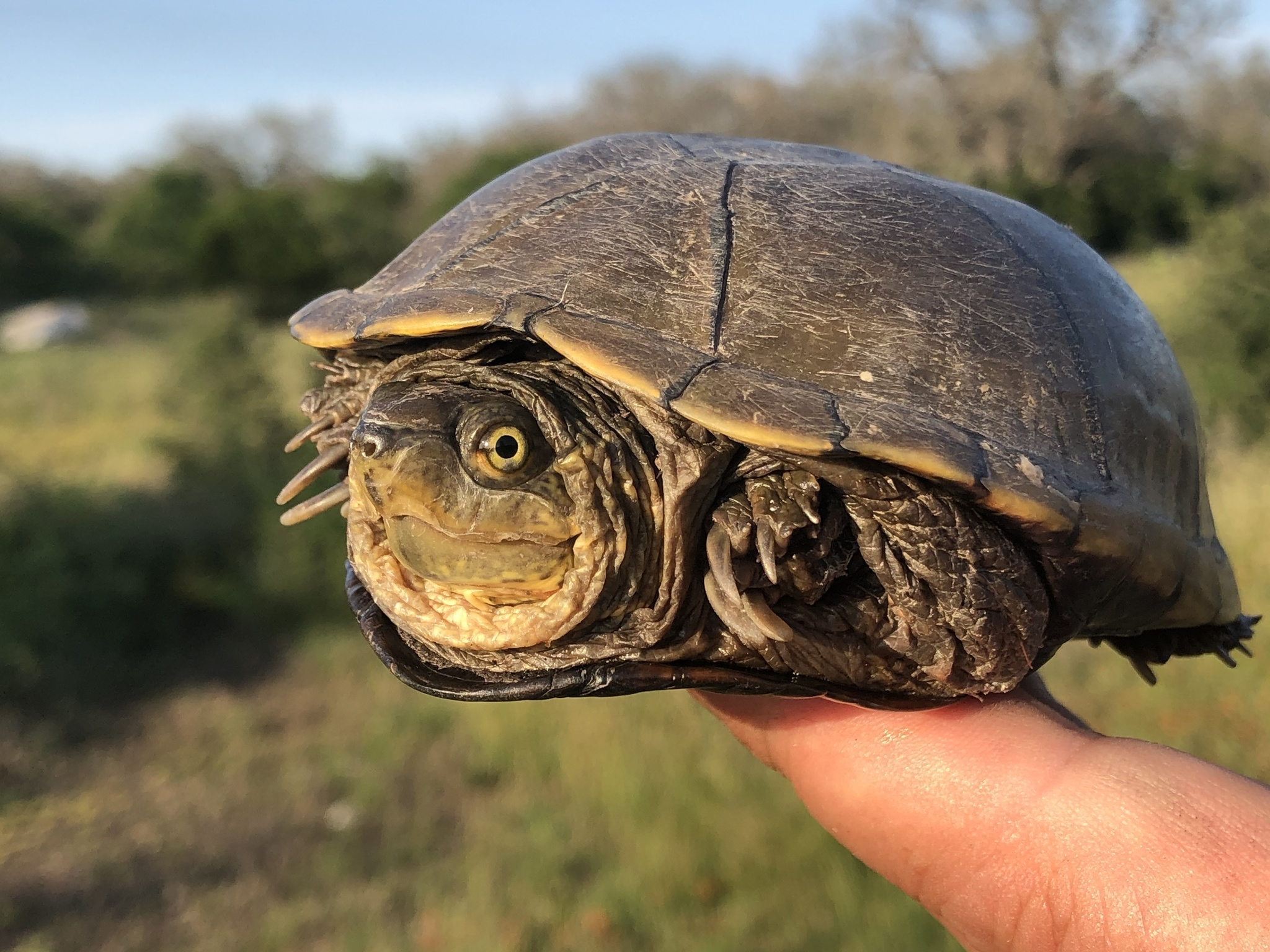
- Yellow mud turtle (Kinosternon flavescens)

Family Emydidae – basking and box turtles

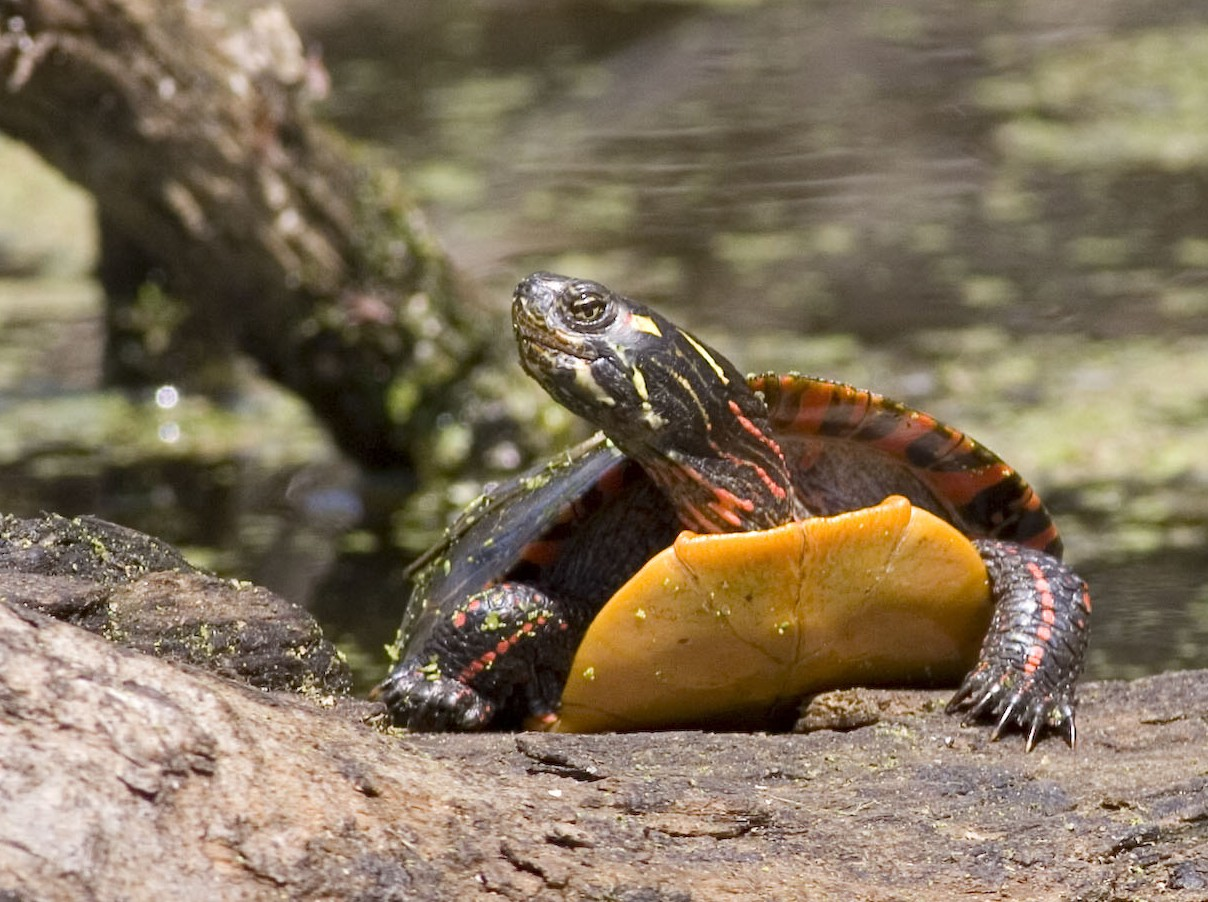
- Painted turtle (Chrysemys picta)
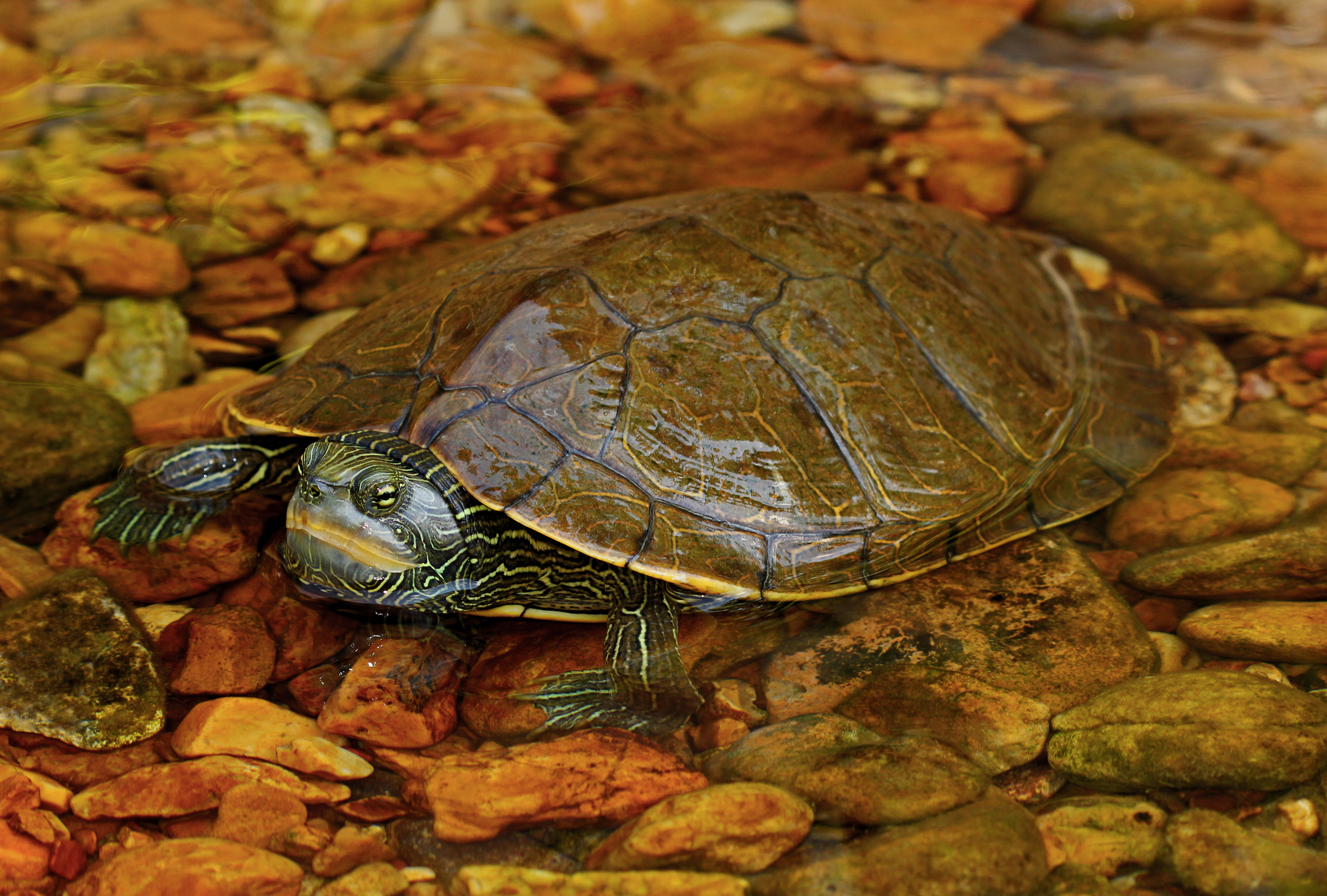
- Common map turtle (Graptemys geographica)
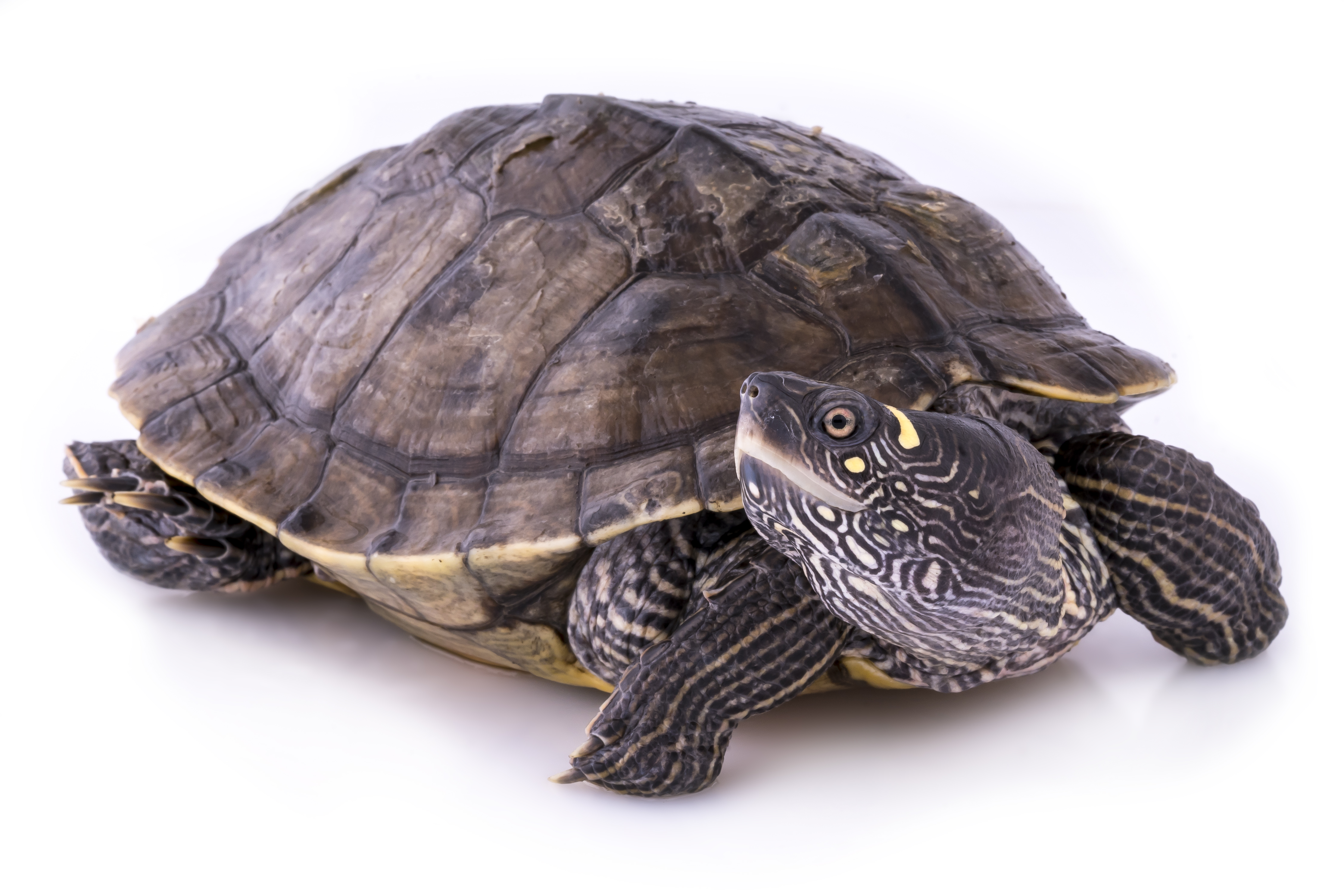
- Ouachita map turtle (Graptemys ouachitensis)
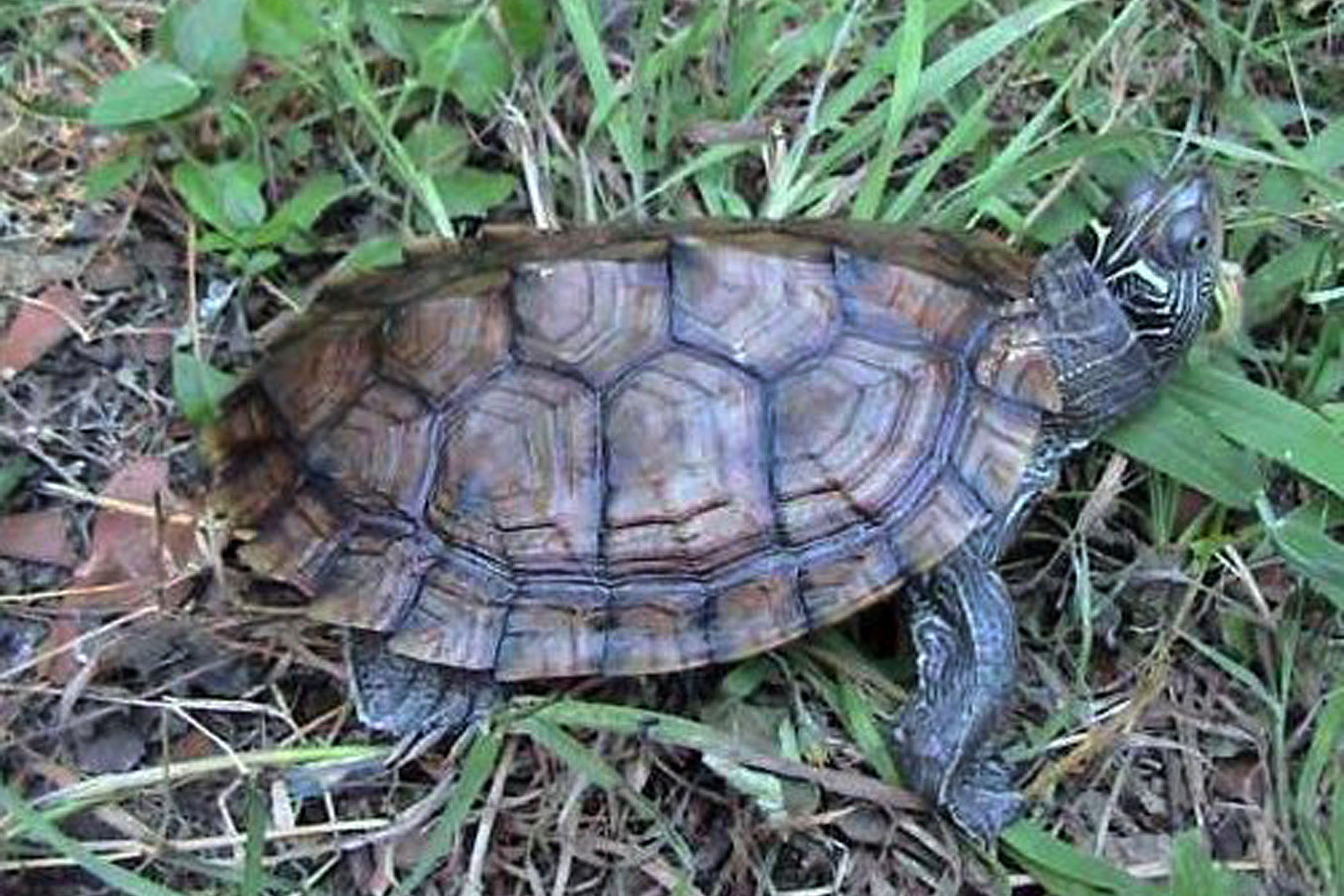
- False map turtle (Graptemys pseudogeographica)
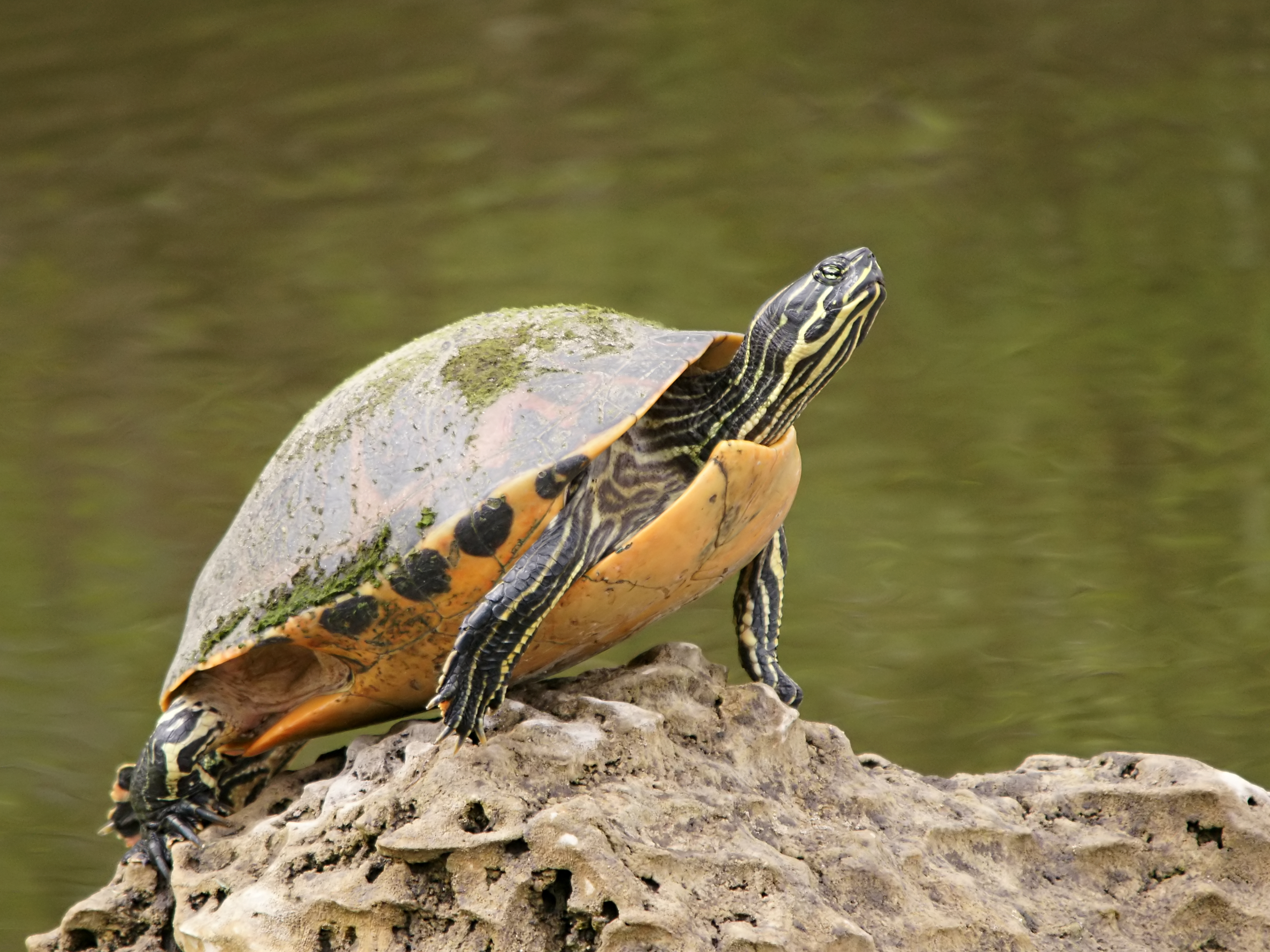
- River cooter (Pseudemys concinna)
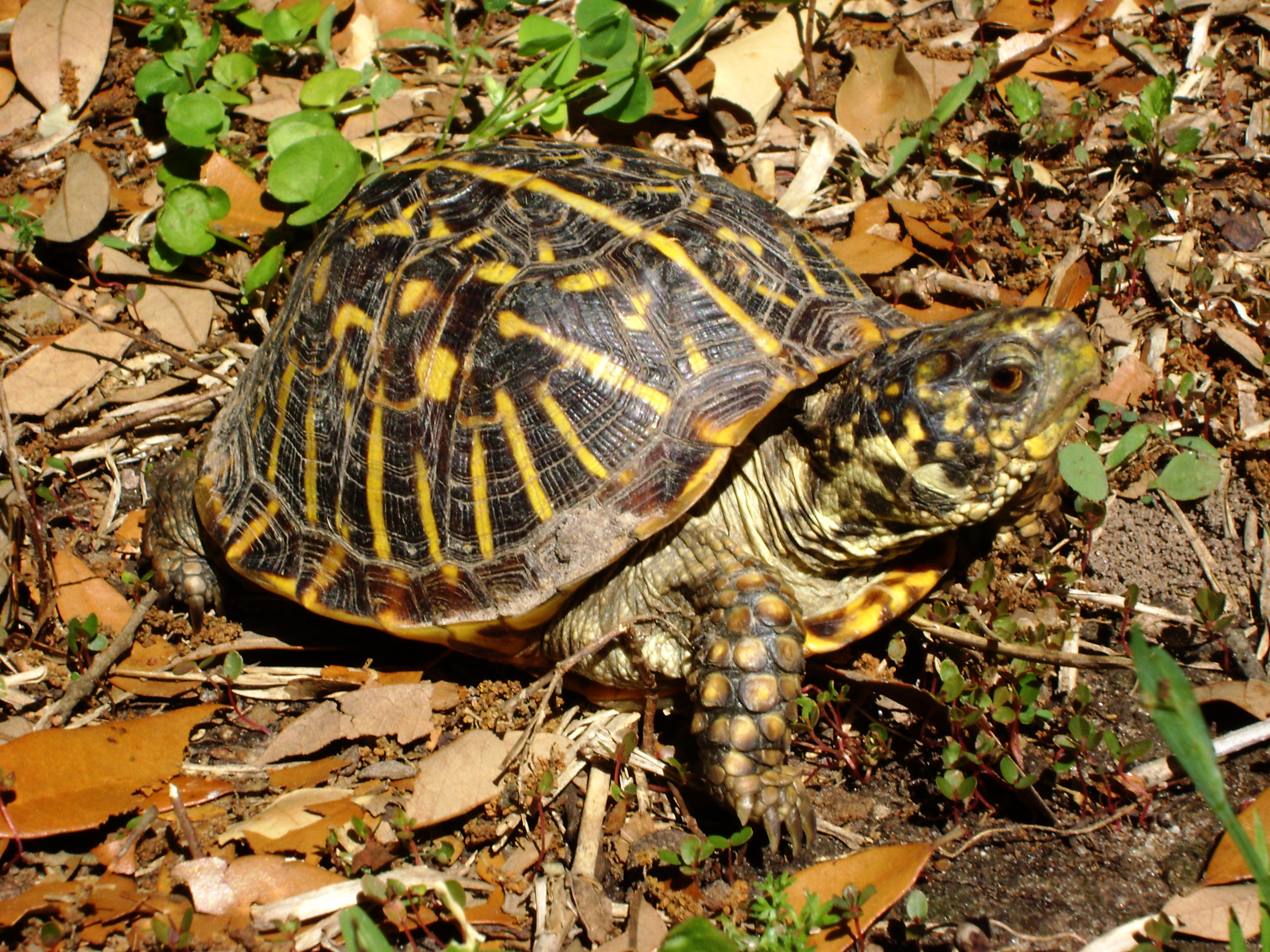
- Ornate box turtle (Terrapene ornata)
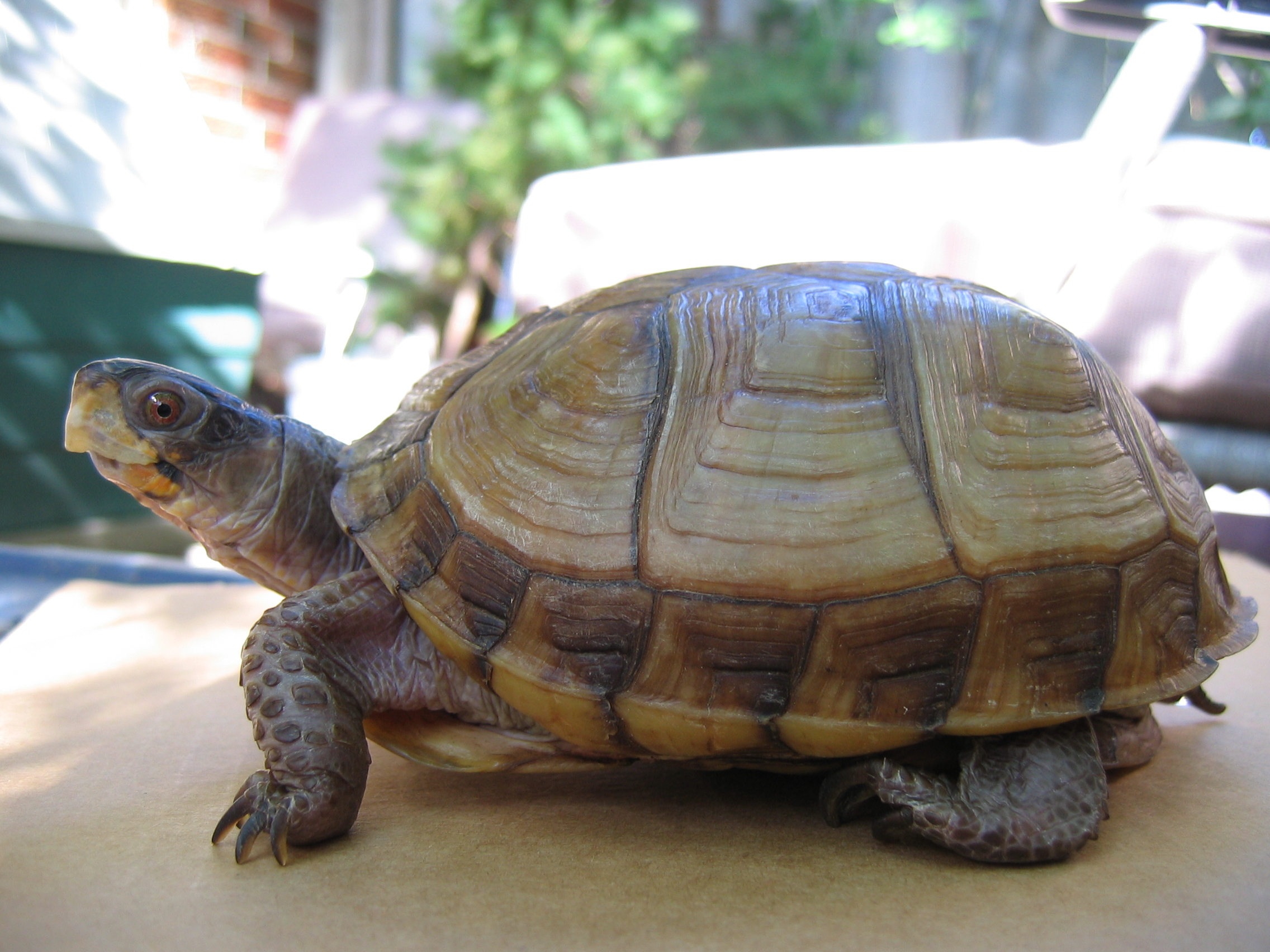
- Three-toed box turtle (Terrapene triunguis)
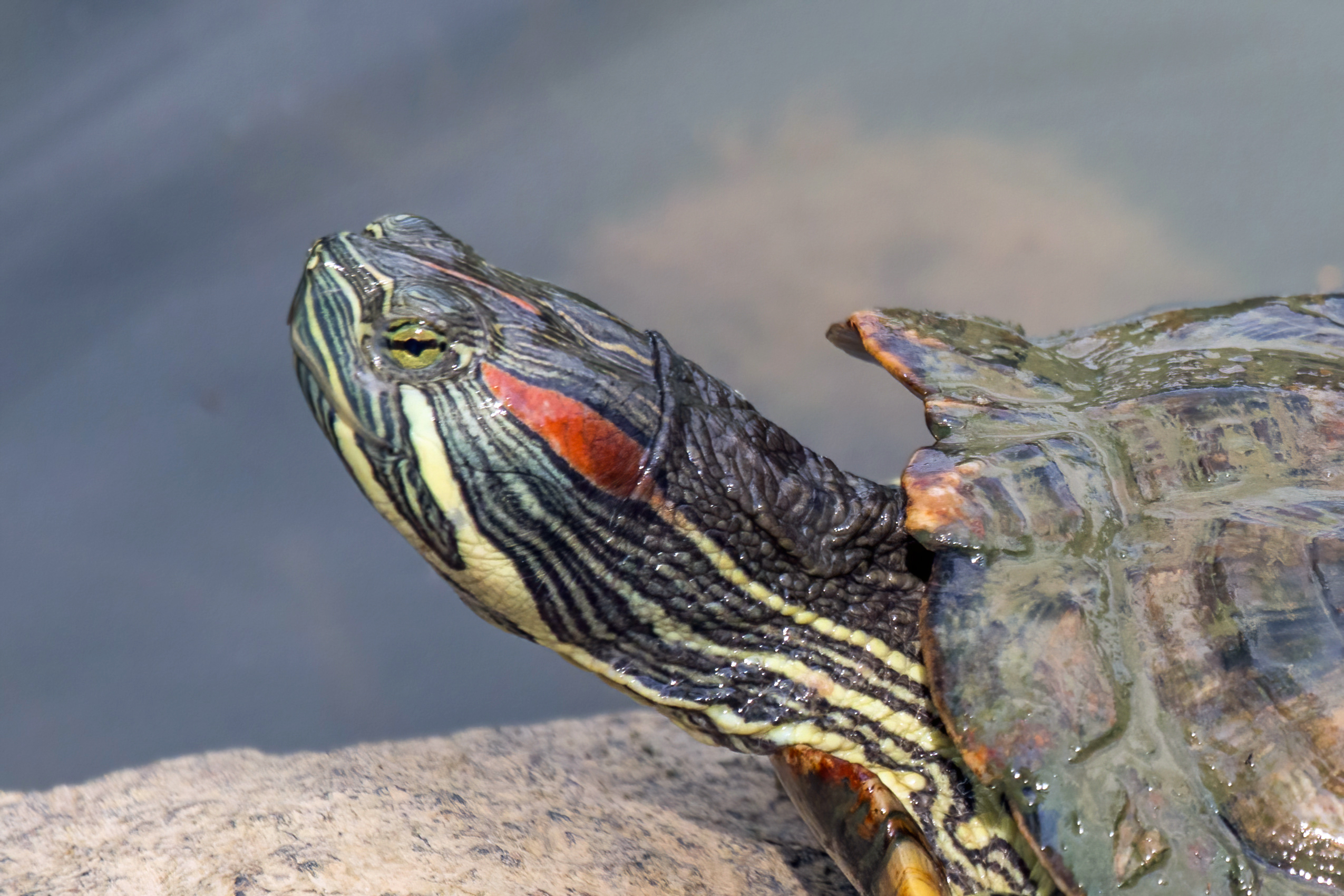
- Pond slider (Trachemys scripta)

Family Trionychidae – softshell turtles

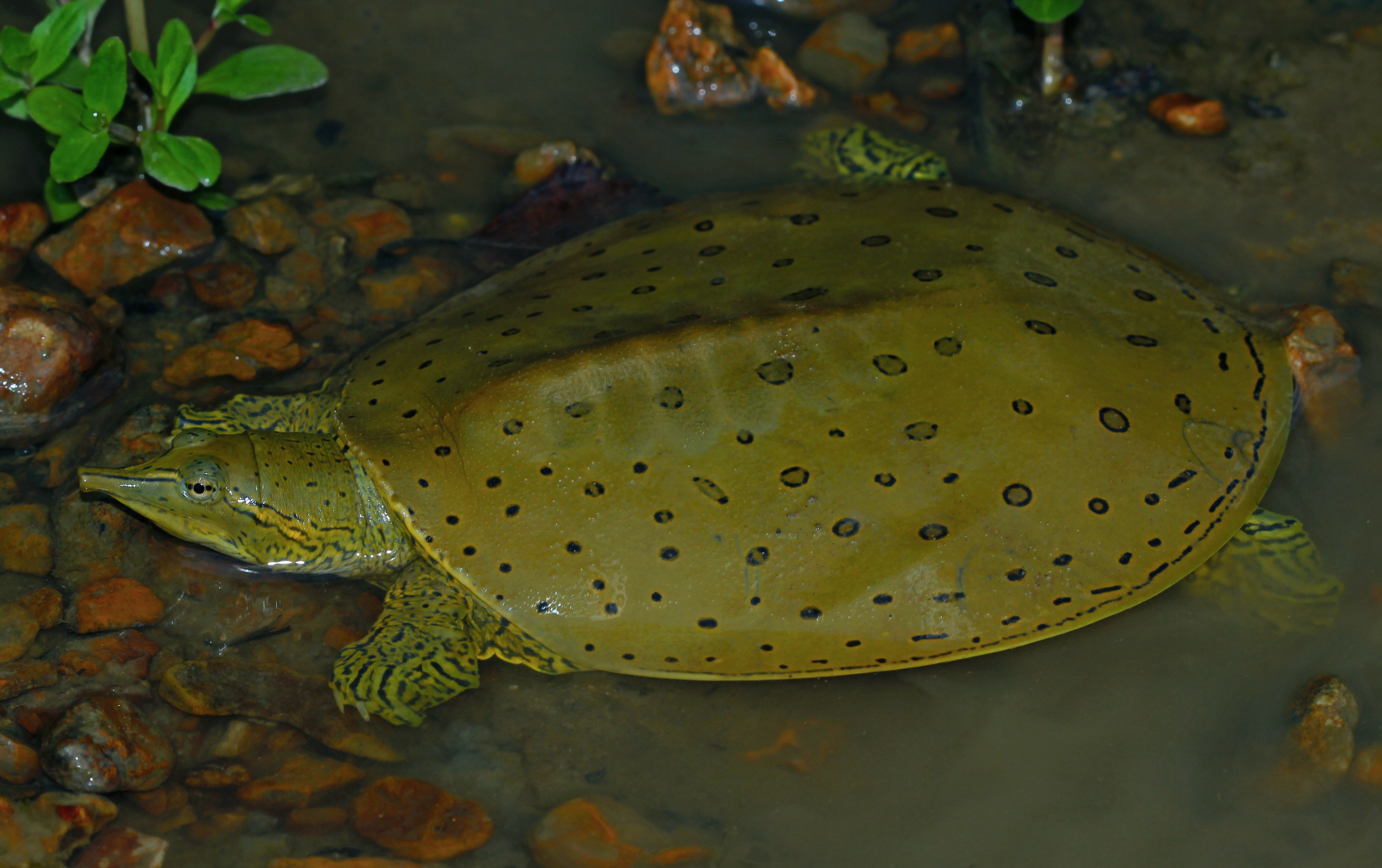
- Spiny softshell turtle (Apalone spinifera)
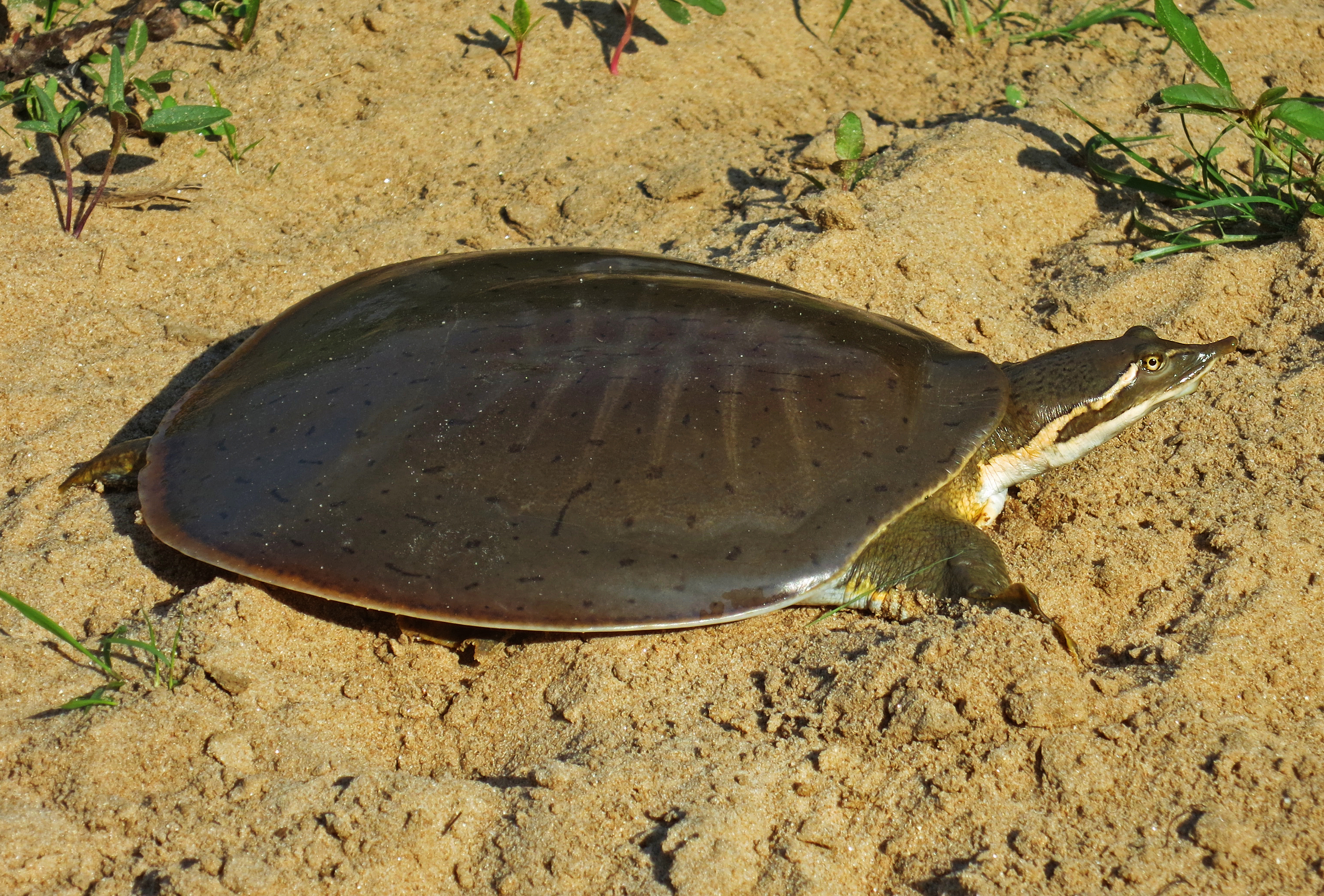
- Smooth softshell turtle (Apalone mutica)

== Lizards ==
There are 16 species of lizards in Kansas.

Anguidae – lateral fold lizards

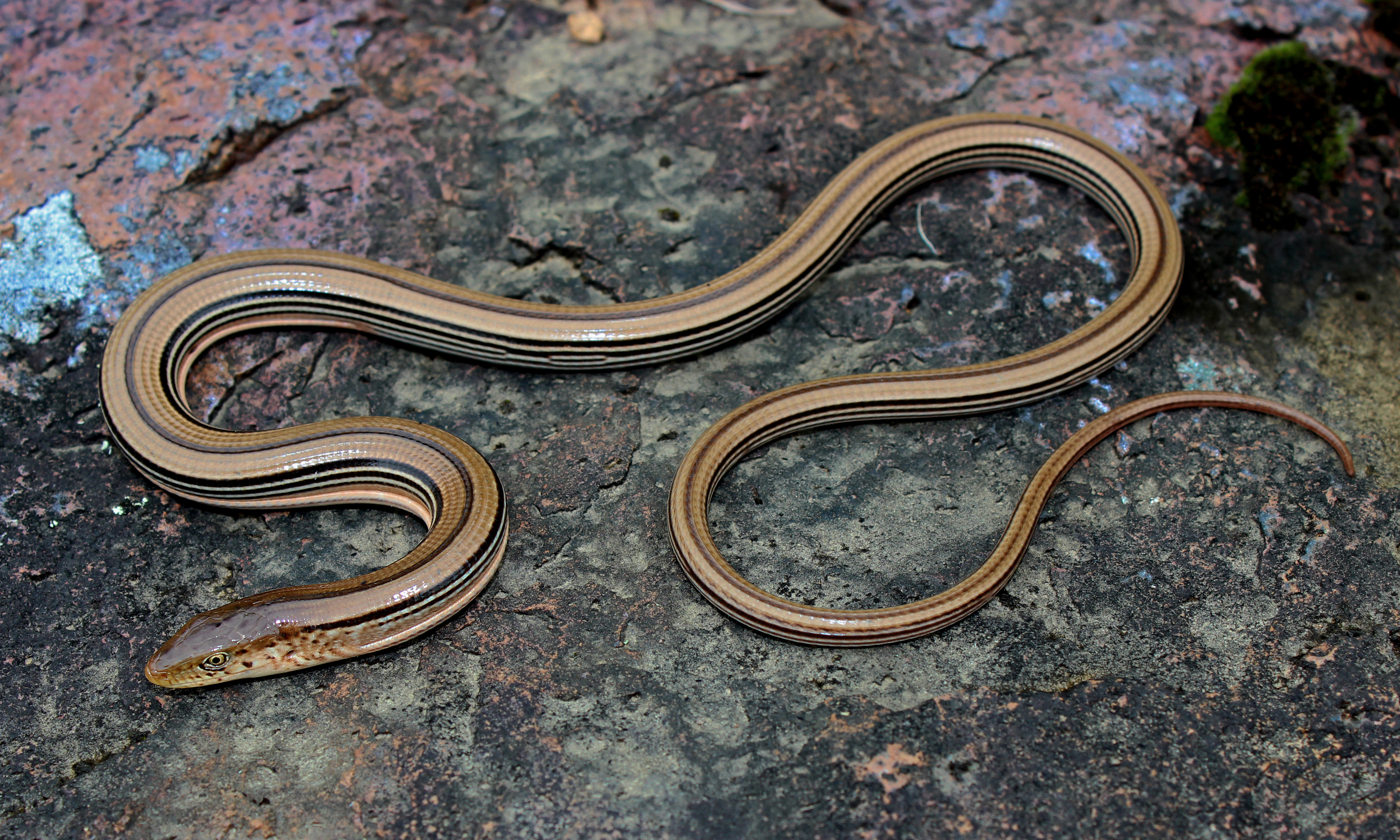
- Slender glass lizard (Ophisaurus attenuatus)

Crotaphytidae – collared and leopard lizards

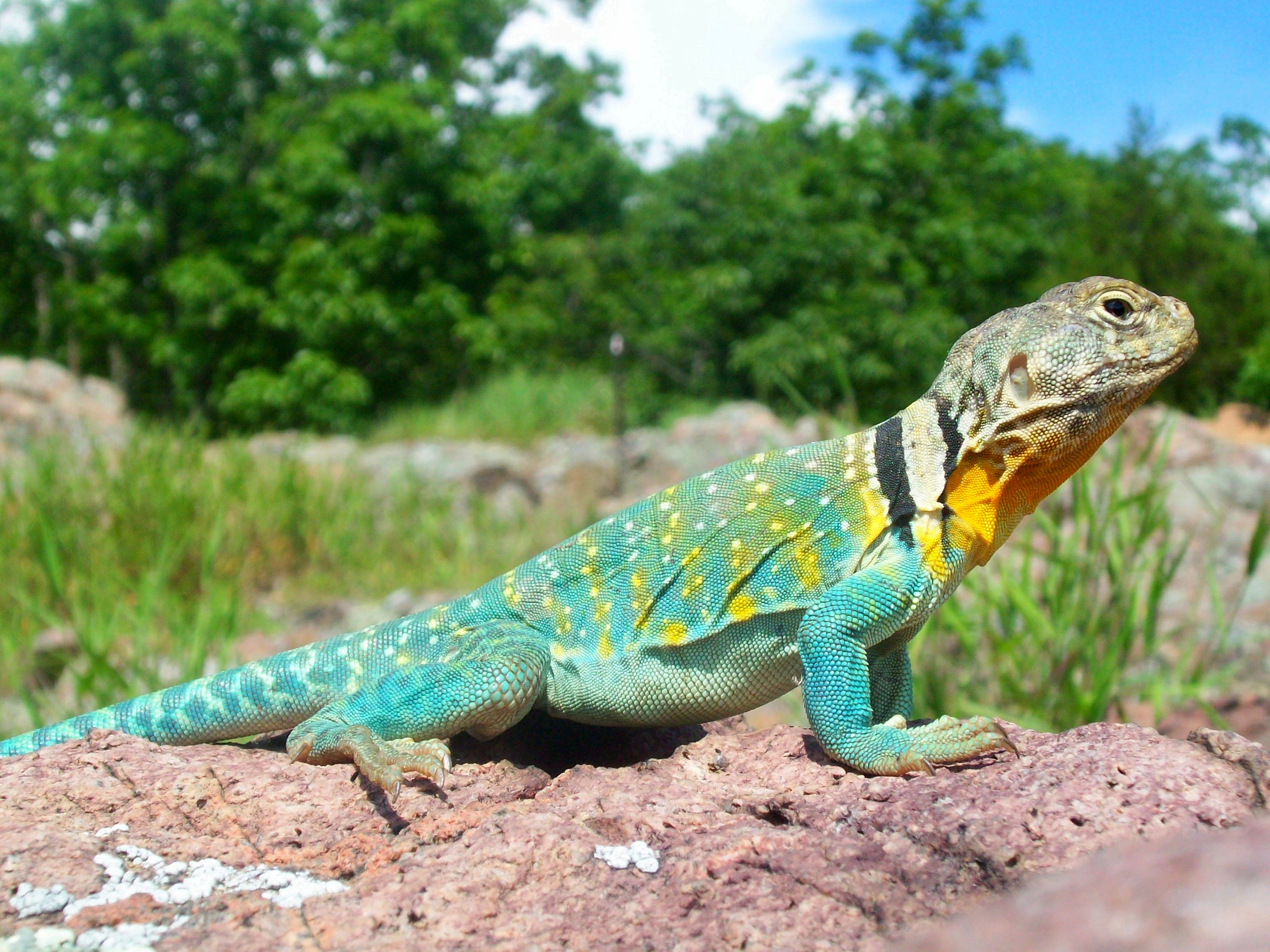
- Eastern collared lizard (Crotaphytus collaris)

Gekkonidae – geckos

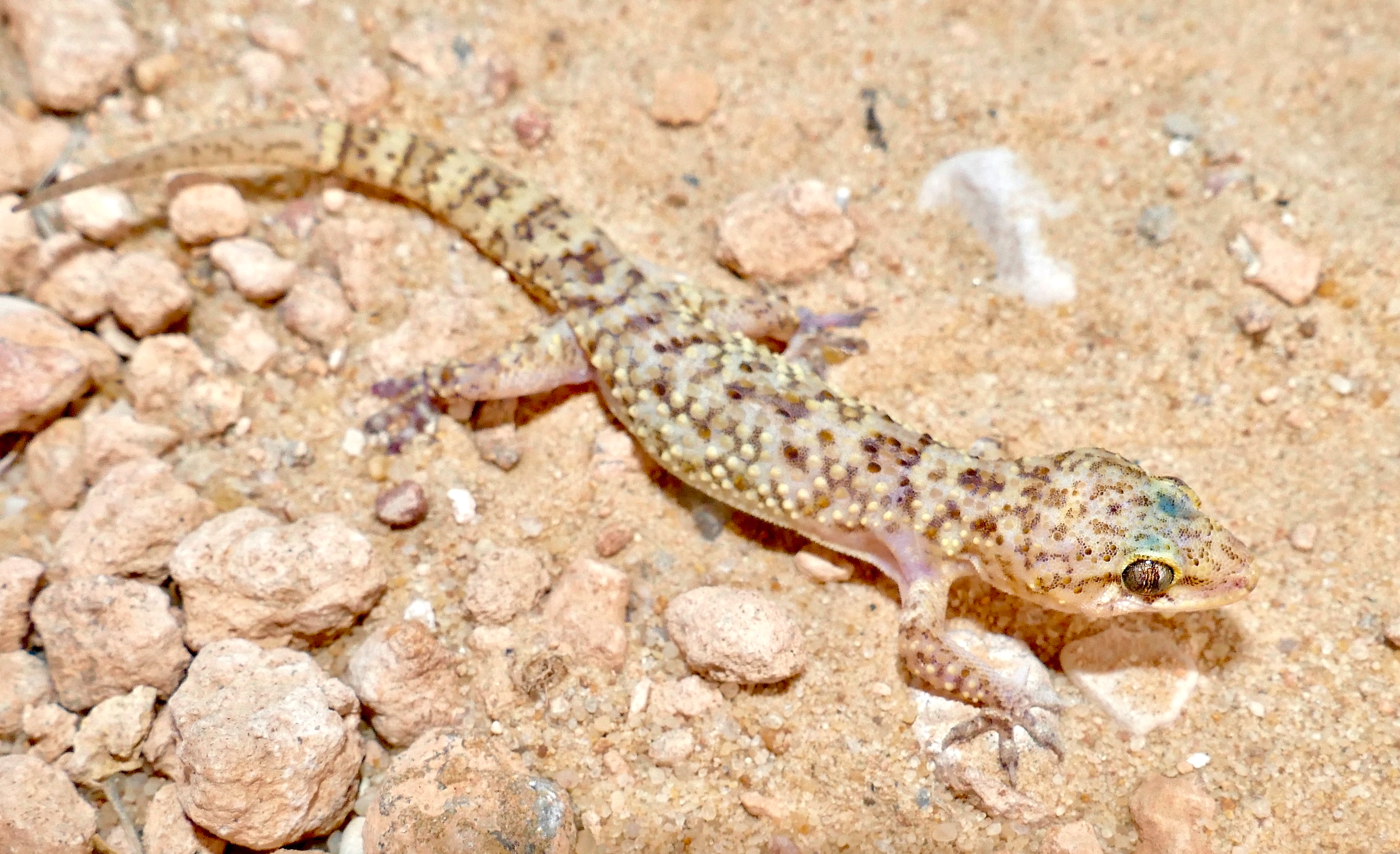
- Mediterranean gecko (introduced) (Hemidactylus turcicus)

Lacertidae – Lacertas (wall and true lizards)

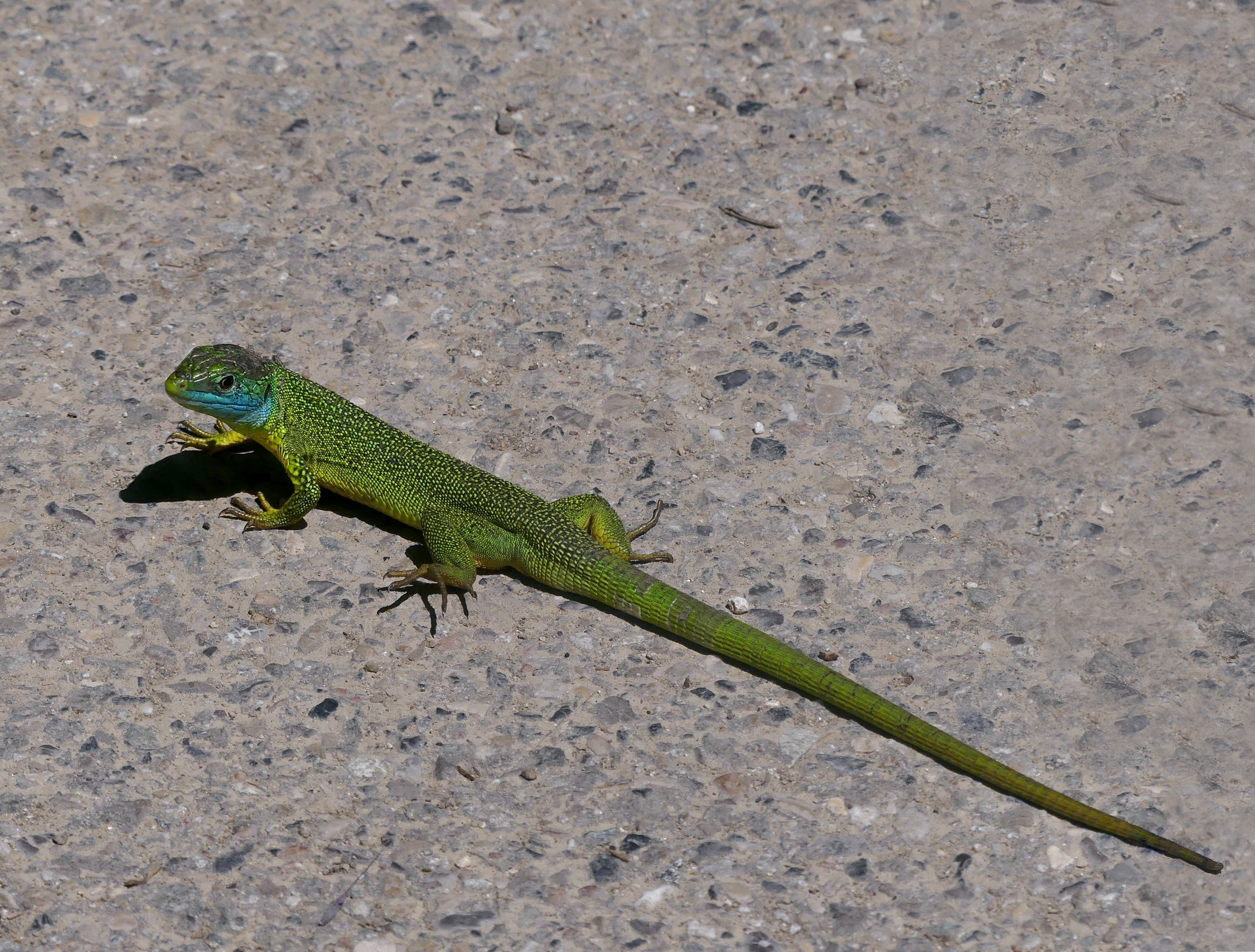
- Western green lizard (introduced) (Lacerta bilineata)
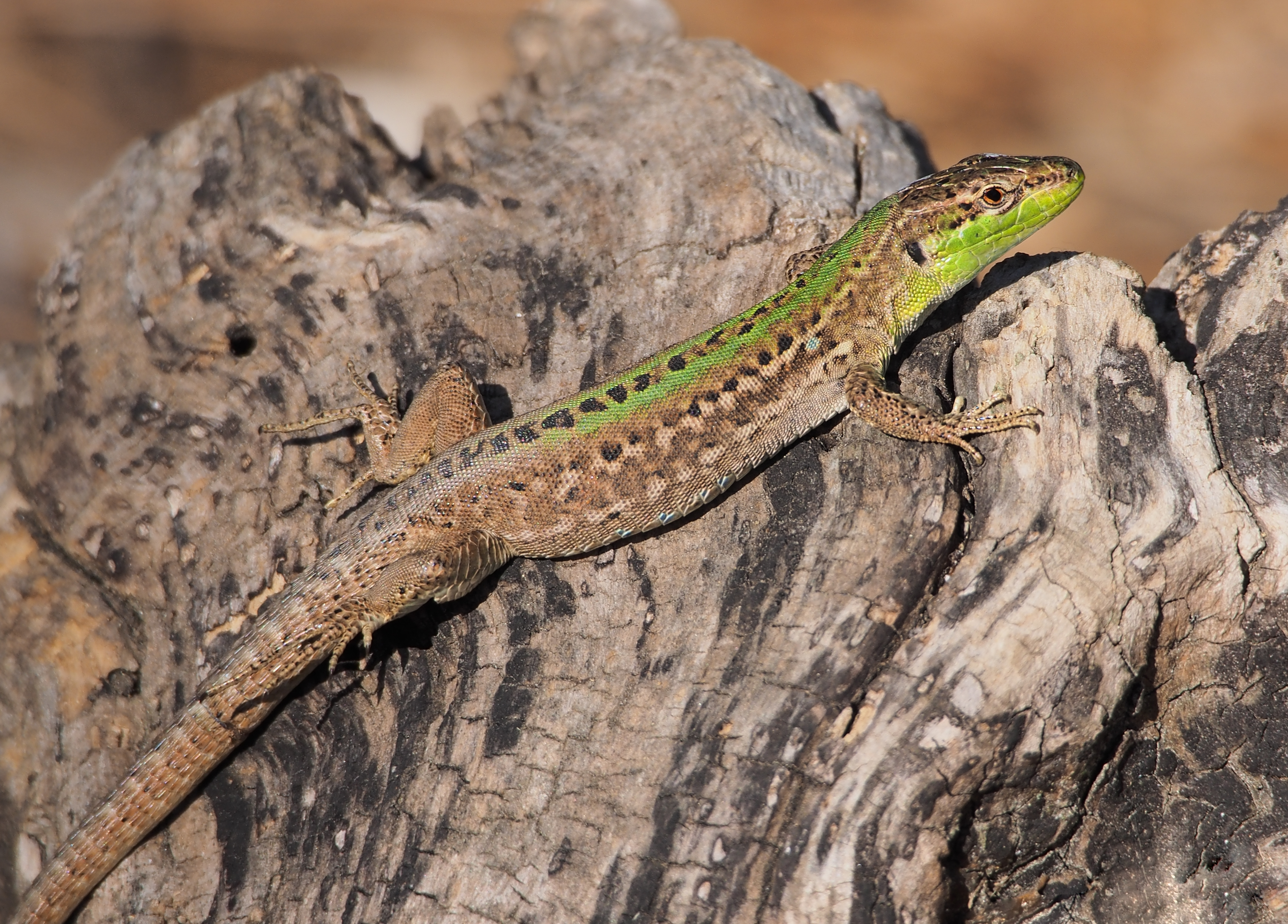
- Italian wall lizard (introduced) (Podarcis siculus)

Phrynosomatidae – spiny lizards

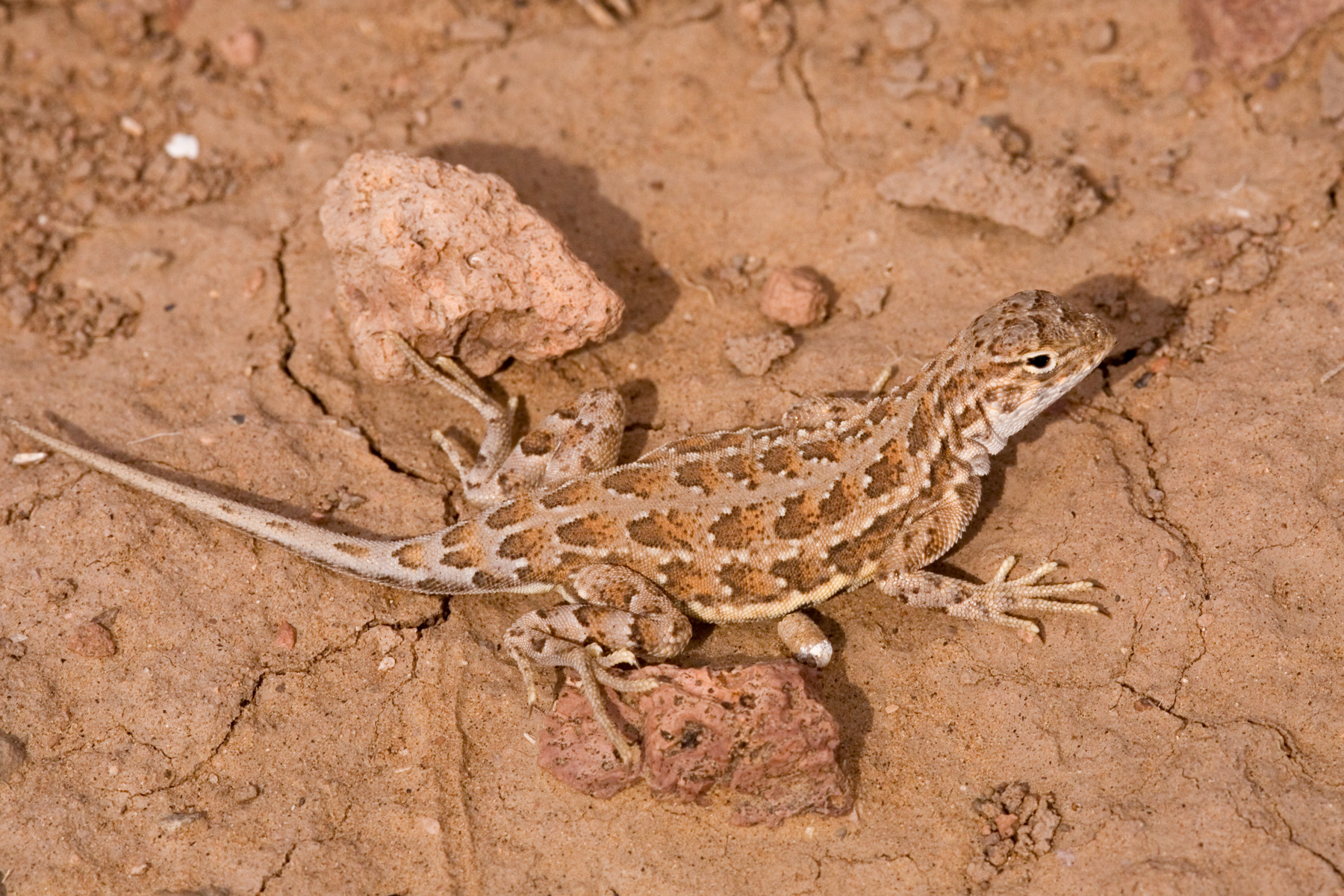
- Lesser earless lizard (Holbrookia maculata)
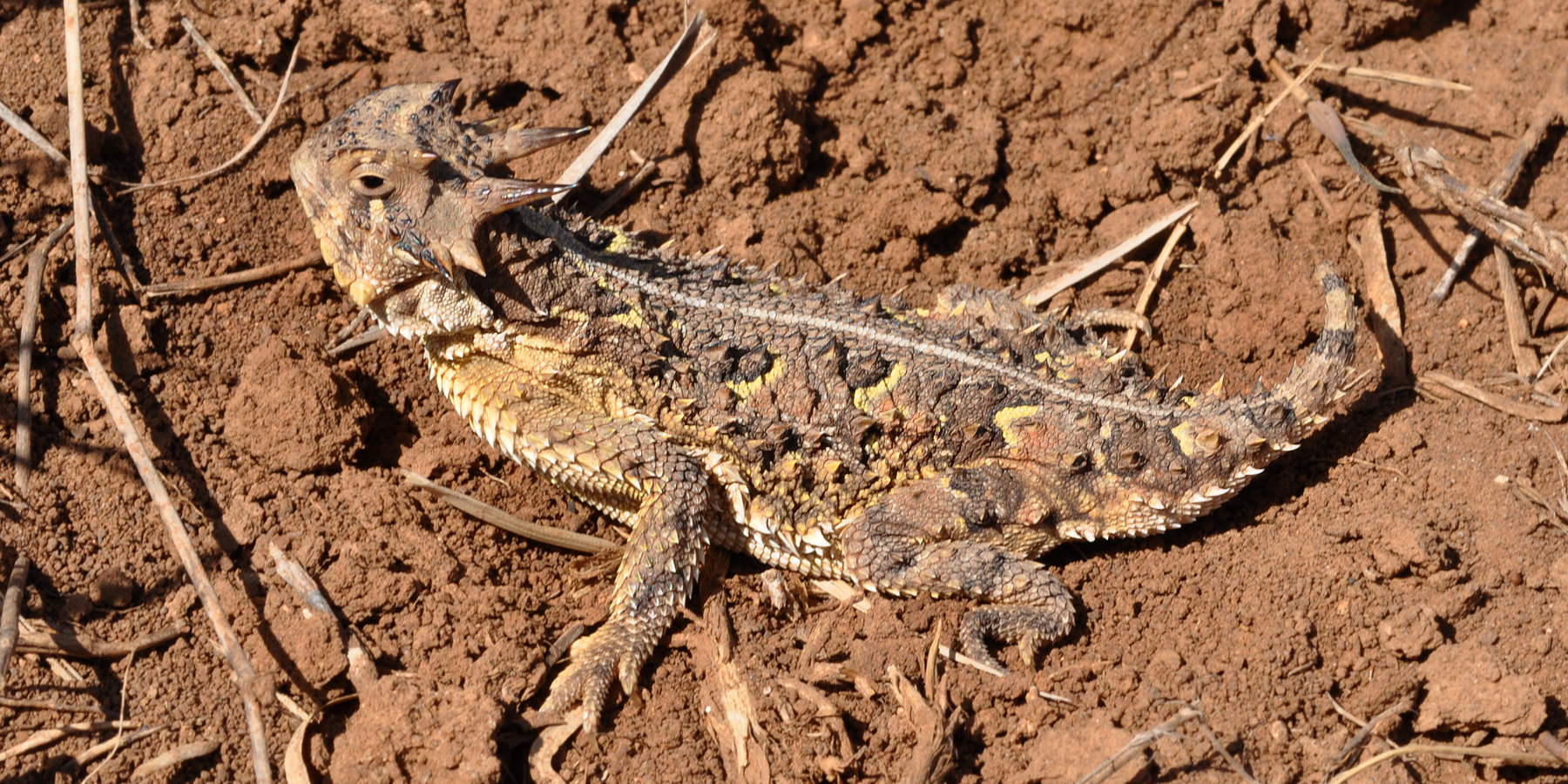
- Texas horned lizard (Phrynosoma cornutum)
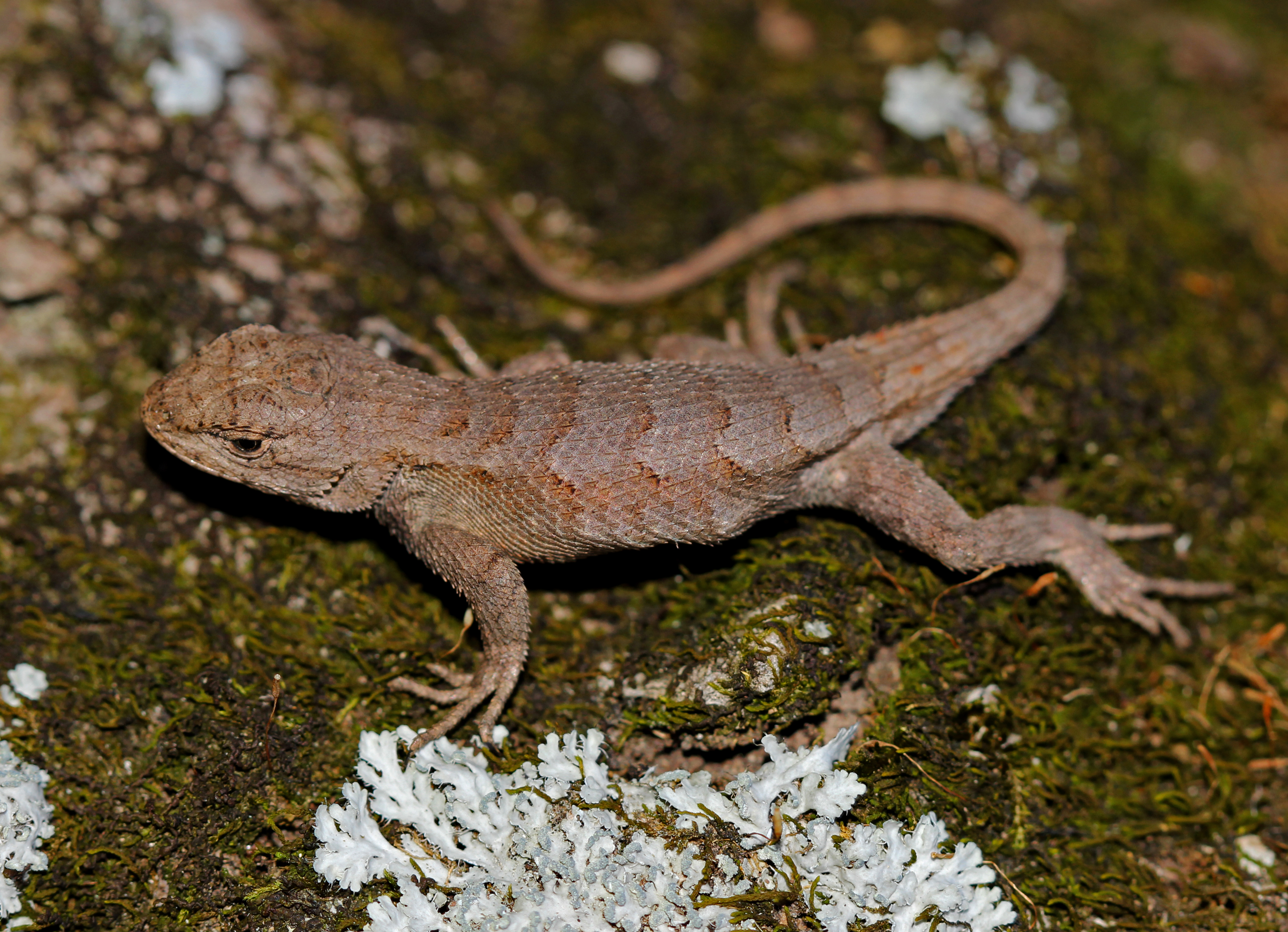
- Southern prairie lizard (Sceloporus consobrinus)

Scincidae – skinks

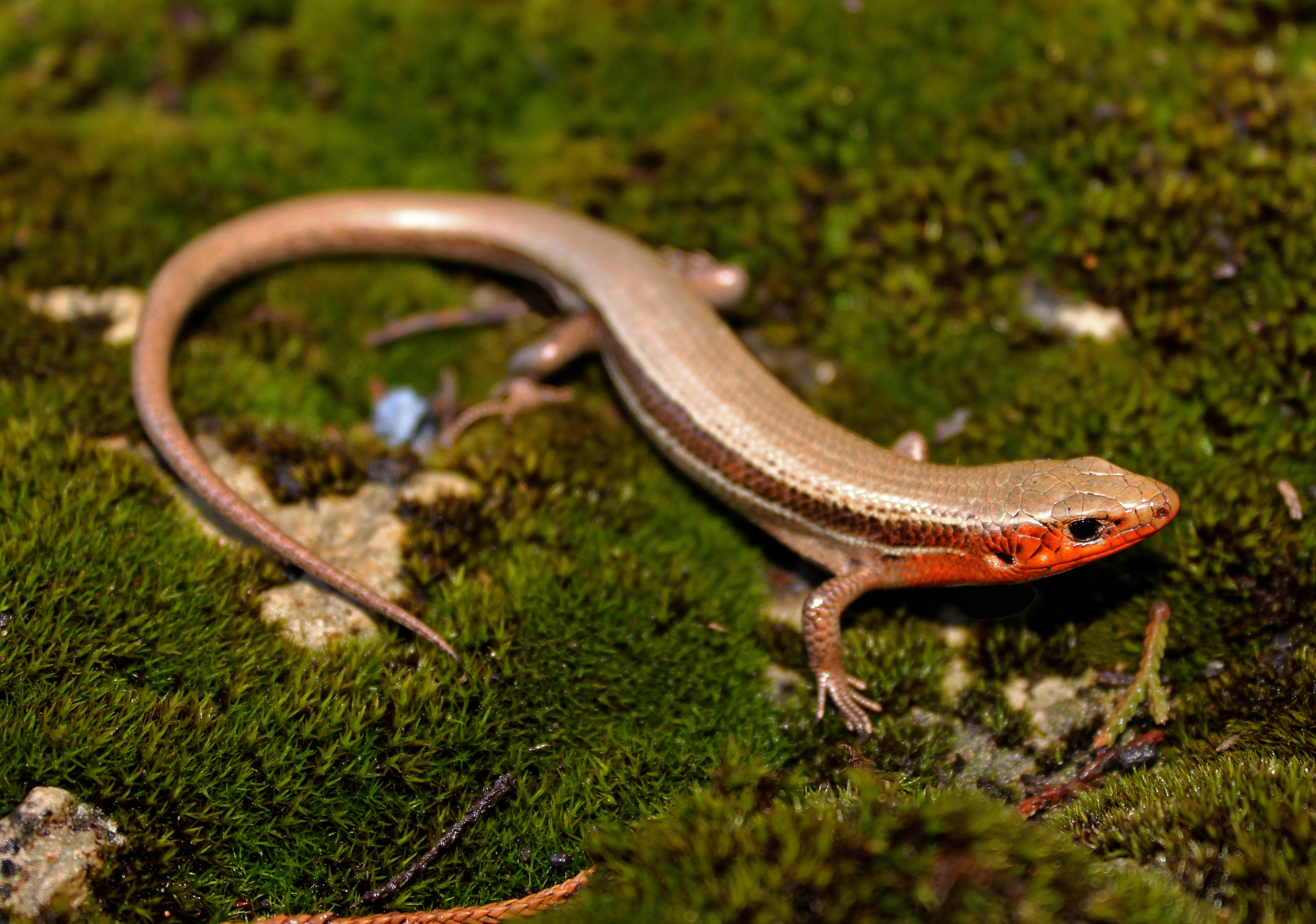
- Coal skink (Plestiodon anthracinus)
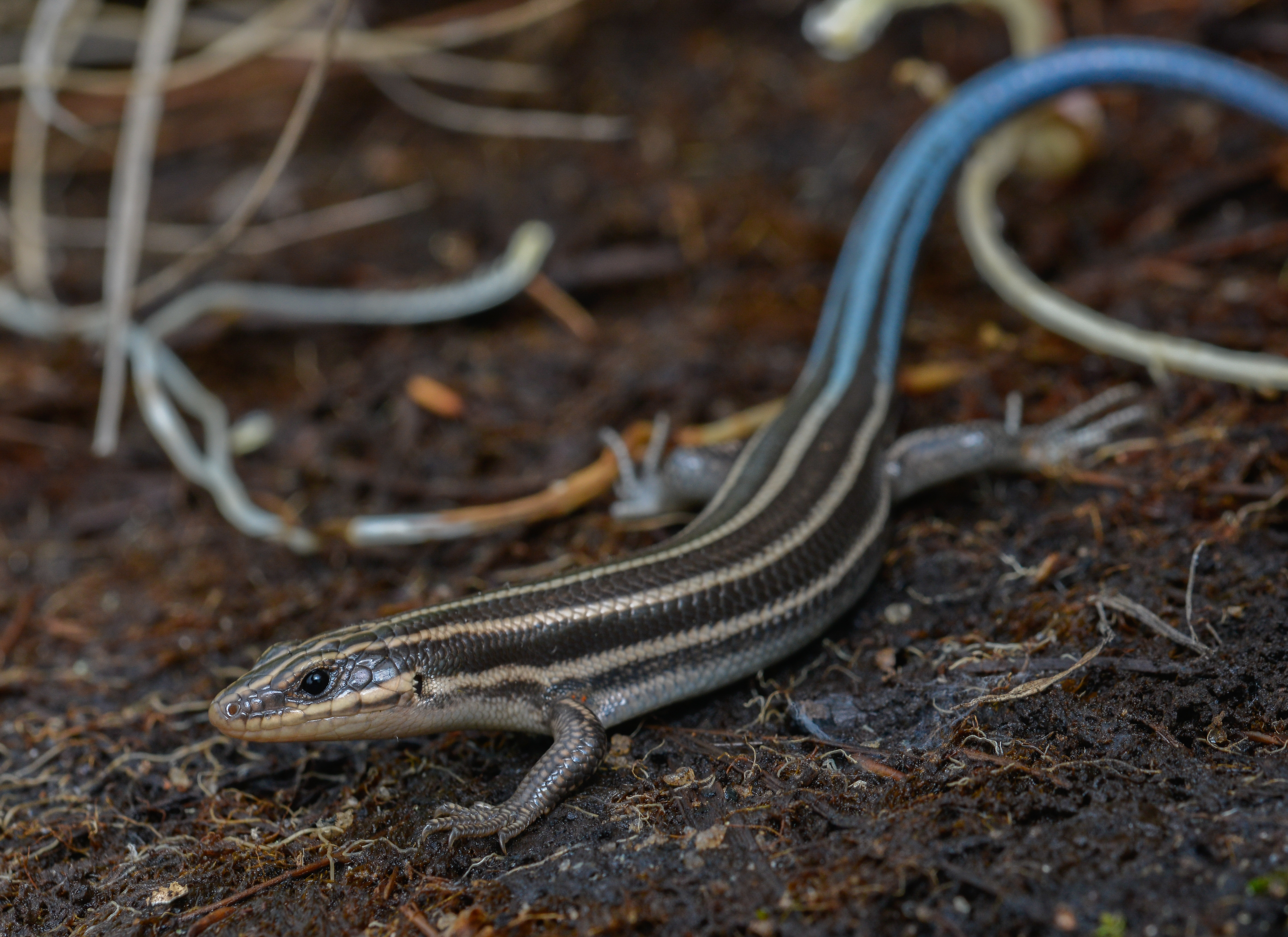
- Five-lined skink (Plestiodon fasciatus)
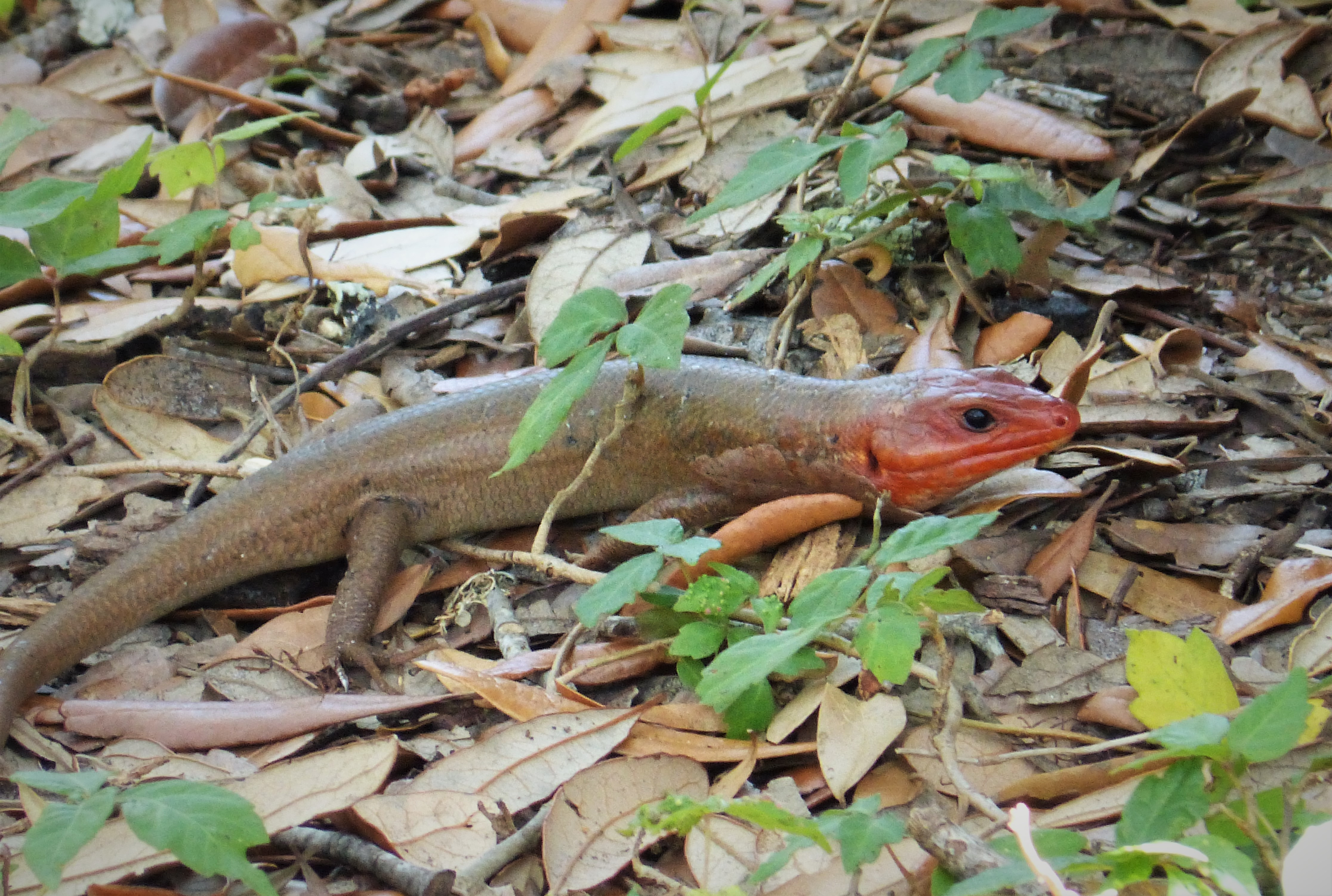
- Broadhead skink (Plestiodon laticeps)
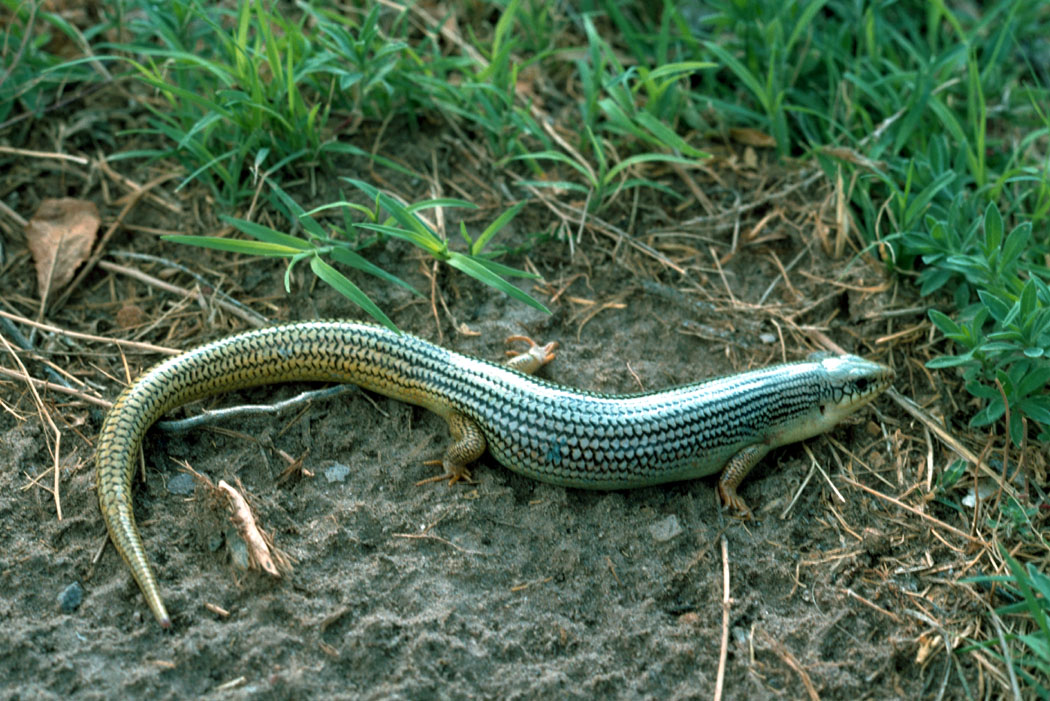
- Great Plains skink (Plestiodon obsoletus)
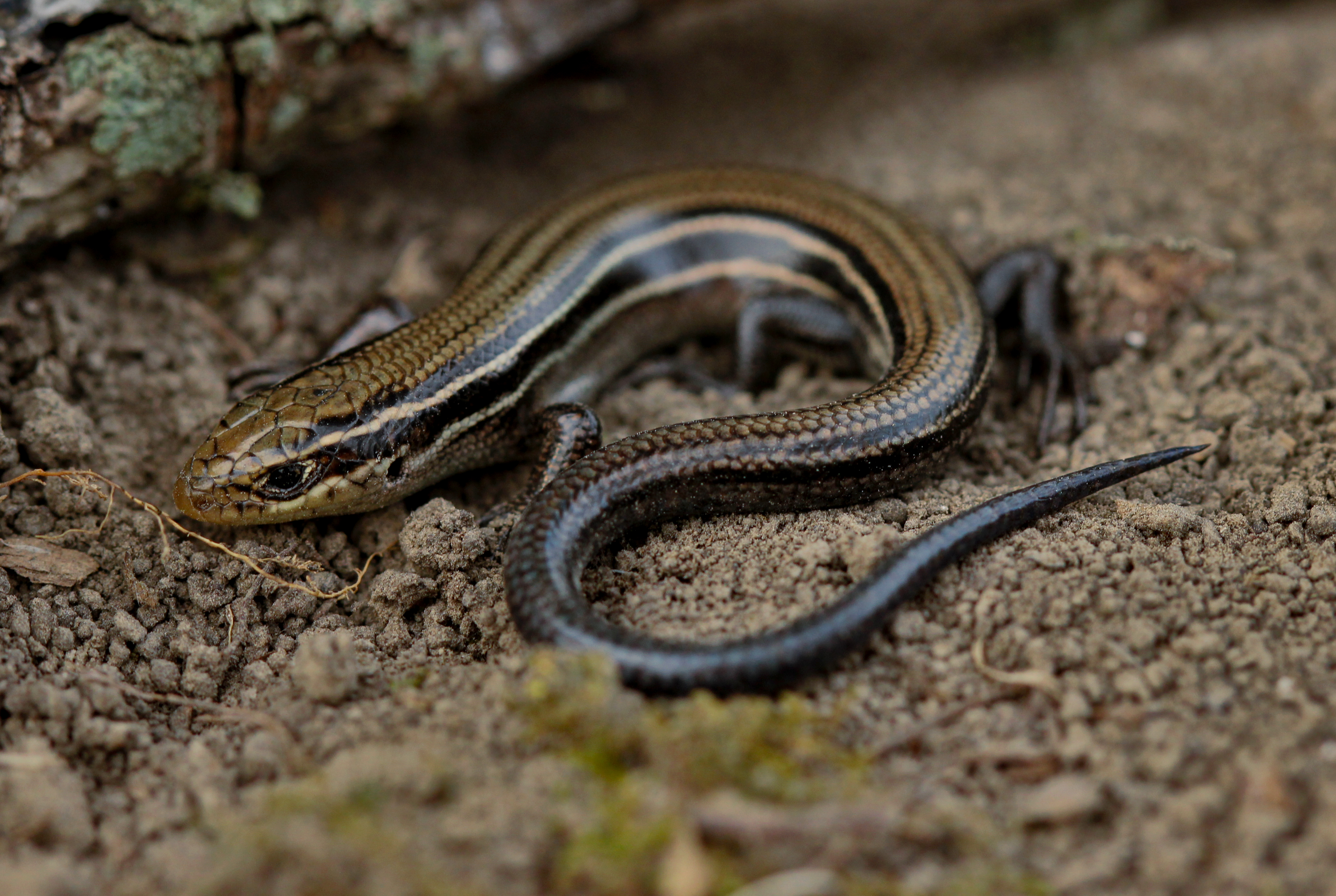
- Prairie skink (Plestiodon septentrionalis)
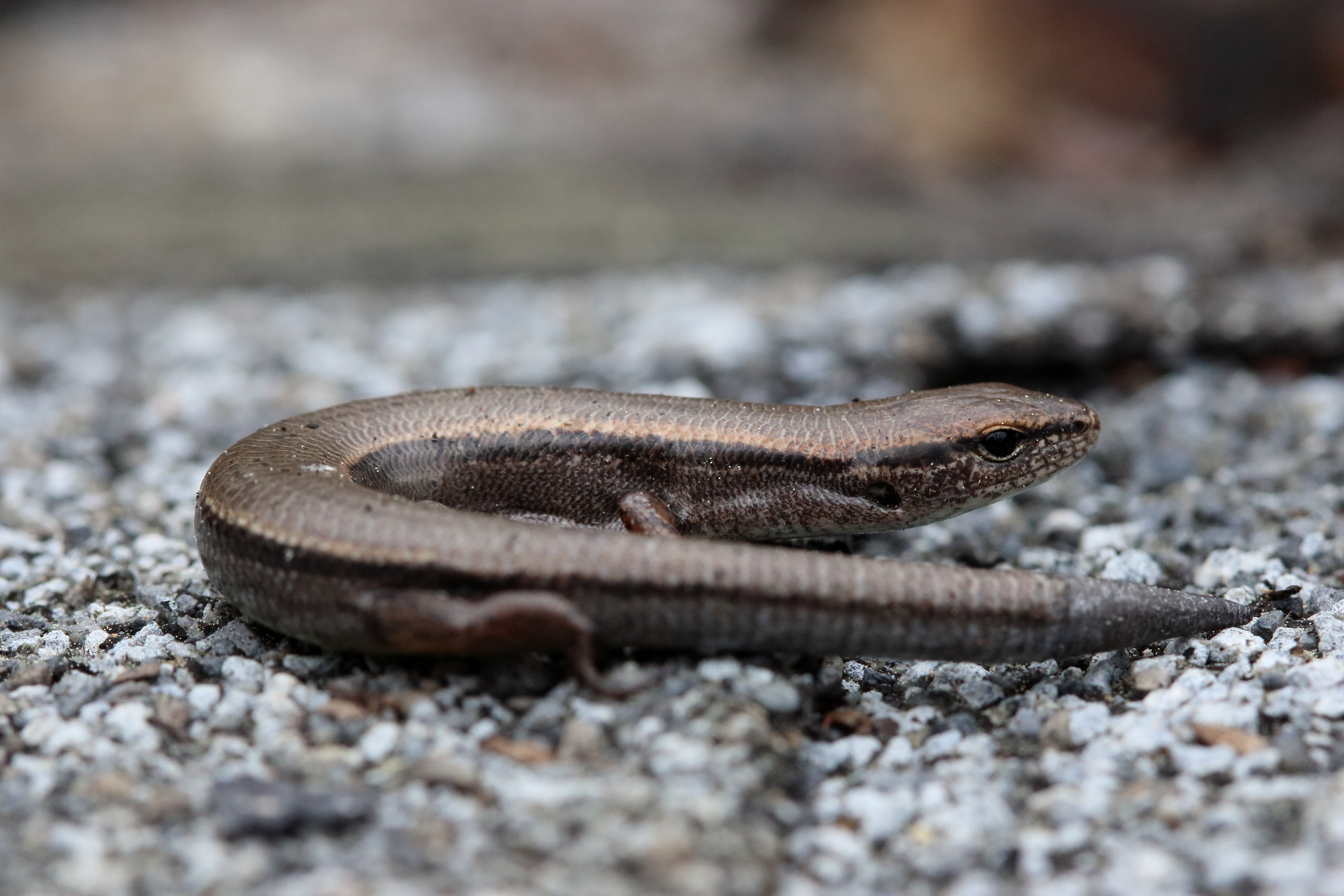
- Little brown skink (Scincella lateralis)

Teiidae – whiptails

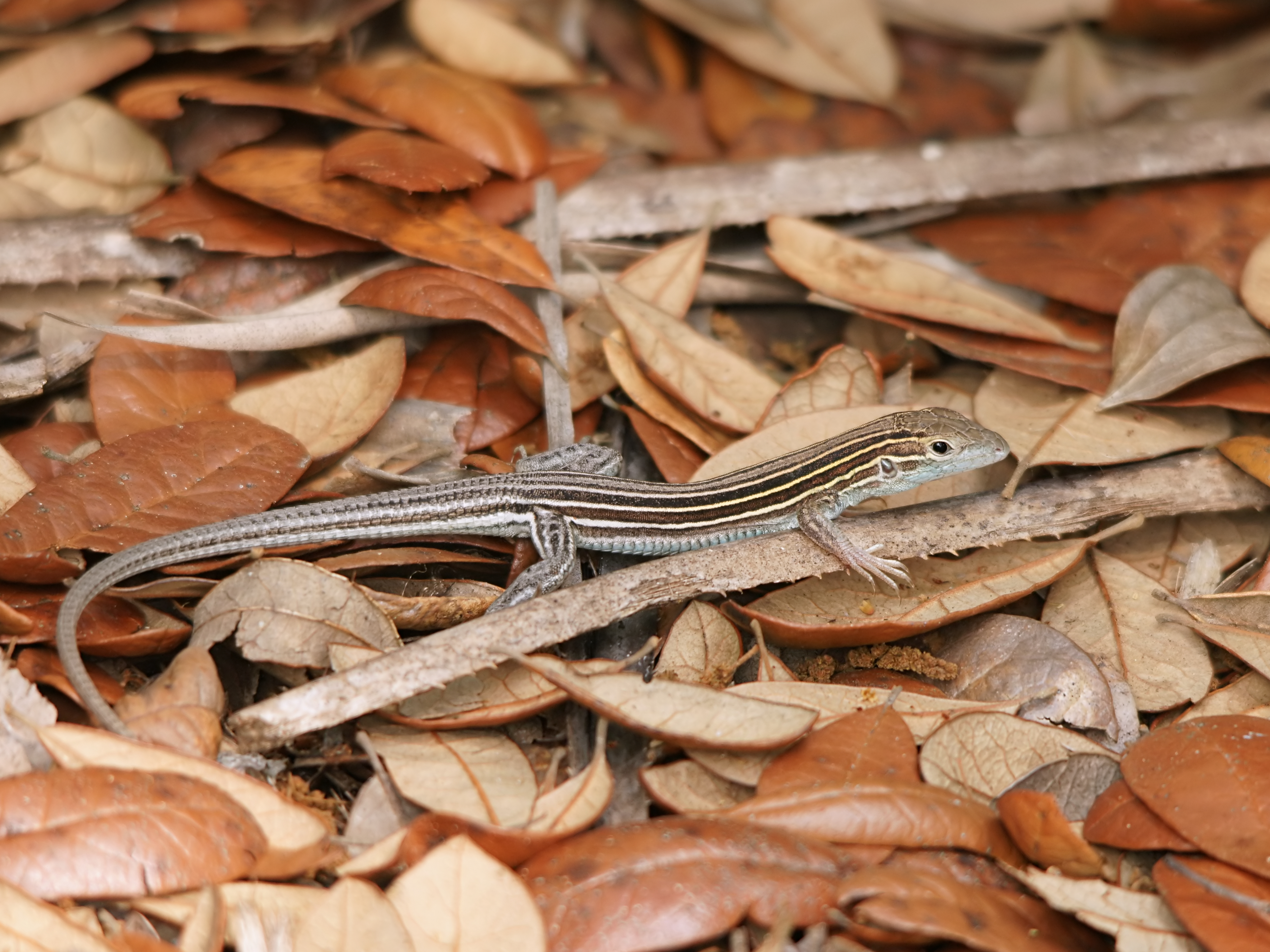
- Six-lined racerunner (Aspidoscelis sexlineatus)

== Venomous species ==
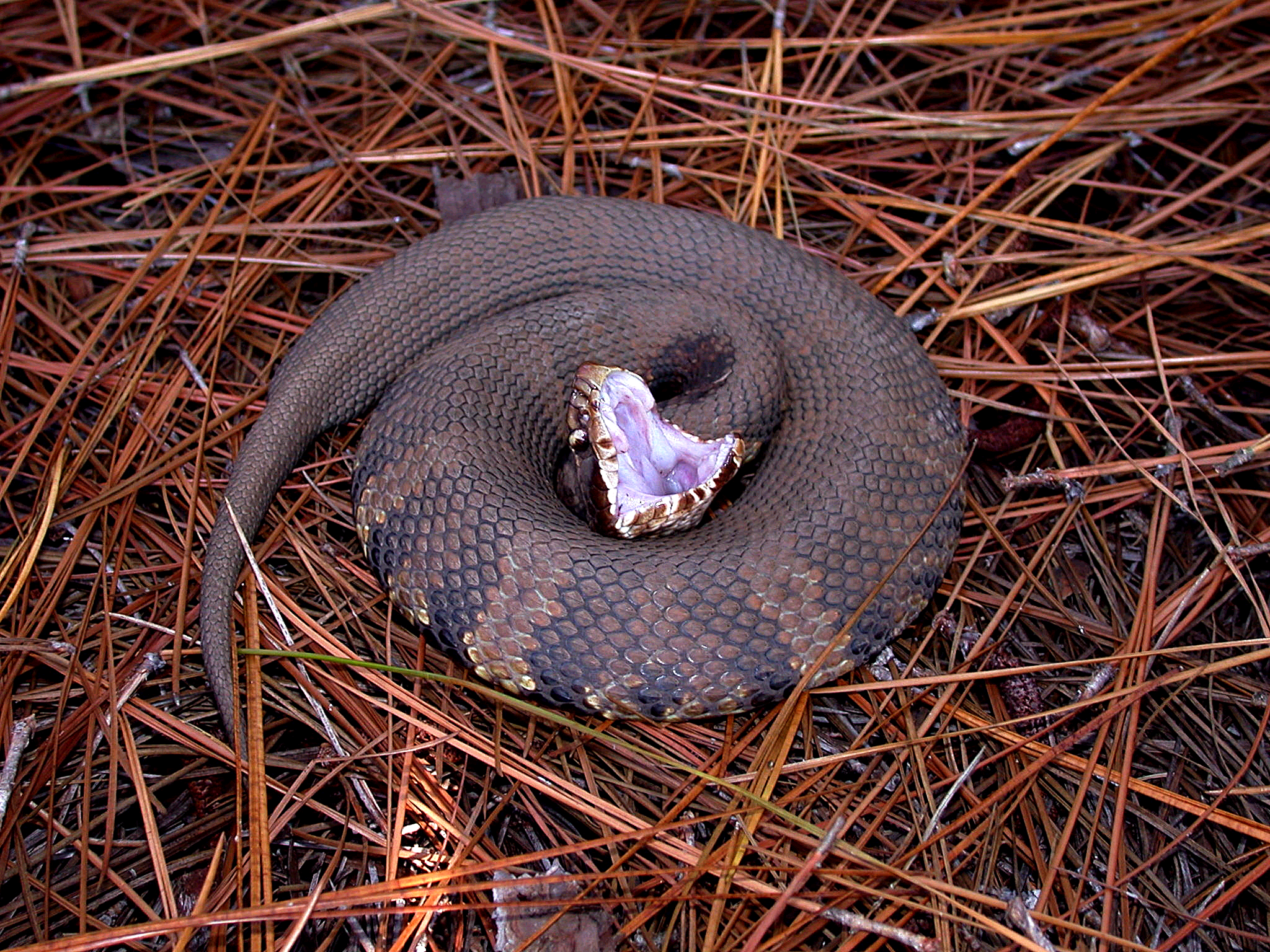
- Cottonmouth (Agkistrodon piscivorus)
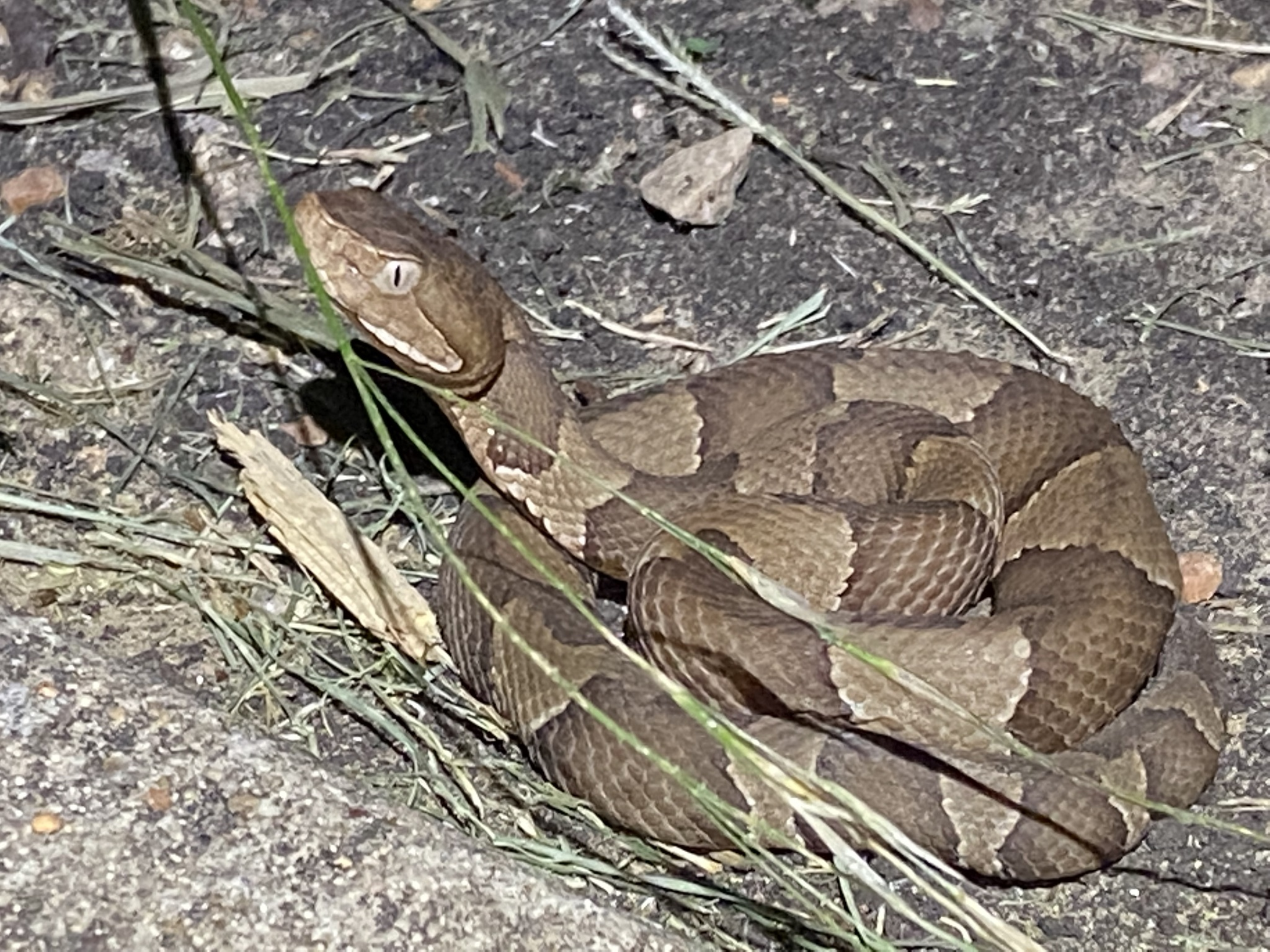
- Broad-banded copperhead (Agkistrodon laticinctus)
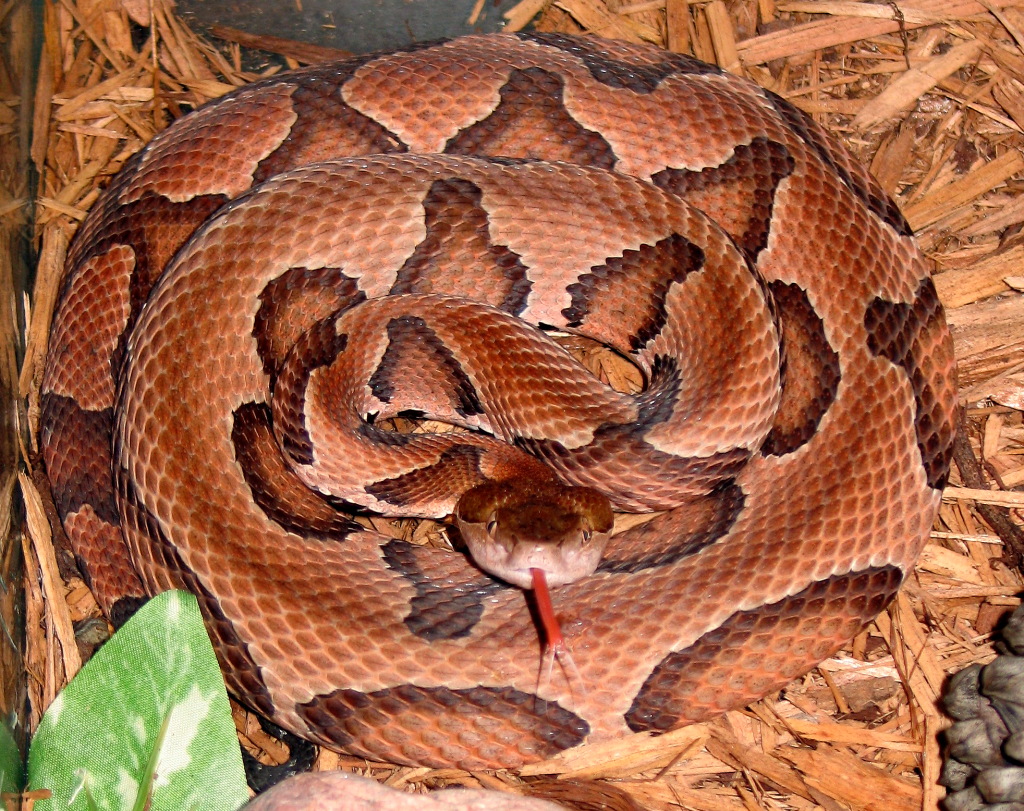
- Eastern copperhead (Agkistrodon contortrix)
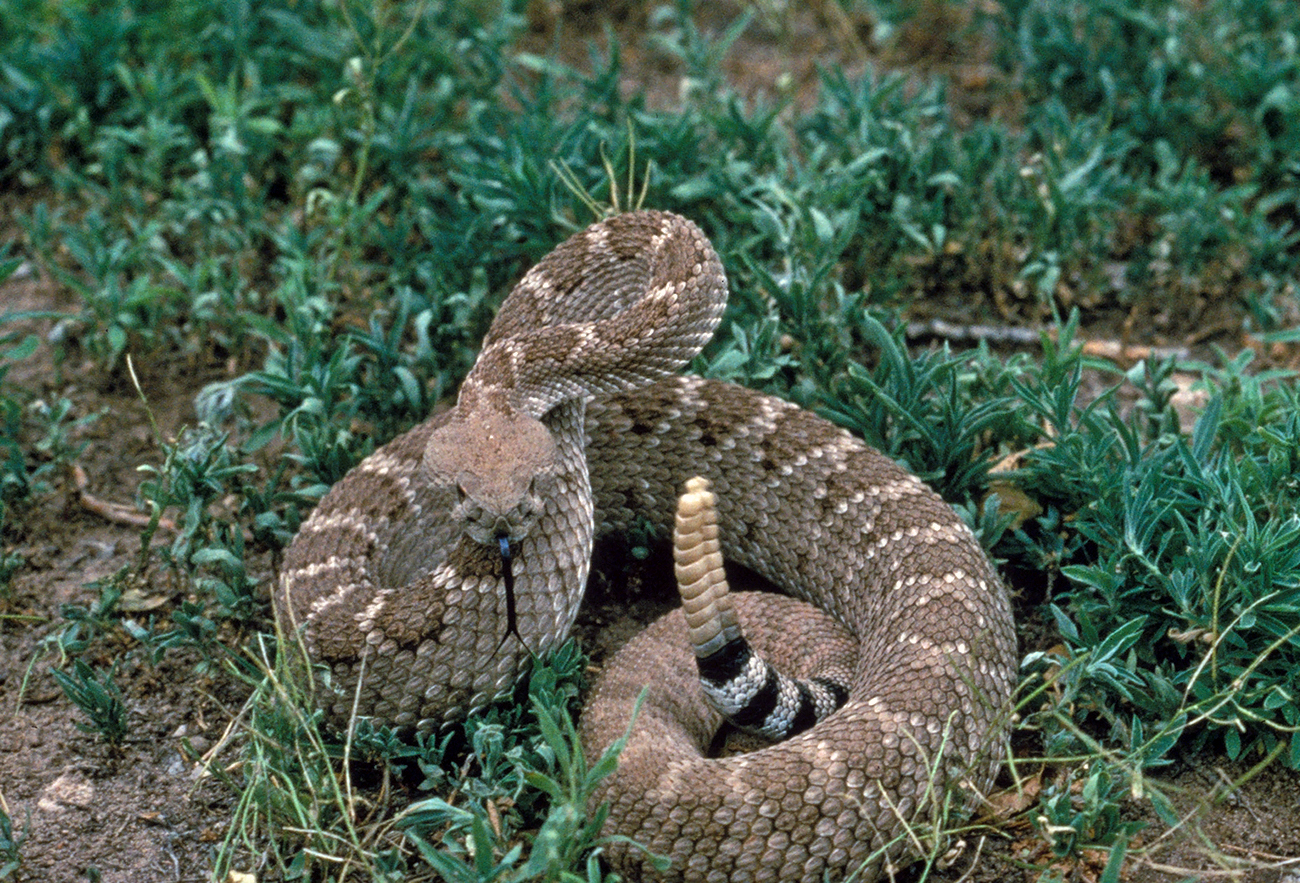
- Western diamondback rattlesnake (Crotalus atrox)
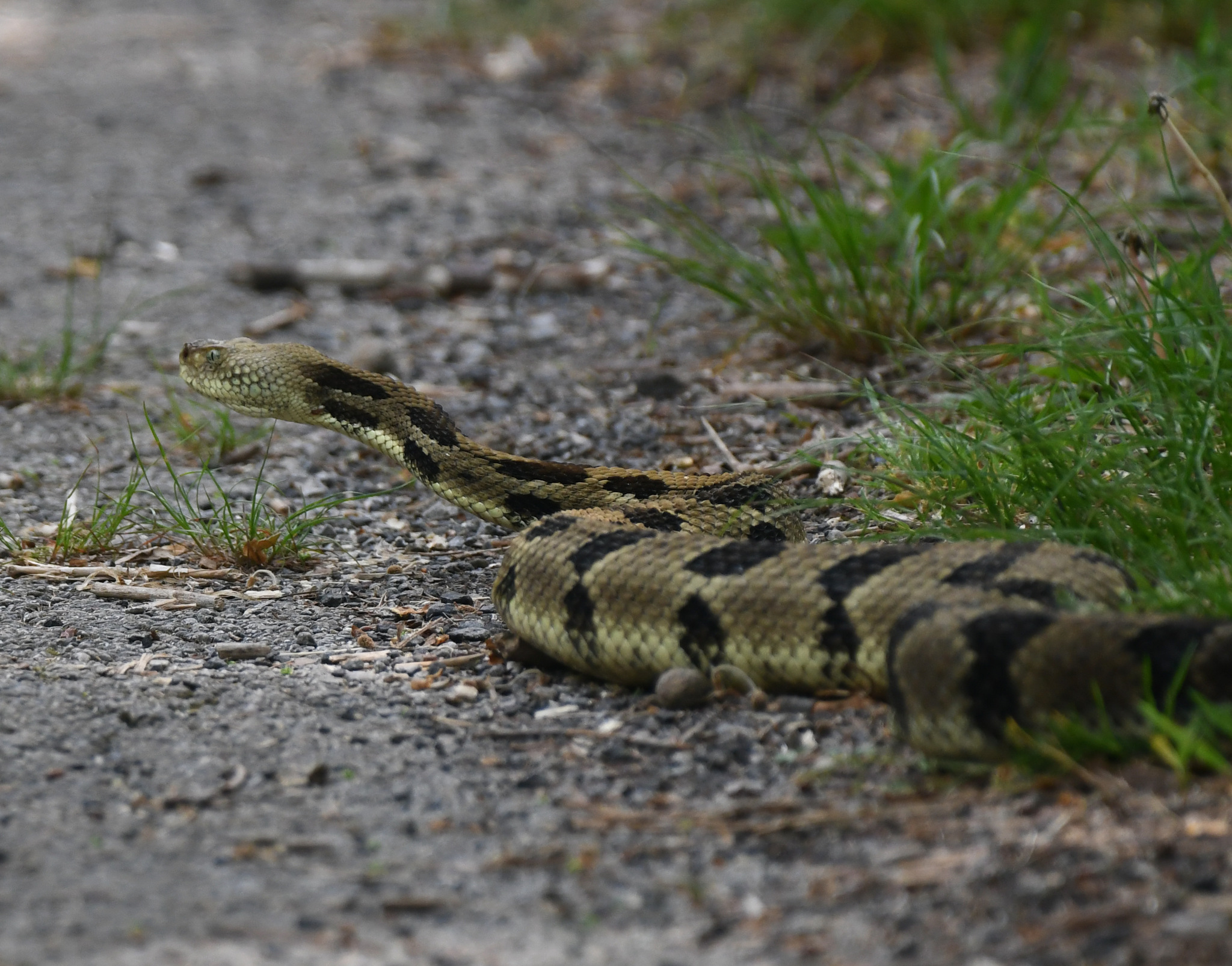
- Timber rattlesnake (Crotalus horridus)
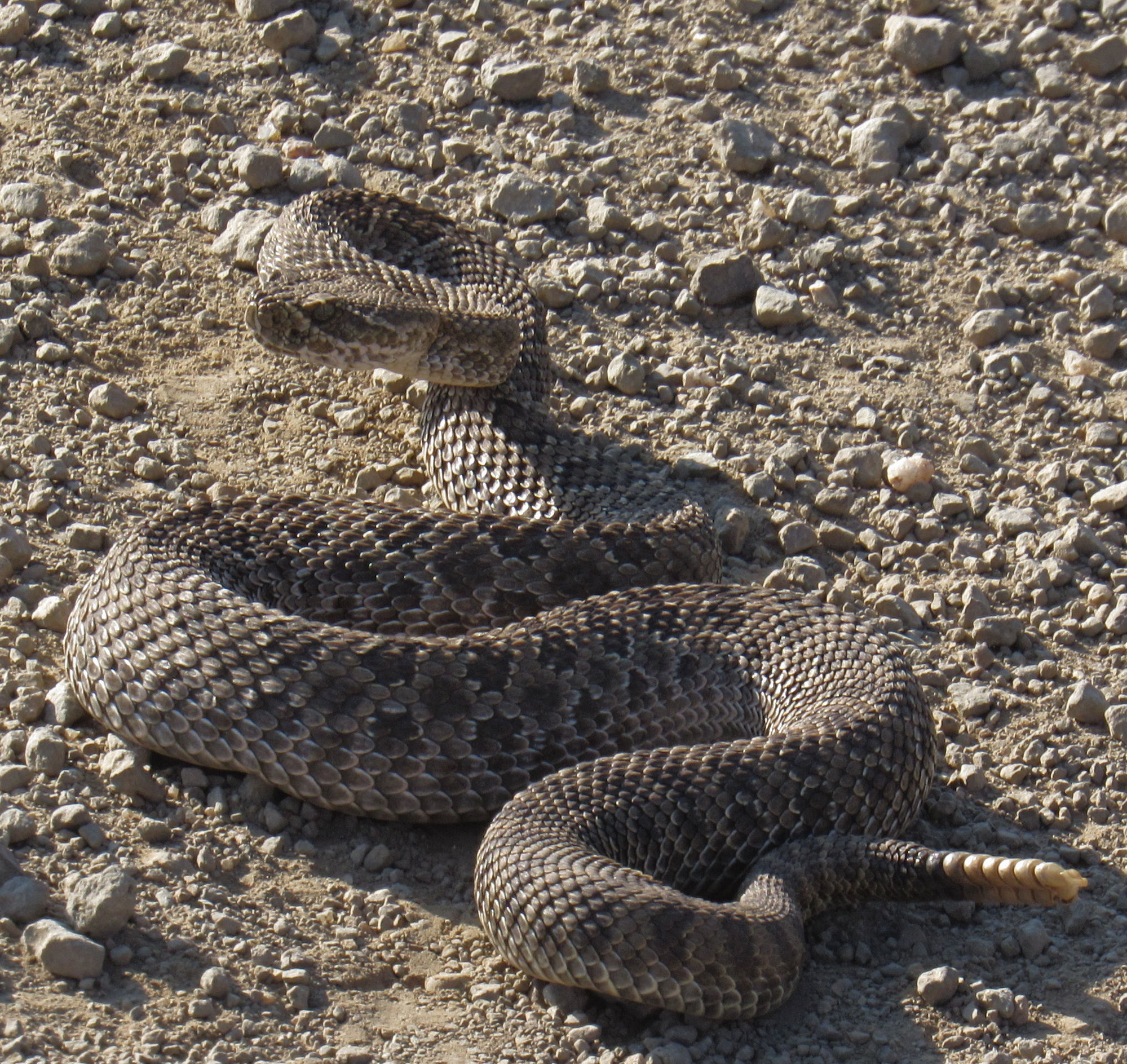
- Prairie rattlesnake (Crotalus viridis)
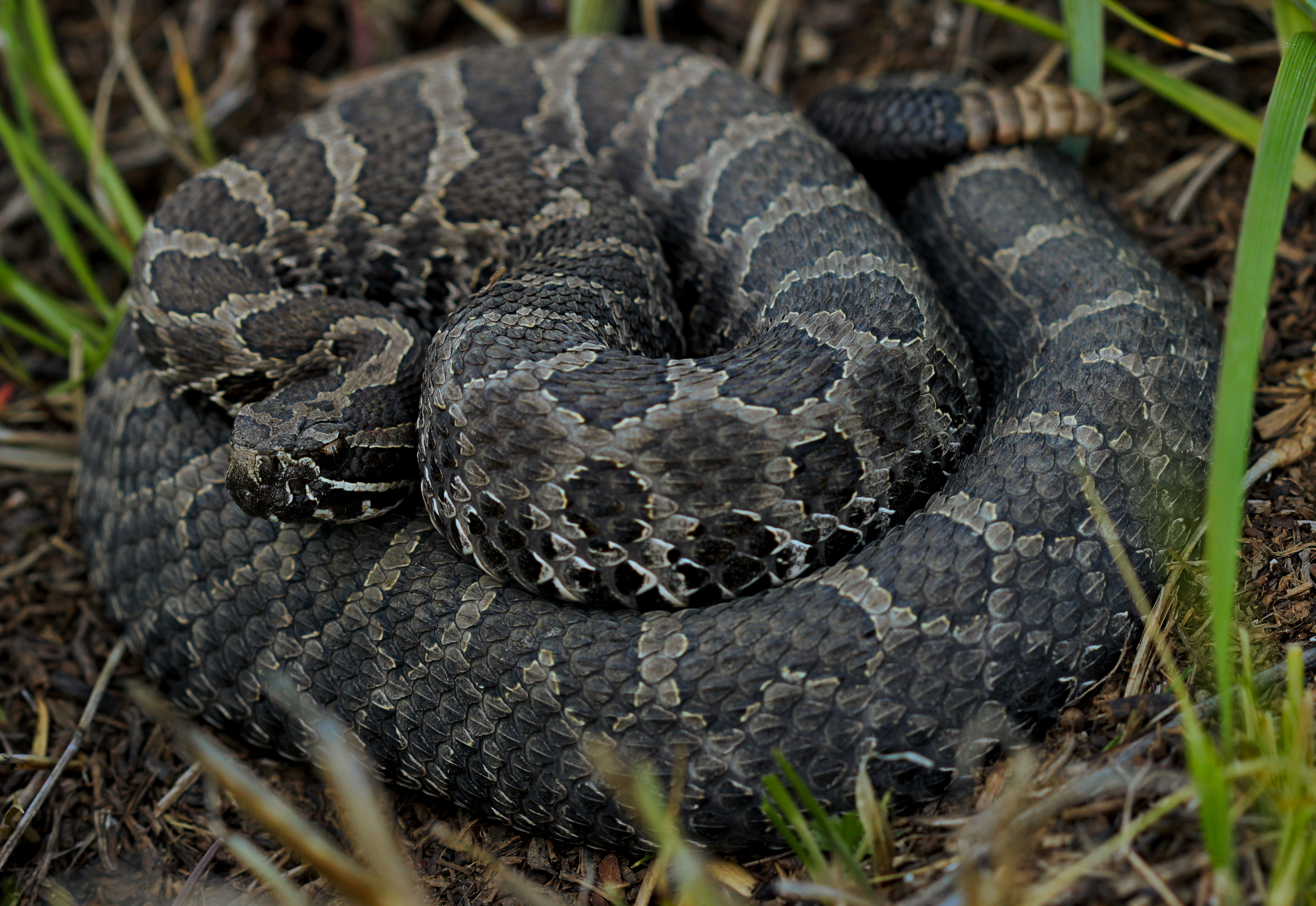
- Western massasauga (Sistrurus tergeminus)

== Non-venomous species ==
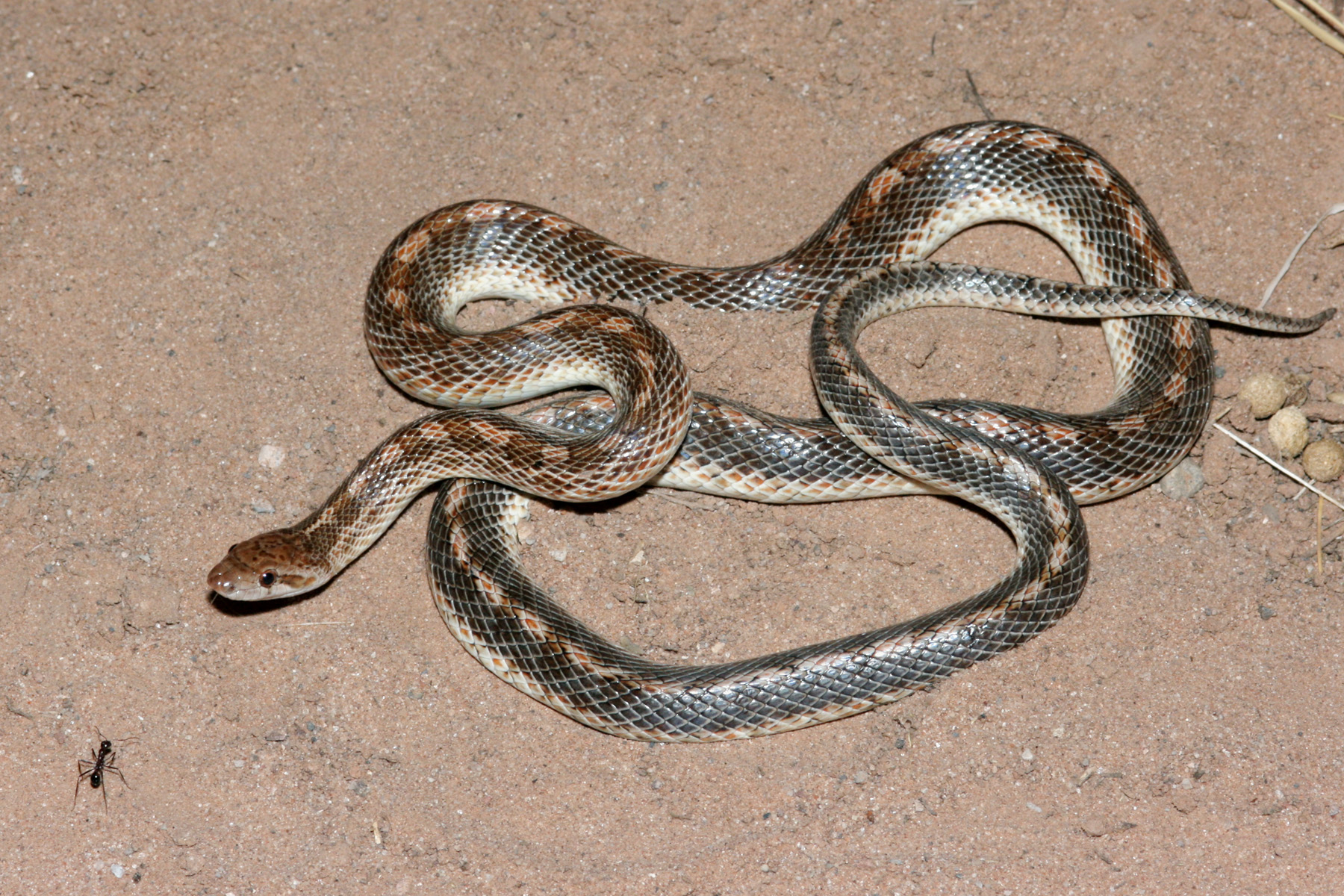
- Eastern glossy snake (Arizona elegans)
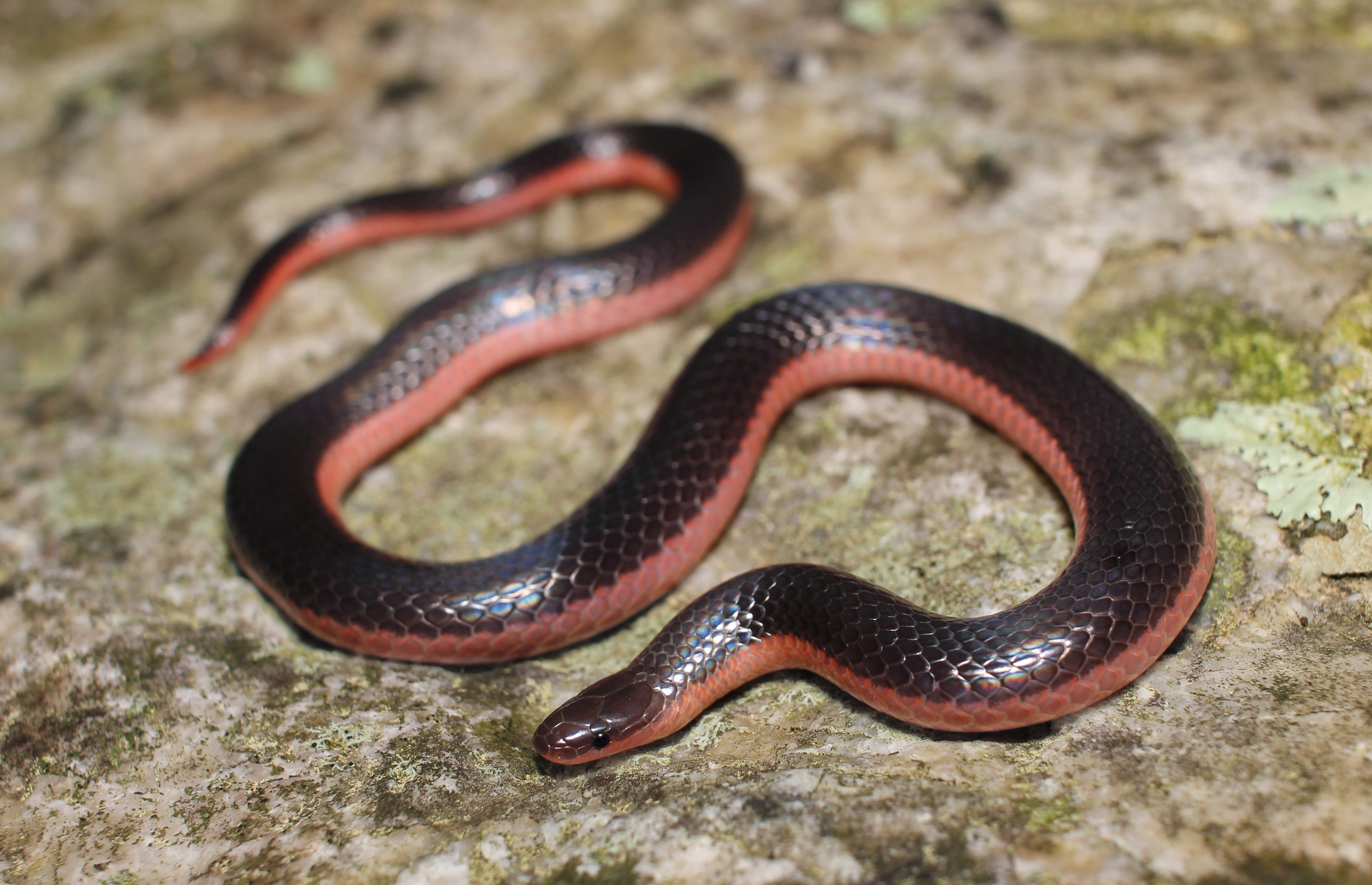
- Western worm snake (Carphophis vermis)
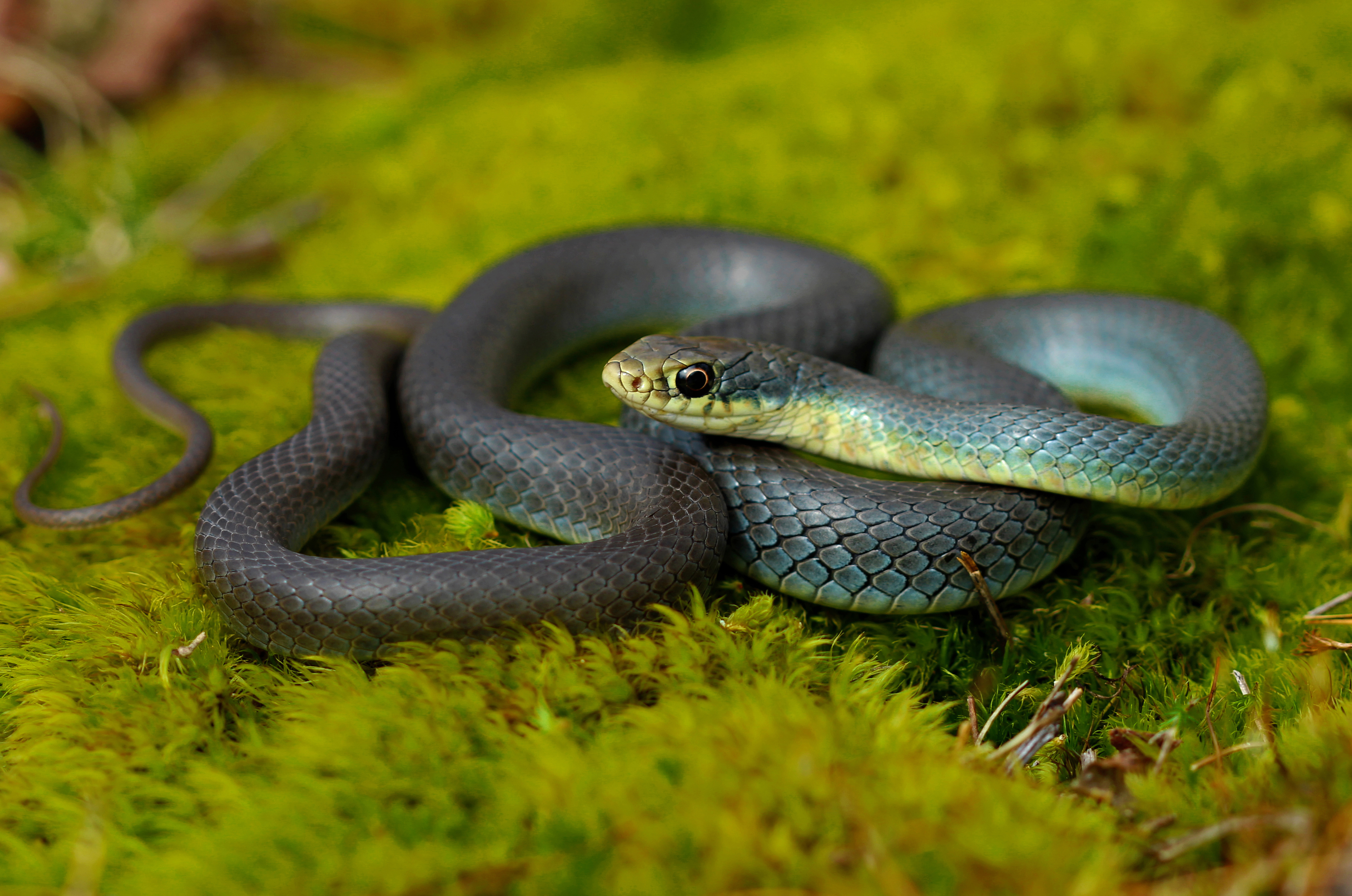
- Eastern racer (Coluber constrictor)
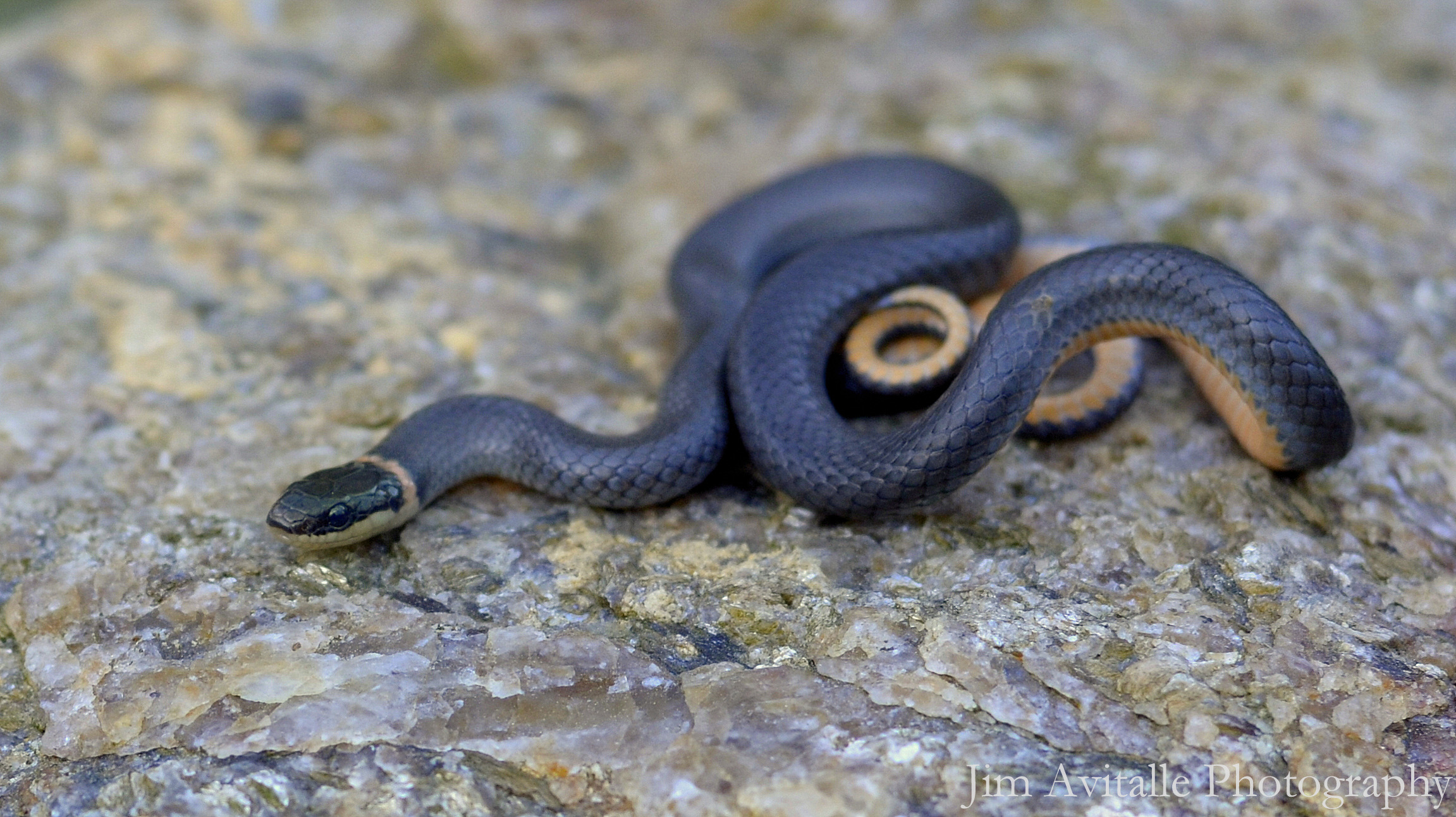
- Ringneck snake (Diadophis punctatus)
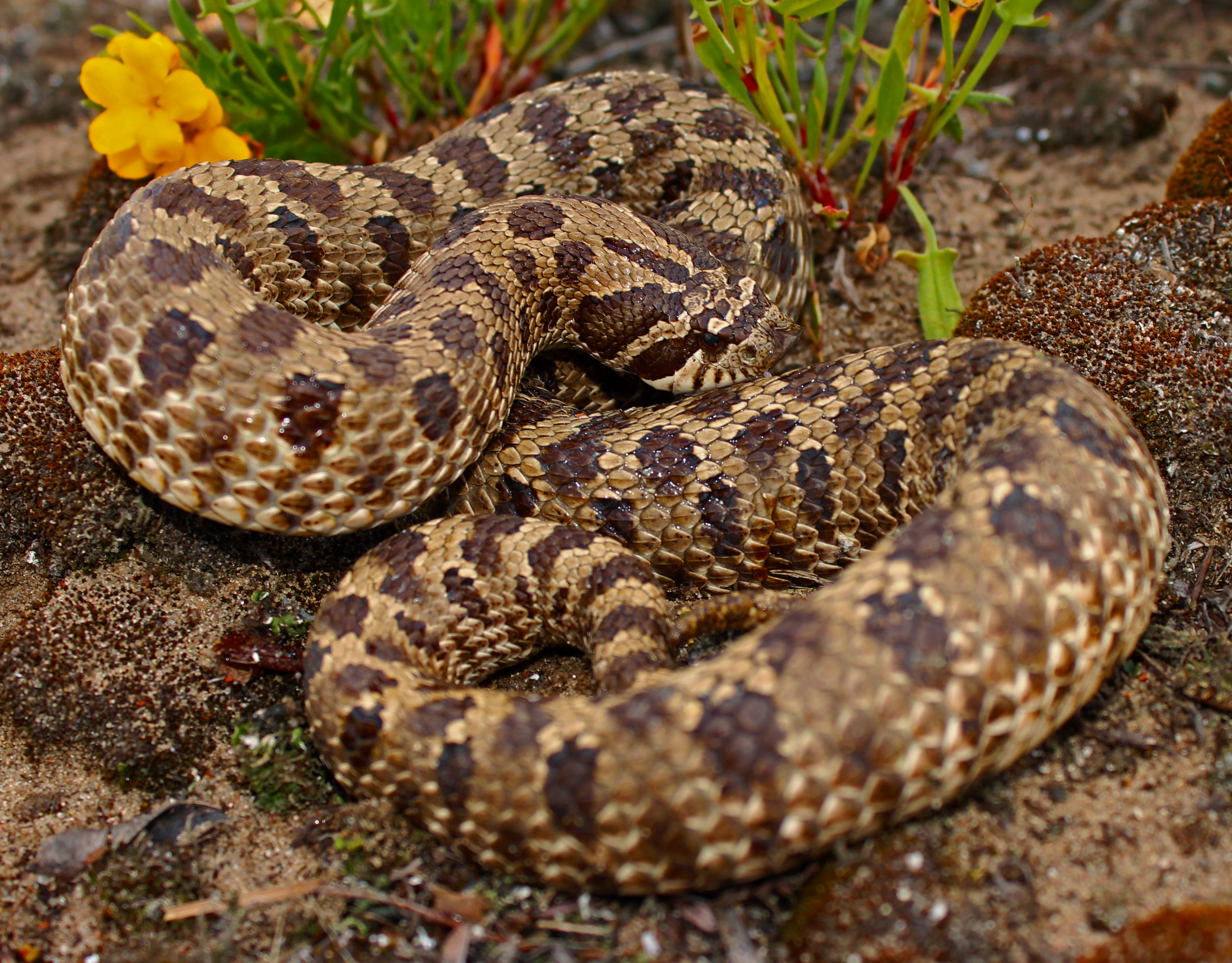
- Western hognose snake (Heterodon nasicus)
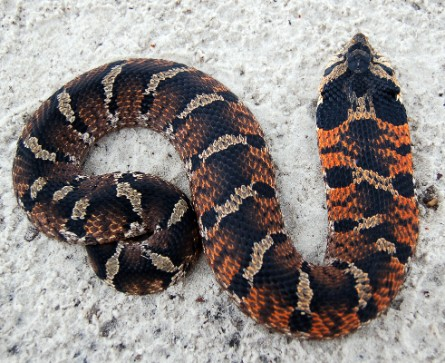
- Eastern hognose snake (Heterodon platirhinos)
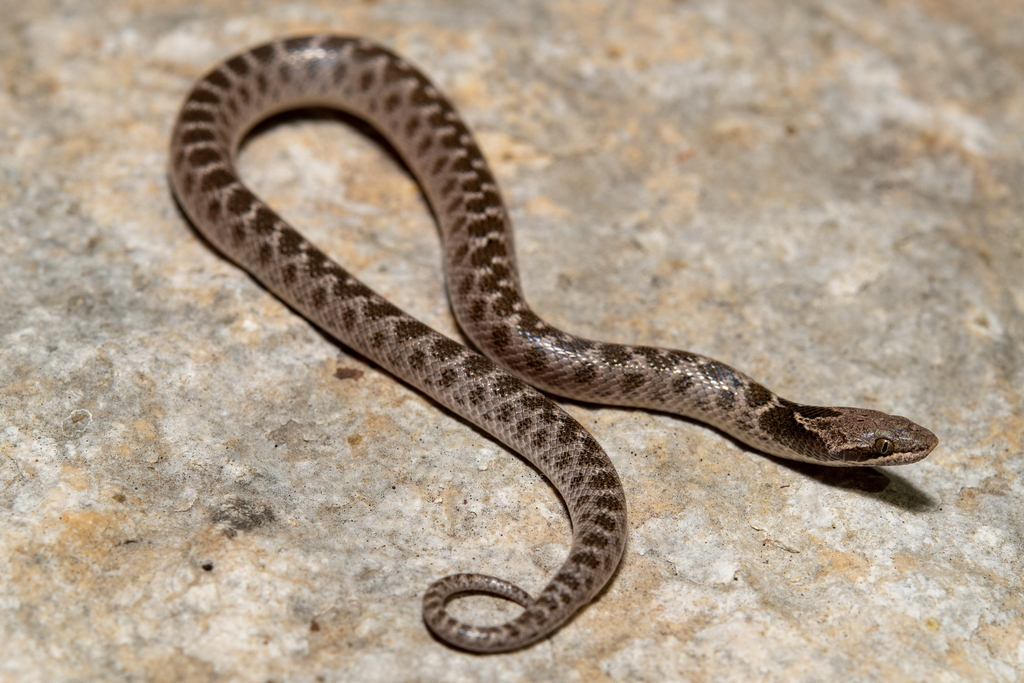
- Chihuahuan night snake (Hypsiglena jani)
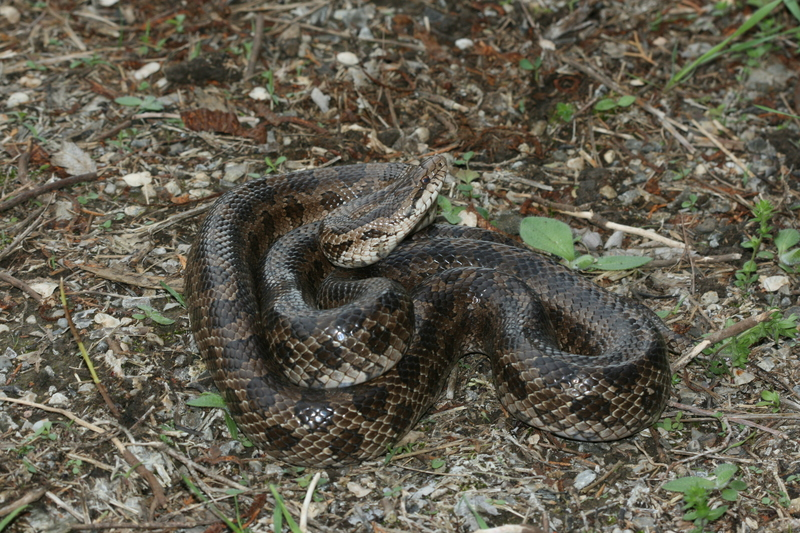
- Prairie kingsnake (Lampropeltis calligaster)
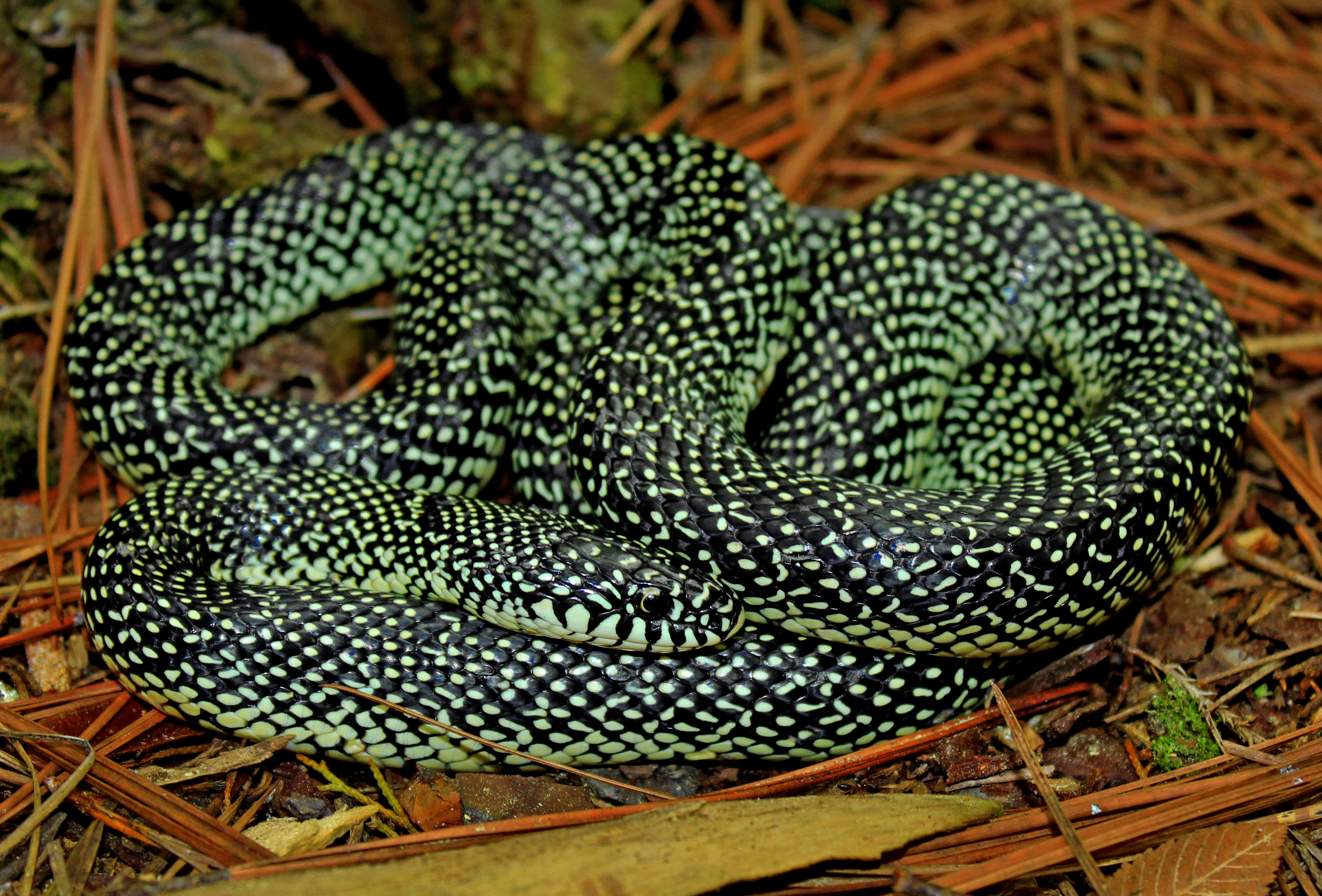
- Speckled kingsnake (Lampropeltis holbrooki)
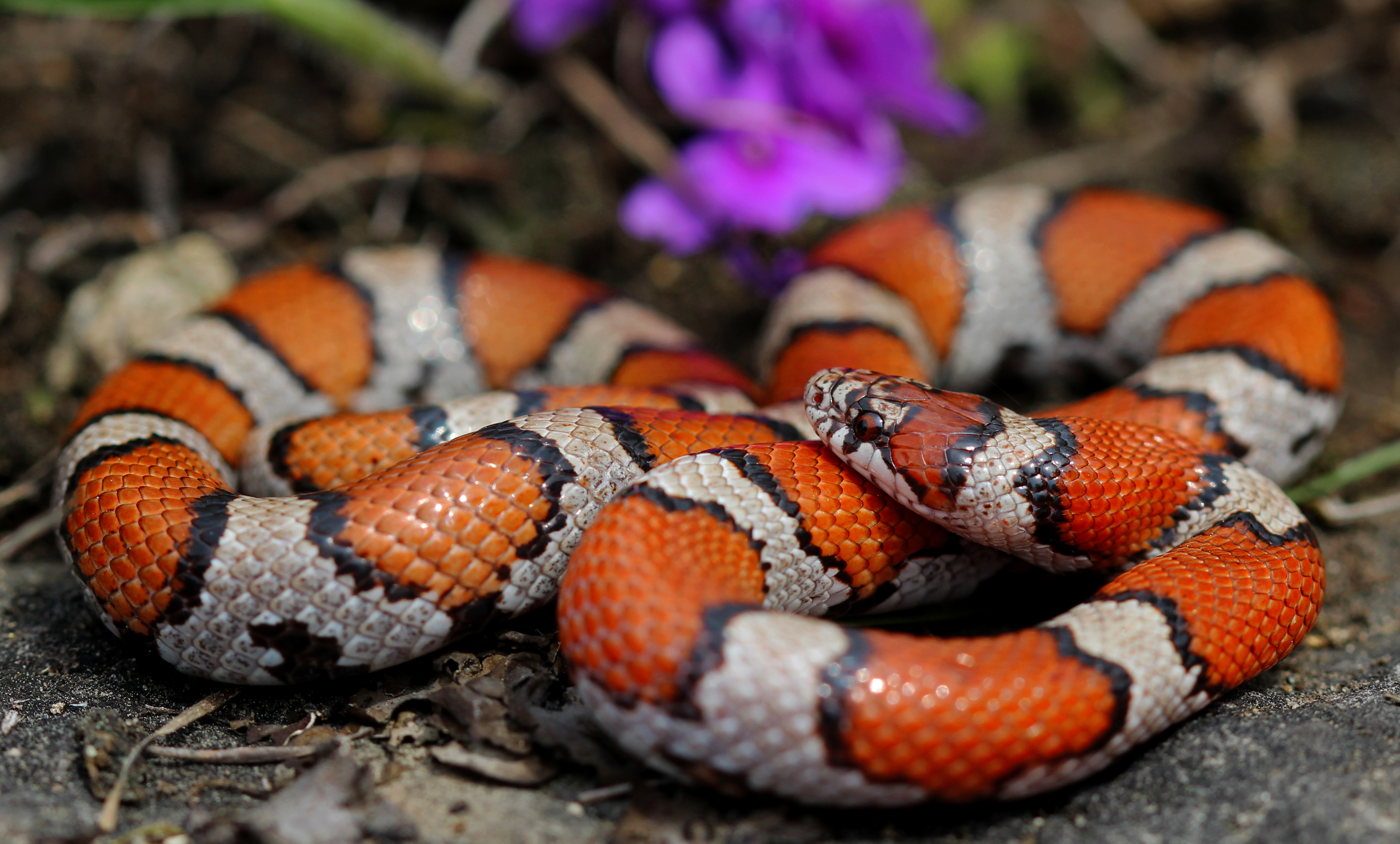
- Eastern milk snake (Lampropeltis triangulum)
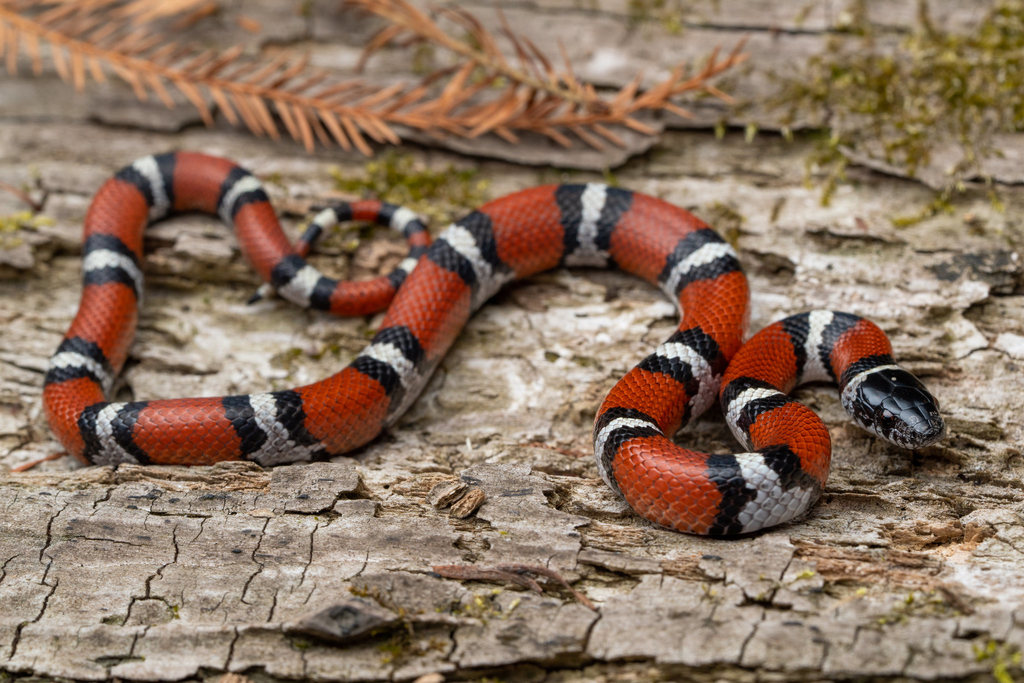
- Western milk snake (Lampropeltis gentilis)
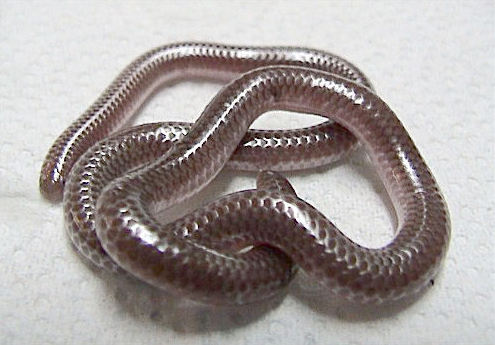
- Texas threadsnake (Rena dulcis)
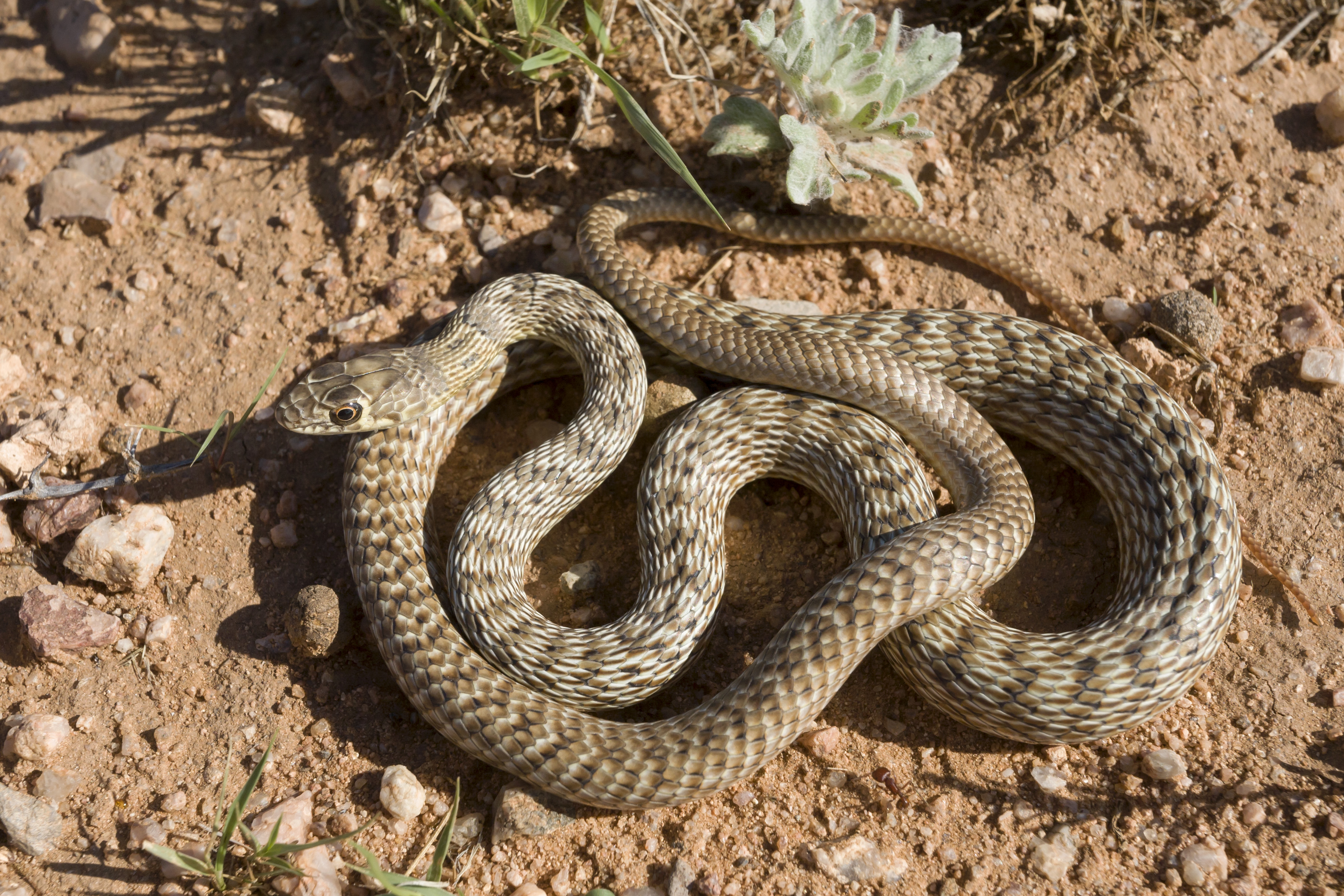
- Coachwhip (Masticophis flagellum)
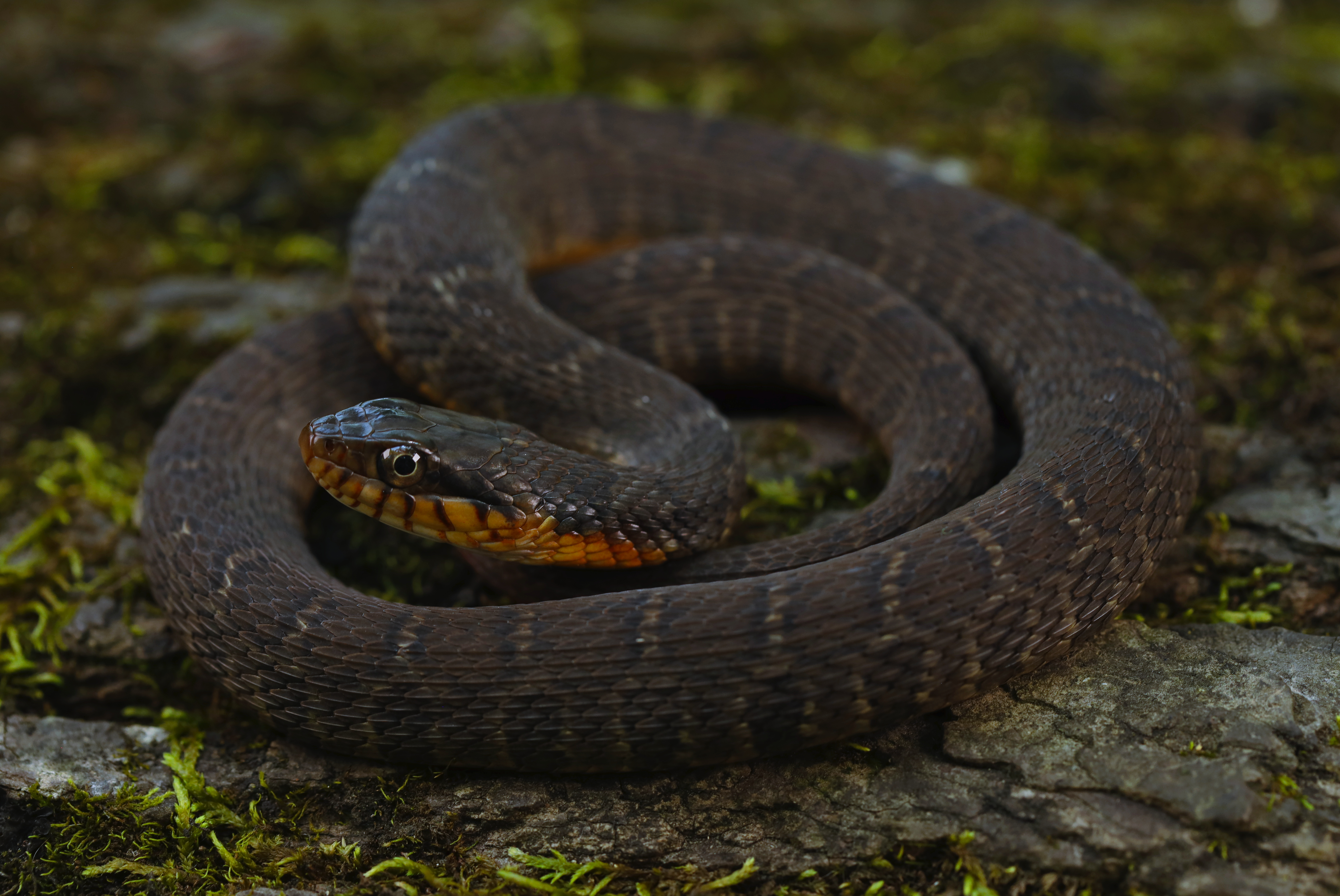
- Plainbelly water snake (Nerodia erythrogaster)
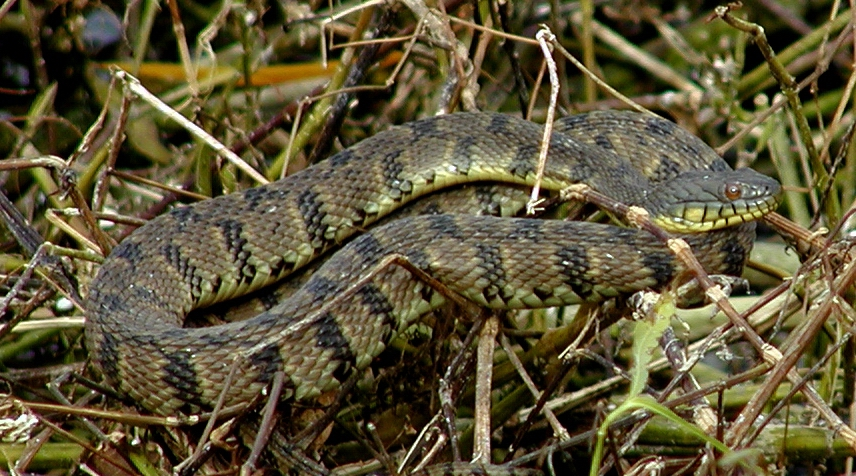
- Diamondback water snake (Nerodia rhombifer)
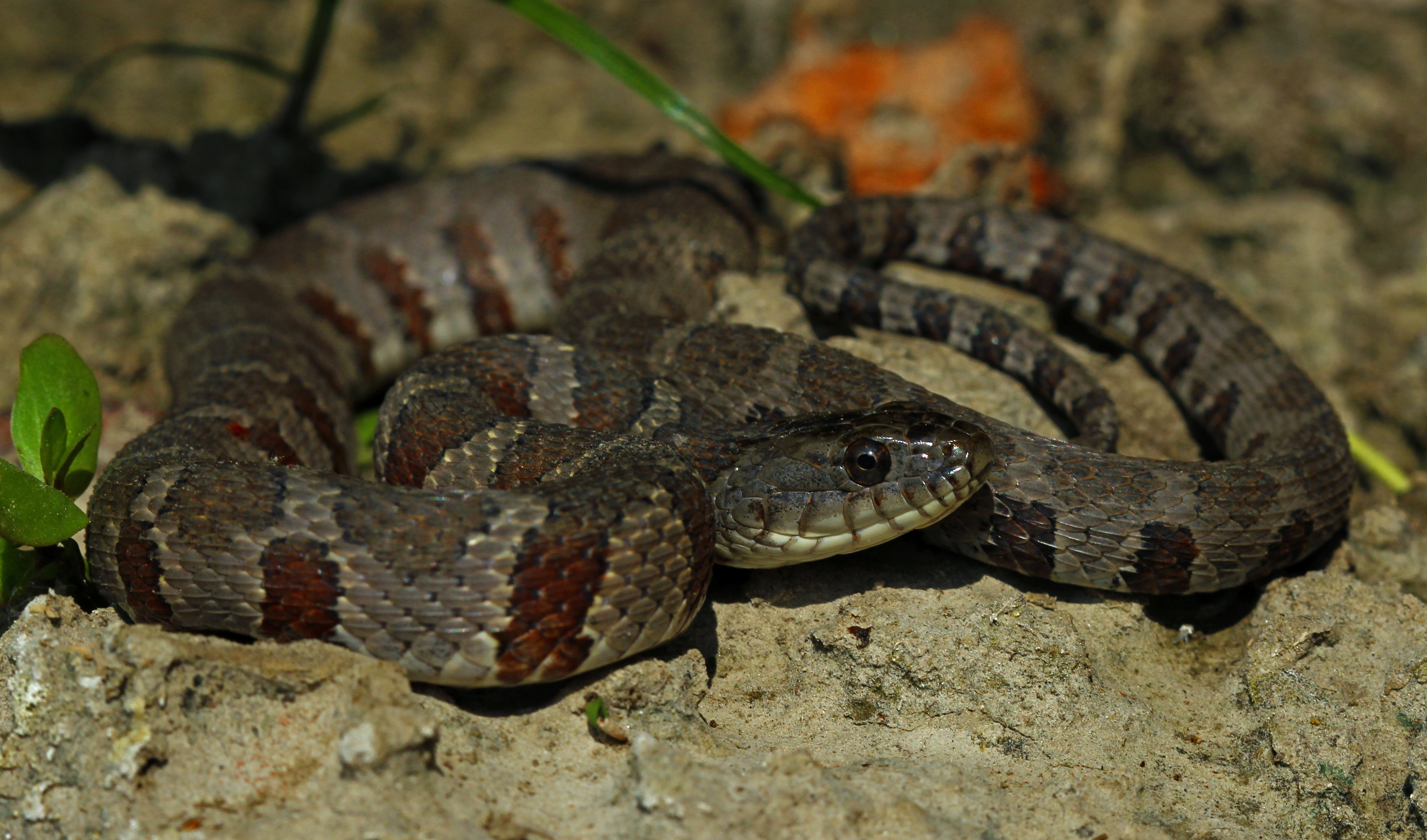
- Northern water snake (Nerodia sipedon)
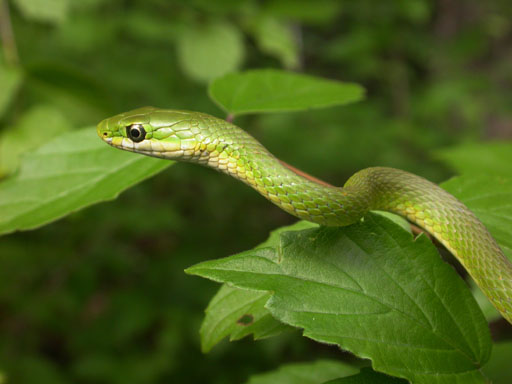
- Rough green snake (Opheodrys aestivus)
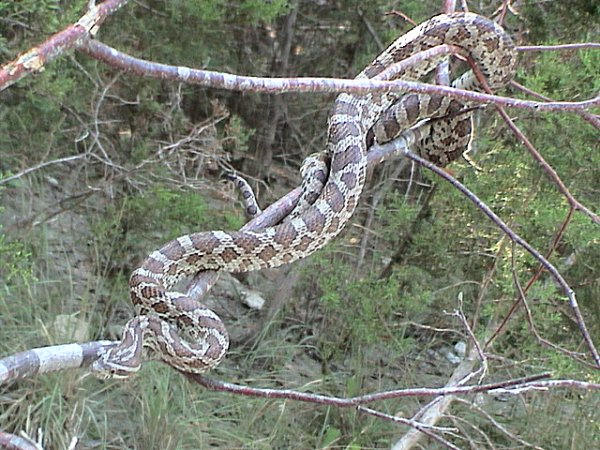
- Great Plains rat snake (Pantherophis emoryi)
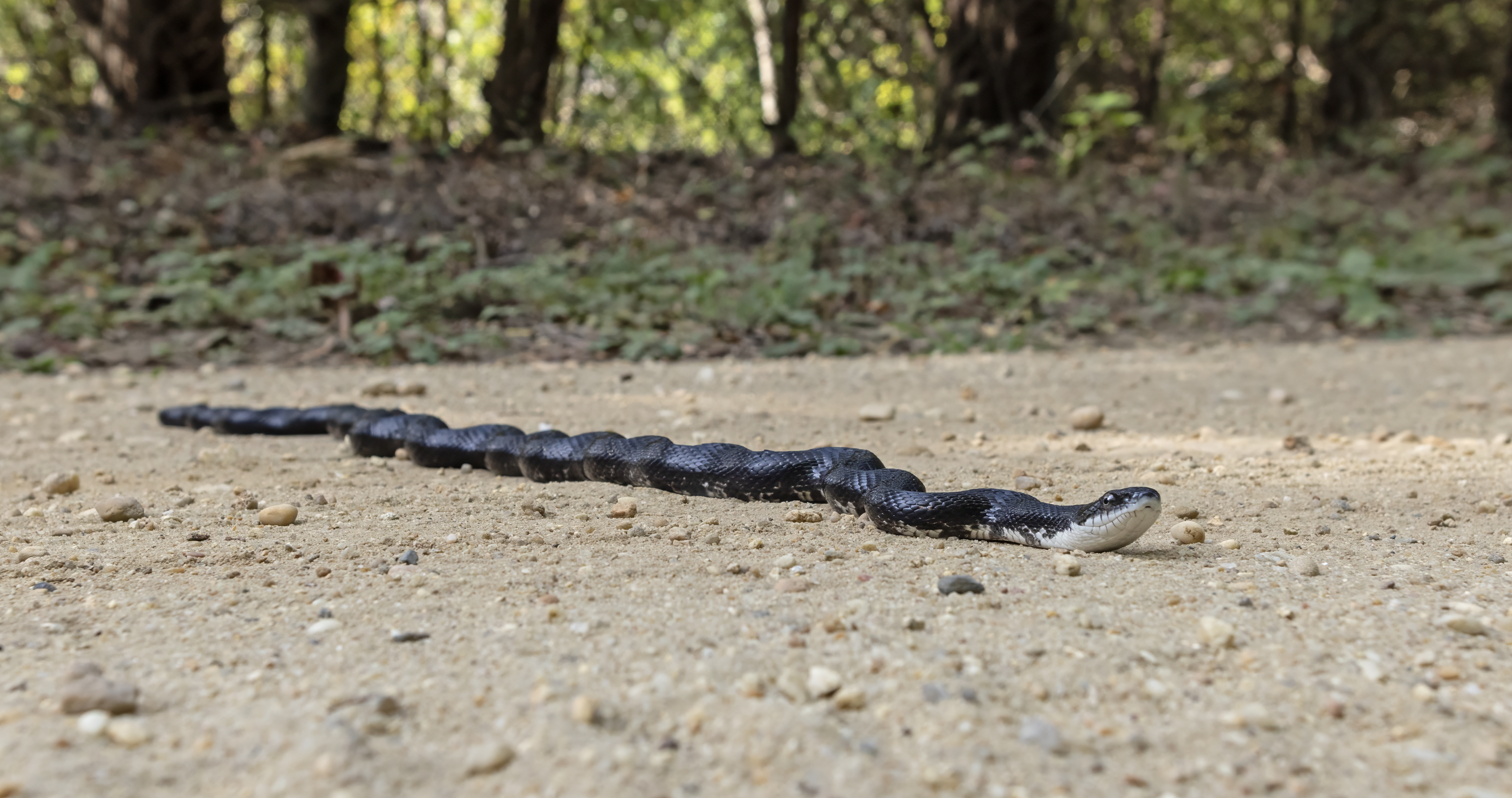
- Western rat snake (Pantherophis obsoletus)
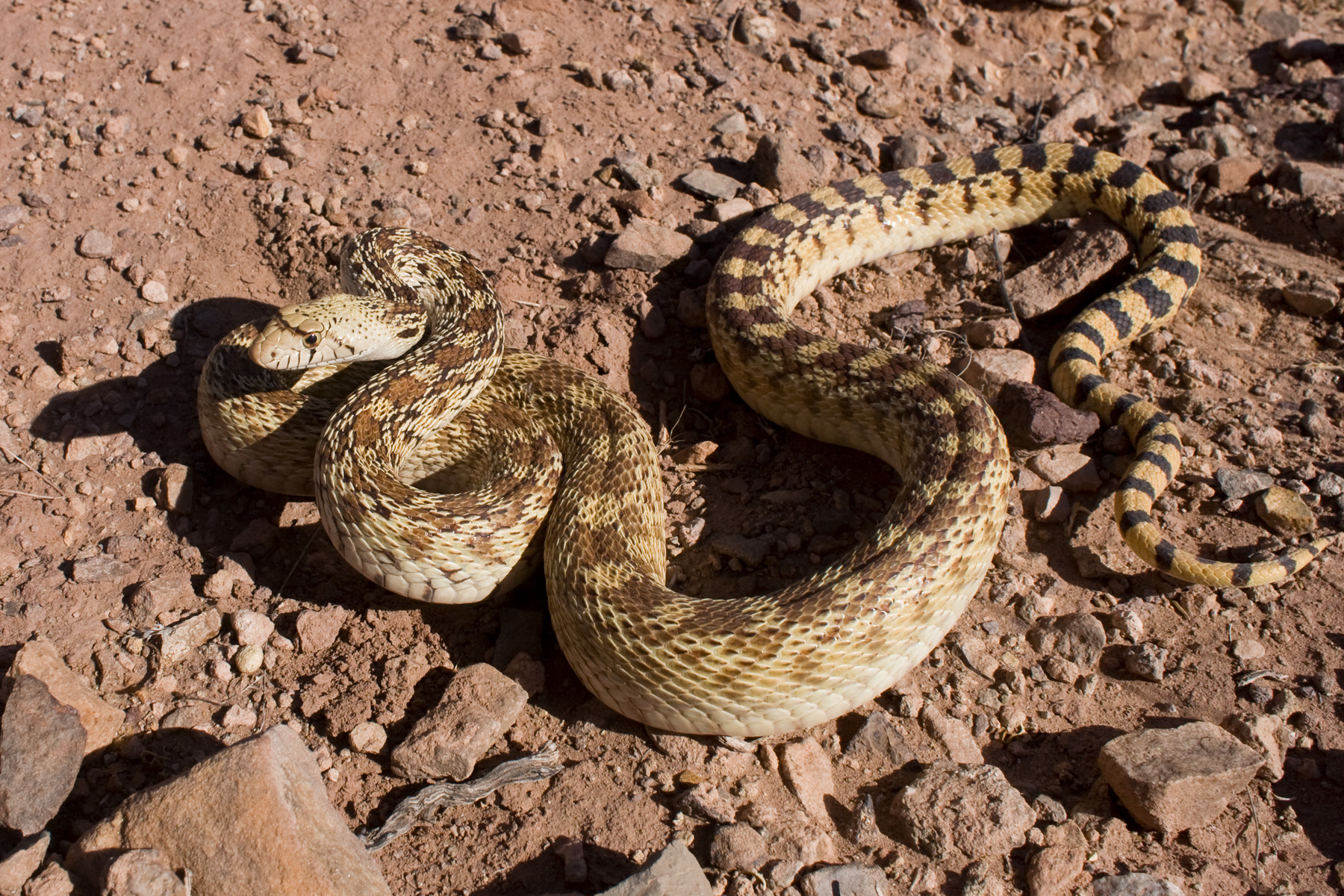
- Gopher snake (Pituophis catenifer)
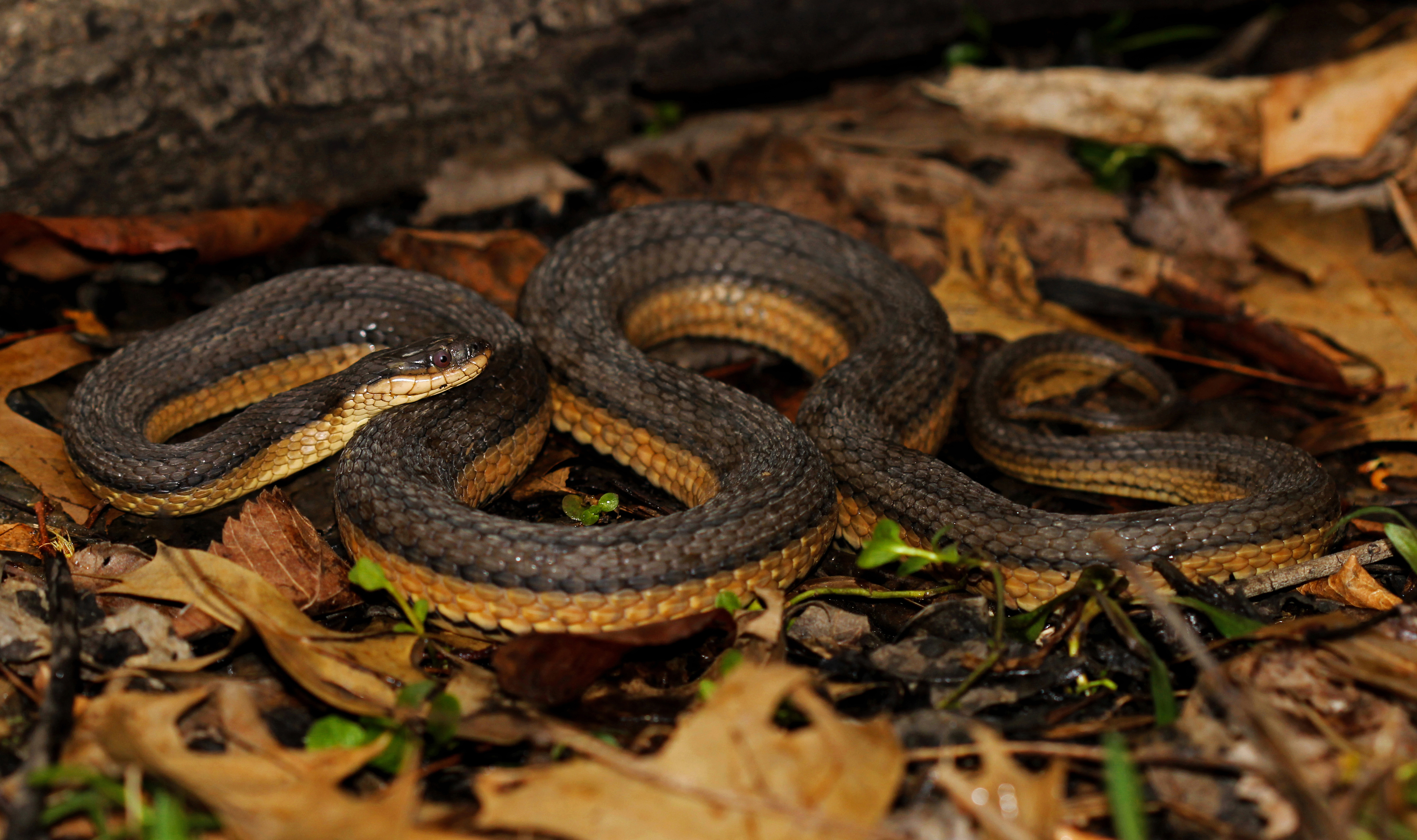
- Graham's crayfish snake (Regina grahamii)
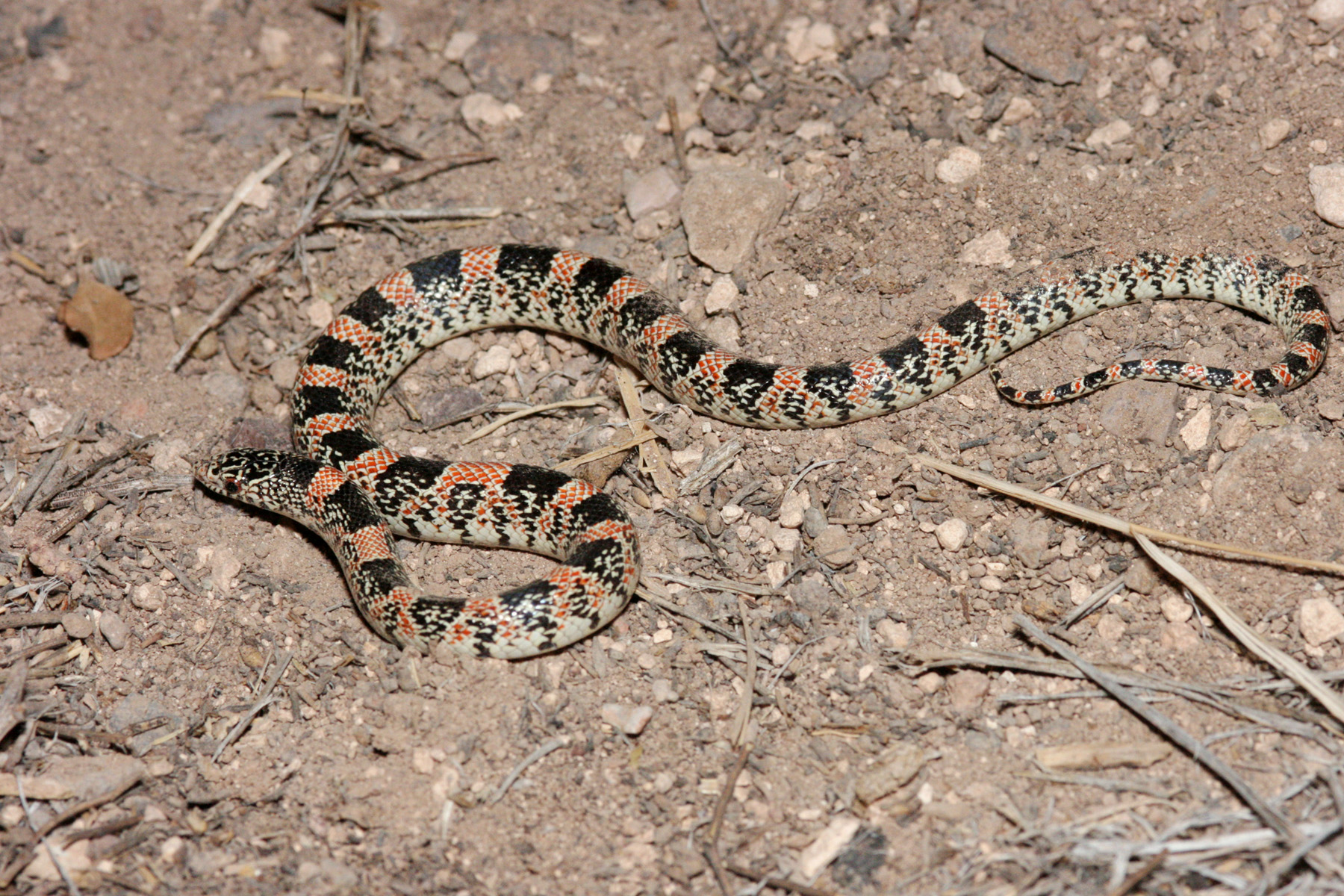
- Longnose snake (Rhinocheilus lecontei)
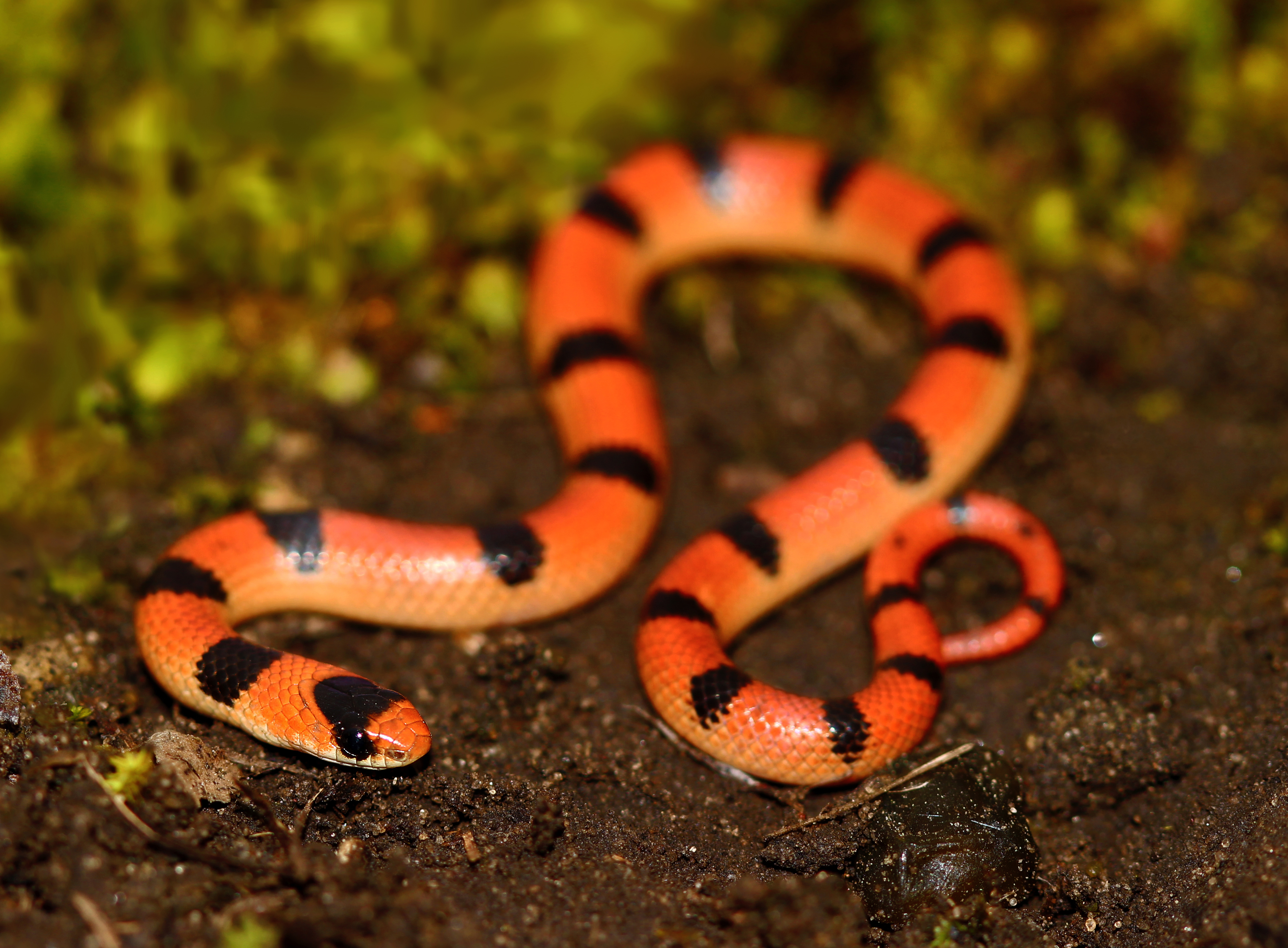
- Great plains ground snake (Sonora episcopa)
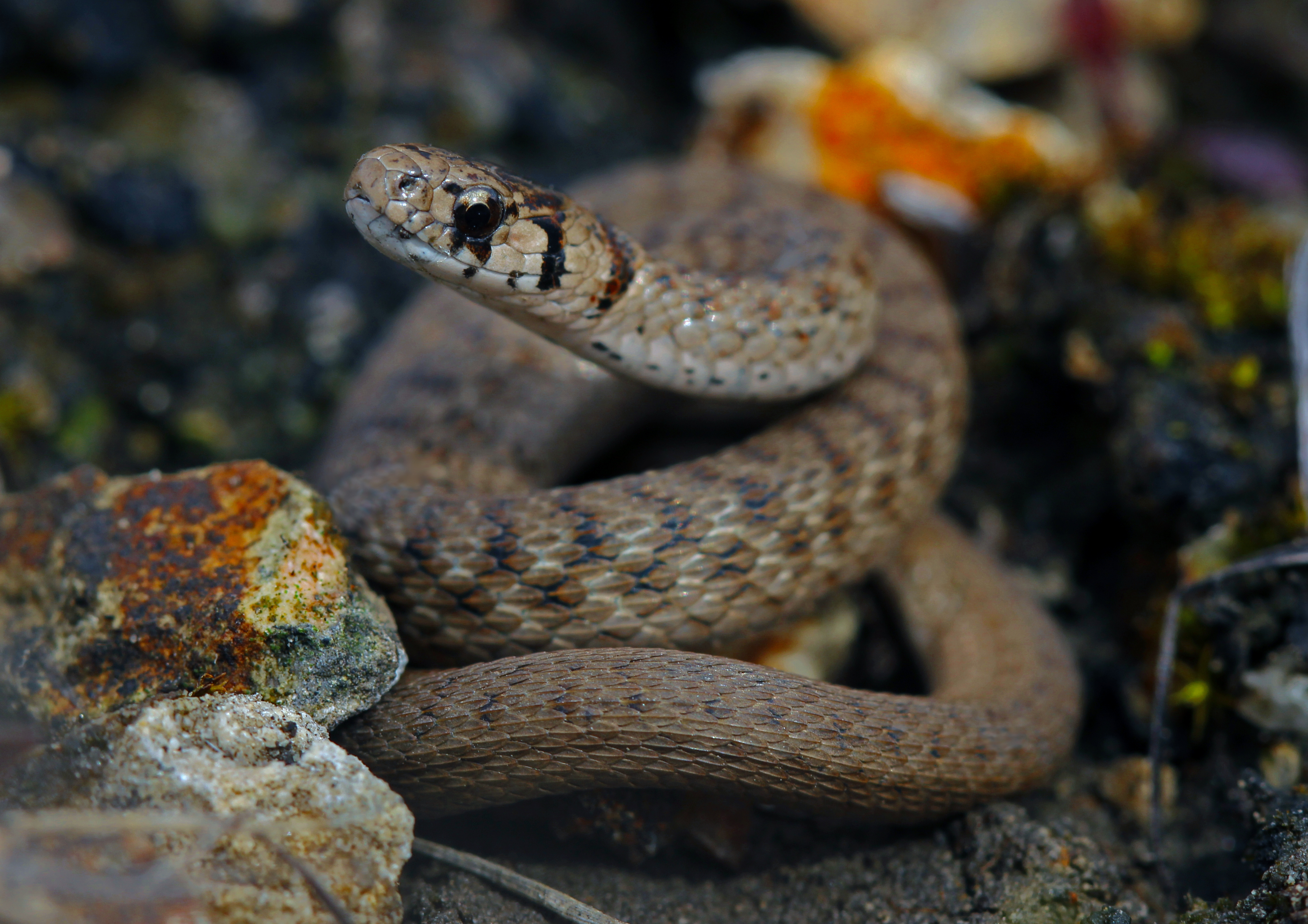
- Brown snake (Storeria dekayi)
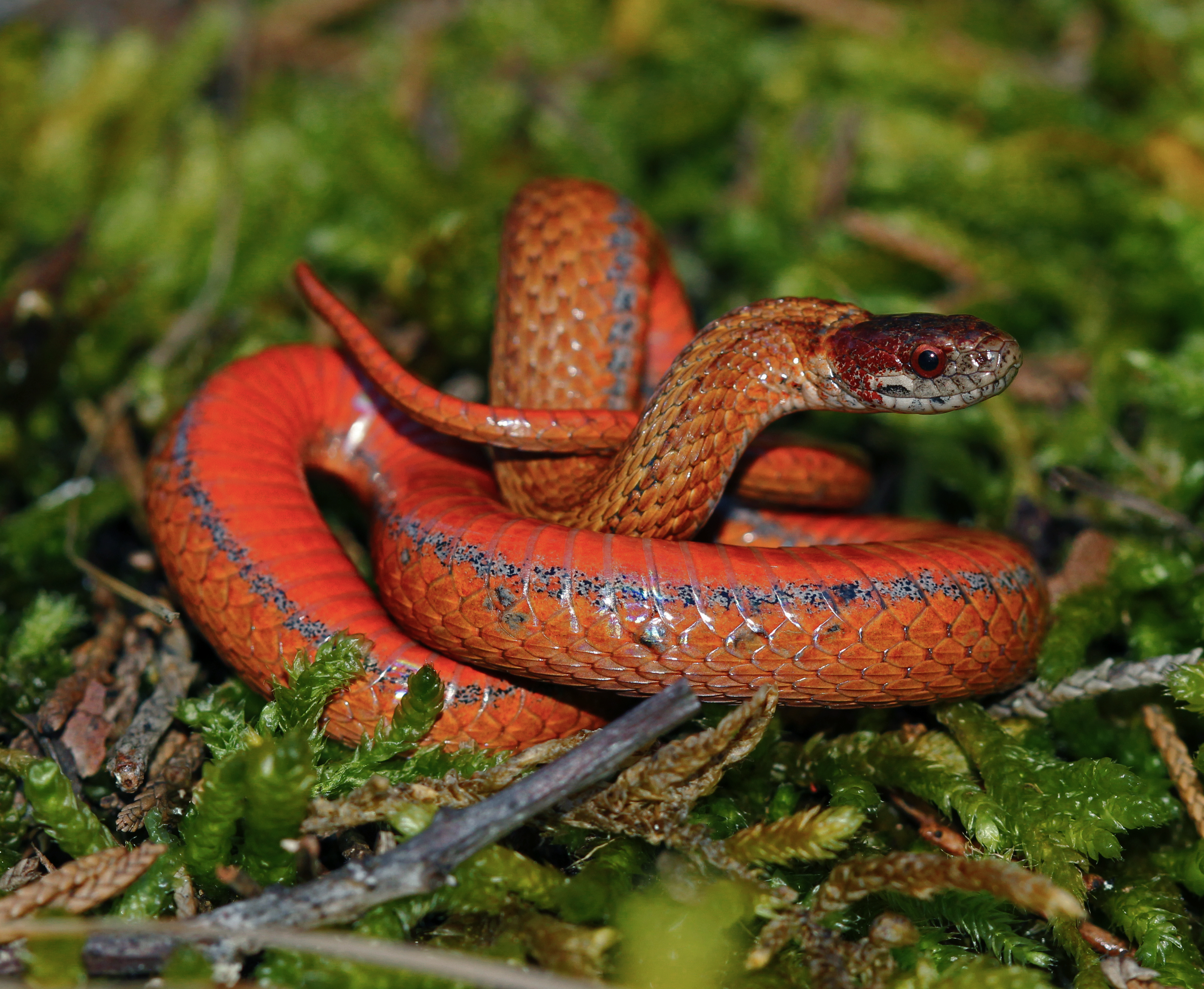
- Redbelly snake (Storeria occipitomaculata)
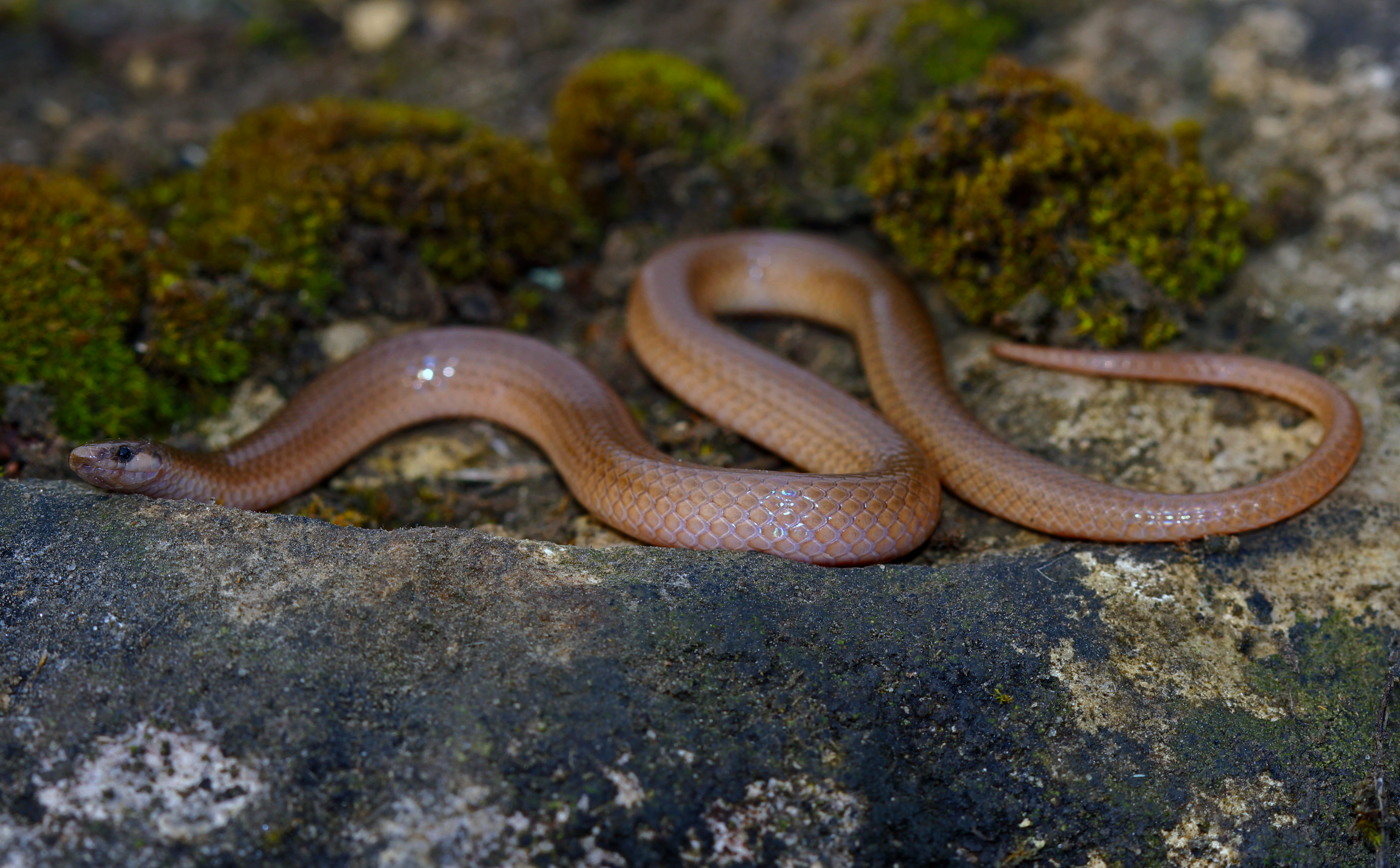
- Flathead snake (Tantilla gracilis)
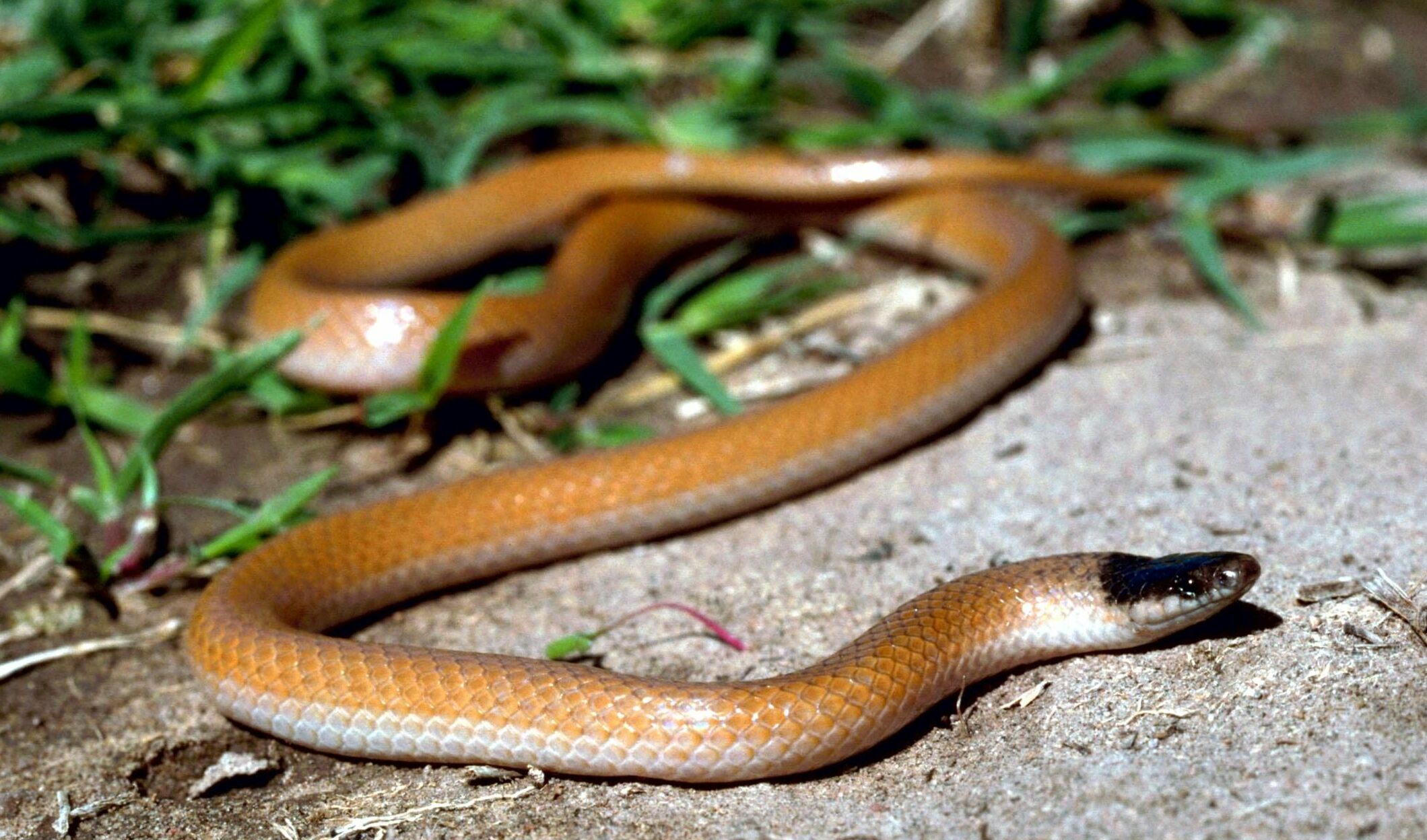
- Plains blackhead snake (Tantilla nigriceps)
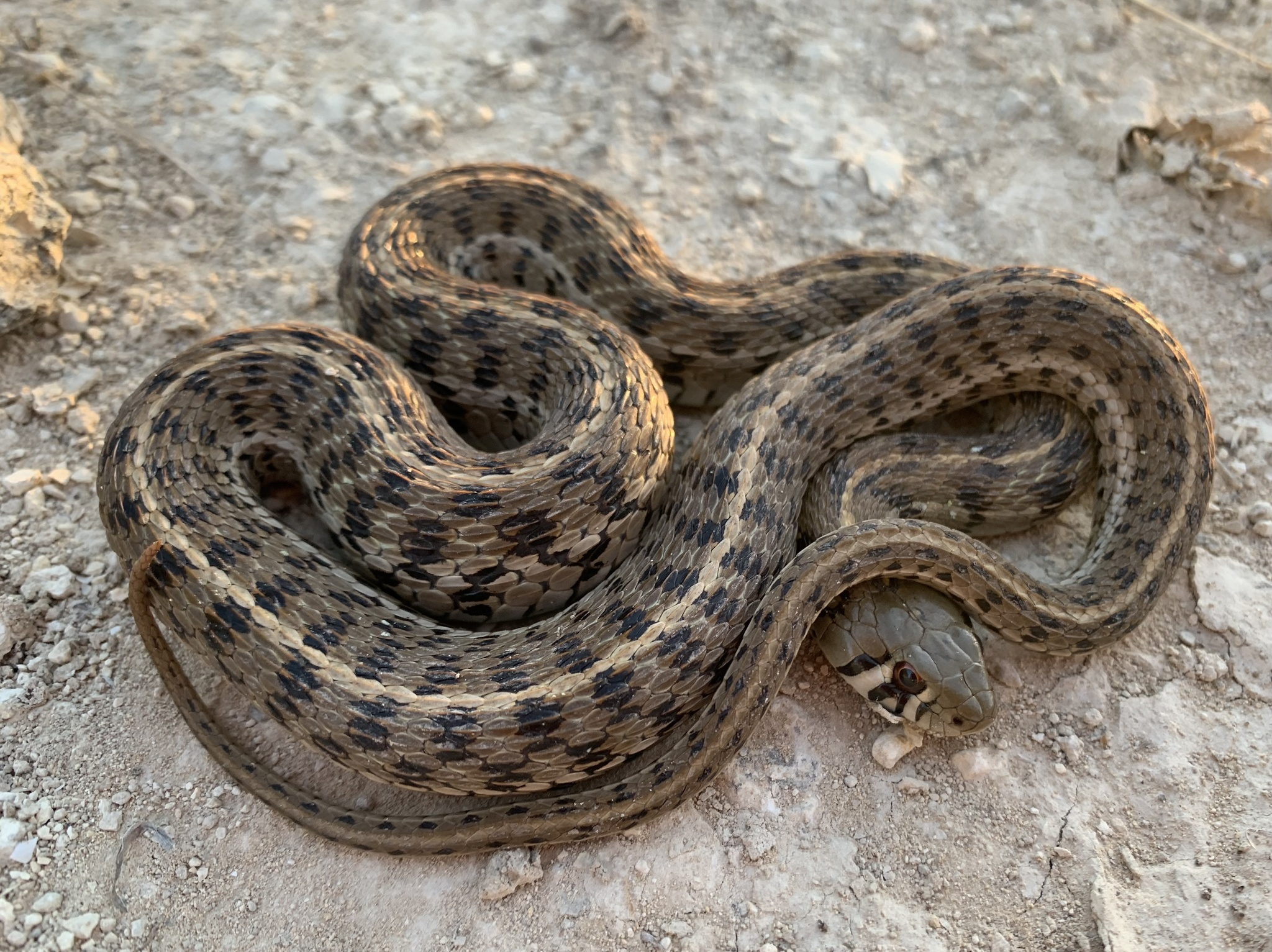
- Checkered garter snake (Thamnophis marcianus)
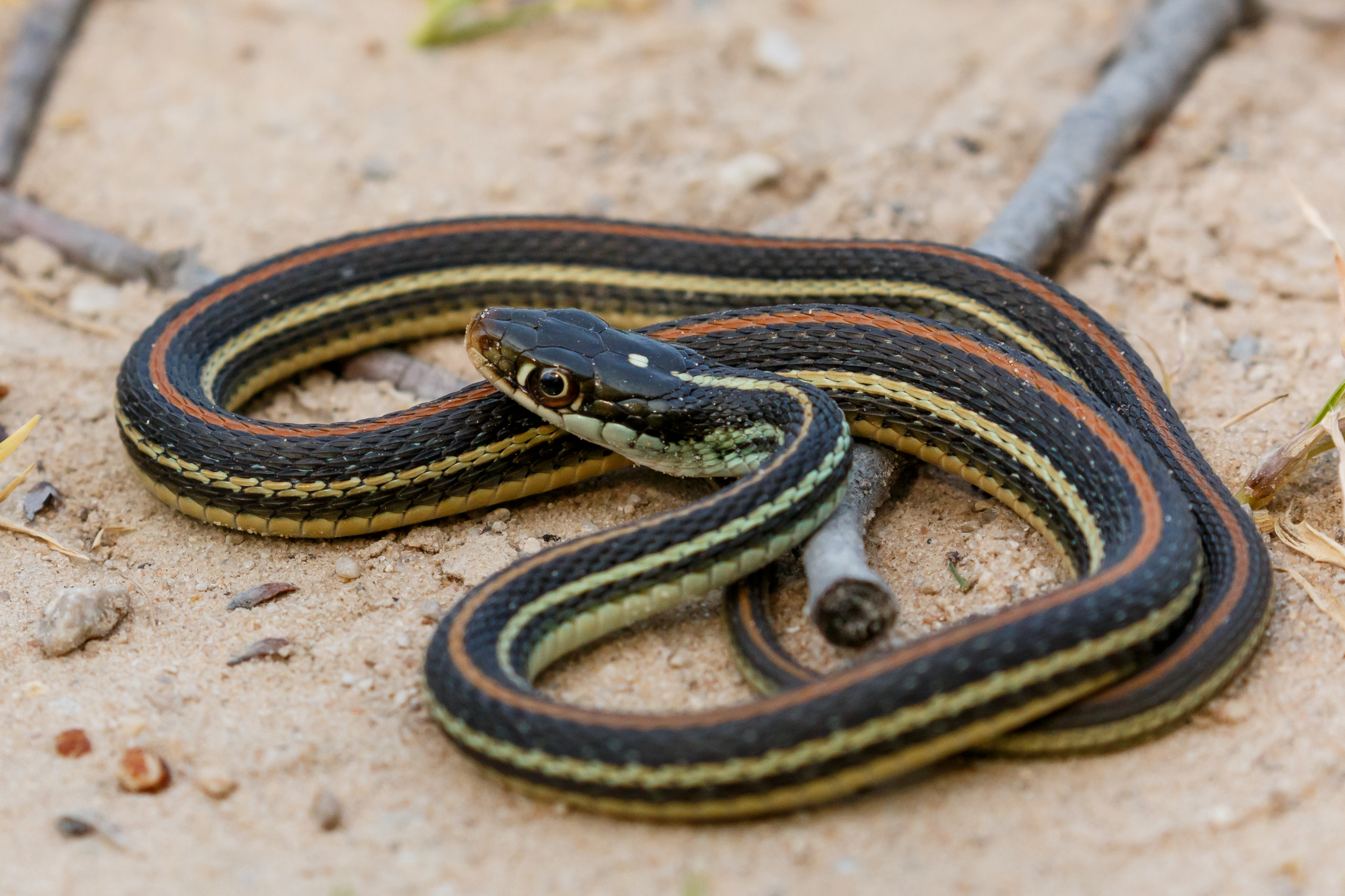
- Western ribbon snake (Thamnophis proximus)
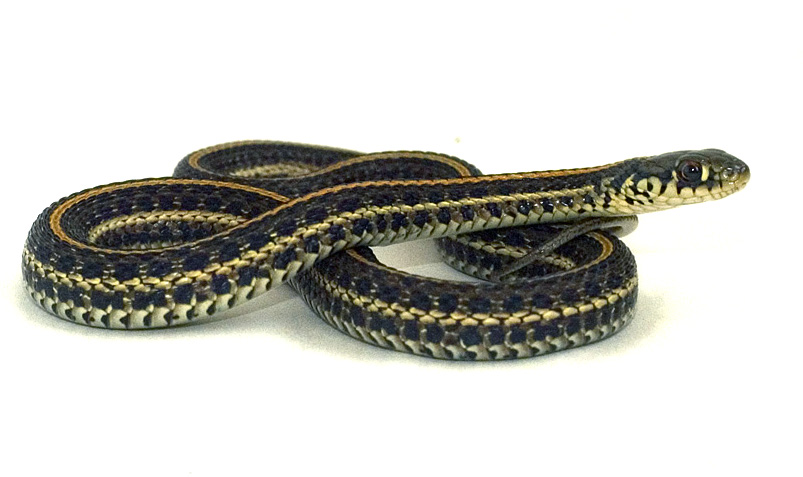
- Plains garter snake (Thamnophis radix)
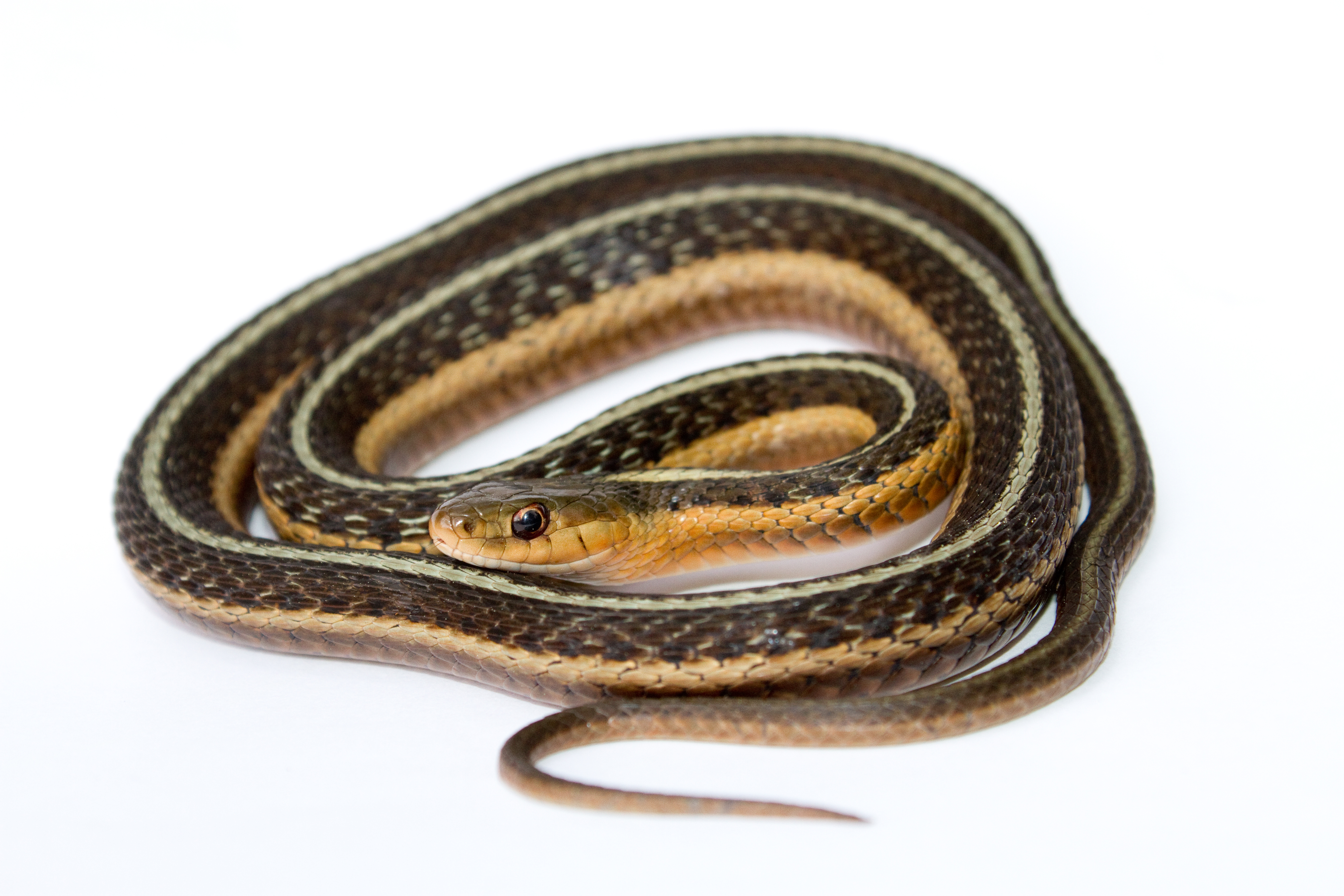
- Common garter snake (Thamnophis sirtalis)
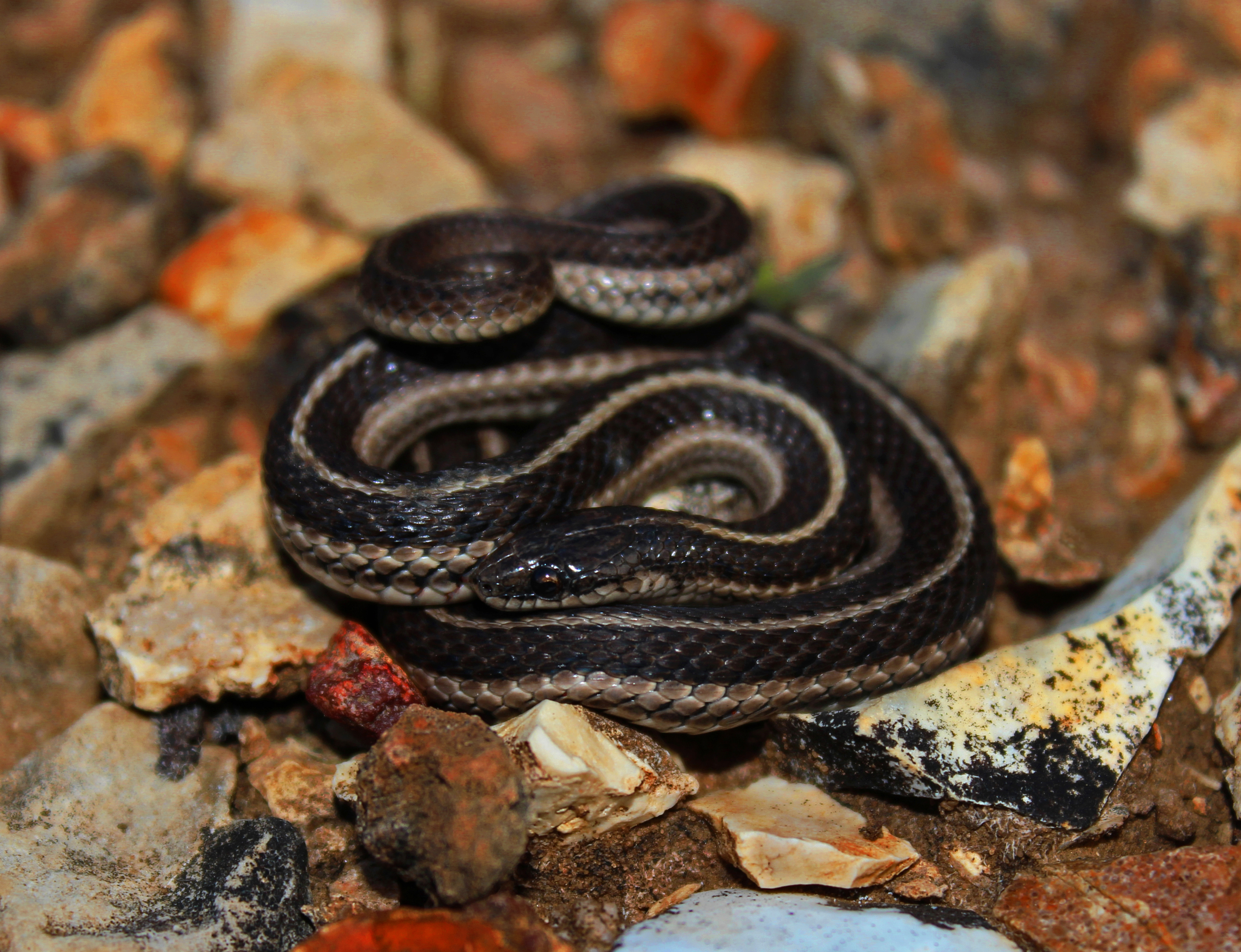
- Lined snake (Tropidoclonion lineatum)
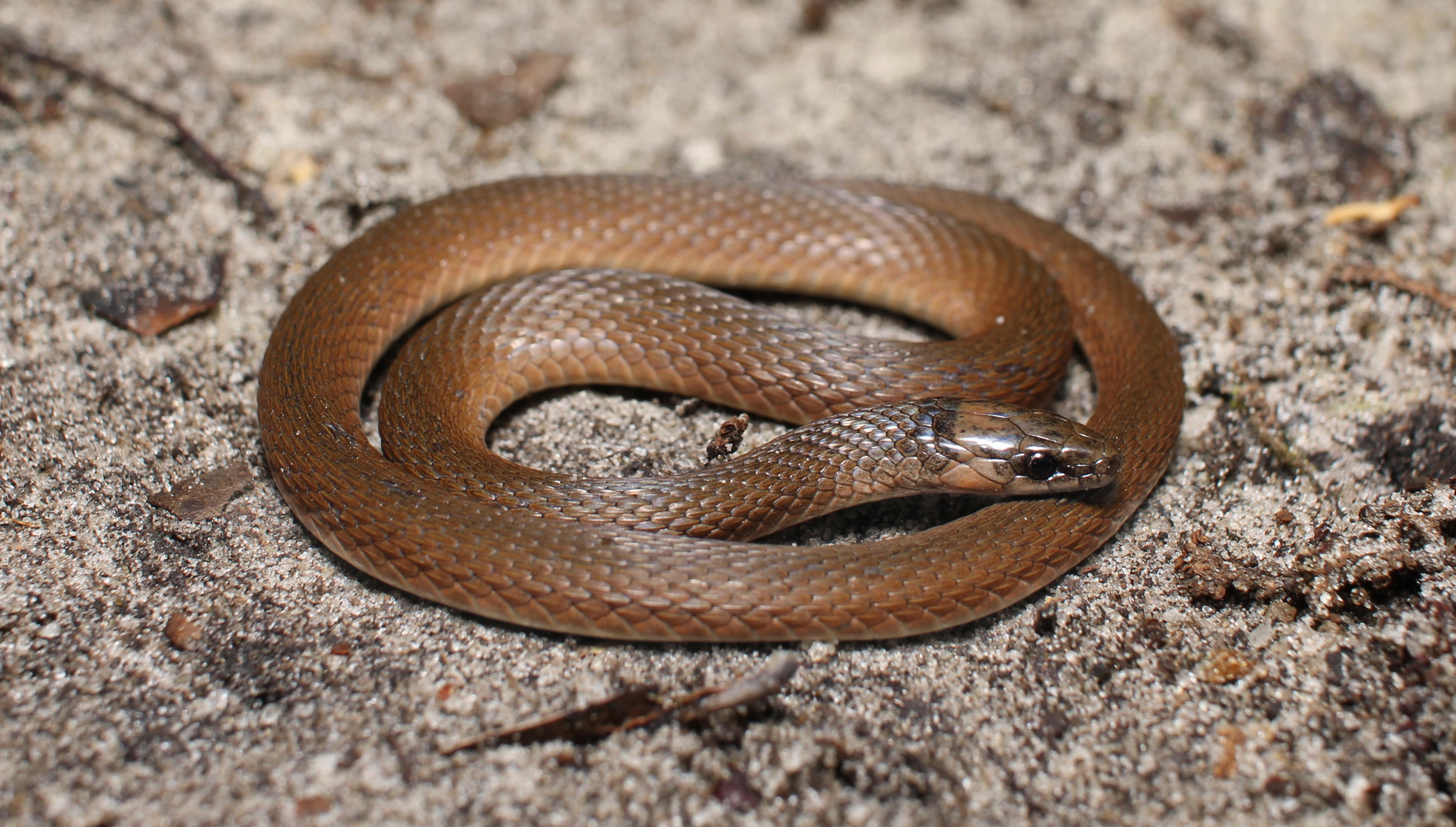
- Rough earth snake (Virginia striatula)
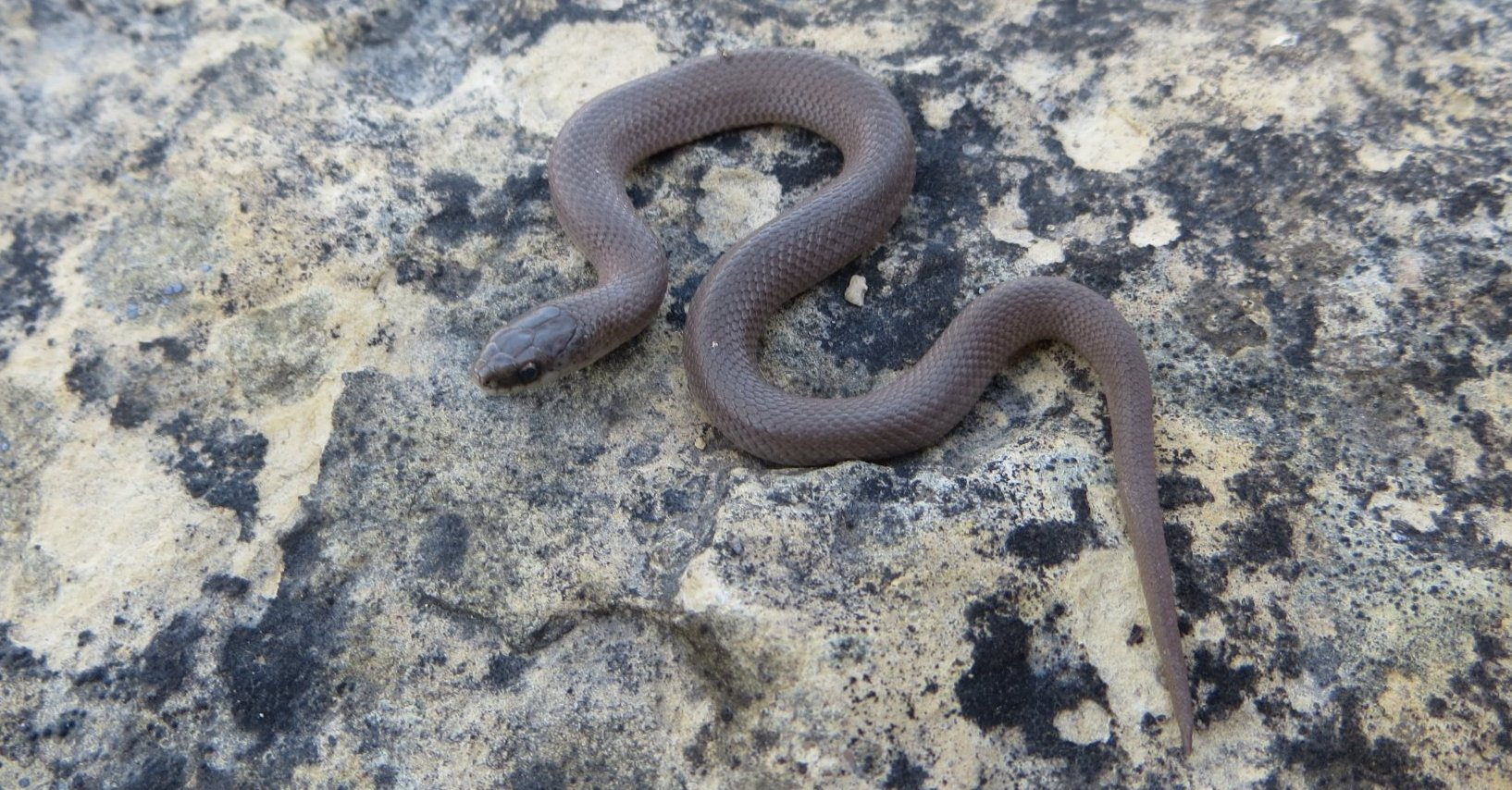
- Smooth earth snake (Virginia valeriae)
