= Index of Kansas-related articles =

The location of the state of Kansas in the United States

The following is an alphabetical list of articles related to the U.S. state of Kansas.

== 0–9 ==
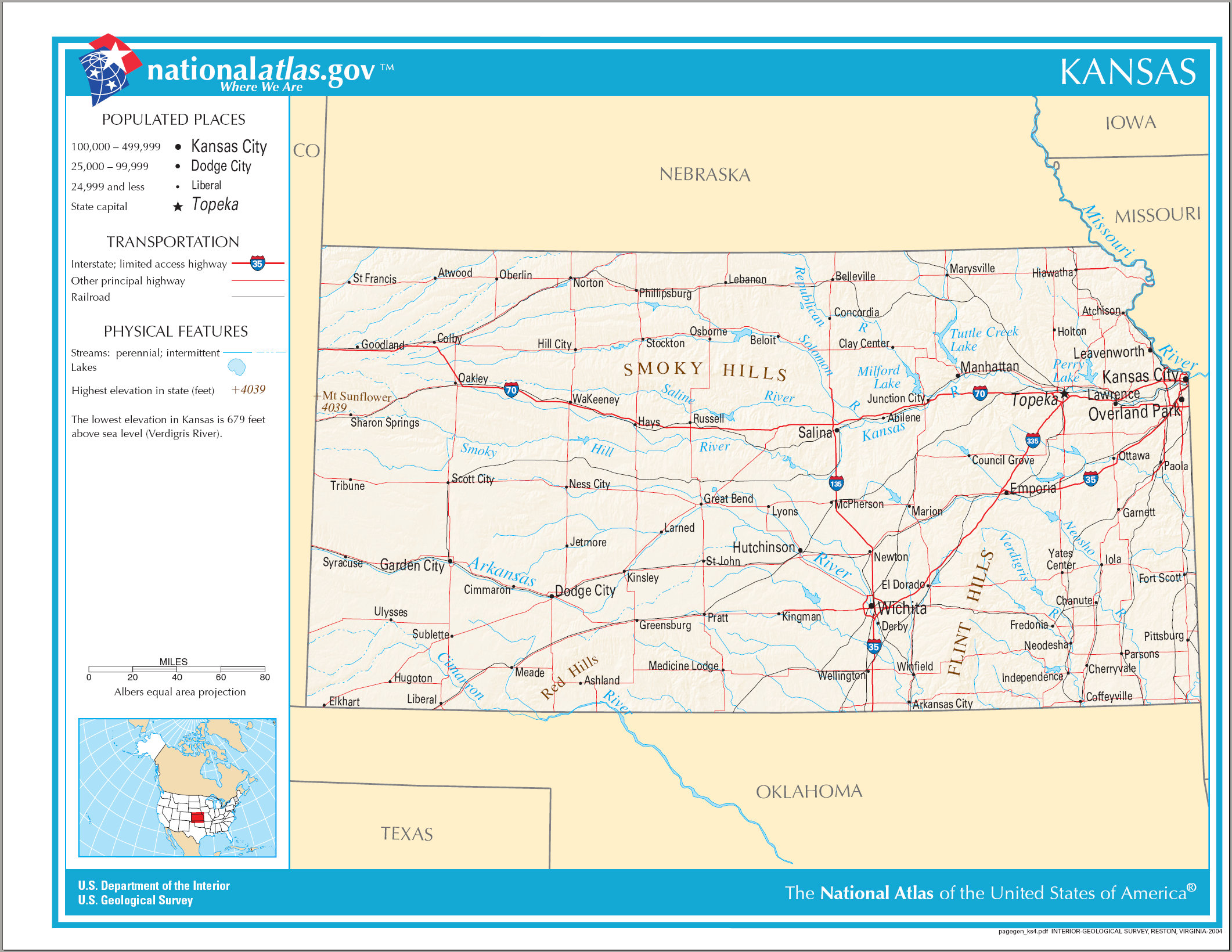
An enlargeable map of the state of Kansas

- 25th meridian west from Washington

== A ==
- Abortion in Kansas
- Adams-Onís Treaty of 1819
- Adjacent states:
  - State of Colorado
  - State of Missouri
  - State of Nebraska
  - State of Oklahoma
- Agriculture
  - corn
  - Kansas Department of Agriculture
  - Wheat
  - Wine in Kansas
- airports
- Alcohol laws of Kansas
- American Civil War
  - Kansas military units
- American West
  - "Old West" or "Wild West"
- Amusement parks in Kansas
- Arboreta in Kansas
  - commons:Category:Arboreta in Kansas
- Archaeology of Kansas
  - Category:Archaeological sites in Kansas
    - commons:Category:Archaeological sites in Kansas
- Architecture of Kansas
- area codes, telephone: 316, 620, 785, 913
- Arkansas River
- Art museums and galleries in Kansas
  - commons:Category:Art museums and galleries in Kansas
- Astronomy
  - Astronomical observatories in Kansas
    - commons:Category:Astronomical observatories in Kansas
  - Haviland Crater
- attorneys general (category)
- attractions (category)
- aviation

== B ==
- Baby Jay
- Battle of Baxter Springs
- Battle of Marais des Cygnes
- Battle of Mine Creek
- Big Red One
- birds
- Bleeding Kansas
- (Kansas) Board of Regents
- boarding schools (category)
- Boeing
- Botanical gardens in Kansas
  - commons:Category:Botanical gardens in Kansas
- Boy Scouts of America
  - Scouting in Kansas
- bridges (category)
- Brown v. Board of Education of Topeka
- Buildings and structures in Kansas
  - commons:Category:Buildings and structures in Kansas
- business
  see economy

== C ==
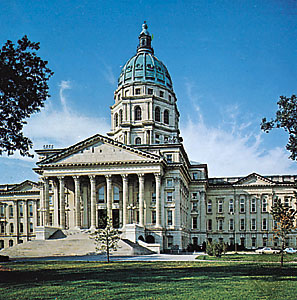
The Kansas State Capitol in Topeka

- Cannabis in Kansas
- Capital of the State of Kansas
- Capital punishment
  - executions by the state
- Capitol of the State of Kansas
  - commons:Category:Kansas State Capitol
  - First Territorial Capitol of Kansas
- Cemeteries
- Census
  - Census-designated places (category)
  - Census statistical areas
- Cherokee Strip
- Chisholm Trail
- Churches (category)
- Cinemas (category)
- Cities
  - County seats
  - fictional (category)
  - former (category)
  - ghost towns (category)
  - state capital
  - unincorporated communities (category)
- Climate of Kansas
- Climate change in Kansas
- colleges
  - community colleges
  - Kansas Board of Regents
- Combined Statistical Areas (CSAs)
- Communications in Kansas
  - commons:Category:Communications in Kansas
- companies based in Kansas (category)
- congressional districts
  U.S. House of Representatives (District 1, 2, 3, 4, 5, 6, 7, 8)
- congressmen
  - state (category)
  - United States
- corn
- counties
  - commons:Category:Counties in Kansas
- craters
  - Haviland crater
- crime (category)
- crops
  see agriculture and other individual topics
- culture (category)
  - festivals (category)
  - museums (category)
  - restaurants (category)

== D ==
- Dodge City Community College
- Dodge City
- dams
- Demographics of Kansas
- desegregation
- disasters (category)
  see also natural disasters
- Dust Bowl

== E ==
- Economy of Kansas
  - Category:Economy of Kansas
    - commons:Category:Economy of Kansas
  - companies based in Kansas (category)
  - locations by per capita income
- Education in Kansas
  - Category:Education in Kansas
    - commons:Category:Education in Kansas
  - boarding schools (category)
  - colleges and universities
  - elementary schools (category)
  - high schools
  - Kansas Board of Regents
  - law schools (category)
  - middle schools (category)
  - unified school districts (USD)
- Eisenhower, President Dwight D.
  - biography
  - Eisenhower Presidential Center
- Category:Elections in Kansas
  - commons:Category:Elections in Kansas
- elementary schools (category)
- energy
  - infrastructure (category)
  - Hugoton Natural Gas Area
  - wind power
- Environment of Kansas
  - commons:Category:Environment of Kansas
- evolution hearings
- executions
- Exodusters

== F ==
The flag of the state of Kansas

- Farming
- Festivals in Kansas
  - Kansas State Fair
  - commons:Category:Festivals in Kansas
- Fiction
  - Fictional characters from Kansas (category)
  - Films set in Kansas
  - Television shows set in Kansas (category)
- Flag of the state of Kansas
- Flora of Kansas (category)
- Forts in Kansas
  - Category:Forts in Kansas
    - commons:Category:Forts in Kansas

== G ==
The Great Seal of the State of Kansas

- gardens, botanical (category)
- Geography of Kansas
  - Category:Geography of Kansas
    - commons:Category:Geography of Kansas
- Geology of Kansas
  - Category:Geology of Kansas
    - commons:Category:Geology of Kansas
- Ghost towns in Kansas
  - Category:Ghost towns in Kansas
    - commons:Category:Ghost towns in Kansas
- Golf clubs and courses in Kansas
- Government of the state of Kansas website
  - Category:Government of Kansas
    - commons:Category:Government of Kansas
- government agencies
  - Kansas Board of Regents
  - Kansas Department of Agriculture
  - Kansas Highway Patrol
  - state agencies (category)
  - State Library of Kansas
- Governor of the State of Kansas
  - List of governors of Kansas
- Great Plains
- Great Seal of the State of Kansas

== H ==
- Hamilton Quarry
- Haviland crater
- Heritage railroads in Kansas
  - commons:Category:Heritage railroads in Kansas
- High Plains
- high schools
- Highway routes in Kansas
  - Interstate (category)
  - Kansas Highway Patrol
  - state
  - U.S. (category)
- Highway Patrol of Kansas
- Hiking trails in Kansas
  - commons:Category:Hiking trails in Kansas
- historic places
  - forts (category)
  - registered places
- historical figures
- History of Kansas
  - Historical outline of Kansas
    - Category:History of Kansas
      - commons:Category:History of Kansas
- hospitals
- hotels (category)

== I ==
- Images of Kansas
  - commons:Category:Kansas
- Interstate highways (category)
- Islands in Kansas

== J ==
- judges
  - state supreme court justices (category)

== K ==
- Kansas website
  - Category:Kansas
    - commons:Category:Kansas
      - commons:Category:Maps of Kansas
- Kansas Board of Regents
- Kansas City Track Association
- Kansas Department of Agriculture
- Kansas Forts and Posts
- Kansas Highway Patrol
- Kansas–Nebraska Act
- Kansas one room school
- Kansas River
- Kansas Speedway
- Kansas State Capitol
- Kansas State Fair
- Kansas Supreme Court
- Kansas Territory
- Kansas Turnpike
- Kansas University Rangers
- Kansas Women Attorneys Association
- Kaw
- KS – United States Postal Service postal code for the State of Kansas

== L ==
- Lakes, reservoirs, and dams in Kansas
  - Category:Lakes of Kansas
    - commons:Category:Lakes of Kansas
- landforms (category)
- Landmarks in Kansas
  - Category:Landmarks in Kansas
    - commons:Category:Landmarks in Kansas
- law
  - alcohol laws
  - Brown v. Board of Education of Topeka
  - crime (category)
  - desegregation
  - executions by the state
  - Kansas–Nebraska Act
  - law schools (category)
  - lawyers (category)
  - state laws (category)
- law enforcement
  - Kansas Attorneys General (category)
  - Kansas Highway Patrol
  - state prisons
- Lecompton, Kansas Territory, disputed territorial capital 1856-1861
- Lecompton Constitution
- LGBT rights in Kansas
- Lists related to the State of Kansas:
  - List of airports in Kansas
  - List of census statistical areas in Kansas
  - List of cities in Kansas
  - List of colleges and universities in Kansas
  - List of companies in Kansas
  - List of counties in Kansas
  - List of dams and reservoirs in Kansas
  - List of forts in Kansas
  - List of ghost towns in Kansas
  - List of governors of Kansas
  - List of high schools in Kansas
  - List of highway routes in Kansas
  - List of hospitals in Kansas
  - List of individuals executed in Kansas
  - List of islands in Kansas
  - List of lakes in Kansas
  - List of law enforcement agencies in Kansas
  - List of museums in Kansas
  - List of National Historic Landmarks in Kansas
  - List of newspapers in Kansas
  - List of people from Kansas
  - List of places in Kansas
  - List of power stations in Kansas
  - List of radio stations in Kansas
  - List of railroads in Kansas
  - List of Registered Historic Places in Kansas
  - List of rivers of Kansas
  - List of school districts in Kansas
  - List of state parks in Kansas
  - List of state prisons in Kansas
  - List of symbols of the State of Kansas
  - List of television stations in Kansas
  - List of Kansas's congressional delegations
  - List of United States congressional districts in Kansas
  - List of United States representatives from Kansas
  - List of United States senators from Kansas
- literature
  - writers (category)
- Louisiana Purchase of 1803

== M ==
- malls (category)
- Maps of Kansas
  - commons:Category:Maps of Kansas
- mass media (category)
- mayors (category)
- meadowlark
- metropolitan areas
  - Kansas City Metropolitan Area
  - Metropolitan Statistical Areas (MSAs)
- middle schools (category)
- Midwestern United States
- military
  - Big Red One
  - Civil War units
  - facilities (category)
  - forts (category)
- Missouri River
- Monuments and memorials in Kansas
  - commons:Category:Monuments and memorials in Kansas
- Mount Sunflower
- movie theatres (category)
- municipal universities
- Museums in Kansas
  - Category:Museums in Kansas
    - commons:Category:Museums in Kansas
- Music of Kansas
  - commons:Category:Music of Kansas
  - Category:Musical groups from Kansas
  - Category:Musicians from Kansas
  - Category:Music venues in Kansas

== N ==
- National Wildlife Refuges (category)
- Native American tribes (category)
- Natural arches of Kansas
  - commons:Category:Natural arches of Kansas
- natural disasters (category)
  - tornadoes (category)
- Natural gas pipelines in Kansas
- Natural history of Kansas
  - commons:Category:Natural history of Kansas
- naval ships
  - USS Kansas
  - USS Topeka
- newspapers

== O ==
- observatories, astronomical (category)
- Office of the Kansas Securities Commissioner
- Old West
- Oregon Trail
- Outdoor sculptures in Kansas
  - commons:Category:Outdoor sculptures in Kansas
- Ozarks

== P ==
- parks
  - amusement (category)
  - state parks
  - zoological (category)
- Pawnee, Kansas Territory, first territorial capital 1855
- People from Kansas
  - List of lists of people from Kansas
  - Category:People from Kansas
    - commons:Category:People from Kansas
    - Category:People from Kansas by populated place
    - Category:People from Kansas by county
    - Category:People from Kansas by occupation
- Places in Kansas
- politicians (category)
- Politics of Kansas
  - commons:Category:Politics of Kansas
- preparatory schools (category)
- President Dwight D. Eisenhower
  - biography
  - Eisenhower Presidential Center
- prisons, state
- Protected areas of Kansas
  - commons:Category:Protected areas of Kansas

== R ==
- radio stations
- Railroad museums in Kansas
  - commons:Category:Railroad museums in Kansas
- railroads
- recreational areas (category)
- regions (category)
- Registered Historic Places
- Religion in Kansas
  - commons:Category:Religion in Kansas
  - cemeteries (category)
  - churches (category)
- Republican Party of Kansas
- reservoirs
- restaurants (category)
- Right Between the Ears
- rivers
- Rock formations in Kansas
  - commons:Category:Rock formations in Kansas

== S ==
- Same-sex marriage in Kansas
- Santa Fe Trail
  - Santa Fe Trail Remains
- schools
  see education
- Scouting in Kansas
- seal
- senators
  - State (category)
  - United States
- Settlements in Kansas
  - Cities in Kansas
  - Townships in Kansas
  - Census Designated Places in Kansas
  - Other unincorporated communities in Kansas
  - List of ghost towns in Kansas
- Shawnee Mission, Kansas Territory, territorial capital 1855-1856
- Ships of the U.S. Navy, USS Kansas
- Shopping malls (category)
- Snakes (category)
- Solar power in Kansas
- Sports in Kansas
  - commons:Category:Sports in Kansas
- Sports venues in Kansas
  - commons:Category:Sports venues in Kansas
- state highways
- State of Kansas website
  - Government of the State of Kansas
    - Category:Government of Kansas
      - commons:Category:Government of Kansas
- state parks
- state prisons
- state supreme court justices (category)
- state universities
- Structures in Kansas
  - commons:Category:Buildings and structures in Kansas
- Sunflower
- Symbols of the State of Kansas website
  - Kansas state amphibian: barred tiger salamander (Ambystoma mavortium)
  - Kansas state bird: western meadowlark (Sturnella neglecta)
  - Kansas state fish: channel catfish (Ictalurus punctatus)
  - Kansas state flag: Flag of the State of Kansas
  - Kansas state flower: wild sunflower (Helianthus annuus)
  - Kansas state insect: western honey bee (Apis mellifera mellifera)
  - Kansas state mammal: American bison (Bison bison)
  - Kansas state motto: Ad astra per aspera (Latin for To the stars through difficulties)
  - Kansas state nickname: Sunflower State
  - Kansas state reptile: ornate box turtle (Terrapene ornata ornata)
  - Kansas state seal: Great Seal of the State of Kansas
  - Kansas state soil: Harney silt loam website (unofficial)
  - Kansas state song: "Home on the Range"
  - Kansas state tree: plains cottonwood (Populus sargentii)
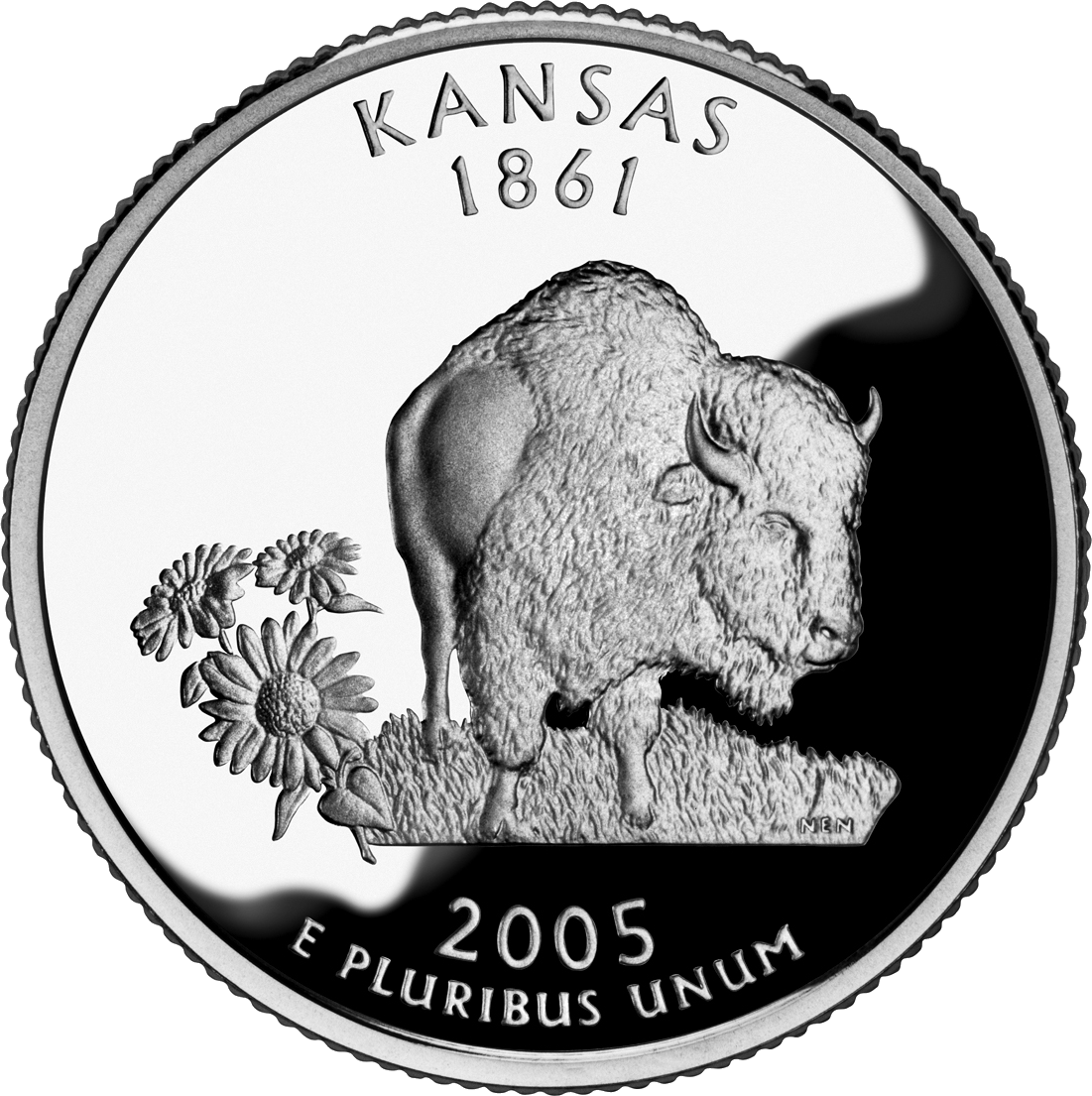
  - United States quarter dollar - Kansas 2005

== T ==
- Telecommunications in Kansas
  - commons:Category:Communications in Kansas
- Telephone area codes in Kansas
  - 316, 620, 785, 913
- television
  - personalities (category)
  - stations
  - television shows set in Kansas (category)
- Territory of Kansas, 1854–1861
- Territory of Louisiana, 1805–1812
- Territory of Missouri, 1812–1821
- Theatres in Kansas
  - commons:Category:Theatres in Kansas
  - Category:Cinemas and movie theaters in Kansas
- Topeka, Kansas, territorial and state capital since 1856
- tornadoes (category)
- Tourism in Kansas website
  - commons:Category:Tourism in Kansas
- townships (category)
- trails, hiking (category)
- Transportation in Kansas
  - Category:Transportation in Kansas
    - commons:Category:Transport in Kansas
- Treaty of Guadalupe Hidalgo of 1848
- 25th meridian west from Washington

== U ==
- Unified school districts (USD)
- Unincorporated communities (category)
  - Census-designated places (category)
  - Ghost towns (category)
- United States of America
  - States of the United States of America
  - United States census statistical areas of Kansas
  - Kansas's congressional delegations
  - United States congressional districts in Kansas
  - United States Court of Appeals for the Tenth Circuit
  - United States District Court for the District of Kansas
  - United States representatives from Kansas
  - United States senators from Kansas
- Universities
- U.S. Highways (category)
- U.S. military facilities (category)
- U.S. Route 66
- US-KS – ISO 3166-2:US region code for the State of Kansas
- USS Kansas
- USS Topeka

== W ==
- water companies
- Water parks in Kansas
- wheat
  Wikimedia
  - Wikimedia Commons:Category:Kansas
    - commons:Category:Maps of Kansas
  - Wikinews:Category:Kansas
    - Wikinews:Portal:Kansas
  - Wikipedia Category:Kansas
    - Wikipedia Portal:Kansas
    - Wikipedia:WikiProject Kansas
      - Category:WikiProject Kansas articles
      - Category:WikiProject Kansas participants
- wildlife
  - birds
  - cougar
  - coyote
  - hunting
  - meadowlark
  - National Wildlife Refuges (category)
  - pronghorn
  - snakes
  - white-tailed deer
  - zoos (category)
- Wild West
- Wind power in Kansas
- Wine in Kansas
- Wolf Creek Nuclear Generating Station
- writers (category)

== Y ==
- youth
  - Scouting

== Z ==
- Zoos in Kansas
  - commons:Category:Zoos in Kansas

== See also ==
- Topic overview:
  - Kansas
  - Outline of Kansas
