= Weskan Township, Kansas =

Township in Wallace County, Kansas, U.S.

Weskan Township
- Township
- Location within Wallace County
- Coordinates: 38.888455°N 101.937548°W
- Country: United States
- State: Kansas
- County: Wallace

Area
  - Total: 302.518 sq mi (783.52 km^{2})
  - Land: 302.499 sq mi (783.47 km^{2})
  - Water: 0.019 sq mi (0.049 km^{2}) 0.01%

Population (2020)
  - Total: 329
  - Density: 1.09/sq mi (0.420/km^{2})
- Time zone: UTC-7 (MST)
  - Summer (DST): UTC-6 (MDT)
- Area code: 785
- GNIS feature ID: 485219

Weskan Township is a township in Wallace County, Kansas, United States. As of the 2020 census, its population was 329.

== History ==
A former township in Wallace County, named Vega Township, was split between other townships in the 1890s. What remained of it was made into Stockholm Township. Stockholm Township would be annexed by Weskan Township in the 1950s. Another township, Morton Township, was split between Weskan Township and Sharon Springs Township in 1981.

== Geography ==
Weskan Township covers an area of 302.518 square miles (783.52 km^{2}), 0.01% of it water. The Smoky Hill River flows through it, as well as Willow Creek. Weskan Township is home to the highest point in the state of Kansas, Mount Sunflower.

=== Communities ===
- Weskan

=== Adjacent townships ===
McPherson Township, Sherman County
Kit Carson County, Colorado	northwest	north
Cheyenne County, Colorado	west	self	east	Sharon Springs Township, Wallace County
		south
Tribune Township, Greeley County

== Transportation ==
=== Major highways ===
- US-40

== Demographics ==
As of the 2020 census, the township had a population of 167, giving a population density of 0.886 people per square mile (0.342 people/km^{2}). The racial makeup of the township was 91.2% White, 0.3% Black or African American, 0.3% Native American, 0.3% Pacific Islander, 3.0% from some other race, and 4.9% from two or more races. Hispanics or Latinos of any race were 5.8% of the population.

The 2020–2024 American Community Survey estimated that the township contained 126 households and 157 housing units.
