= Kracht Castle Island =

Coordinates: 38°59′55.2078″N 96°52′9.4512″W

Kracht Castle Island is a castle built by Don Kratch, a retired math teacher, on a man-made island outside Junction City, Kansas. Started in the 1990s he has worked by himself to build the castle as a hobby.

== See also ==
- List of Kansas landmarks
