= Montgomery County Council =

Montgomery County Council may be:

- Montgomery County Council (Alabama)
- Montgomery County Council (Kansas)
- Montgomery County Council (Maryland)
- Montgomery County Council (New York)
- Montgomeryshire, Wales (1889-1974)
