= USS Kansas City =

USS Kansas City may refer to the following ships of the United States Navy:

- Kansas City (CA-128) was to have been a heavy cruiser, but was canceled due to the end of World War II, just days after being laid down
- USS Kansas City (AOR-3) was a replenishment oiler in service from 1970 to 1994
- USS Kansas City (LCS-22) is an Independence-class littoral combat ship

== See also ==
- USS Kansas
