= Lists of places in Kansas =

These are lists of places in the U.S. state of Kansas.

== Lists ==
=== Communities ===
- List of counties in Kansas
- List of townships in Kansas
- List of cities in Kansas
- List of unincorporated communities in Kansas
- List of ghost towns in Kansas

=== Landmarks ===
- List of Kansas landmarks
- List of Kansas rivers
- List of Kansas state parks
- List of lakes, reservoirs, and dams in Kansas
- List of museums in Kansas
- List of Registered Historic Places in Kansas
- List of hospitals in Kansas
- List of Kansas state prisons

==== Schools ====
- List of high schools in Kansas
- List of unified school districts in Kansas
- List of colleges and universities in Kansas
- List of defunct colleges and universities in Kansas
- List of oldest buildings on Kansas colleges and universities

=== People ===
- List of people from Kansas

== Topical lists ==
- List of Kansas county name etymologies
- Kansas locations by per capita income
