= Climate change in Kansas =

Climate change in the US state of Kansas

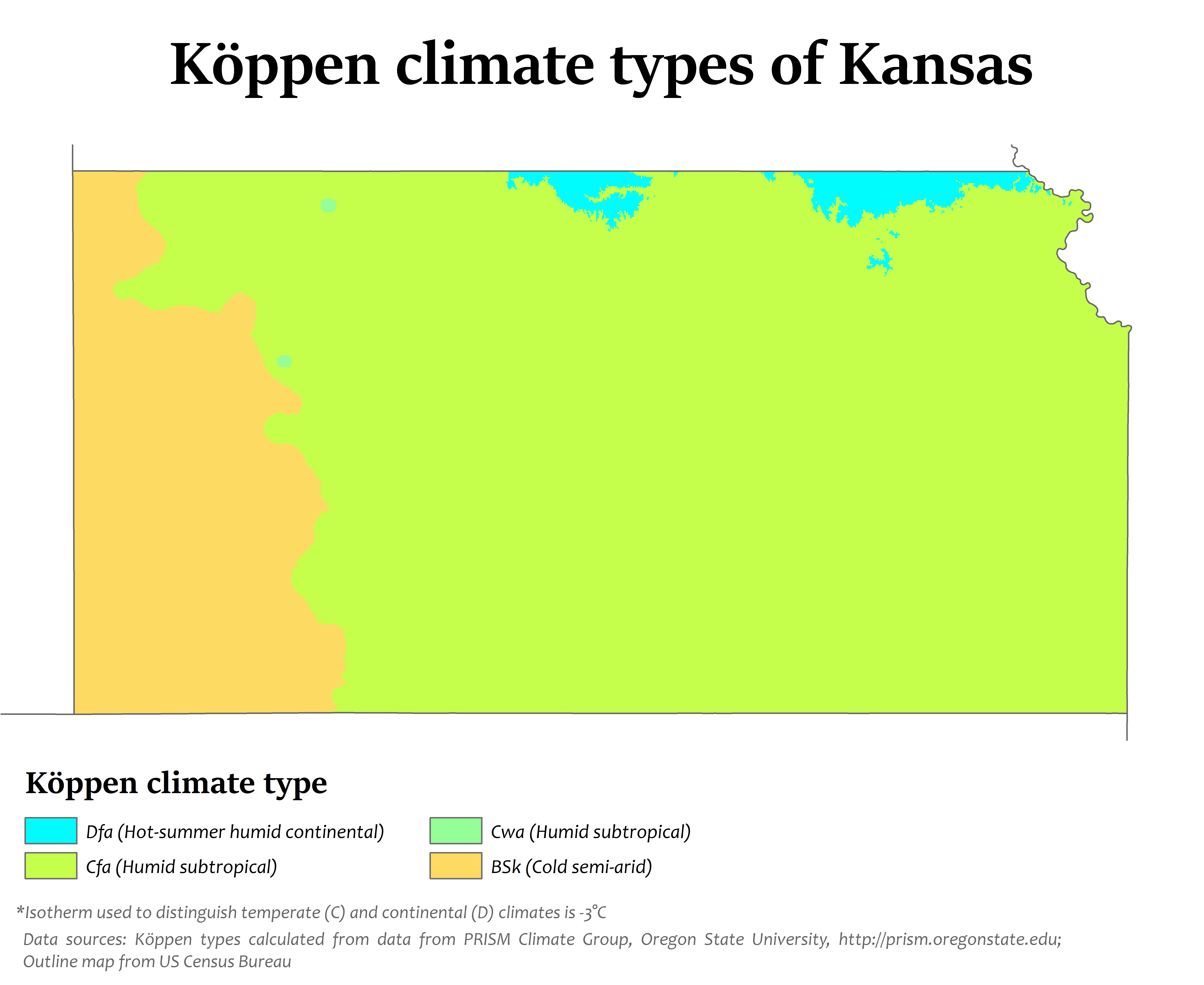
Köppen climate types in Kansas, showing that the climate of the state is now primarily humid subtropical.

Climate change in Kansas encompasses the effects of climate change, attributed to man-made increases in atmospheric carbon dioxide, in the U.S. state of Kansas.

In May 2019, The Kansas City Star noted recent findings suggesting that "climate change in Kansas, Missouri and elsewhere could eventually lead to thunderstorms that are wetter and perhaps more violent, flooding ... and more droughts". The United States Environmental Protection Agency (EPA) reports "Kansas's climate is changing. In the past century, most of the state has warmed by at least half a degree (F). The soil is becoming drier. Rainstorms are becoming more intense, and floods are becoming more severe. Warming winters and changes in the timing and size of rainfall events have altered crop yields. In the coming decades, summers are likely to become increasingly hot and dry, creating problems for agriculture and possibly human health.

== Precipitation and water resources ==
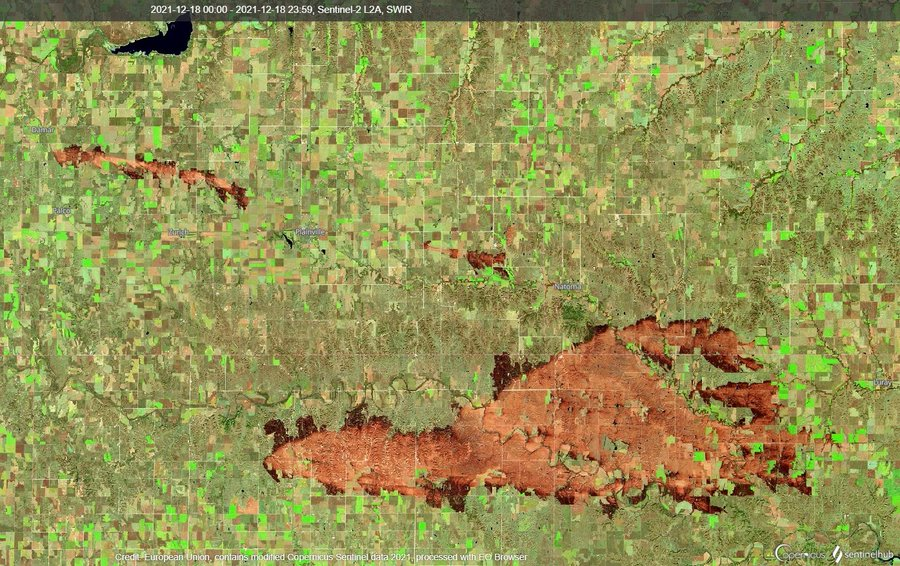
Burn scars from 2021 wildfires

According to the EPA "Changing climate is likely to increase the demand for water but make it less available. Soils have become drier over the last several decades, and they are likely to continue to become drier as warmer temperatures increase evaporation and water use by plants. Average rainfall during the summer is likely to decrease. Seventy years from now, the longest period without rain each year is likely to be three or four days longer than today. Warmer temperatures and drier soils are also likely to decrease the average flow of rivers and streams, because drier soil retains more water when it rains".

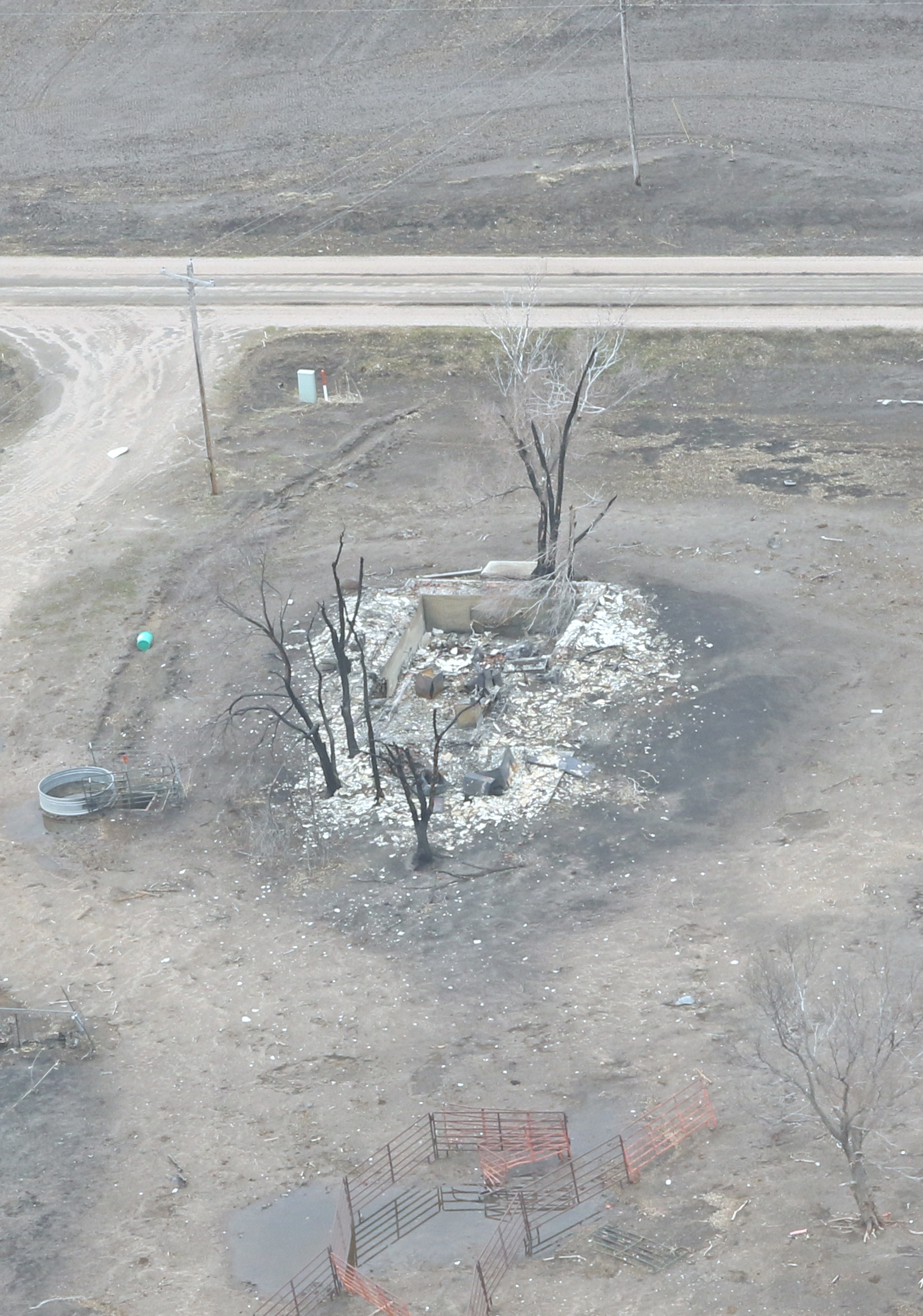
Farmstead burned down by the Road 702 wildfire, May 2022

According to the EPA "Drier soils will increase the need for farmers to irrigate their crops, but sufficient water might not be available. Approximately 22 percent of the farmland in Kansas is irrigated, mostly with ground water from the High Plains Aquifer System. As a result, this aquifer is becoming depleted. Since the 1950s, the amount of water stored in the aquifer has declined by more than 25 percent in many parts of the state".

According to the EPA "Decreased river flows can create problems for navigation, recreation, public water supplies, and electric power generation. Commercial navigation can be suspended during droughts when there is too little water to keep channels deep enough for barge traffic. Decreased river flows can also lower the water level in lakes and reservoirs, which may limit municipal water supplies and impair swimming, fishing, and other recreational activities. Although the state has only one hydroelectric dam, conventional power plants also need adequate water for cooling. Compounding the problem, rising temperatures are expected to increase the demand for electricity for air conditioning".

== Agriculture ==
According to the EPA "Rising temperatures, drier soils, and decreasing water availability are likely to present challenges for Kansas farms. Yields would decline by about 50 percent in fields that can no longer be irrigated. Even where ample water is available, higher temperatures would reduce yields of corn. Increased concentrations of carbon dioxide, however, may increase yields of wheat and soybean enough to offset the impact of higher temperature. Although warmer and shorter winters may allow for a longer growing season, they may also promote the growth of weeds and pests, and shorten the dormancy for many winter crops, which could increase crop losses during spring freezes. The early flowering of winter wheat could have negative repercussions on livestock farmers who depend on it for feed. Livestock themselves may also be affected by more intense heat waves and lack of water. Hot weather causes cows to eat less, grow more slowly, and produce less milk, and it can threaten their health".

In 2019, Kansas farmers were growing cotton where they once grew wheat.

== Rainstorms and tornadoes ==
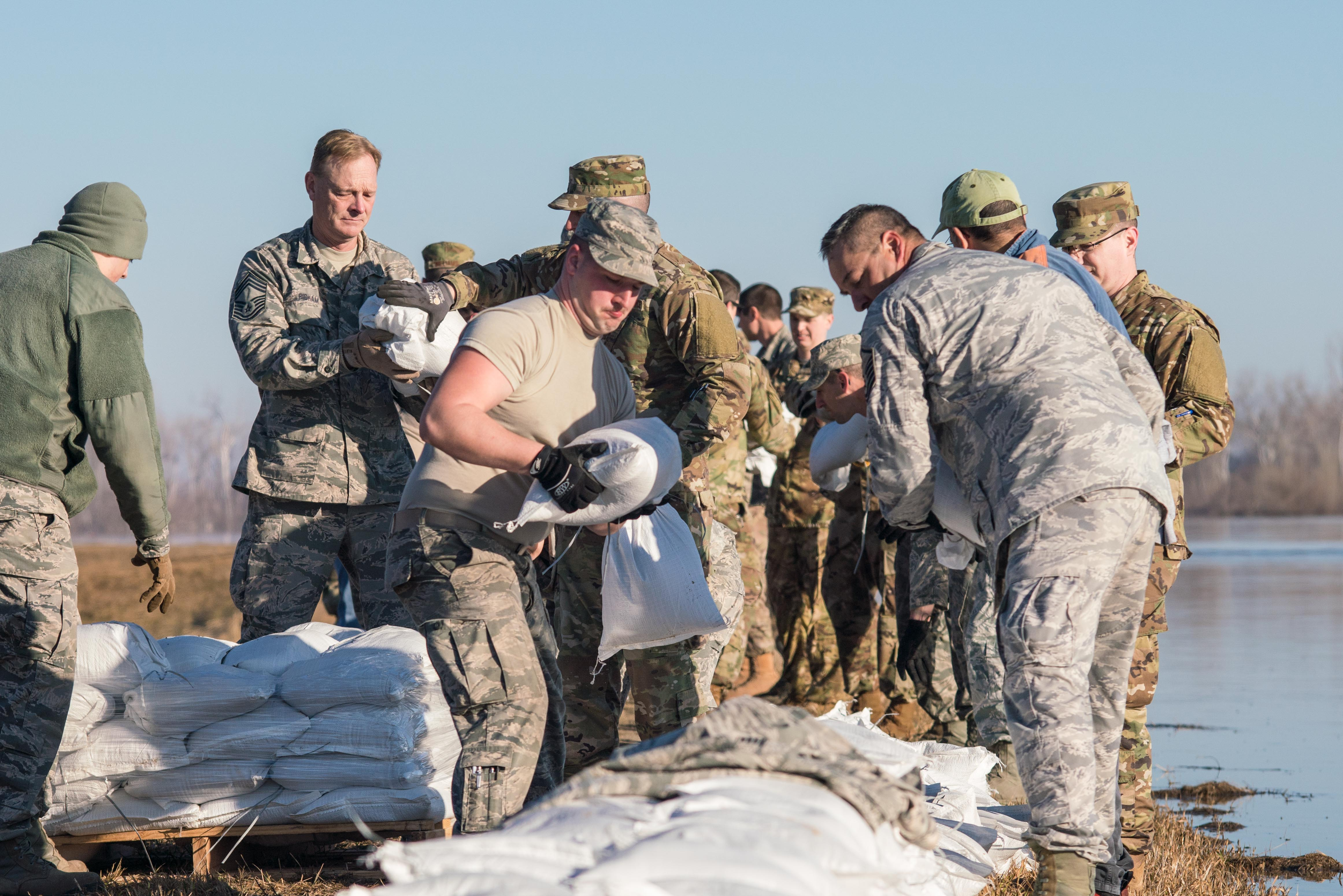
Levee construction during flooding in Elwood, March 2019

According to the EPA "Although summer droughts are likely to become more severe, floods may also intensify. During the last 50 years, the amount of rain falling during the wettest four days of the year has increased about 15 percent in the Great Plains. River levels associated with flooding have increased in eastern Kansas. Over the next several decades, the amount of rainfall during the wettest days of the year is likely to continue to increase, which would increase flooding".

According to the EPA "Scientists do not know how the frequency and severity of tornadoes will change. Rising concentrations of greenhouse gases tend to increase humidity, and thus atmospheric instability, which would encourage tornadoes. But wind shear is likely to decrease, which would discourage tornadoes. Research is ongoing to learn whether tornadoes will be more or less frequent in the future. Because Kansas experiences about 100 tornadoes a year, such research is closely followed by meteorologists in the state". The Kansas City Star also noted that although it was not yet possible to say whether climate change was contributing to the increasing number of tornadoes in the region, "the band of states in the central United States ... that each spring are ravaged by hundreds of tornadoes — is not disappearing. But it seems to be expanding".

== See also ==
- List of U.S. states and territories by carbon dioxide emissions
- Plug-in electric vehicles in Kansas
