= List of films set in Kansas =

Kansas Saloon Smashers (1901)

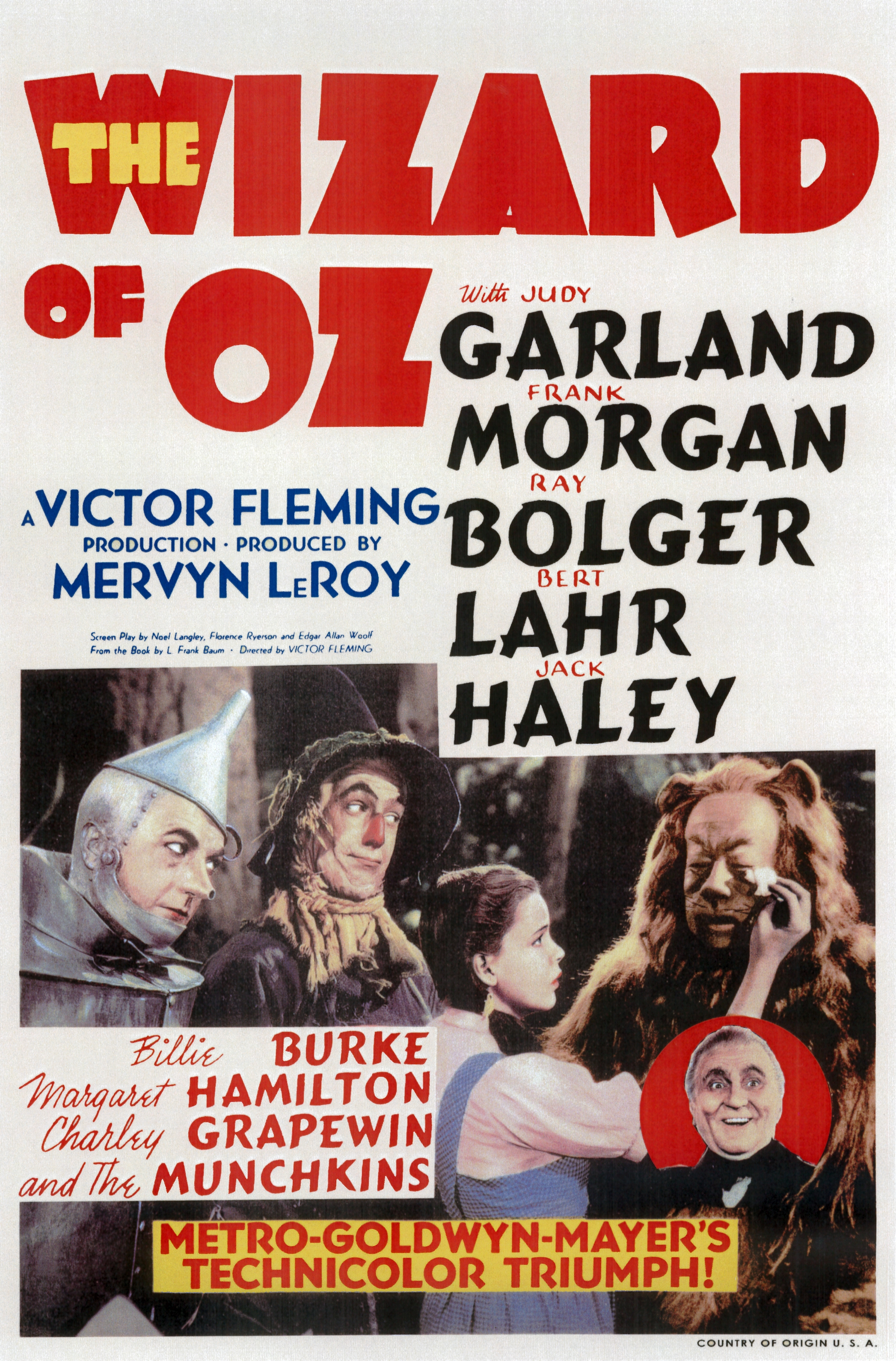
Original poster for The Wizard of Oz (1939)

Kansas, in the geographic center of the United States, has a rich history connected with the American Old West and with the American Civil War ("Bleeding Kansas"), including the history of the notorious guerrilla commander William Quantrill. The following is a partial chronological list of major motion pictures set in Kansas.

Three of the listed films have won the Academy Award for Best Picture.

Film title	Release year	Notes/subject matter	National Film Registry
Kansas Saloon Smashers	1901	silent film: based on Carrie Nation	
The Wonderful Wizard of Oz	1910	silent film: earliest surviving film version of Oz	
A Modern Musketeer	1917	Silent film	
Naughty, Naughty!	1918	Silent film	
Wild Bill Hickok	1923	Silent film	
Tumbleweeds	1925	Silent film	
Wizard of Oz	1925	Silent film: features Oliver Hardy as Tin Man	
Free and Easy	1930		
The Big Trail	1930		✓
Cimarron	1931	Academy Award for Best Picture	
Movie Crazy	1932		
Silver Dollar	1932	starring Edward G. Robinson	
The Plainsman	1936		
Pick a Star	1937		
The Texans	1938	story of the Chisholm Trail	
Jesse James	1939		
Dodge City	1939	stars Errol Flynn, Olivia de Havilland	
Union Pacific	1939		
The Wizard of Oz	1939		✓
Dark Command	1940		
The Return of Frank James	1940		
Santa Fe Trail	1940	features Ronald Reagan as Custer	
Sheriff of Tombstone	1941		
Heaven Can Wait	1943	stars Gene Tierney, Don Ameche	
The Kansan	1943		
The Woman of the Town	1943		
Abilene Town	1946		
The Harvey Girls	1946		
Trail Street	1947		
The Walls of Jericho	1948		
Red River	1948		✓
Kansas Raiders	1950		
Winchester '73	1950		✓
The Cimarron Kid	1952		
Kansas Pacific	1953		
The Stranger Wore a Gun	1953		
Masterson of Kansas	1954		
Picnic	1955		
Seven Angry Men	1955	based on abolitionist John Brown	
Wichita	1955		
The Rainmaker	1956		
Gunfight at the O.K. Corral	1957		
The Jayhawkers!	1959		
Splendor in the Grass	1961	Oscar for best writing for William Inge	
Cheyenne Autumn	1964		
The Ghost and Mr. Chicken	1966	Don Knotts comedy	
Jesse James Meets Frankenstein's Daughter	1966		
The Plainsman	1966		
Gunfight in Abilene	1967	Bobby Darin stars in non-singing role	
In Cold Blood	1967		✓
Angel in My Pocket	1969		
The Gypsy Moths	1969		
The Learning Tree	1969		✓
Prime Cut	1972		
Ace Eli and Rodger of the Skies	1973		
Paper Moon	1973		
Journey Back to Oz	1974	animated film	
A Boy and His Dog	1975	set in post-apocalyptic Topeka, stars Don Johnson	
The Great Waldo Pepper	1975		
King Kung Fu	1976		
Superman	1978	set in fictional Smallville	✓
Good Luck, Miss Wyckoff	1979		
The Attic	1980		
Americana	1983		
The Day After	1983	originally aired on television	
Superman III	1983		
Return to Oz	1985		
Critters	1986		
Planes, Trains and Automobiles	1987		
Kansas	1988		
Dances with Wolves	1990	Academy Award for Best Picture	✓
Sarah, Plain and Tall	1991	originally aired on television	
Unforgiven	1992	Academy Award for Best Picture	✓
Leap of Faith	1992		
Dennis the Menace	1993	based on cartoon set in Wichita	
Wyatt Earp	1994		
Truman	1995		
Mars Attacks!	1996	Partially set in fictional Perkinsville	
The Big Kahuna	1999		
Ninth Street	1999		
Ride with the Devil	1999		
Hedwig and the Angry Inch	2001		
Nurse Betty	2003		
Rolling Kansas	2003		
Mysterious Skin	2004		
Capote	2005	story of writing In Cold Blood	
Firecracker	2005		
The Muppets' Wizard of Oz	2005	television film	
The Ice Harvest	2005		
Infamous	2006		
The Lookout	2007		
New York City Serenade	2007		
Amelia	2009	biopic of Amelia Earhart	
Hannah's Law	2012	television film	
Looper	2012		
Oz the Great and Powerful	2013		
Man of Steel	2013	partially set in fictional Smallville	
Batman v Superman: Dawn of Justice	2016	partially set in fictional Smallville	
American Honey	2016		
Justice League	2017	partially set in fictional Smallville	
All Creatures Here Below	2018	partially set in De Soto	
Brightburn	2019	Set in fictional Brightburn	
Cold Storage	2026		
