= List of Kansas companies =

The following list of Kansas companies includes notable companies that are, or once were, headquartered in Kansas.

== Companies based in Kansas ==
=== A ===
- AMC Theatres
- Associated Wholesale Grocers

=== B ===
- Beechcraft
- Big Dog Motorcycles
- Black & Veatch

=== C ===
- Cargill Meat Solutions
- Cessna
- CivicPlus
- CoreFirst Bank & Trust
- CZ-USA

=== D ===
- Dillons

=== E ===
- Emprise Bank
- Evergy

=== F ===
- Ferrellgas
- Freddy's Frozen Custard & Steakburgers

=== G ===
- Garmin

=== H ===
- Hill's Pet Nutrition
- Houlihan's

=== K ===
- Koch, Inc.

=== L ===
- Learjet

=== M ===
- Morton Salt

=== N ===
- Netsmart Technologies

=== P ===
- Price Chopper

=== R ===
- RSI Corporation

=== S ===
- Seaboard Corporation
- SendThisFile
- Spangles
- Spirit AeroSystems
- Sprint Corporation

=== T ===
- Taco Tico

=== W ===
- Warren Theatres
- Watco

=== Y ===
- YRC Worldwide

== Companies formerly based in Kansas ==
=== A ===
- Ace Aircraft Manufacturing Company
- Aerial Distributors
- Affiliated Foods Midwest
- Air Midwest
- ALCO Stores
- Applebee's

=== C ===
- Coleman Company

=== D ===
- Dickinson Theatres

=== E ===
- Embarq

=== F ===
- Fuller Brush Company

=== H ===
- Hesston Corporation

=== I ===
- IFR Systems

=== L ===
- Lee
- LiveWatch Security
- Lone Star Steakhouse & Saloon

=== M ===
- Mentholatum

=== P ===
- Payless ShoeSource
- Pizza Hut
- Planet Sub

=== R ===
- Range Life Records

=== W ===
- White Castle
