= Office of the Kansas Securities Commissioner =

State regulatory body

Office of the Kansas Securities Commissioner is a division of the Kansas Insurance Department. The mission of the Office of the Kansas Securities Commissioner (KSC) is to protect and inform Kansas investors, to promote integrity and full disclosure by issuers and securities professionals, to investigate and prosecute fraud and to foster capital formation.

The Securities Commissioner administers the Kansas Uniform Securities Act, the Uniform Land Sales Practices Act, and the Loan Brokers Act. The Commissioner enforces these laws through administrative, civil and criminal proceedings.

== History ==
In 1911, Kansas became the first state to pass a law regulating the sale of investments. Lawmakers stated that the law was an attempt to prevent the sale of securities which had nothing behind them other than the "blue sky". In the next few years, over 30 states passed similar laws.

Following the great stock market crash of 1929, the federal government began to regulate investment activity with the passage of the Securities Act of 1933 and the creation of the U.S. Securities and Exchange Commission in 1934.

In 2011, the KSC and other state securities regulators celebrated the 100th Anniversary of the “Blue Sky” law.

== Leadership ==
The Office of the Kansas Securities Commissioner is administered by the Kansas Securities Commissioner.

=== Kansas Securities Commissioners ===
Name	Term
Claude Moore	1957–1958
Champ Graham	1959–1961
Richard Pringle	1961–1968
Donald Wurth	1968
Michael Quinn	1968–1971
Charles Rooney Jr.	1971–1974
W. Boyd Evans	1974
Robert C. Couch	1974–1977
Dwight Keen	1977–1982
John Wurth	1982–1987
M. Douglas Mays	1987–1991
James W. Parrish	1991–1995
John Wine Jr.	1995–1996
David Brant	1996–2003
Chris Biggs	2003–2010
Marc Wilson	2010–2011
D. Aaron Jack	2011–2013
Joshua Ney	2013–2017
John Wine Jr.	2017–2019
Jeff Wagaman	2019–2020
Daniel Klucas	2020–present

== Services offered ==
The agency regulates and monitors the securities offerings and financial services within Kansas. The staff registers securities, broker-dealers and their agents, investment advisers, loan brokers and certain land subdivisions. Agency staff investigates potential violations of the laws and ensure that registered persons and entities comply with industry, legal, and accounting standards.

To meet its mission, the KSC provides the following services:

“To protect and inform Kansas investors”

- Register securities, unless exempt
- Encourage investors to verify the licensing and registration status of salespeople and companies offering investment in Kansas
- Investigate potential violations of state securities laws and regulations
- Prosecute individuals who commit investment fraud
- Provide investor education resources to the public

“To promote integrity and full disclosure by issuers and securities professionals”

- Register broker-dealer personnel using the Central Registration Depository (CRD), a database that provides “one-stop” filing
- Register investment advisers or financial planners that manage less than $25 million in assets through the Investment Adviser Registration Depository (IARD), an electronic filing system
- Conduct record examinations of securities industry professionals to ensure their compliance with Kansas laws and regulations
- Offer continuing education opportunities to help registrants understand their regulatory obligations

“To investigate and prosecute fraud”

- Investigate investment activities originating both inside and outside of Kansas
- Work in conjunction with investigators from other states and draw upon resources of the National White Collar Crime Center (NWCCC)
- Prosecute theft and other felonies in conjunction with securities crimes

“To foster capital formation”

- Register small-company securities offerings via the Small Company Offering Registration (SCOR) process
