= USS Topeka =

USS Topeka, named after the state capital Topeka, Kansas, may be any one of these United States Navy ships:

- USS Topeka (PG-35), a gunboat bought in England 1898, originally built as Diogenes by Howaldtswerke in Kiel and in periodic use until 1929.
- USS Topeka (CL-67), a light cruiser of World War II, recommissioned in 1960 as the guided missile cruiser CLG-8, with service in the Vietnam War before decommissioning in 1969.
- USS Topeka (SSN-754), a Los Angeles-class nuclear attack submarine, commissioned in 1989 and still on active service.
