= Kansas University Rangers =

University basketball team

The Kansas University Rangers were a basketball team between 1922 and 1928.

They were loosely affiliated with the University of Kansas; a result of many players attending classes there. The team had no significant achievements but were featured in several posters promoting the University.
