= Plug-in electric vehicles in Kansas =

Electric vehicles in Kansas, US

As of May 2022, there were 3,130 electric vehicles registered in Kansas, equivalent to 0.12% of all vehicles in the state.

EV registrations in Kansas from 2016 to 2025

== Government policy ==
As of 2021, the state government charges a $100 registration fee for electric vehicles, compared to a standard fee of $30–40. This was raised to $165 dollars in 2026. At this rate, EV drivers pay approximately $123 more in tax every year than similar fossil-fuel powered car drivers.

Politicians who have led the effort to implement these fees have been found to have received significant funding from the oil and gas industry. In addition, organizations funded by the oil and gas industry, such as Koch Industries of Wichita, are actively pushing for fee increases.

== Charging stations ==
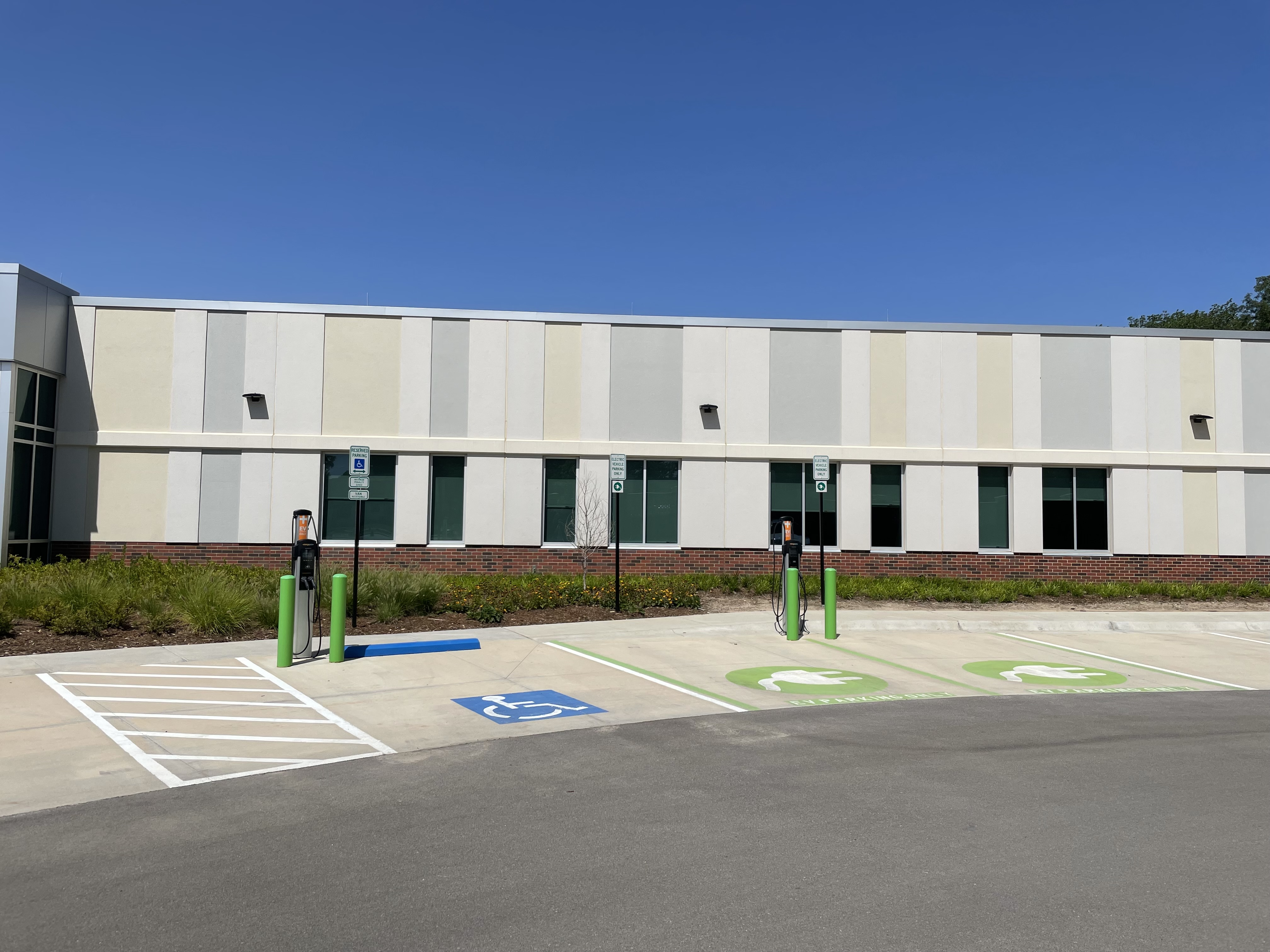
Electric vehicle charging station in Wichita

As of April 2022, there were 487 public charging station locations with 1,013 charging ports in Kansas.

The Infrastructure Investment and Jobs Act, signed into law in November 2021, allocates US$39.5 million to charging stations in Kansas.

As of February 2022, the state government recognizes I-35 and I-70 as potential charging corridors, with plans for charging stations to be located every 50 miles (80 km).

By September 2025, there were 69 DC fast charging stations with 15 being NEVI compliant. One NEVI funded station had been built, with 14 more under construction or planned. As of July 2026, there were a total of 585 EV charging stations across the state.

== By region ==
=== Kansas City ===
In July 2022, Panasonic announced plans to build a US$4 billion electric vehicle battery manufacturing plant in De Soto, which would be the largest in the state.

=== Lawrence ===
As of September 2022, there were 26 public charging stations in Lawrence. In 2025, Lawrence began to require parking lots with 50 or more spaces to provide EV chargers.

Lawrence Transit began procurement of battery electric buses in 2022. The entire fleet will be transitioned to zero-emission by 2035. Through May 2026, the electric bus fleet has saved 35,183 gallons of diesel and avoided 1,469 metric tons of carbon dioxide emissions.

=== Manhattan ===
As of September 2022, there were 19 public charging stations in Manhattan.

=== Wichita ===
Wichita introduced the first electric bus to its municipal fleet in January 2020, becoming the first local government in Kansas to do so.
