= Weskan, Kansas =

Unincorporated community in Wallace County, Kansas

- Unincorporated community and CDP
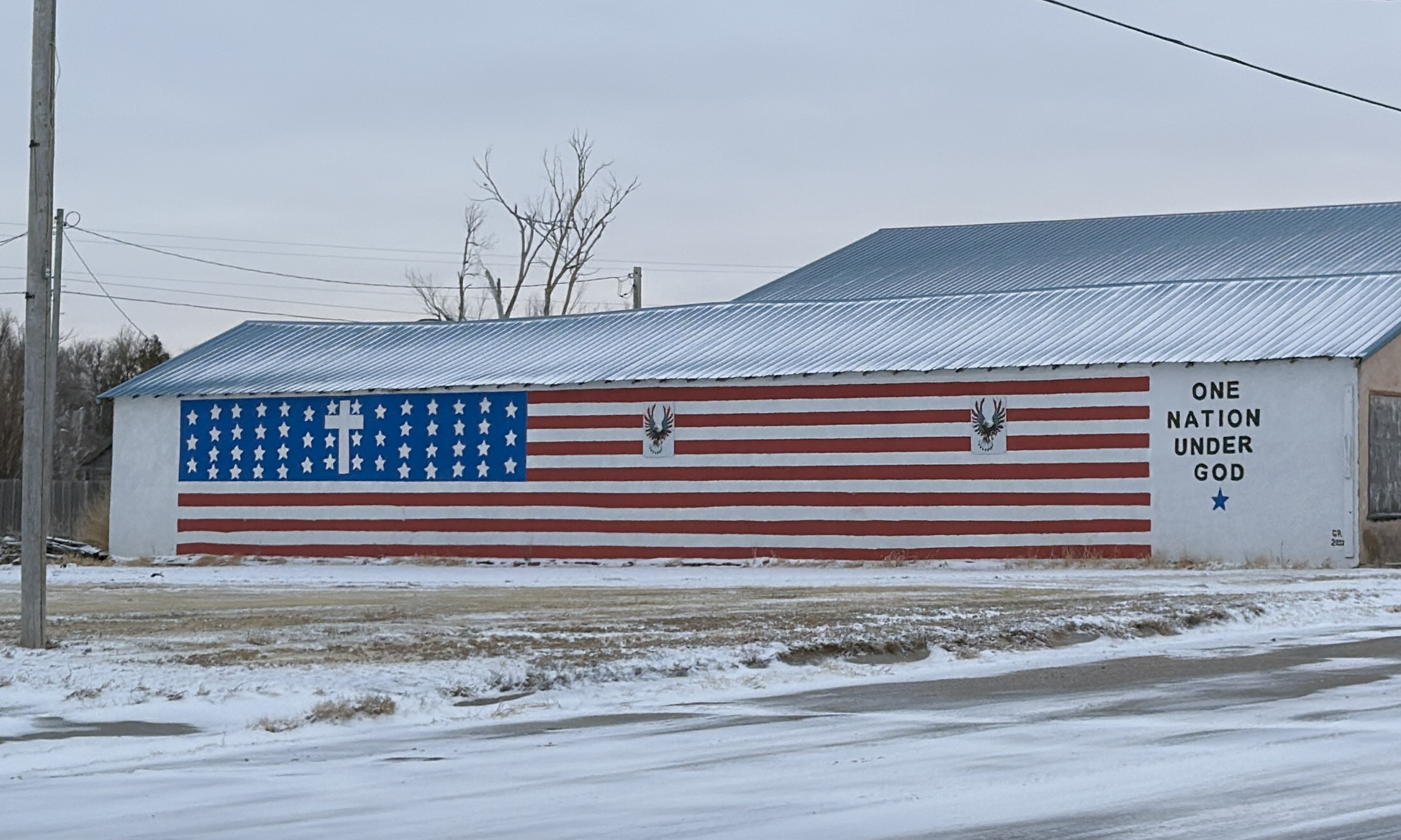
- Patriotic mural in Weskan (2025)

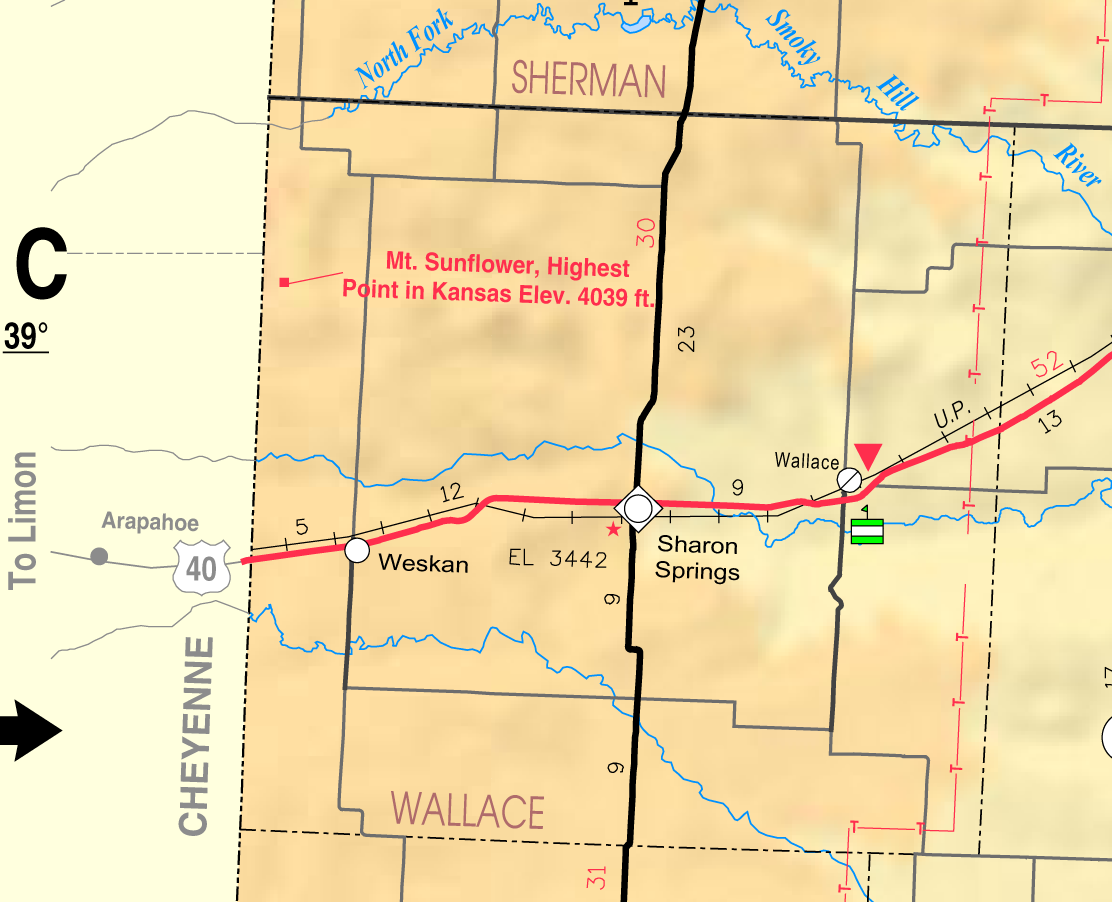
- KDOT map of Wallace County (legend)

- Location within Kansas Location within the United States
- Coordinates: 38°52′0″N 101°57′52″W
- Country: United States
- State: Kansas
- County: Wallace
- Elevation: 3,852 ft (1,174 m)

Population (2020)
  - Total: 158
- Time zone: UTC-7 (Mountain (MST))
  - Summer (DST): UTC-6 (MDT)
- ZIP Code: 67762
- Area code: 785
- FIPS code: 20-76675
- GNIS ID: 471161

Weskan is an unincorporated community and census-designated place (CDP) in Wallace County, Kansas, United States. As of the 2020 census, the population was 158. It is located along U.S. Route 40, 11.5 miles (18.5 km) west-southwest of Sharon Springs. It is the closest community to Mount Sunflower, the highest point in Kansas.

== History ==
The post office in Weskan was established in August 1887.

Weskan has a post office with ZIP Code 67762 and there is one high school located within the community.

A tornado struck Weskan on May 11, 2023, where it caused extensive damage at a school in the community.

== Demographics ==
Historical population
Census	Pop.	Note	%±
2020	158		—
U.S. Decennial Census

== Education ==
The community is served by Weskan USD 242 public school district. The Weskan mascot is Coyotes. Weskan was the first consolidated school in the state of Kansas.

Weskan High School was one of the first small schools in Kansas to participate in the Kansas 6 man football division in 2014, winning the state title in 2016 and 2018. The 6 man division was not officially sanctioned by the Kansas State High School Activities Association (KSHSAA) until 2022.
