= USS Kansas =

USS Kansas may refer to:

- USS Kansas (1863), a gunboat which saw action during the American Civil War
- USS Kansas (BB-21), a Connecticut-class battleship which sailed with the Great White Fleet

See also

- USS Kansas City
