= List of Kansas locations by per capita income =

Kansas has the 26th highest per capita income in the United States, at $20,506 (2000). Its personal per capita income is $29,935 (2003).

== Kansas counties ranked by per capita income ==
Note: Data is from the 2010 United States Census Data and the 2006-2010 American Community Survey 5-Year Estimates.

Rank	County	Per capita income	Median household income	Median family income	Population	Number of households
1	Johnson	$37,882	$73,733	$90,380	544,179	212,882
2	Scott	$28,872	$58,341	$65,000	4,936	1,983
3	Greeley	$28,698	$55,972	$63,967	1,247	525
4	Ness	$27,622	$47,639	$55,875	3,107	1,365
	United States	$27,334	$51,914	$62,982	308,745,538	116,716,292
5	McPherson	$26,467	$53,026	$68,016	29,180	11,748
6	Butler	$26,436	$56,290	$66,581	65,880	23,992
7	Miami	$26,218	$60,539	$70,243	32,787	12,161
8	Leavenworth	$25,925	$61,107	$73,491	76,227	26,447
	Kansas	$25,907	$49,424	$62,424	2,853,118	1,112,096
9	Shawnee	$25,705	$47,464	$61,250	177,934	72,600
10	Jefferson	$25,580	$56,886	$65,011	19,126	7,366
11	Sedgwick	$25,297	$47,848	$61,137	498,365	193,502
12	Lane	$25,261	$42,311	$57,768	1,750	799
13	Grant	$25,188	$55,514	$60,822	7,829	2,716
14	Pottawatomie	$25,157	$53,430	$66,591	21,604	7,878
15	Graham	$25,026	$43,980	$62,788	2,597	1,196
16	Sheridan	$24,933	$46,739	$52,854	2,556	1,099
17	Edwards	$24,899	$39,226	$50,128	3,037	1,302
18	Clay	$24,858	$42,490	$56,146	8,535	3,559
19	Douglas	$24,851	$45,831	$68,282	110,826	43,576
20	Republic	$24,731	$38,286	$50,028	4,980	2,274
21	Clark	$24,605	$37,931	$60,865	2,215	923
22	Ellis	$24,093	$44,543	$62,176	28,452	11,908
23	Woodson	$23,986	$30,385	$45,219	3,309	1,524
24	Morris	$23,967	$42,083	$54,167	5,923	2,554
25	Meade	$23,909	$46,658	$52,694	4,575	1,713
26	Thomas	$23,883	$47,033	$64,462	7,900	3,196
27	Coffey	$23,744	$47,171	$57,261	8,601	3,497
28	Barton	$23,688	$43,763	$51,780	27,674	11,283
29	Saline	$23,669	$45,162	$57,434	55,606	22,416
30	Smith	$23,644	$39,836	$47,699	3,853	1,748
31	Rush	$23,608	$39,435	$48,616	3,307	1,511
32	Pratt	$23,585	$43,583	$56,250	9,656	3,956
33	Barber	$23,542	$38,875	$48,836	4,861	2,139
34	Rooks	$23,435	$37,861	$47,628	5,181	2,238
35	Mitchell	$23,350	$44,247	$54,502	6,373	2,790
36	Jackson	$23,306	$51,759	$59,906	13,462	5,228
37	Wallace	$23,269	$43,953	$56,964	1,485	620
38	Russell	$23,243	$36,135	$45,720	6,970	3,173
39	Stafford	$23,171	$39,375	$51,414	4,437	1,907
40	Sumner	$23,114	$49,582	$62,429	24,132	9,454
41	Lincoln	$23,084	$41,071	$50,547	3,241	1,423
42	Wabaunsee	$23,072	$52,133	$61,823	7,053	2,737
43	Comanche	$22,974	$34,808	$50,938	1,891	824
44	Rawlins	$22,895	$39,797	$50,750	2,519	1,176
45	Harvey	$22,890	$46,604	$59,788	34,684	13,411
46	Morton	$22,862	$42,273	$55,145	3,233	1,250
47	Kingman	$22,861	$44,510	$55,152	7,858	3,227
48	Logan	$22,856	$39,375	$57,000	2,756	1,219
49	Gove	$22,775	$41,295	$47,561	2,695	1,154
50	Osage	$22,697	$48,594	$57,124	16,295	6,552
51	Ottawa	$22,665	$50,814	$59,750	6,091	2,456
52	Sherman	$22,651	$41,570	$49,135	6,010	2,608
53	Gray	$22,606	$52,824	$59,867	6,006	2,153
54	Osborne	$22,536	$34,797	$47,250	3,858	1,742
55	Nemaha	$22,484	$46,134	$57,083	10,178	4,115
56	Linn	$22,472	$44,379	$53,167	9,656	4,020
57	Harper	$22,467	$38,168	$46,335	6,034	2,545
58	Jewell	$22,443	$37,759	$47,431	3,077	1,450
59	Franklin	$22,294	$49,459	$58,941	25,992	10,104
60	Reno	$22,149	$41,431	$49,490	64,511	25,794
61	Trego	$22,095	$39,655	$51,250	3,001	1,358
62	Dickinson	$22,009	$46,457	$56,779	19,754	8,073
63	Decatur	$21,966	$35,383	$44,338	2,961	1,378
64	Haskell	$21,966	$45,859	$60,216	4,256	1,510
65	Chase	$21,890	$40,372	$54,554	2,790	1,150
66	Phillips	$21,870	$44,381	$54,193	5,642	2,432
67	Doniphan	$21,704	$43,410	$53,226	7,945	3,136
68	Ellsworth	$21,704	$42,200	$54,071	6,497	2,463
69	Stevens	$21,633	$50,517	$54,832	5,724	2,044
70	Chautauqua	$21,613	$35,848	$49,043	3,669	1,612
71	Greenwood	$21,325	$37,180	$49,336	6,689	2,988
72	Marshall	$21,295	$43,125	$56,261	10,117	4,300
73	Marion	$21,166	$45,713	$55,861	12,660	5,005
74	Montgomery	$21,037	$40,603	$51,264	35,471	14,382
75	Labette	$21,021	$39,049	$48,924	21,607	8,822
76	Atchison	$20,995	$44,175	$52,908	16,924	6,241
77	Finney	$20,976	$50,454	$56,747	36,776	12,359
78	Elk	$20,958	$33,455	$40,463	2,882	1,284
79	Kearny	$20,888	$46,435	$50,029	3,977	1,400
80	Hodgeman	$20,859	$41,127	$54,688	1,916	803
81	Cowley	$20,720	$40,749	$51,655	36,311	13,940
82	Geary	$20,709	$45,559	$50,195	34,362	12,690
83	Washington	$20,577	$39,698	$51,673	5,799	2,474
84	Anderson	$20,558	$40,428	$47,018	8,102	3,260
85	Wichita	$20,375	$44,318	$50,492	2,234	891
86	Allen	$20,195	$41,546	$51,855	13,371	5,475
87	Hamilton	$20,190	$36,297	$37,813	2,690	1,060
88	Cherokee	$20,075	$38,154	$48,319	21,603	8,625
89	Riley	$19,999	$39,257	$56,683	71,115	25,796
90	Crawford	$19,753	$35,286	$49,297	39,134	15,729
91	Brown	$19,555	$37,525	$46,646	9,984	4,094
92	Cheyenne	$19,460	$31,186	$47,386	2,726	1,260
93	Kiowa	$19,430	$37,292	$44,222	2,553	1,014
94	Ford	$19,348	$46,621	$52,211	33,848	11,145
95	Rice	$19,316	$43,164	$51,011	10,083	3,906
96	Stanton	$19,196	$49,612	$51,520	2,235	825
97	Norton	$19,080	$32,016	$56,773	5,671	2,163
98	Wyandotte	$18,827	$38,503	$47,653	157,505	58,399
99	Wilson	$18,708	$39,301	$48,207	9,409	3,933
100	Cloud	$18,690	$35,838	$44,679	9,533	3,910
101	Neosho	$18,683	$36,702	$48,652	16,512	6,645
102	Bourbon	$18,596	$38,045	$48,003	15,173	5,986
103	Lyon	$18,245	$36,921	$48,766	33,690	13,303
104	Seward	$18,083	$41,373	$46,434	22,952	7,460
105	Pawnee	$17,927	$40,048	$48,364	6,973	2,665

== See also ==
- Lists of places in Kansas
