= Kansas City Track Association =

The Kansas City Track Association (K.C.T.A) was formed to promote safe racing in the Midwest (United States). Clubs formed and participated in events that K.C.T.A sponsored. One of these groups was the "Hi-Winders" formed by John Graham, Tom Oldham and Jim Vandiver (and perhaps BIll Dahlsten) former students of Central Missouri State University. In a May 1, 1957 article in "The Student" from Warrensburg, Missouri they are quoted to have the mission "To promote a greater understanding between the general public and the hot rodder", they go on to state "We want people to understand that we're not a bunch of greasy hair levis-ed, combat boot boys".

The Hi-Winders had 28 members ranging in age from 18 to 29 and lived in the state of Missouri, most from Kansas City. Albert Bussert and Kenneth Marshall were described as sponsors.

Chairman of the KCTA Arnold H. Maremont, who is also CEO of Maremont Corporation, a manufacturer of mufflers says "... hot rodders are the safest drivers on the road today. They have to be or they'd be ruled out of every hot rod club and off every dragstrip in the country... The hot rodder and organized hot rod clubs have been hailed by traffic safety leaders, law enforcement officers and governmental officials as one of our strongest weapons in the fight against death on the highways."
