= Scouting in Kansas =

Scouting in Kansas has a long history, from the 1910s to the present day, serving thousands of youth in programs that suit the environment in which they live.

== Early history (1910−1950) ==
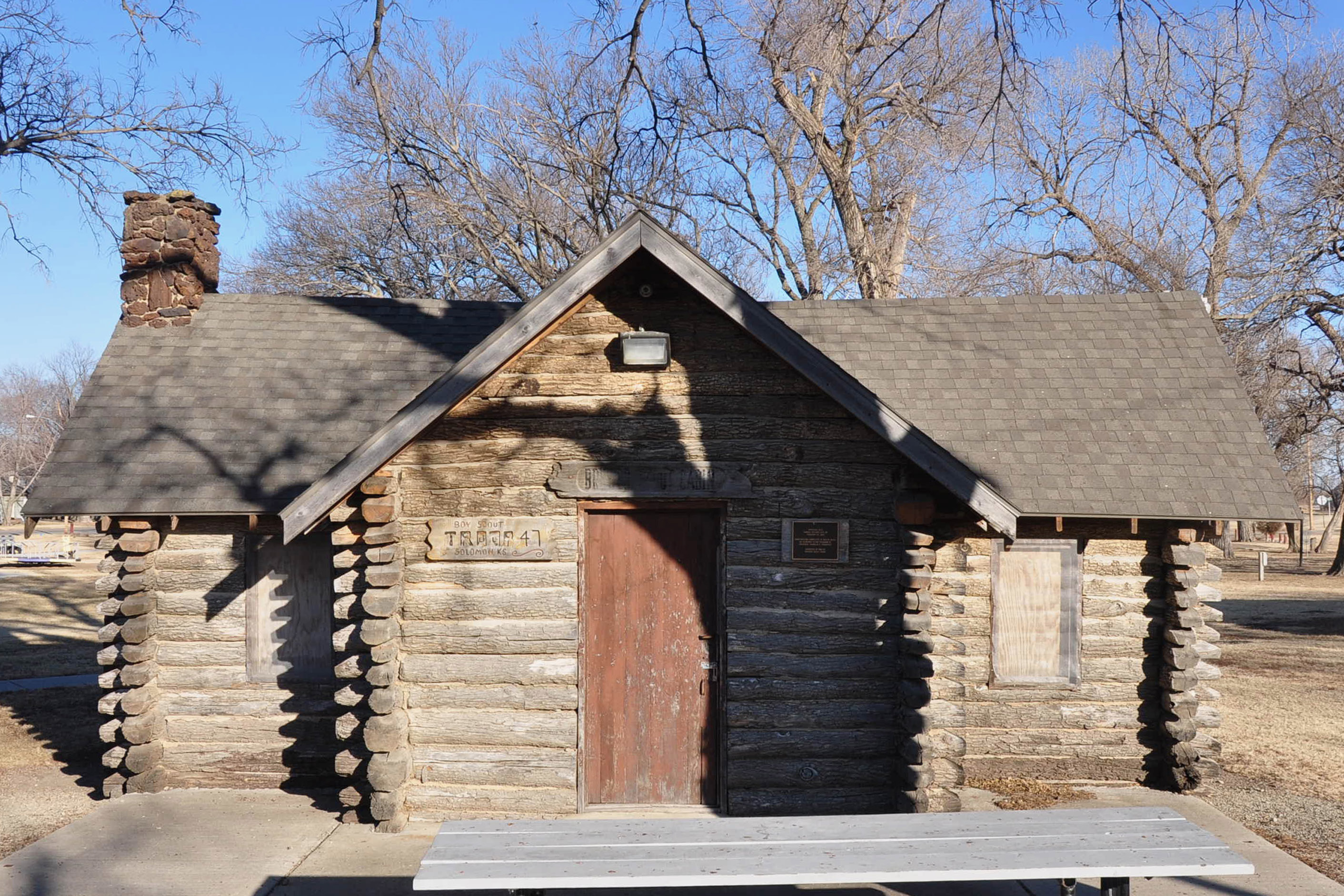
Brewer Scout Cabin in Solomon

The earliest record of Girl Scouting in the state of Kansas is in 1916 with the establishment of a Girl Scout program at Clay School in Topeka. In 1920, Topeka troops organized to acquire a charter from the national organization, and by 1923, the organization of Topeka, Kansas Council of Girl Scouts was completed.

Girl Scouting began in Kansas City, Kansas when Mrs. Fern Sears established the first troop in the area in 1942. By January of 1947, 10 troops were in the area and the process of council incorporation began. On June 12, 1947, the board of directors of the soon-to-be new council were elected. The first board was made up of Mrs. Fern Sears (President), Mrs. Hilda Curtis (Secretary), Mrs. Elma Sanders, Joseph H. Collins, Mrs. Wells Haren, Mrs. A. W. Stewart, Mrs. Joe Foster, Mr. Joe Foster, Frank Reising, and Rev. Olive Cook. On August 7, 1947, Jean Stouffer—representing the national organization—presented the board a charter to create the Kansas City, Kansas Council of Girl Scouts.

=== Brewer Scout Cabin ===
In the winter of 1933, local laborers working for the Civil Works Administration started to build a log cabin for Scouts in Solomon. The cabin was completed in the following Spring. That May, Kathryn Cramer started the first Girl Scout troop in Solomon with 22 girls. Cramer later married Lewis Seth Brewer, a Scoutmaster of Boy Scout Troop 47. Both Lewis and Kathryn Brewer were active members of the Scouting community in Solomon until their deaths in 1979 and 1983, respectively. In 1984, the Solomon Girl Scouts made a request to City Council that the CWA cabin be dedicated as the Brewer Scout Cabin, which they approved. In February of 2000, the Brewer Scout Cabin was approved as a Kansas Historic Site and in July, the cabin was listed on the National Register of Historic Places for its architectural significance.

== Recent history (1950−present) ==
In 1951, the Kansas City, Kansas Council of Girl Scouts expanded to include the entirety of Wyandotte County and was renamed the Santa Fe Trail Council. The council expanded four times between 1950 and 1994. In 1957, southwest Johnson County was added to its area, followed by Miami County in 1959; Anderson, Franklin, and Linn Counties in 1961; and Leavenworth County in 1966.

In 1954, the Kaw Valley Council of Girl Scouts was formed by combining the Topeka, Kansas Council with six surrounding counties. In 1967, Marshall and Washington Counties split from Lincoln, Nebraska-based Jayhusker Council to join the Kaw Valley Council.

In 1958 the National Order of the Arrow Conference was held at the University of Kansas.

In the 1990s and 2000s, BTK killer, also known as Dennis Rader, was a part of the Cub Scouts. He was a leader.

On October 1, 1994, Santa Fe Trail Council of Girl Scouts officially merged into Mid-Continent Council, creating an 18-county jurisdiction and reuniting Shawnee Mission with the rest of the Johnson County Girl Scout community.

Tipper Gore spoke at the 48th National Girl Scout Convention which was hosted at Municipal Auditorium in Kansas City, Missouri in October of 1999.

In the period of 2004–2007, Girl Scouts of the USA underwent a major realignment of council organization, going from 319 councils to 109. Starting officially on August 1, 2007, Kaw Valley Council, Mid-Continent Council, and Midland Empire Council combined to create Girl Scouts of NE Kansas & NW Missouri.

== Scouting America ==
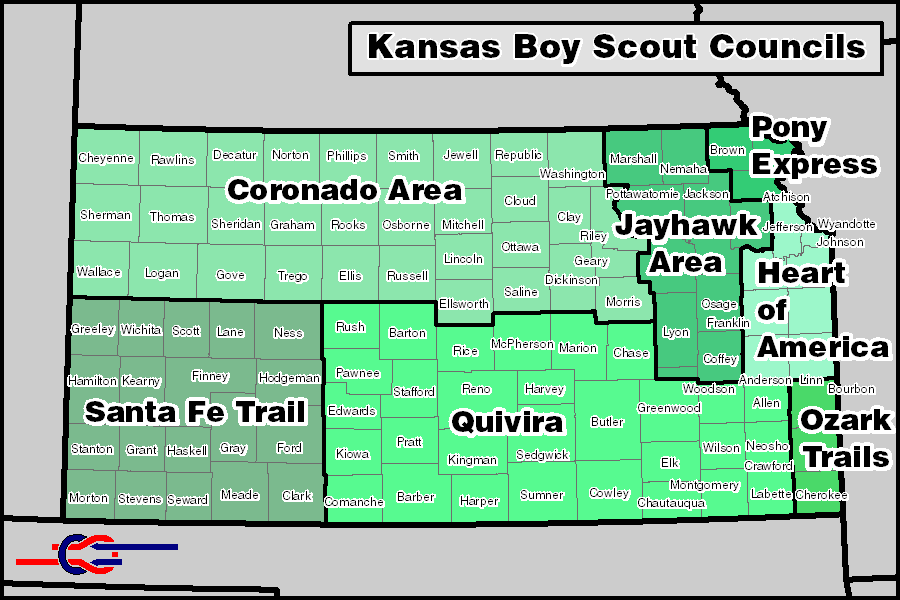
BSA Councils serving Kansas.

There are six Scouting America (formerly the Boy Scouts of America) local councils in Kansas

=== Coronado Area Council ===
Coronado Area Council serves north central and northwest Kansas, across 32 counties, with headquarters in Salina.

=== Heart of America Council ===
Heart of America Council serves Scouts in Missouri and Kansas.

=== Jayhawk Area Council ===
In 1928 the Topeka Council took over 39 counties across northern Kansas and became the Jayhawk Area Council.

- Bison District
- Pony Express District
- Sojadi District
- Sunflower District

==== Camps ====
The Jayhawk Area Council operates the 340 acres (140 ha) Falley Scout Reservation, which is divided into Camp Jayhawk (Scouts BSA Summer Camp) and Camp Delaware (Cub Scout Programs).

=== Ozark Trails Council ===
Ozark Trails Council serves Scouts in Missouri and Kansas.

=== Pony Express Council ===
The Pony Express Council is based in Saint Joseph, Missouri, and also serves Scouts in Kansas.

=== Quivira Council ===
Scouting America Quivira Council shoulder patch

Quivira Council serves youth in south central Kansas, with headquarters in Wichita. Kansa Lodge #198, Order of the Arrow serves local Arrowmen. They currently operate three camps: Camp Kanza (Cub Scouts and Webelos), which provides the name for their Lodge; Quivira Scout Ranch (Scouts BSA and Venturers), at which they host their largest summer camp program each summer, and offer Black Jack Trail, an introduction to backpacking, twice a year; and Camp Mandan which serves units in the western side of the Council.

- High Plains District
- Kanza District
- Osage Nation District
- Pawnee District
- South Winds District
- White Buffalo District
- Santa Fe Trail District

The Quivira Council website http://www.quivira.org/ has links to each district.

== Girl Scouts of the USA ==
Map of Girl Scout Councils and properties in Kansas

Following the 2007 realignment, there are three Girl Scout councils in Kansas.

=== Girl Scouts of Kansas Heartland ===
The Girl Scouts of Kansas Heartland serves more than 8,000 members in 80 counties in Kansas.

It was formed by the merger of six councils in 2008:

- Girl Scouts of Central Kansas,
- Girl Scout Council of the Flint Hills,
- Girl Scouts of Sunflower Council,
- Girl Scouts Wheatbelt Council,
- Girl Scouts of Tumbleweed Council, and
- Girl Scouts of the Golden Plains Council

Headquarters: Wichita

Satellite offices: Hays, Garden City, and Salina

Website: https://www.kansasgirlscouts.org/

==== Properties ====
- Camp Double E is 8.3 acres (3.4 ha) northwest of Emporia
- Starwoods Outdoor Center is 160 acres (65 ha) in Clearwater

==== Former Properties ====
- Camp Four Winds near Leon. It has a 13-acre (5.3 ha) lake.

=== Girl Scouts of the Missouri Heartland ===
Girl Scouts of the Missouri Heartland serves girls in 67 counties across central and southern Missouri, northeast Oklahoma, and southeastern Kansas. Its Kansas counties include Bourbon, Cherokee, and Crawford Counties.

Headquarters: Springfield, Missouri

Website: https://www.girlscoutsmoheartland.org/

==== Properties ====
- Friendship Fields Program Center is in Crawford County

=== Girl Scouts of Northeast Kansas and Northwest Missouri ===
Girl Scouts of Northeast Kansas and Northwest Missouri (GSKSMO) supports girls in 47 counties across Kansas and Missouri. Its Kansas counties include Atchison, Anderson, Brown, Clay, Doniphan, Douglas, Geary, Franklin, Jackson, Jefferson, Johnson, Leavenworth, Linn, Marshall, Miami, Nemaha, Pottawatomie, Riley, Shawnee, Wabaunsee, Washington and Wyandotte counties.

It was established on August 1, 2007, after a merger of three councils: Girl Scouts of Kaw Valley Council, Girl Scouts of Mid-Continent Council, and Girl Scouts of the Midland Empire.

Headquarters: Overland Park

Website: http://www.gsksmo.org

==== Camp Tongawood ====
Camp Tongawood is an 80 acres (32 ha) property located in Tonganoxie. Camp Tongawood was purchased in 1957. At time of purchase, the camp had two tent and Adirondack units. In 1961, a two-floor lodge was built at the front of the camp. Camp Tongawood also features a two-story environmental outpost, which was renovated to include a bunk room, counselor’s room, kitchen, and shower facilities following a donation to become a second indoor overnight unit.

Camp Tongawood has the facilities for a variety of adventure program activities. The range is located near the Chalet permanent unit in the northern portion of the camp and provides opportunities for archery, tomahawk & knife throwing, and slingshot shooting. North of the range is the Flying Squirrel site, a high ropes activity similar to a team belayed rope swing. A zip-line cuts through the center of camp. The environmental outpost sits on a small pond which facilitates canoeing and fishing.

Camp Tongawood is home to three meeting areas other than overnight units: Firelight Amphitheater, Mansfield Site, and Scouts' Own outdoor classroom. These sites require a short hike to access.

In 2018, the Camp Tongawood wetland trail received the Bankers Wildlife Award for Habitat Conservation from the Kansas Department of Wildlife and Parks.

==== Camp Prairie Schooner ====
Camp Prairie Schooner is a 176 acres (71 ha) property located in southeastern Kansas City, Missouri and sits on the Little Blue River. Camp Prairie Schooner was purchased by the Independence Council of Girl Scouts in 1945. In 2018, work started on a $2.3 million dollar renovation to build an aquatic center featuring a zero-entry pool, splash pad, and climbing rock, replacing the original 1962 pool. The project was completed in 2019.

Camp Prairie Schooner is home to a 40 feet (12 m) tower that facilitates climbing, rappelling, and crate stacking activities. Also at the camp is a zip-line and low ropes course. The range, located in the far north of camp, is set up for archery, tomahawk & knife throwing, slingshot shooting, and BB gun shooting.

The camp has four indoor overnight units, five permanent units, and two locations for tent camping. Neal Lodge, located at the front of camp, contains a commercial kitchen and capacity for 200.

==== Former Properties ====
- Camp Daisy Hindman, founded in 1929, is 160 acres (65 ha) in Dover, Kansas near Topeka. In 2008, Camp Daisy ceased its resident camp programs. It was closed in 2017 and sold in 2018 citing low attendance.
- Camp Cutteru is near Junction City, Kansas. It was purchased by Extreme Kansas Camp, a Christian youth organization.
- Camp Timberlake was 72 acres (29 ha) near Stilwell, Kansas, but was sold in 2009 due to terrain issues.
- Camp ToKaVaCa near Topeka, Kansas. It was closed in 2008 and sold in 2009 as part of a long-range property de-acquisition project following the 2007 merger.

== See also ==
- Roy Williams (Scouting)
- Tribe of Mic-O-Say
