= Mount Sunflower =

Highest point in Kansas, United States

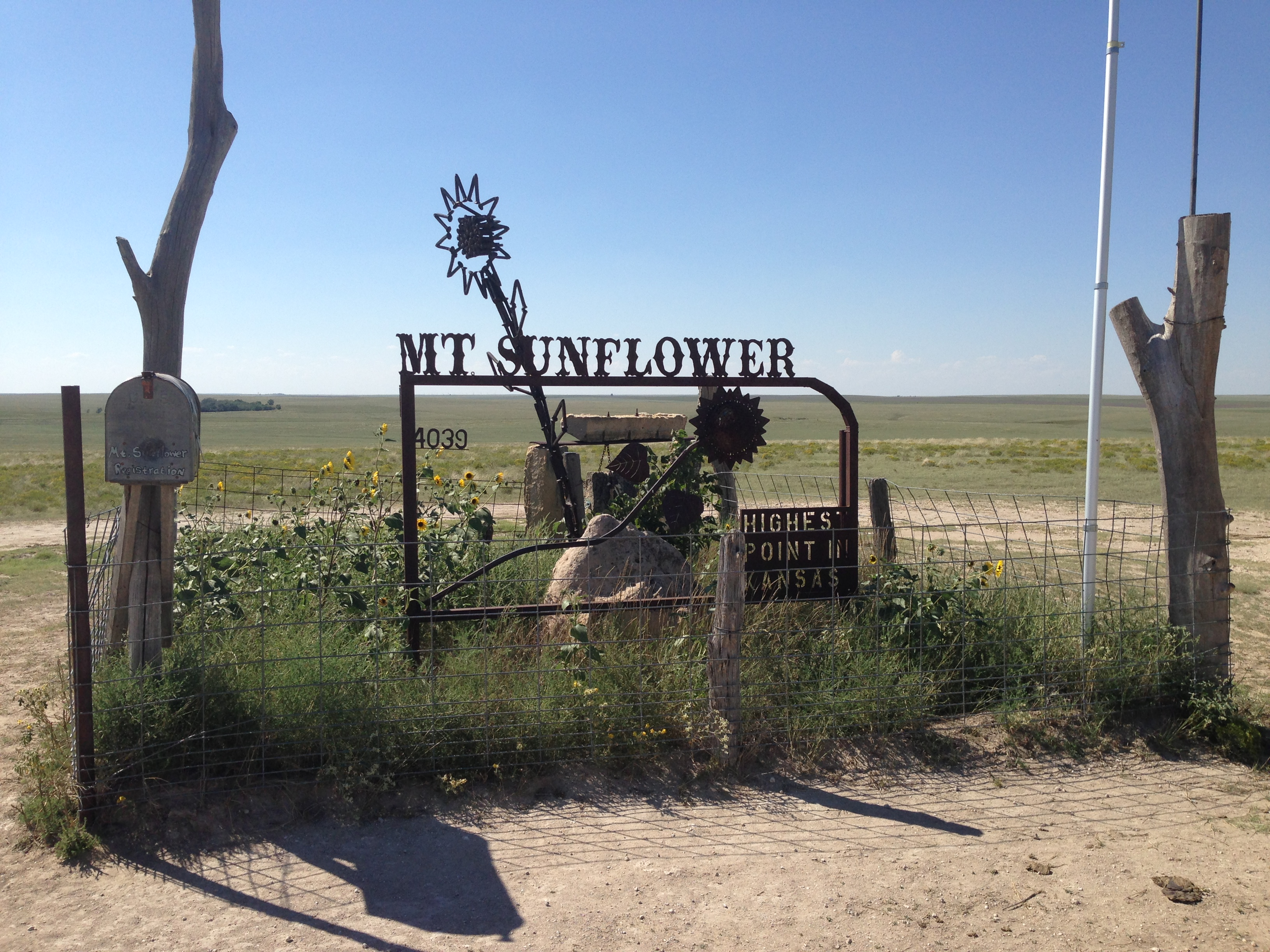
- The "summit" of Mount Sunflower

Highest point
- Elevation: 4,039 ft (1,231 m)
- Prominence: 19 ft (5.8 m)
- Listing: U.S. state high point 28th
- Coordinates: 39°01′19″N 102°02′14″W

Geography
- Location within Kansas
- Location: Southeast Quarter of Section 12, Township 12 South, Range 43 West of the Sixth Principal Meridian, Wallace County, Kansas, U.S.
- Topo map: USGS Mount Sunflower

Climbing
- Easiest route: Driving

Mount Sunflower, although not a true mountain, is the highest natural point in the U.S. state of Kansas. At 4,039 feet (1,231 m), it is 3,300 feet (1,010 m) above the state's topographic low point, which lies on the opposite side of the state. It is located between the communities of Kanorado and Weskan in Wallace County, less than half a mile (0.8 km) from the state border with Colorado and is near the lowest point in Colorado.

Mount Sunflower is located on private land owned by Ed and Cindy Harold, who encourage visitors to the site. Amenities include a picnic table, a little free library, a sunflower sculpture made from railroad spikes, and a plaque on the site stating, "On this site in 1897, nothing happened." Additionally, there is a mailbox on the site with a registration book inside where visitors can write their names, where they are from, and how many members are in their party.

Access is via county dirt roads to the edge of the property, then across a cattle guard and onto a private dirt road through a cattle grazing pasture to the summit. Mount Sunflower was designated as Kansas’s highest point by the United States Geological Survey in 1961. In the late 1970s Ed Harold decided to commemorate this site, homesteaded by his grandparents in 1906. The most famous attraction at the site is the sunflower sculpture made from railroad spikes that are welded together.

The state of Kansas gradually increases in elevation from the east to the west. As such, Mount Sunflower, while the highest natural point in the state in terms of elevation, is virtually indistinguishable from the surrounding terrain.

== See also ==
- Outline of Kansas
- Index of Kansas-related articles
- List of U.S. states by elevation
