= List of Kansas landmarks =

Below is a list of Kansas landmarks. This list includes various landmarks in the state of Kansas.

== Homes ==
- The boyhood home of Dwight D. Eisenhower, the Eisenhower Library, and his grave are located in Abilene.
- The house of Carrie Nation, now a museum and tourist attraction site, is located in Medicine Lodge.
- The boyhood home of General Frederick Funston [army soldier] is located in Iola.

== Museums ==
- The Evel Knievel Museum features a collection of Eval Knievals possessions, located in Topeka.
- The John Brown museum is located in Osawatomie.
- The Oz Museum, in Wamego, features a recreation of Dorothy's farm house from the 1939 musical film The Wizard of Oz.
- The Kansas Cosmosphere and Space Center, in Hutchinson, is a museum that features the largest collection of artifacts from the Russian Space Program outside of Moscow. It is also home to Apollo 13, an SR-71 Blackbird, and many space artifacts.
- The Kansas Museum of History, in Topeka, is the state museum.
- The Horace Greeley museum in Tribune.
- The Boyer Gallery, a collection of animated sculptures made by Paul Boyer is located in Belleville.
- The fifth largest collection of civilian and military aircraft in the United States is located at the Mid-America Air Museum in Liberal.
- The Sternberg Museum of Natural History in Hays, features exhibits of several fossils discovered by Charles Hazelius Sternberg as well as various temporary exhibits.

== Historical ==
- Abilene is the ending point of the Chisholm Trail where the cattle driven from Texas were loaded onto rail cars.
- Constitution Hall in Lecompton is the building where the Kansas Territorial Government convened and drafted the pro-slavery Lecompton Constitution of 1857.
- Constitution Hall in Topeka is the building where the Kansas Free State Government in the Kansas Territorial era convened and drafted the anti-slavery Topeka Constitution of 1855.
- The Sunflower Army Ammunition Plant in De Soto opened in 1942 to manufacture gunpowder and munitions propellants for World War II. The closed plant sits on over 9000 acres (36 km^{2}) of land which was made up of more than 100 farms.
- The Robert J. Dole Institute of Politics houses the largest collection of papers for a politician other than a president. The institute is located in Lawrence, on the campus of the University of Kansas.
- The Boot Hill Museum in Dodge City features Old West memorabilia and history.
- The Dalton Defenders Museum, located in Coffeyville, commemorates the townspeople who died defending the town against the Dalton Gang, who unsuccessfully attempted to rob two Coffeyville banks simultaneously on October 5, 1892.
- Concordia is home of the historic Brown Grand Theatre and Camp Concordia, a World War II Prisoner of war camp.
- The Debruce Center at the University of Kansas houses the original Rules of Basketball authored by James Naismith

== Halls of Fame ==
- The Greyhound Hall of Fame is located in Abilene.
- The National Teachers Hall of Fame is located in Emporia.
- The National Agricultural Center and Hall of Fame is located in Bonner Springs.

== Geological ==
- Big Basin Prairie Preserve contains Big Basin and Little Basin, two large sinkholes which are located in Clark County.
- Arikaree Breaks are badlands located in Cheyenne County, Kansas.
- The Cimarron National Grassland, Kansas's largest tract of public land, is located in Morton County.
- Monument Rocks is a series of chalk arcs and other formations. Kansas also has many other formations of this nature.
- The chalk formation Castle Rock (Kansas) and nearby badlands, near Quinter, Kansas.
- Rock City, Kansas

== Other ==
- The Biggest ball of twine, created August 15, 1953, in Cawker City.
- The Big Well, the world's largest hand dug well, is in Greensburg.
- Big Brutus, the largest electric strip mining shovel still in existence. On display in West Mineral, Kansas in the Mined Land Wildlife Area.
- A replica of Norman Number 1 (supposedly the first oil derrick west of the Mississippi River) and a small museum dedicated to it are located near the chamber of commerce building in Neodesha (located in the eastern end of the town, just before its Main Street merges with U.S. 75).
- Flint Hills Trail, a 91-mile hiking and biking trail that traverses the Flint Hills.

== See also ==
- List of Registered Historic Places in Kansas
- List of oldest buildings on Kansas colleges and universities
