= 2023 in Kansas =

- Decades: 2000s; 2010s; 2020s
- See also: History of Kansas; Historical outline of Kansas; List of years in Kansas; 2023 in the United States

The following is a list of events of the year 2023 in Kansas.

== Incumbents ==
=== State government ===
- Governor: Laura Kelly (D)

== Events ==
- November 7 – 2023 Wichita mayoral election
- September 19 – The Heartland Motorsports Park in Topeka closes.

== See also ==
- 2023 in the United States
