= 2026 in Kansas =

- Decades: 2000s; 2010s; 2020s
- See also: History of Kansas; Historical outline of Kansas; List of years in Kansas; 2026 in the United States

The following is a list of events of the year 2026 in Kansas.

== Incumbents ==
=== State government ===
- Governor: Laura Kelly (D)

== Events ==
=== February ===
- February 26 – The government of Kansas suspends the driver licenses of all transgender residents after the Kansas Legislature overrides a veto from Governor Laura Kelly. The suspension is announced only hours before midnight on the 25th.

=== March ===
- March 9 – The city council of Leavenworth votes 4–1 to allow CoreCivic to operate a closed prison used to house immigrants.

=== May ===
- May 13 – Former Coldwater Mayor Joe Ceballos is detained by Immigration and Customs Enforcement at the Wichita field office. Ceballos, originally from Mexico, had pleaded guilty to misdemeanor disorderly election conduct after he admitted he had previously voted, despite being a legal resident and not a citizen.

=== July ===
- July 12 – South Bow, owners of the Keystone Pipeline, agree to pay a $26.9 million civil penalty over a 2022 oil spill in Washington County.

=== August ===
- August 4 – 2026 Kansas Elections for Supreme Court Justices Amendment: Voters reject an amendment that would have made the Kansas Supreme Court an elected position.
- August 11 – A pair of Winfield parents kill their four children and themselves in their home.

=== September ===
- September 1 – The Department of Justice sues Kansas City, Kansas Public Schools over its policies regarding transgender students, including ones that allow these students to share their preferred name, gender, and pronouns with school staff.

=== October ===
- October 17 – A motorist in a truck drives through a field during a youth soccer game at the Stryker Sports Complex in Wichita and strikes 13 people, killing a six-year-old boy and a 35-year-old man. Prosecutors later decline to file charges against the woman, saying she had fallen asleep and accidentally hit the gas pedal.

=== November ===
- November 3 – 2026 Kansas elections:
  - 2026 Kansas Citizenship Voting Requirement Amendment
  - 2026 Kansas House of Representatives election
  - 2026 Kansas Attorney General election
  - 2026 Kansas gubernatorial election: Cindy Holscher beats Ty Masterson in the election.
  - 2026 Kansas Secretary of State election
  - 2026 United States House of Representatives elections in Kansas
  - 2026 United States Senate election in Kansas: Megachurch pastor Adam Hamilton defeats incumbent Roger Marshall. He is the first Democrat to be elected to the Senate from Kansas since 1932.

== Deaths ==
- August 21: Nancy Kassebaum Baker, 94, U.S. Senator (1978–1997)

== See also ==
- 2026 in the United States
