= 2025 in Kansas =

- Decades: 2000s; 2010s; 2020s
- See also: History of Kansas; Historical outline of Kansas; List of years in Kansas; 2025 in the United States

The following is a list of events of the year 2025 in Kansas.

== Incumbents ==
=== State government ===
- Governor: Laura Kelly (D)

== Events ==
Ongoing: 2024–2025 Kansas tuberculosis outbreak

- January 5 – Kansas is affected by the January 5–6, 2025 United States blizzard.
- March 13 – 2025 Southwest United States measles outbreak: The Kansas Department of Health and Environment confirms the state's first measles case of 2025.
- July 21 – A woman is killed by flash floods in Overland Park.
- October 14 – The Kansas Young Republicans organization is disbanded following a Politico report revealing that the chair and vice chair were in a group chat containing racist, antisemitic, and homophobic messages.
- November 4
  - 2025 Kansas City, Kansas mayoral election: Christal Watson wins election to become mayor of Kansas City.
  - 2025 Topeka mayoral election: City Councilmember Spencer Duncan wins election to become mayor of Topeka.
- November 10 – The Marion County government agrees to pay $3 million to the Marion County Record, a local newspaper whose offices were raided by sheriff's deputies in 2023.
- November 15 – Three Osage County Sheriff's deputies and a Kansas Highway Patrol trooper are injured in a shoot-out with a man at a rural property near Carbondale. The man's grandfather is also injured. The suspect is killed by police.
- December 22 – The Kansas City Chiefs announce they will leave Arrowhead Stadium in Kansas City, Missouri for a new stadium in the state of Kansas by 2031.

== See also ==
- 2025 in the United States
