= Vehicle registration plates of Kansas =

Kansas vehicle license plates

Kansas
Current series
- Slogan: To The Stars
- Size: 12 in × 6 in 30 cm × 15 cm
- Material: Aluminum
- Serial format: 1234ABC
- Introduced: August 19, 2024

Availability
- Issued by: Kansas Department of Revenue, Division of Vehicles

History
- First issued: July 1, 1913

The U.S. state of Kansas first required its residents to register their vehicles and display license plates in 1913. As of 2026, plates are issued by the Kansas Department of Revenue through its Division of Vehicles. Only rear plates have been required since 1956.

== Passenger baseplates ==
=== 1913 to 1975 ===
In 1956, the United States, Canada, and Mexico came to an agreement with the American Association of Motor Vehicle Administrators, the Automobile Manufacturers Association and the National Safety Council that standardized the size for license plates for vehicles (except those for motorcycles) at 6 inches (15 cm) in height by 12 inches (30 cm) in width, with standardized mounting holes. The 1955 (dated 1956) issue was the first Kansas license plate that complied with these standards.

Image	Dates issued	Description	Slogan	Serial format	Serials issued	Notes
	1913	Embossed black serial on white plate; diagonal "KAN" at right	none	12345	1 to approximately 39000	
	1914	Embossed white serial on dark blue plate; "KAN" at right	none	12345	1 to approximately 59000	
	1915	Embossed black serial on golden yellow plate with border line; diagonal "KAN" at right	none	12345	1 to approximately 86000	
	1916	Embossed white serial on black plate with border line; "KAN" monogram at right	none	123456	1 to approximately 140000	
	1917	Embossed black serial on light green plate with border line; vertical "KAN" at left	none	123456	1 to approximately 183000	
	1918	Embossed green serial on white plate with border line; vertical "KAN" at right	none	123456	1 to approximately 205000	
	1919	Embossed dark blue serial on light green plate with border line; vertical "KAN" at right	none	123456	1 to approximately 260000	
	1920	Embossed white serial on black plate with border line; vertical "KAN" at left	none	123456	1 to approximately 290000	
	1921	Embossed black serial on golden yellow plate with border line; "KAN 21" at right	none	123-456	1 to approximately 274-000	First dated plate.
	1922	Embossed golden yellow serial on black plate with border line; "KAN 22" at right	none	123-456	1 to approximately 304-000	
	1923	Embossed black serial on white plate with border line; vertical "KAN" and "1923" at left and right respectively	none	123456	1 to approximately 350000	
	1924	Embossed white serial on green plate with border line; vertical "KAN" and "24" at left	none	123-456	1 to approximately 369-000	
	1925	Embossed white serial on red plate with border line; "KAN 25" at right	none	123-456	1 to approximately 409-000	
	1926	Embossed white serial on dark blue plate with border line; "KAN 26" at left	none	123-456	1 to approximately 442-000	
	1927	Embossed black serial on gray plate with border line; vertical "1927" and "KAN" at left and right respectively	none	123-456	1 to approximately 459-000	
	1928	Embossed blue serial on white plate with border line; "KAN 28" at right	none	123-456	1 to approximately 472-000	
	1929	Embossed black serial on yellow plate; black lines at top and bottom borders; "KANSAS 1929" at bottom	none	123-456	1 to approximately 507-000	First use of the full state name.
	1930	Embossed white serial on black plate; white lines at top and bottom borders; "KANSAS - 1930" at top	none	1C12345; 10C1234; 100C123	Coded by county of issuance (1, 10 or 100)	First base to use numeric county codes.
	1931	Embossed white serial on green plate with border line; "KAN 31" at right	none	1-12345; 10-1234; 100-123	Coded by county of issuance (1, 10 or 100)	
	1932	Embossed black serial on orange plate with border line; "KAN 32" at left	none	1-12345; 10-1234; 100-123	Coded by county of issuance (1, 10 or 100)	
	1933	Embossed white serial on dark blue plate with border line; "KAN 33" at right	none	1-12345; 10-1234; 100-123	Coded by county of issuance (1, 10 or 100)	
	1934	Embossed black serial on white plate with border line; "KAN 34" at left	none	1-12345; 10-1234; 100-123	Coded by county of issuance (1, 10 or 100)	
	1935	Embossed orange serial on black plate with border line; "KAN 35" at right	none	1-12345; 10-1234; 100-123	Coded by county of issuance (1, 10 or 100)	
	1936	Embossed black serial on orange plate with border line; "KAN 36" at left	none	1-12345; 10-1234; 100-123	Coded by county of issuance (1, 10 or 100)	
	1937	Embossed yellow serial on black plate with border line; "KAN 37" at right	none	1-12345; 10-1234; 100-123	Coded by county of issuance (1, 10 or 100)	
	1938	Embossed white serial on black plate with border line; "KAN. '38" centered at bottom	none	1-12345; 10-1234; 100-123	Coded by county of issuance (1, 10 or 100)	
	1939	Embossed black serial on white plate with border line; "'39 KAN." centered at top	none	1-12345; 10-1234; 100-123	Coded by county of issuance (1, 10 or 100)	
	1940	Embossed white serial on black plate with border line; "KANSAS '40" centered at bottom	none	1-12345; 10-12345; 100-123	Coded by county of issuance (1, 10 or 100)	
	1941	Embossed yellow serial on dark red plate with border line; "41 KANSAS" centered at bottom	none	1-12345; 10-12345; 100-123	Coded by county of issuance (1, 10 or 100)	
	1942	Embossed white serial on green plate with border line; "KANSAS '42" centered at bottom; sunflower decals at bottom corners	none	1-12345; 10-12345; 100-123	Coded by county of issuance (1, 10 or 100)	
	1943	Embossed white serial on green plate with border line; "KANSAS '42" centered at bottom; sunflower decals at bottom corners	none	1-12345; 10-12345; 100-123	Coded by county of issuance (1, 10 or 100)	Revalidated for 1943 with zinc "43" tabs over the '42, due to metal conservation for World War II.
	1944	Embossed red serial on white plate with border line; "KANSAS-44" at top	none	1-12345; 10-12345; 100-123	Coded by county of issuance (1, 10 or 100)	
	1945	Embossed black serial on white plate; "KANSAS-45" centered at top	none	1-12345; 10-12345; 100-123	Coded by county of issuance (1, 10 or 100)	
	1946	Embossed blue serial on golden yellow plate; "KANSAS-46" centered at top	none	1-12345; 10-12345; 100-123	Coded by county of issuance (1, 10 or 100)	
	1947	Embossed black serial on white plate with border line; "19 KANSAS 47" at top	none	1-12345; 10-12345; 100-1234	Coded by county of issuance (1, 10 or 100)	
	1948	Embossed white serial on black plate with border line; "19 KANSAS 48" at top	none	1-12345; 10-12345; 100-1234	Coded by county of issuance (1, 10 or 100)	
	1949	Embossed black serial on unpainted aluminum plate with border line; "19 KANSAS 49" at top	"THE WHEAT STATE" at bottom	1-12345; 10-12345; 100-1234	Coded by county of issuance (1, 10 or 100)	
	1950	Embossed green serial on unpainted aluminum plate with border line; "KANSAS 50" centered at top	"THE WHEAT STATE" centered at bottom	1-12345; 10-12345; 100-1234	Coded by county of issuance (1, 10 or 100)	
	1951	Embossed white serial on dark blue state-shaped plate with border line; "KANSAS 51" centered at top	"THE WHEAT STATE" centered at bottom	A/B-12345	Coded by county of issuance (A/B)	First base to use two-letter county codes.
	1952	Embossed white serial on dark blue state-shaped plate with border line; "KANSAS 51" centered at top	"THE WHEAT STATE" centered at bottom	A/B-12345	Coded by county of issuance (A/B)	Revalidated for 1952 with white tabs, and for 1953 with yellow tabs, due to metal conservation for the Korean War.
	1953	Embossed white serial on dark blue state-shaped plate with border line; "KANSAS 51" centered at top	"THE WHEAT STATE" centered at bottom	A/B-12345	Coded by county of issuance (A/B)	Revalidated for 1952 with white tabs, and for 1953 with yellow tabs, due to metal conservation for the Korean War.
	1954	Embossed black serial on white state-shaped plate with border line; "KANSAS 54" centered at top	"THE WHEAT STATE" centered at bottom	A/B-12345	Coded by county of issuance (A/B)	
	1955	Embossed white serial on black state-shaped plate with border line; "KANSAS 55" centered at top	"THE WHEAT STATE" centered at bottom	A/B-12345	Coded by county of issuance (A/B)	
	1956	Embossed black serial on white plate with state-shaped border; "KANSAS 56" centered at top	"THE WHEAT STATE" centered at bottom	A/B-12345	Coded by county of issuance (A/B)	1956 was the first year that Kansas plates complied with the new standardized 6" x 12" measurements.
	1957	Embossed red serial on white plate with state-shaped border; "KANSAS 57" centered at top	"THE WHEAT STATE" at bottom, offset to right	A/B-12345	Coded by county of issuance (A/B)	
	1958	Embossed yellow serial on blue plate with state-shaped border; "KANSAS 58" centered at top	"THE WHEAT STATE" at bottom, offset to right	A/B-12345	Coded by county of issuance (A/B)	
	1959	Embossed blue serial on yellow plate with state-shaped border; "KANSAS 59" centered at top	"THE WHEAT STATE" at bottom, offset to right	A/B-12345	Coded by county of issuance (A/B)	
	1960	Embossed blue serial on white plate with state-shaped border; "KANSAS 60" centered at top	"CENTENNIAL 1961" at bottom, offset to right	A/B-12345	Coded by county of issuance (A/B)	Both this and the 1961 base commemorated Kansas' 100 years of statehood.
	1961	Embossed brown serial on white plate with state-shaped border; "KANSAS 61" centered at top	"CENTENNIAL 1961" at bottom, offset to right	A/B-12345	Coded by county of issuance (A/B)	
	1962	Embossed white serial on green plate with state-shaped border; "KANSAS 62" centered at top	none	A/B-12345	Coded by county of issuance (A/B)	
	1963	Embossed green serial on white plate with state-shaped border; "KANSAS 63" centered at top	none	A/B-12345	Coded by county of issuance (A/B)	
	1964	Embossed white serial on blue plate with state-shaped border; "KANSAS 64" centered at top	none	A/B-12345	Coded by county of issuance (A/B)	
	1965	Embossed white serial on red plate with state-shaped border; "KANSAS 65" centered at top	"MIDWAY USA" centered at bottom	A/B-12345	Coded by county of issuance (A/B)	
	1966	Embossed white serial on black plate with state-shaped border; "KANSAS 66" centered at top	"MIDWAY USA" centered at bottom	A/B-12345	Coded by county of issuance (A/B)	
	1967	Embossed white serial on Columbia blue plate with state-shaped border; "KANSAS 67" centered at top	"MIDWAY USA" centered at bottom	A/B-12345	Coded by county of issuance (A/B)	
	1968	Embossed yellow serial on black plate with state-shaped border; "KANSAS 68" centered at top	"MIDWAY USA" centered at bottom	A/B-12345	Coded by county of issuance (A/B)	
	1969	Embossed white serial on black plate with state-shaped border; "KANSAS 69" centered at top	"MIDWAY USA" centered at bottom	A/B-12345	Coded by county of issuance (A/B)	
	1970	Embossed white serial on pale green plate with state-shaped border; "KANSAS 70" centered at top	"MIDWAY USA" centered at bottom	A/B-12345	Coded by county of issuance (A/B)	
	1971	Embossed white serial on red plate with state-shaped border; "KANSAS" and month of expiration centered at top and bottom respectively	none	A/B 12345	Coded by county of issuance (A/B)	Staggered registration introduced, with the month of expiration determined by the initial letter of the registrant's surname. The A/B 12345 serial format was used only on plates expiring on July 31.
	1971	Embossed white serial on red plate with state-shaped border; "KANSAS" and month of expiration centered at top and bottom respectively	none	A/B C12345	Coded by county of issuance (A/B) and month of expiration (C)	These plates using A/B C12345 expired from July 31 through December 31, 1971.
	1972	Embossed white serial on black plate with state-shaped border; "KANSAS" and month of expiration centered at top and bottom respectively	none	A/B C12345	Coded by county of issuance (A/B) and month of expiration (C)	Plates expired from February 29 through December 31, 1972.
	1973	Embossed gold serial on green plate with state-shaped border; "KANSAS" and month of expiration centered at top and bottom respectively	none	A/B C12345	Coded by county of issuance (A/B) and month of expiration (C)	Plates expired from February 28 through December 31, 1973.
	1974	Embossed white serial on red plate with state-shaped border; "KANSAS" and month of expiration centered at top and bottom respectively	none	A/B C12345	Coded by county of issuance (A/B) and month of expiration (C)	Plates expired from February 28 through December 31, 1974. The first "KANSAS 74" plates expired on July 31, 1974, and the first "Wheat Centennial" plates on August 31, 1974. In 1974, Kansas hosted a "Wheat Centennial" celebration commemorating the first Turkey Red wheat planting, according to folklore.
	1974	As above, but with "KANSAS 74" at top, and without month of expiration	none	A/B C12345	Coded by county of issuance (A/B) and month of expiration (C)	Plates expired from February 28 through December 31, 1974. The first "KANSAS 74" plates expired on July 31, 1974, and the first "Wheat Centennial" plates on August 31, 1974. In 1974, Kansas hosted a "Wheat Centennial" celebration commemorating the first Turkey Red wheat planting, according to folklore.
	1974	As above, but with "KANSAS 74" at top, and without month of expiration	"WHEAT CENTENNIAL" centered at bottom	A/B C12345	Coded by county of issuance (A/B) and month of expiration (C)	Plates expired from February 28 through December 31, 1974. The first "KANSAS 74" plates expired on July 31, 1974, and the first "Wheat Centennial" plates on August 31, 1974. In 1974, Kansas hosted a "Wheat Centennial" celebration commemorating the first Turkey Red wheat planting, according to folklore.
	1975	Embossed white serial on green plate with state-shaped border; "KANSAS 75" centered at top	"WHEAT CENTENNIAL" centered at bottom	A/B C12345	Coded by county of issuance (A/B) and month of expiration (C)	Plates expired from February 28 through December 31, 1975. The first plates without the slogan expired on August 31, 1975.
	1975	Embossed white serial on green plate with state-shaped border; "KANSAS 75" centered at top	none	A/B C12345	Coded by county of issuance (A/B) and month of expiration (C)	Plates expired from February 28 through December 31, 1975. The first plates without the slogan expired on August 31, 1975.

=== 1976 to present ===
Image	Dates issued	Description	Slogan	Serial format	Serials issued	Notes	
	1976–1980	Embossed white serial on dark blue plate with embossed white state-shaped border and "KANSAS 76" at top	none	A/B C12345	Coded by county of issuance (A/B) and month of expiration (C)		
	1980 – December 1981	Embossed white serial on blue plate with yellow wheat stalk graphic screened at left and "KANSAS" in yellow at top	none	A/B C12345	Coded by county of issuance (A/B) and month of expiration (C)	Awarded "Plate of the Year" for best new license plate of 1980 by the Automobile License Plate Collectors Association, the first time Kansas was so honored. Discontinued due to legibility issues, but revalidated with stickers until 1988.	
	January 1982 – December 1987	Embossed blue serial on reflective white plate; gold sunflower and wheat stalk graphic screened at top left and "KANSAS" in blue at top	none	A/B C12345	Coded by county of issuance (A/B) and month of expiration (C)	Issued only to new registrants. Serials in each county, for each month, continued from where the 1980–81 plates left off.	
	January 1988 – 1990	Embossed dark blue serial on white plate; brown wheat stalk graphic screened in the center; pale yellow band screened across top containing stylized "KANSAS" in the center and three dark blue stripes on either side	none	ABC 123	AAA 000 to approximately DVD 999		
	1990 – December 1993	Embossed dark blue serial on white plate; brown wheat stalk graphic screened in the center; pale yellow band screened across top containing stylized "KANSAS" in the center and three dark blue stripes on either side	none	ABC 123	DVE 000 to approximately GRR 999	The county sticker was enlarged and the state name was made more legible.	
	January 1994 – January 2001	Embossed blue serial on light blue, white and light yellow gradient plate; yellow wheat stalk graphic screened in the center and "KANSAS" in blue at top	none	ABC 123	GRS 000 to approximately PAZ 999; SMA 000 to approximately SVC 499	Awarded "Plate of the Year" for best new license plate of 1994 by the Automobile License Plate Collectors Association, the second time Kansas was so honored.	
	January 2001 – April 2007	Embossed black serial on sky blue plate; State Capitol screened in the center surrounded by clouds; fading gold band screened at bottom with gold wheat stalks at left and "KANSAS" in black at top	none	ABC 123	PBA 000 to SLZ 999; TAA 000 to approximately XWB 016	Revalidated through December 31, 2023, with the last expiration being December 31, 2024**. A state-wide replacement of all standard embossed plates started on January 1, 2024. Owners of old embossed plates will be required to replace them with the newest design at their annual renewal.	
	April 2007 – August 14, 2018	Embossed dark blue serial on light blue plate; top half of state seal screened in white at bottom right and "KANSAS" in dark blue at top	none	123 ABC	000 AAA to approximately 850 LJW	Letters I, O, and Q are not used in serials from late 2012 onwards (FFQ being the last). Ixx, Oxx, and Qxx series were skipped in 2016, 2021, & 2022, respectively. Revalidated through December 31, 2023 with the last expiration being December 31, 2024**. A state-wide replacement of all standard embossed plates started on January 1, 2024. Owners of old embossed plates will be required to replace them with the newest design at their annual renewal.	
	August 15, 2018 – September 7, 2023	Same as above, but with screened black serial and pre-printed county code	none	123 ABC	895 LJW to approximately 999 SGW	Number 666 is no longer being used in serials from late 2018 onwards. Oxx and Qxx series were skipped in 2021 and 2022, respectively.	
		September 8, 2023 – August 18, 2024	Same as above, but with different serial format	none	1234ABC	0000ABB to approximately 2899AFJ	Kansas switched to a 7-character serial format starting on September 8, 2023.
	August 19, 2024 – present	Screened black serial on light blue, white, and gold gradient plate with dark gray state-shaped border; State Capitol in dark gray at bottom left and "KANSAS" in dark gray centered at top	"To the Stars" centered at bottom	1234ABC	2900AFJ to 5145AHY (as of December 27, 2024)	On November 22, 2023, Kansas Governor Laura Kelly announced a redesigned standard license plate that was slated to replace all standard embossed plates starting in March 2024. This replacement was introduced due to longstanding legibility concerns with older embossed plates – the oldest of which had been on the road since 2001. However, following a widely negative response to the initial proposed redesign and with many locals deeming it too closely resembling the colors of Missouri and New York, Governor Kelly announced a contest on December 11, 2023, between five new designs that Kansans would instead vote on to decide the future plate. On December 15, this plate was chosen as the winner, with over 140,000 votes.	

**Standard embossed plates that are registered to farm vehicles were not part of the original replacement plan. According to KDOR, they are scheduled to start replacement on January 1, 2025.

**In some cases, owners of standard embossed plates (non-farm related) have been given renewals for 2025, rather than having to replace their plates with the newest design. There has been no official explanation from KDOR as to why this is the case.

== Replacement plates ==
Most specialty Kansas license plates are available to be reissued with the same serial number at the owner's request if they become damaged or illegible over time. Since Kansas does not have a rolling replate system, this duty falls on the vehicle owner to make sure their plates are legible to law enforcement and other motorists at all times.

This process includes all Collegiate, Firefighter, EMS, Disabled, and most other specialty plates. However, they will not be reissued with an embossed serial or original designs, even if the plate holder has an older design, such as the first edition Agriculture plates. Instead, they will be issued with the most current design of the plate, and will be completely flat.

The only style of plates that are not eligible to be reissued with the same serial are the standard Ad Astra or Capitol bases. If the owner wishes to retain their standard serial number, they can request it on a personalized plate.

=== County coding ===
Kansas has a system of county codes used for identification of the home county of a state resident or company on license plates and state tax forms.

The codes are two letters based on the first letter of and another letter in the name of the county. There is no true convention for the selection of the letters; for example, Bourbon County is the only county that begins with "BO," yet its code is "BB." In most cases, but not all, as noted above, the only county that begins with two particular letters gets those letters. Exceptions are Decatur, Dickinson, Hodgeman, Leavenworth, Logan, McPherson (MC is used for Mitchell), Norton (NO is used for Neosho), Pawnee, and Pottawatomie.

The two-letter code began appearing on Kansas license plates in 1951. From 1930 to 1950, the code was a number based on the order a county ranked in terms of population based on the 1920 United States Census. From 1951 until 1988, the two letters were stamped on the license plate on the far left side, one letter on top of the other. Since then, the letters are on a sticker applied to the upper-left corner of the plate.

There is also a place on the address form of Kansas tax forms to place the county code.

County	Numeric code, 1930–50	Letter code, 1951–present
Allen	24	AL
Anderson	52	AN
Atchison	15	AT
Barber	67	BA
Barton	33	BT
Bourbon	17	BB
Brown	25	BR
Butler	9	BU
Chase	81	CS
Chautauqua	63	CQ
Cherokee	10	CK
Cheyenne	82	CN
Clark	91	CA
Clay	41	CY
Cloud	36	CD
Coffey	44	CF
Comanche	90	CM
Cowley	8	CL
Crawford	4	CR
Decatur	74	DC
Dickinson	18	DK
Doniphan	45	DP
Douglas	16	DG
Edwards	79	ED
Elk	68	EK
Ellis	38	EL
Ellsworth	64	EW
Finney	71	FI
Ford	35	FO
Franklin	21	FR
Geary	47	GE
Gove	88	GO
Graham	76	GH
Grant	103	GT
Gray	89	GY
Greeley	105	GL
Greenwood	32	GW
Hamilton	101	HM
Harper	51	HP
Harvey	28	HV
Haskell	100	HS
Hodgeman	93	HG
Jackson	42	JA
Jefferson	46	JF
Jewell	43	JW
Johnson	19	JO
Kearny	98	KE
Kingman	57	KM
Kiowa	85	KW
Labette	11	LB
Lane	97	LE
Leavenworth	7	LV
Lincoln	66	LC
Linn	49	LN
Logan	95	LG
Lyon	13	LY
Marion	23	MN
Marshall	20	MS
McPherson	26	MP
Meade	86	ME
Miami	31	MI
Mitchell	55	MC
Montgomery	5	MG
Morris	54	MR
Morton	94	MT
Nemaha	34	NM
Neosho	22	NO
Ness	75	NS
Norton	61	NT
Osage	29	OS
Osborne	56	OB
Ottawa	65	OT
Pawnee	69	PN
Phillips	58	PL
Pottawatomie	39	PT
Pratt	53	PR
Rawlins	77	RA
Reno	6	RN
Republic	40	RP
Rice	48	RC
Riley	30	RL
Rooks	70	RO
Rush	73	RH
Russell	60	RS
Saline	14	SA
Scott	96	SC
Sedgwick	2	SG
Seward	84	SW
Shawnee	3	SN
Sheridan	87	SD
Sherman	80	SH
Smith	50	SM
Stafford	59	SF
Stanton	104	ST
Stevens	92	SV
Sumner	12	SU
Thomas	78	TH
Trego	83	TR
Wabaunsee	62	WB
Wallace	99	WA
Washington	37	WS
Wichita	102	WH
Wilson	27	WL
Woodson	72	WO
Wyandotte	1	WY

== Decals ==
=== Yearly registration decals ===
- Regular Auto decals started issuance in 1976 for 1977 expirations of the redesigned 1976 standard license plate. Trucks and other non-highway vehicles using the green 1975 plates were issued 1976 decals upon expiration.
- The decal sizing was changed from square to rectangular in 1994/1995 to be able to fit a similarly sized month sticker above the registration decal.
- The sizing was again changed in some 2012/2013 and all 2014 registrations to a square "smart sticker" that now includes the month, plate number, and registration year on one decal. Smart stickers for 2012 registrations were only issued to new plates in OCT, NOV, & DEC, and 2013 smart sticker issuance began in mid-May. Since the expiration month is now printed directly on the registration, separate month stickers were phased out and newer plates removed the debossed sticker well that had previously been used for the decal.

^ Denotes a decal issued to non-auto, vanity or specialty plate holders.

* Denotes a redesigned standard plate with a natural expiration.

Year	1977	1978	1979	1980	1981*	1981^	1982
Image							
Year	1983	1984	1985	1986	1987	1988	1989*
Image							
Year	1989^	1990	1991	1992	1993	1994	1994^
Image							
Year	1995*	1995^	1996	1997	1998	1999	2000
Image							
Year	2001	2002*	2002^	2003	2004	2005	2006
Image							
Year	2007	2008	2009	2010	2011	2012	2012
Image							
Year	2013	2013	2014	2015	2016	2017	2018
Image							
Year	2019	2020	2021	2022	2023	2024	2025
Image							

== Optional plates ==
=== Personalized plates ===
Starting January 1, 2025, all Kansas distinctive plates are now eligible for personalization.

Image	Type	Dates issued	Design	Serial format	Serials issued	Notes
	Personalized passenger	1975 registration year	Embossed white serial on green plate with "KANSAS 75" at top and county abbreviation/truck weight code at bottom	various	various	Kansas first issued vanity plates in 1975 to trucks only
	Personalized passenger	1976 to 1979 registration years	Embossed white serial on blue plate with "KANSAS 76" at top and county abbreviation/month of expiration at bottom	various	various	1976 was the first year that vanity plates were issued to cars
	Personalized passenger	1980 to 1984 registration years	Embossed dark blue serial on gold reflective plate with "KANSAS" at top and county abbreviation/month of expiration at bottom	various	various	
	Personalized passenger	1985 to 1989 registration years	Embossed dark blue serial on beige background with dark blue band at top containing "KANSAS" in the center in beige	various	various	
	Personalized passenger	1990 to 1994 registration years	Embossed dark blue serial on beige background with orange fade at top and stalk of wheat in the center; "KANSAS" in dark blue at top	various	various	
	Personalized passenger	1995 to 1999 registration years	Embossed blue serial on white plate with sky blue fade at top and blue sunflower graphic at bottom; "KANSAS" in blue at top	various	various	
	Personalized passenger	2000 to 2004 registration years	Embossed black serial on white plate with gold fade and wild sunflowers at bottom; "KANSAS" in yellow and black at top	various	various	
	Personalized passenger	2005 to 2009 registration years	Embossed brown serial on tan plate with embossed brown state-shaped border, brown buffalo in the center, and "Home On The Range" in brown at bottom; "KANSAS" in brown at top	various	various	Awarded "Plate of the Year" for best new license plate of 2005 by the Automobile License Plate Collectors Association, the third time Kansas was so honored.
	Personalized passenger	2010 to 2014 registration years	Embossed brown serial on sunset graphic background plate with old-fashioned windmill at left, modern wind turbine at right, grass at bottom, state seal in the center, and "America's Heartland" in white at bottom; "KANSAS" in dark brown at top	various	various	
	Personalized passenger	2015 to 2018 registration years	Embossed black serial on sunflower graphic background plate with "KANSAS" and "SUNFLOWER STATE" in black at top and bottom, respectively	various	various	Kansas stopped taking orders for personalized plates in April 2018 to prepare for the launch of flat plates in August.
	Personalized passenger	2018 to 2019 registration years	Screened black serial on sunflower graphic background plate with "KANSAS" and "SUNFLOWER STATE" in black at top and bottom, respectively	various	various	Serial and county stickers became screened in August 2018.
	Personalized passenger	2020 to 2024 registration years	Screened white serial on gradient red and yellow background plate with three wind turbines at left; "KANSAS" and "Powering the Future" at top and bottom, respectively	various	various	The background of these plates tend to turn into a single shade of brown from any distance.
	Personalized passenger	2025 to 2029 registration years	Screened black serial on sunrise graphic overlooking the rolling green Flint Hills with "KANSAS" and "To the Stars" at top and bottom, respectively.	various	various	Kansas stopped taking personalized plate orders on October 11, 2024, to prepare for the new design starting January 1, 2025.
	Personalized passenger	January 1, 2022 – present	Same as 2018 state seal passenger base, with "PERSONALIZED" in black between the bolt holes at the bottom	various	various	Optional choice for personalized plates instead of the regular graphic design.

=== Educational institution plates ===
These plates share a common all-numeric serial format that started at 1 with K-State in 1997.

Image	Type	Dates issued	Design	Notes
	Baker University	2005–2009	Embossed black serial on white plate with the college's logo and "BAKER UNIVERSITY" at left; "KANSAS" in black at top	Discontinued due to minimum number of yearly registrations not met. Still valid for renewals
	Benedictine College	2016–2018	Embossed black serial on white plate with the college's logo at left; "KANSAS" and "BENEDICTINE COLLEGE" in red at top and bottom, respectively	
	Benedictine College	2018–present	Screened black serial on white plate with the college's logo at left; "KANSAS" and "BENEDICTINE COLLEGE" in red at top and bottom, respectively	
	Emporia State University	2001–2018	Embossed black serial on white plate with the university's mascot, Corky the Hornet, at left and "KANSAS" in black at top	
	Emporia State University	2018–present	Screened black serial on white plate with the university's "Power E" logo at left and "KANSAS" in black at top	
	Fort Hays State University	2003–2018	Embossed black serial on white plate with the university's tiger mascot at left and "KANSAS" in black at top	
	Fort Hays State University	2018–present	Screened black serial on white plate with the university's tiger mascot at left and "KANSAS" in black at top	
	Friends University	2016–2018	Embossed black serial on white plate with the university's logo at left and "KANSAS" in scarlet at top	
	Friends University	2018–present	Screened black serial on white plate with the university's logo at left and "KANSAS" in scarlet at top	
	Kansas State University	1997–2018	Embossed purple serial on white plate with the university's mascot, Willie the Wildcat, at left and "KANSAS" in purple at top	#1 issued in 1997 is still currently in active use
	Kansas State University	late 2018	Screened black serial on white plate with the university's mascot, Willie the Wildcat, at left and "KANSAS" in purple at top	These plates were issued between 40800 and 42000
	Kansas State University	2019–present	Screened black serial on white plate with the university's mascot, Willie the Wildcat, at left; "KANSAS" and "GO WILDCATS" in purple at top and bottom, respectively	
	Ottawa University	2005–2009	Embossed black serial on white plate with the university's logo and "OTTAWA UNIVERSITY" at left; "KANSAS" in black at top	Discontinued due to minimum number of yearly registrations not met. Still valid for renewals
	Pittsburg State University	2000–2018	Embossed crimson serial on white plate with the university's mascot, Gus the Gorilla, at left and "KANSAS" in crimson at top	
	Pittsburg State University	2018–present	Screened black serial on white plate with the university's mascot, Gus the Gorilla, at left and "KANSAS" in crimson at top	
	University of Kansas	1998–2018	Embossed blue serial on white plate with the university's mascot, Big Jay, at left and "KANSAS" in blue at top	
	University of Kansas	2018–present	Screened black serial on white plate with the university's mascot, Big Jay, at left; "KANSAS" and "ROCK CHALK" in blue at top and bottom, respectively	
	Washburn University	2005–2018	Embossed dark blue serial on white plate with the university's mascot, the Ichabod, at left and "KANSAS" in dark blue at top	
	Washburn University	2018–present	Screened black serial on white plate with the university's mascot, the Ichabod, at left and "KANSAS" in dark blue at top	
	Wichita State University	2000–2018	Embossed black serial on white plate with the university's mascot, WuShock, at left and "KANSAS" in black at top	
	Wichita State University	2018–present	Screened black serial on white plate with the university's mascot, WuShock, at left and "KANSAS" in black at top	

=== Organizational distinctive plates ===
Image	Type	Dates issued	Design	Serial format	Notes
	Agriculture	2005–2018	Embossed black serial on white plate with Kansas Foundation for Agriculture in the Classroom (KFAC) logo at the left and "KANSAS" in black at top	1234	
	Agriculture	late 2018	Screened black serial on white plate with Kansas Foundation for Agriculture in the Classroom (KFAC) logo at the left and "KANSAS" in black at top	1234	
	Agriculture	2019–present	Screened black serial on white plate with Kansas Foundation for Agriculture in the Classroom (KFAC) logo at the left; blue band containing "KANSAS" in white at top and "AGRICULTURE" in black at bottom	1234	
	Autism Awareness	2019–present	Screened black serial on white plate with Kansas Autism Awareness logo at the left and "KANSAS" in blue at top	1AB	
	Braden's Hope	2022–present	Screened black serial on white plate with red border and Braden's Hope for Childhood Cancer logo at left; "KANSAS" in blue and "Delivering HOPE" in red at top and bottom, respectively	1AB	
	Children's Trust Fund	2000–2018	Embossed blue serial on white plate with Kansas Children's Trust Fund logo at the left and "KANSAS" in blue at top	12345	
	Children's Trust Fund	2018–present	Screened black serial on white plate with Kansas Children's Trust Fund logo at the left and "KANSAS" in blue at top	12345	
	Choose Life	2022–present	Screened black serial on white plate with red and pink border and Kansas Choose Life logo at left; "KANSAS" in blue and "Choose LIFE" in pink at top and bottom, respectively	A123	
	City of Wichita	early 2019	Screened black serial on graphic of City of Wichita Flag plate with "KANSAS" in white at top	A123	A small number of plates with black serials were printed in error; owners were mailed correct plates with white serials
	City of Wichita	2019–present	Screened white serial on graphic of City of Wichita Flag plate with "KANSAS" in white at top	A123	
	Donate Life	2015–2018	Embossed black serial on green and white plate with Donate Life America logo at left; "KANSAS" and "Be an Organ, Eye and Tissue Donor" in black at top and bottom, respectively	123AB	
	Donate Life	2018–present	Screened black serial on green and white plate with Donate Life America logo at left; "KANSAS" and "Be an Organ, Eye and Tissue Donor" in black at top and bottom, respectively	123AB	
	Ducks Unlimited	2012–2018	Embossed black serial on white plate with graphic of duck head at left; "KANSAS" and "DUCKS UNLIMITED" in black at top and bottom, respectively	1ABC	
	Ducks Unlimited	2018–present	Screened black serial on white plate with graphic of duck head at left; "KANSAS" and "DUCKS UNLIMITED" in black at top and bottom, respectively	1ABC	
	Eisenhower Foundation	2014–2018	Embossed black serial on white plate with "I LIKE IKE" button graphic at left; and "KANSAS" in blue at top	AB12	
	Eisenhower Foundation	2018–present	Screened black serial on white plate with "I LIKE IKE" button graphic at left; and "KANSAS" in blue at top	AB12	
	Emergency Medical Services (EMS)	2008–2018	Embossed blue serial on white plate with embossed blue state-shape border and EMS Star of Life symbol at left; "KANSAS" and "EMS" in blue at top and bottom, respectively	12345	Must be employed in the EMS field
	Emergency Medical Services (EMS)	2018–present	Screened black serial on white plate with EMS Star of Life symbol at left; "KANSAS" and "EMS" in blue at top and bottom, respectively	12345	Must be employed in the EMS field
	Firefighter	2005–2018	Embossed red serial on gold plate with embossed red state-shape border and Firefighter Maltese Cross symbol at left; "KANSAS" and "FIREFIGHTER" in red at top and bottom, respectively	12345	Must be a firefighter – volunteer and retired are also eligible
	Firefighter	2018–present	Screened black serial on gold plate with red state-shape border and Firefighter Maltese Cross symbol at left; "KANSAS" and "FIREFIGHTER" in red at top and bottom, respectively	12345	Must be a firefighter – volunteer and retired are also eligible
	In God We Trust	2009–2018	Embossed dark blue serial on light blue plate with stalks of yellow wheat and "IN GOD WE TRUST" at left in white; "KANSAS" in white at top	AB123	
	In God We Trust	2018–present	Screened black serial on light blue plate with stalks of yellow wheat and "IN GOD WE TRUST" at left in white; "KANSAS" in white at top	AB123	
	Kansas 4H Foundation	2017–2018	Embossed green serial on white with 4H Clover Emblem at left, "KANSAS" and "TO MAKE THE BEST BETTER" slogan in white at top and bottom, respectively	AB1	
	Kansas 4H Foundation	2018–present	Screened black serial on white plate with 4H Clover Emblem at left, "KANSAS" and "TO MAKE THE BEST BETTER" slogan in white at top and bottom, respectively	AB1	
	Kansas Arts Foundation	2015–2018	Embossed dark blue serial on dark blue/black plate with Kansas Arts Foundation logo at left; "KANSAS" and "State of the Arts" in yellow at top and bottom, respectively	AB123	
	Kansas Arts Foundation	2018–present	Screened black serial on dark blue/black plate with Kansas Arts Foundation logo at left; "KANSAS" and "State of the Arts" in yellow at top and bottom, respectively	AB123	
	Kansas Breast Cancer Research	2008–2018	Embossed pink serial on white plate with Breast Cancer Awareness Ribbon and a sunflower at left; "KANSAS" in blue and "DRIVEN TO CURE" in white at top and bottom, respectively	12345	
	Kansas Breast Cancer Research	2018–present	Screened black serial on white plate with Breast Cancer Awareness Ribbon and a sunflower at left; "KANSAS" in pink and "DRIVEN TO CURE" in white at top and bottom, respectively	12345	
	Kansas Horse Council	2015–2018	Embossed black serial on sunset field background plate with horse graphic at left; "KANSAS" and "KANSAS HORSE COUNCIL" in black at top and bottom, respectively	ABCD1	
	Kansas Horse Council	2018–present	Screened black serial on sunset field background plate with horse graphic at left; "KANSAS" and "KANSAS HORSE COUNCIL" in black at top and bottom, respectively	ABCD1	
	Kansas Masonic Lodge	2015–2018	Embossed dark blue serial on gray plate with Kansas Freemason logo at the left; "KANSAS" and "KANSAS FREEMASONS - ON THE LEVEL" in blue at top and bottom, respectively	ABC1	
	Kansas Masonic Lodge	2018–present	Screened black serial on gray plate with Kansas Freemason logo at the left; "KANSAS" and "KANSAS FREEMASONS - ON THE LEVEL" in blue at top and bottom, respectively	ABC1	
	Kansas State Rifle Association	2022–present	Screened black serial on yellow plate with Gadsen Flag Don't Tread on Me logo at left; "KANSAS" and "Kansas State Rifle Association" in black at top and bottom, respectively	ABC12	
	K-State Veterinary Medicine	2013–2018	Embossed black serial on white plate with animal graphic at left; gold bars at top, "KANSAS" and "I'm Pet Friendly" in purple at top and bottom, respectively	AB123	
	K-State Veterinary Medicine	2018–present	Screened black serial on white plate with animal graphic at left; gold bars at top, "KANSAS" and "I'm Pet Friendly" in purple at top and bottom, respectively	AB123	
	Love, Chloe Foundation	2022–present	Screened black serial on blue plate with yellow ribbon and rainbow graphics; "KANSAS" and "FUELING THE FIGHT.ORG" in black at top and bottom, respectively	1AB	
	Shriners	2002–2018	Embossed red serial on white plate with Shriner's logo at right, graphic of man and child at left; "KANSAS" and "SHRINERS HELP KIDS" in red at top and bottom, respectively	12345	
	Shriners	2018–present	Screened black serial on white plate with Shriner's logo at right, graphic of man and child at left; "KANSAS" and "SHRINERS HELP KIDS" in red at top and bottom, respectively	12345	
	Special Olympics	2019–present	Screened black serial on white plate with Kansas Special Olympics logo at left; "KANSAS" and "KSSO.ORG" in red at top and bottom, respectively	A12	

=== Military distinctive plates ===
Image	Type	Dates issued	Design	Serial format	Notes
	Medal of Honor	2005–present	Embossed blue serial on white plate with national flag and medal graphic at left; "KANSAS" and "Medal of Honor" in blue at top and bottom, respectively	1	Must have been presented the Medal of Honor.
	Disabled Veteran	2001–2007	Same as 2001 state capitol passenger base, with disabled placard and "DISABLED VETERAN" in black at left and bottom, respectively	12345	Must have served in the armed forces of the United States and are entitled to compensation for either a service-connected disability, the loss of limbs, or permanent visual impairment.
	Disabled Veteran	2007–2018	Same as 2007 state seal passenger base, with disabled placard and "DISABLED VETERAN" in dark blue at left and bottom, respectively	12345	Must have served in the armed forces of the United States and are entitled to compensation for either a service-connected disability, the loss of limbs, or permanent visual impairment.
	Disabled Veteran	2018–2023	Same as 2018 state seal passenger base, with disabled placard and "DISABLED VETERAN" in black at left and bottom, respectively	12345	Must have served in the armed forces of the United States and are entitled to compensation for either a service-connected disability, the loss of limbs, or permanent visual impairment.
	Disabled Veteran	September 2023 – present	Same as above, but with different serial format	ABC123	Must have served in the armed forces of the United States and are entitled to compensation for either a service-connected disability, the loss of limbs, or permanent visual impairment.
	Ex-Prisoner of War	1980–present	Embossed blue serial on white plate with American Ex-Prisoners of War shield and motto in red at left; "KANSAS" and "EX-PRISONER OF WAR" in red at top and bottom, respectively	1234	Must have been held as a prisoner of war while serving in the military, including any civilian who was held as a prisoner of war.
	Families of the Fallen	2011–2018	Embossed blue serial on white plate with blue border; Gold Star and Next of Kin lapel button graphics at left; "KANSAS" and "FAMILIES OF THE FALLEN" in red at top and bottom, respectively	AB12	Must be a Department of Defense recognized next of kin of deceased military personnel.
	Families of the Fallen	2018–present	Screened black serial on white plate with blue border; Gold Star and Next of Kin lapel button graphics at left; "KANSAS" and "FAMILIES OF THE FALLEN" in red at top and bottom, respectively	AB12	Must be a Department of Defense recognized next of kin of deceased military personnel.
	Gold Star Mother	2009–2018	Embossed blue serial on white plate with Gold Star Mother graphic at left and gray state shape at right; "KANSAS" in gold on dark blue bar at top and "HONORING THOSE WHO HAVE FALLEN" on gold bar at bottom	12345	Must be the mother of a service member killed on active duty.
	Gold Star Mother	2018–present	Screened black serial on white plate with Gold Star Mother graphic at left and gray state shape at right; "KANSAS" in gold on dark blue bar at top and "HONORING THOSE WHO HAVE FALLEN" on gold bar at bottom	12345	Must be the mother of a service member killed on active duty.
	Korean War Veteran	2018–present	Screened black serial on white plate with Korean Service Medal graphic at left and "KANSAS" in blue at top	AB	Must have been a service member that showed honorable service on active duty between June 25, 1950, and January 31, 1955, during the Korean War, or awarded the Korean Service Medal.
	National Guard	1980–2018	Embossed blue serial on white plate with red minuteman graphic at left; "KANSAS" and "NATIONAL GUARD" in red at top and bottom, respectively	12345	Must be a member or retired member of the Kansas National Guard.
	National Guard	2018–present	Screened black serial on white plate with red minuteman graphic at left; "KANSAS" and "NATIONAL GUARD" in red at top and bottom, respectively	12345	Must be a member or retired member of the Kansas National Guard.
	Operation Desert Storm	2018–present	Screened black serial on white plate with Southwest Asia Service Medal graphic at left; "KANSAS" in blue at top	12A	Must have been awarded the Southwest Asia Service Medal.
	Operation Enduring Freedom	2018–present	Screened black serial on white plate with Afghanistan Campaign Medal graphic at left; "KANSAS" in blue at top	1AB	Must have been awarded the Afghanistan Campaign Medal .
	Operation Iraqi Freedom	2018–present	Screened black serial on white plate with Iraq Campaign Medal graphic at left; "KANSAS" in blue at top	AB1	Must have been awarded the Iraq Campaign Medal.
	Pearl Harbor Survivor	1993–present	Embossed red serial on white plate with logo of the Pearl Harbor Survivors Association at left; "KANSAS" and "Pearl Harbor Survivor" in red at top and bottom, respectively	1234	Must have been stationed during the attack at Pearl Harbor on December 7, 1941.
	Purple Heart	1995–2018	Embossed purple serial on white plate with Purple Heart graphic at left; "KANSAS" and "COMBAT WOUNDED" in purple at top and bottom, respectively	12345	Must have been awarded the Purple Heart Medal for being combat wounded.
	Purple Heart	2018–present	Screened black serial on white plate with Purple Heart graphic at left; "KANSAS" and "COMBAT WOUNDED" in purple at top and bottom, respectively	12345	Must have been awarded the Purple Heart Medal for being combat wounded.
	U.S. Veteran	1998–2007	Embossed blue serial on white plate with "U.S. VETERAN" and national coat of arms in blue at left, together with five red stars; "KANSAS" in blue at top	12345	Must be a currently serving member in the U.S. military or an honorably discharged veteran.
	U.S. Veteran	2007–2018	Embossed blue serial on white plate with "U.S. VETERAN" and national coat of arms in blue at left, together with five red stars; "KANSAS" in blue at top	12ABC	Must be a currently serving member in the U.S. military or an honorably discharged veteran.
	U.S. Veteran	2018–present	Screened black serial on white plate with "U.S. VETERAN" and national coat of arms in blue at left, together with five red stars; "KANSAS" in blue at top	12ABC	Must be a currently serving member in the U.S. military or an honorably discharged veteran.
	Vietnam Veteran	2011–2018	Embossed green serial on white plate with Vietnam Service Medal graphic at left; "KANSAS" and "VIETNAM VETERAN" in red at top and bottom, respectively	12345	Must have been awarded the Vietnam Service Medal.
	Vietnam Veteran	2018–present	Screened black serial on white plate with Vietnam Service Medal graphic at left; "KANSAS" and "VIETNAM VETERAN" in red at top and bottom, respectively	12345	Must have been awarded the Vietnam Service Medal.

=== Other distinctive plates ===
Image	Type	Dates issued	Design	Serial Format	Notes
	Amateur Radio Operator	2001–2007	Same as 2001 state capitol passenger base with call sign as the serial	various	The call sign is used as the plate serial and no county stickers are present.
	Amateur Radio Operator	2007–2018	Same as 2007 state seal passenger base with call sign as the serial	various	The call sign is used as the plate serial and no county stickers are present.
	Amateur Radio Operator	2018–present	Same as 2018 state seal passenger base with call sign as the serial	various	The call sign is used as the plate serial and no county stickers are present.
	Antique		Embossed gold serial on blue plate with embossed gold state-shaped border; "KANSAS" and "ANTIQUE" in gold at top and bottom, respectively	ABCDE; various	Random letters were issued in lieu of numbers. These plates are no longer issued, but still valid if displayed on the original vehicle it was registered to.
	Antique	1982–2001	Embossed navy blue serial on white plate with "KANSAS" and "ANTIQUE" in navy blue at top and bottom, respectively	123456; various	Can be issued to any vehicle 35 years or older. (1989 and older vehicles are eligible as of January 1, 2024) The owner can also choose to use an original Kansas license plate with correct year stickers instead (Speciality Antique).
	Antique	2001–2018	Embossed blue serial on white plate with "KANSAS" and "ANTIQUE" in blue at top and bottom, respectively	123456; various	Can be issued to any vehicle 35 years or older. (1989 and older vehicles are eligible as of January 1, 2024) The owner can also choose to use an original Kansas license plate with correct year stickers instead (Speciality Antique).
	Antique	2018–present	Screened black serial on white plate with "KANSAS" and "ANTIQUE" in blue at top and bottom, respectively	123456; various	Can be issued to any vehicle 35 years or older. (1989 and older vehicles are eligible as of January 1, 2024) The owner can also choose to use an original Kansas license plate with correct year stickers instead (Speciality Antique).
	Disabled	2001–2007	Same as 2001 state capitol passenger base with disabled placard at left	12345	Requires re-certification every 3 years to retain disabled status.
	Disabled	2007–2018	Same as 2007 state seal passenger base with disabled placard at left.	12345	Requires re-certification every 3 years to retain disabled status.
	Disabled	2018–2023	Same as 2018 state seal passenger base with disabled placard at left.	A1234	Requires re-certification every 3 years to retain disabled status.
	Disabled	September 2023 – present	Same as above, but with different serial format	ABC123	Requires re-certification every 3 years to retain disabled status.
	Special Interest	2018–present	Same as 2018 state seal passenger base with "SPEC" and "VEH" in black on left and right, respectively	12345	Issued to special vehicles that are at least 20 years old and have not been altered from original manufacturer specifications.
	Street Rod	2018–present	Same as state 2018 seal passenger base with "SPEC", "VEH", and "STREET ROD" in black at left, right, and bottom, respectively	12345	Issued to vehicles manufactured in 1949 or before that have been altered or modified and may be referred to as a "street rod.”

== Non-passenger plates ==
Apportioned		Embossed black serial on white plate with "KANSAS" and "APPORTIONED" in black at top and bottom, respectively	123456	Apportioned trucking vehicles accrue mileage among two or more jurisdictions and have a GVW that exceeds 26,000 pounds.
Commercial	2012–2018	Embossed purple serial on white plate with "PWR" at the left, "KANSAS" and "COMMERCIAL" in purple at top and bottom, respectively	123456	Most commonly used on semi-trucks or heavy machinery owned by a commercial company, but can also be used on trucks or SUVs owned by the same company. No annual registration stickers or county identification is needed.
Commercial	2018–present	Screened black serial on white plate with "PWR" at the left, "KANSAS" and "COMMERCIAL" in purple at top and bottom, respectively	123456	Most commonly used on semi-trucks or heavy machinery owned by a commercial company, but can also be used on trucks or SUVs owned by the same company. No annual registration stickers or county identification is needed.
Fleet	2001–2018	Embossed red serial on white plate with "KANSAS" and "FLEET" in red at top and bottom, respectively	F012345	Used for company fleet vehicles, most commonly seen on vehicles owned by utility companies.
Fleet	2018–present	Screened black serial on white plate with "KANSAS" and "FLEET" in red at top and bottom, respectively	F012345	Used for company fleet vehicles, most commonly seen on vehicles owned by utility companies.
Municipal	1989–1994	Embossed navy blue serial on white plate with "KANSAS" in navy blue at top	12345	Municipal plates use a county sticker in the top left along with the designation sticker at the bottom such as "CITY" or "COUNTY". They can be used for police cars, fire department SUVs, county vehicles, and school district vehicles. These plates are not transferable upon the sale or disposal of the vehicle.
Municipal	1994–2001	Embossed blue serial on white plate with "KANSAS" in blue at top	12345	Municipal plates use a county sticker in the top left along with the designation sticker at the bottom such as "CITY" or "COUNTY". They can be used for police cars, fire department SUVs, county vehicles, and school district vehicles. These plates are not transferable upon the sale or disposal of the vehicle.
Municipal	2001–2018	Embossed black serial on white plate with "KANSAS" in black at top	12345	Municipal plates use a county sticker in the top left along with the designation sticker at the bottom such as "CITY" or "COUNTY". They can be used for police cars, fire department SUVs, county vehicles, and school district vehicles. These plates are not transferable upon the sale or disposal of the vehicle.
Municipal	2018–present	Screened black serial on white plate with "KANSAS" in black at top	A1234	Municipal plates use a county sticker in the top left along with the designation sticker at the bottom such as "CITY" or "COUNTY". They can be used for police cars, fire department SUVs, county vehicles, and school district vehicles. These plates are not transferable upon the sale or disposal of the vehicle.
Permanent Trailer	1999–2018	Embossed red serial on white plate with "TRAILER" at left; "KANSAS" and "PERMANENT" in red at top and bottom, respectively	123456	Not transferable upon the sale or disposal of the trailer.
Permanent Trailer	2018–present	Flat black serial on white plate with "TRAILER" at left; "KANSAS" and "PERMANENT" in red at top and bottom, respectively	123456	Not transferable upon the sale or disposal of the trailer.
PWR Permanent Application	2001–2006	Embossed blue serial on white plate with "PWR" at left; "KANSAS" and "PERM APP" in red at top and bottom, respectively	123456	Used for commercial machinery such as semi-trucks, road construction equipment, dump trucks, etc. where a permanent application is needed
PWR Permanent Application	2006–2018	Embossed red serial on white plate with "PWR" at left; "KANSAS" and "PERM APP" in red at top and bottom, respectively	123456	
PWR Permanent Application	2018–present	Flat black serial on white plate with "PWR" at left; "KANSAS" and "PERM APP" in red at top and bottom, respectively	123456	Remakes of old numbers on flat plates are common because these plates tend to be damaged from the machinery they are used on
Rental Fleet	2020 – present	Flat black serial on standard passenger base, using a more condensed font. "PERMANENT" at top right.	R012345	All rentals seen with "SN" for Shawnee County.
State Trooper/ Kansas Highway Patrol	1983–1999	Embossed blue serial on white plate with Kansas Highway Patrol badge at left; "KANSAS" and "HIGHWAY PATROL" in blue at top and bottom, respectively	12345	Two plates are issued to State Trooper vehicles by the Kansas Highway Patrol for the front and rear. Each State Trooper is assigned a number and carries that same number through each plate design change.
State Trooper/ Kansas Highway Patrol	December 2016 – present	Embossed white serial on blue plate with Kansas Highway Patrol badge at left, "STATE TROOPER" and "Serving Kansas since 1937" in gold at top and bottom, respectively.	123	The Kansas Highway Patrol replated their entire fleet in late 2016 with these blue and gold plates in preparation for their 80th anniversary in 2017.

== Motorcycle plates ==
Image	Type	Dates issued	Design	Serial format	Serials issued	Notes
	Motorcycle	1975–1980	Embossed white serial on green plate with embossed white state-shaped border and "KANSAS 75" at top.	A/B-1234	Coded by county of issuance (A/B)	
	Motorcycle	1980–1981	Embossed white serial on blue plate with "KANSAS 75" and "CYCLE" at top and right, respectively.	A/B-1234	Coded by county of issuance (A/B)	Similar to the 1980 passenger base, these plates were discontinued due to legibility issues in late 1981
	Motorcycle	1982–1988	Embossed blue serial on reflective white plate with "KANSAS" and "CYCLE" at top and right, respectively.	A/B-1234	Coded by county of issuance (A/B)	Despite the debossed "80" in the lower left, these plates were not issued until 1982.
	Motorcycle	1982–1988	Embossed blue serial on reflective white plate with "KANSAS" and "CYCLE" at top and right, respectively.	A/B 1234	Coded by county of issuance (A/B)	The debossed "80" and hyphen did not appear on every plate, it depended on the county it was issued to.
	Motorcycle	1988–1994	Embossed dark blue serial on white plate with "KANSAS" and "CYCLE" at top and bottom, respectively	ABC12	AAA00 to approximately CNA99	
	Motorcycle	1994–2001	Embossed blue serial on white plate with "KANSAS" and "CYCLE" at top and bottom, respectively	ABC12	CWY00 to approximately EAR99; LBK00 to approximately MBP99	
	Motorcycle	2001–2007	Same as State Capitol passenger base with "CYCLE" screened at bottom	ABC12	OAA00 to approximately QPD99	
	Motorcycle	2007–2018	Same as 2007 state seal passenger base with "CYCLE" screened at bottom	12ABC	00AAA to 99DZZ	
	Motorcycle	2018–2023	Same as 2018 state seal passenger base with "CYCLE" screened at bottom	12ABC	00EAA to 99FZZ	Serial and county code became screened in August 2018.
	Motorcycle	2023–present	Same as above, but with different serial format	AB1CD	Starting at AA0AA (as of September 5, 2023)	
