= 2024 in Kansas =

- Decades: 2000s; 2010s; 2020s
- See also: History of Kansas; Historical outline of Kansas; List of years in Kansas; 2024 in the United States

The following is a list of events of the year 2024 in Kansas.

== Incumbents ==
=== State government ===
- Governor: Laura Kelly (D)

== Events ==
- March 19 –
  - The Democratic Party holds presidential nominating contests in Kansas.
  - The Republican Party holds presidential nominating contests in Kansas.
- May 6 – Tornado outbreak of May 6–10, 2024: The Storm Prediction Center issues a rare high risk convective outlook ahead of an expected significant tornado outbreak in parts of Oklahoma and Kansas.

== See also ==
- 2024 in the United States
