= Outline of Kansas =

U.S. State

The flag of Kansas

The seal of Kansas

The location of the state of Kansas in the United States of America

The following outline is provided as an overview of and topical guide to the U.S. state of Kansas:

Kansas – U.S. state located in the Midwestern United States. It is named after the Kansas River which flows through it, which in turn was named after the Kansa Native American tribe, which inhabited the area. The tribe's name (natively kką:ze) is often said to mean "people of the wind" or "people of the south wind," although this was probably not the term's original meaning.

== General reference ==
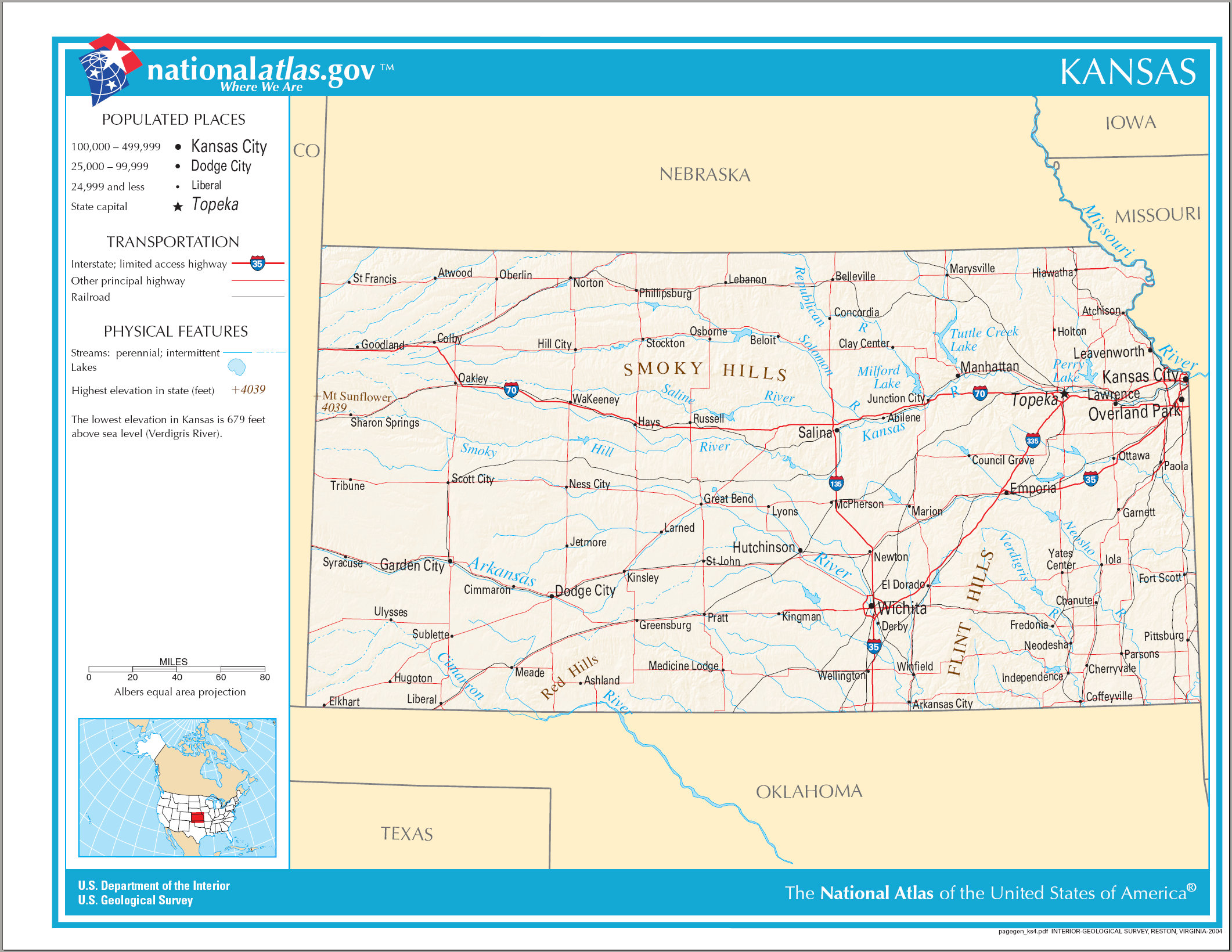
An enlargeable map of the state of Kansas

- Names
  - Common name: Kansas
    - Pronunciation: /ˈkænzəs/
- Official name: State of Kansas
  - Abbreviations and name codes
    - Postal symbol: KS
    - ISO 3166-2 code: US-KS
    - Internet second-level domain: .ks.us
  - Nicknames
    - America's Bread Basket
    - Sunflower State
    - Wheat State (previously used on license plates)
- Adjectival: Kansas
- Demonym: Kansan

== Geography of Kansas ==
Geography of Kansas

- Kansas is: a U.S. state, a federal state of the United States of America
- Location
  - Northern Hemisphere
  - Western Hemisphere
    - Americas
      - North America
        - Anglo America
        - Northern America
          - United States of America
            - Contiguous United States
              - Central United States
                - West North Central States
              - Midwestern United States
          - Great Plains
- Population of Kansas: 2,853,118 (2010 U.S. Census)
- Area of Kansas: 82,300 sq mi (213,100 km^{2})
- Atlas of Kansas

=== Places in Kansas ===
- Historic places in Kansas
  - Ghost towns in Kansas
  - National Historic Landmarks in Kansas
  - National Register of Historic Places listings in Kansas
    - Bridges on the National Register of Historic Places in Kansas
- National Natural Landmarks in Kansas
- National parks in Kansas
- State parks in Kansas

=== Environment of Kansas ===
- Climate of Kansas
- Geology of Kansas
- Superfund sites in Kansas
- Wildlife of Kansas
  - Fauna of Kansas
    - Ants of Kansas
    - Birds of Kansas
    - Reptiles
      - Snakes of Kansas

==== Natural geographic features of Kansas ====
- Rivers of Kansas
- Big Basin Prairie Preserve

=== Regions of Kansas ===
==== Administrative divisions of Kansas ====
- The 105 counties of the state of Kansas
  - Municipalities in Kansas
    - Cities in Kansas
      - State capital of Kansas:
      - City nicknames in Kansas

=== Demography of Kansas ===
Demographics of Kansas

== Government and politics of Kansas ==
- Form of government: U.S. state government
- Kansas's congressional delegations
- Kansas State Capitol
- Elections in Kansas
- Political party strength in Kansas

=== Branches of the government of Kansas ===
Government of Kansas

==== Executive branch of the government of Kansas ====
- Governor of Kansas
  - Lieutenant Governor of Kansas
  - Secretary of State of Kansas
  - Kansas State Treasurer
- State departments
  - Kansas Department of Transportation

==== Legislative branch of the government of Kansas ====
- Kansas Legislature (bicameral)
  - Upper house: Kansas Senate
  - Lower house: Kansas House of Representatives

==== Judicial branch of the government of Kansas ====
Courts of Kansas

- Supreme Court of Kansas

=== Law and order in Kansas ===
Law of Kansas

- Cannabis in Kansas
- Crime in Kansas
- Law enforcement in Kansas
  - Law enforcement agencies in Kansas

==== Laws by type ====
- Alcohol laws of Kansas
- Capital punishment in Kansas
  - Individuals executed in Kansas
- Constitution of Kansas
- Gun laws in Kansas

=== Military in Kansas ===
- Kansas Air National Guard
- Kansas Army National Guard

== History of Kansas ==
- History of Kansas

=== History of Kansas, by period ===
The location of the state of Kansas in the United States of America

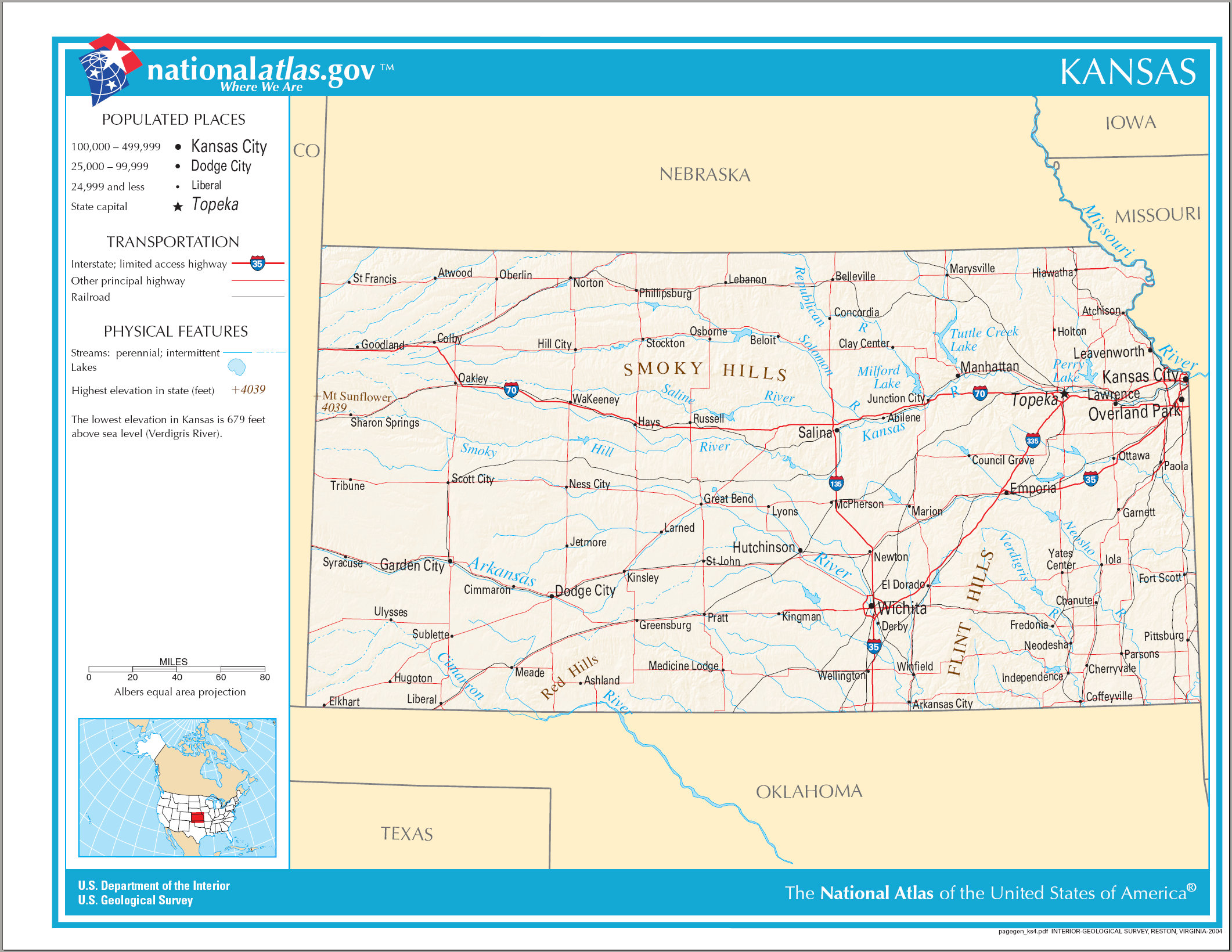
An enlargeable map of the state of Kansas

- Prehistory of Kansas
- French colony of Louisiane, 1699–1764
  - Treaty of Fontainebleau of 1762
- Spanish (though predominantly Francophone) district of Alta Luisiana, 1764–1803
  - Third Treaty of San Ildefonso of 1800
- French district of Haute-Louisiane, 1803
  - Louisiana Purchase of 1803
- Unorganized U.S. territory created by the Louisiana Purchase, 1803–1804
  - Lewis and Clark Expedition, 1804–1806
- District of Louisiana, 1804–1805
- Territory of Louisiana, 1805–1812
  - Pike Expedition, 1806–1807
- Territory of Missouri, 1812–1821
  - War of 1812, June 18, 1812 – March 23, 1815
    - Treaty of Ghent, December 24, 1814
  - Adams-Onís Treaty of 1819
- Unorganized Territory, 1821–1854
  - Santa Fe Trail, 1821–1880
  - Mexican–American War, April 25, 1846 – February 2, 1848
    - Treaty of Guadalupe Hidalgo, February 2, 1848
  - Treaty of Fort Laramie of 1851
- Territory of Kansas, 1854–1861
  - Kansas–Nebraska Act of 1854
  - History of slavery in Kansas
  - Bleeding Kansas, 1854–1859
  - Pike's Peak Gold Rush, 1858–1861
  - Territory of Jefferson (extralegal), 1859–1861
  - Pony Express, 1860–1861
- State of Kansas becomes 34th State admitted to the United States of America on January 29, 1861
  - American Civil War, April 12, 1861 – May 13, 1865
    - Kansas in the American Civil War
      - Price's Raid, September 27 – December 2, 1864
  - Comanche Campaign, 1868–1874
  - Spanish–American War, April 25 – August 12, 1898
  - Dwight D. Eisenhower becomes 34th President of the United States on January 20, 1953
  - United States Supreme Court hands down decision in Brown v. Board of Education of Topeka on May 17, 1954

=== History of Kansas, by region ===
- By city
  - History of Kansas City

=== History of Kansas, by subject ===
- History of education in Kansas
- History of slavery in Kansas
- History of sports in Kansas
  - History of the Kansas City Royals (a professional sports team located in Missouri but often affiliated with Kansas)
  - Timeline of college football in Kansas

== Culture of Kansas ==
Culture of Kansas

- Museums in Kansas
- Religion in Kansas
  - Episcopal Diocese of Kansas
- Scouting in Kansas
- State symbols of Kansas
  - Flag of the State of Kansas
  - Great Seal of the State of Kansas

=== The Arts in Kansas ===
- Music of Kansas

=== Sports in Kansas ===
Sports in Kansas

- College athletic programs in Kansas
- Kansas State High School Activities Association
- Kansas Sports Hall of Fame

== Economy and infrastructure of Kansas ==
Economy of Kansas

- Communications in Kansas
  - Newspapers in Kansas
  - Radio stations in Kansas
  - Television stations in Kansas
- Energy in Kansas
  - List of power stations in Kansas
  - Solar power in Kansas
  - Wind power in Kansas
- Health care in Kansas
  - Hospitals in Kansas
- Transportation in Kansas
  - Airports in Kansas

== Education in Kansas ==
Education in Kansas

- Schools in Kansas
  - School districts in Kansas
    - High schools in Kansas
  - Colleges and universities in Kansas
    - University of Kansas
    - Kansas State University

== See also ==
- Topic overview:
  - Kansas
  - Index of Kansas-related articles
