= List of National Natural Landmarks in Kansas =

There are five National Natural Landmarks in Kansas.

Kansas National Natural Landmarks (clickable map)

Name	Image	Date	Location	County	Ownership	Description
Haskell-Baker Wetlands		1969	38.916667°N 95.233333°W	Douglas	Private	An example of undisturbed wetland prairie.
Baldwin Woods		1980		Douglas	Private	A unique remnant oak-hickory stand.
Big Basin Prairie Preserve	Big Basin	1979	37.240278°N 99.9975°W	Clark	State	Excellent examples of collapse features formed by groundwater geological processes.
Monument Rocks	Monument Rocks	1968	38.790556°N 100.7625°W	Gove	Private	Pinnacles, small buttes, and spires of Niobrara formation chalk.
Rock City	Rock City	1976	39.090889°N 97.735553°W	Ottawa	Private	A unique cluster of about 200 great spherical sandstone concretions.

== See also ==
- List of National Historic Landmarks in Kansas
