= List of Kansas state symbols =

Location of the state of Kansas in the United States of America

The following is a list of symbols of the U.S. state of Kansas.

== State symbols ==
The flag of the state of Kansas

Type	Symbol	Year and references
Kansas state seal	Great Seal of the State of Kansas	1861
Kansas state flower and floral emblem	Wild native sunflower (Helianthus)	1903
Kansas state banner	Kansas state banner	1925
Kansas state flag	Flag of the State of Kansas	1927 (revised 1961, 1963)
Kansas state marches	"The Kansas March" and "Here's Kansas"	1935
Kansas state bird	Western meadowlark (Sturnella neglecta)	1937
Kansas state tree	Cottonwood (Populus deltoides)	1937
Kansas state song	"Home on the Range"	1947
Kansas state animal	American buffalo (Bison americanus)	1955
Kansas state insect	Honeybee	1976
Kansas state reptile	Ornate box turtle (Terrapene ornata)	1986
Kansas state soil	Harney silt loam	1990
Kansas state march	"Here's Kansas"	1992
Kansas state amphibian	Barred tiger salamander (Ambystoma mavortium)	1994
Kansas state grass	Little bluestem (Schizachyrium scoparium)	2010
Kansas marine fossil	Tylosaurus	2014
Kansas flying fossil	Pteranodon	2014
Kansas state rock	Greenhorn Limestone	2018
Kansas state mineral	Galena	2018
Kansas state gemstone	Jelinite	2018
Kansas state fish	Channel catfish (Ictalurus punctatus)	2018
Kansas state red wine grape	Chambourcin	2019
Kansas state white wine grape	Vignoles	2019
Kansas state fruit	Sandhill plum	2022
Kansas land fossil	Silvisaurus condrayi	2023

- Kansas state motto: Ad astra per aspera (Latin for To the stars through difficulties)
- Kansas state nickname: Sunflower State
- United States quarter dollar - buffalo (American bison) and sunflower

== See also ==
- List of Kansas-related topics
- Lists of United States state insignia
- State of Kansas
- Kansas Day
