= Baldwin Woods =

Natural area in Kansas, United States

Baldwin Woods Forest Preserve
- Interactive map of Baldwin Woods Forest Preserve
- Location: Douglas County, Kansas, United States
- Coordinates: 38.810°N 95.187°W
- Area: 404 acres (163 ha)
- Established: 1980
- Governing body: University of Kansas

Baldwin Woods, formally called the Baldwin Woods Forest Preserve, is a 456-acre (185 ha) nature reserve in Douglas County in the U.S. state of Kansas. The forest preserve is located near the municipality of Vinland within the Lawrence, Kansas metropolitan area. Formerly a 3,700-acre (1,500 ha) old-growth forest grove of white oak and hickory, with interspersed tallgrass prairie savanna, the old-growth portion of the forest preserve has been reduced to its present size. The park is managed by the KU Field Station, a division of the University of Kansas (KU). The forest preserve was named a National Natural Landmark in 1980.

The KU Field Station operates Baldwin Woods for the longitudinal study of the ecosystem dynamics of a woodland that is experiencing minimal human intervention onsite. The Woods is not managed for access; it is a scientific site with no public parking. Infrequent public tours, for which pre-registration is required, are sometimes offered. The KU Field Station acquired the Baldwin Woods tracts in a series of land transfers from 1965 through 2016.
