= Flag of Kansas =

U.S. state flag

Kansas
- Use: Civil and state flag
- Proportion: 3:5
- Adopted: September 24, 1961; 65 years ago
- Design: The state seal on a field of dark-blue, a sunflower is displayed above the seal, and the word "Kansas" in gold below
- Designed by: Hazel Avery
- Banner of Kansas
- Design: A blue field with a sunflower in the center
- Designed by: Joe Nickell
- Flag of the governor of Kansas
- Use: State flag
- Proportion: 3:5
- Design: The state flag but with white stars, one in each corner

The flag of Kansas represents the U.S. state of Kansas. Designed by Hazel Avery in 1925 and adopted in 1927 after Kansas Adjutant General Milton R. McLean pushed the legislation that adopted the flag, its design features the Kansas state seal and a sunflower (the state flower) on a blue field. In 1961, the original design was modified to include the state’s name at the bottom of the flag.

The flag of the Governor of Kansas closely resembles the state flag, differing only by the addition of four stars, one in each corner.

On June 30, 1953, Kansas also adopted a state banner, featuring a single sunflower on a blue field. Designed by Adjutant General Joe Nickell, the banner serves as an official alternative to the state flag. A copy is often kept in the governor’s office, and it is used by the Kansas National Guard.

== Official description ==
The design, form, and materials of the flag are regulated by state law, specifically Kansas Statute 73-702, which defines the official flag as follows:

The official state flag shall be a rectangle of dark-blue silk or bunting, 3 feet on the staff by 5 feet fly. The great seal of the state of Kansas, without its surrounding band of lettering, shall be located in the center of the flag. The seal shall be 17 inches in diameter. Above the seal shall be a sunflower on a bar of twisted gold and blue. The sunflower shall be 6 inches in diameter, and the bar shall be 9 inches in length. The top of the sunflower shall be located 2 inches beneath the top side of the flag. The letters KANSAS shall be imprinted in gold block letters below the seal, be 5 inches in height, and be imprinted with a stroke 1 inch wide. The first letter K shall commence with the same distance from the staff side of the flag as the end of the last letter S is from the fly side of the flag. The bottom edge of the letters shall be 2 inches above the base side of the flag.

In the concluding sentence it is noted that: "Larger or smaller flags will be of the same proportional dimensions."

The official banner of Kansas is defined by law as:

The official banner shall be of solid blue and shall be of the same tint as the color of the field of the United States flag, whose width shall be three-fourths of its length, with a sunflower in the center having a diameter of two-thirds of the space of the banner, enclosing and surrounding with its petals of gold, a brown center having a diameter of two-fifths the size of the sunflower.

=== Design of the seal ===
The state seal centered on the flag contains:

- Rising sun (right-hand corner)
- River and steamboat (left of the sun)
- Settler's cabin and a man plowing with a pair of horses (foreground)
- Train of ox-wagons going west (beyond)
- Herd of buffalo retreating, pursued by two Indians on horseback (background)
- State motto "Ad astra per aspera" (around the top)
- Cluster of 34 stars (beneath the motto)

=== Symbolism ===
For the seal, the law provides that the symbolism of certain elements is as follows: east is represented by the rising sun, commerce is represented by the river and steamboat, and agriculture, as the basis of the state's future prosperity, is represented by the settler's cabin and the man plowing with a pair of horses. Explanations for the other elements are not provided.

The thirty-four stars clustered at the top of the seal identify Kansas as the 34th state to be accepted into the Union of the United States. Kansas state law provides that the flag is to be used on all occasions when the state is officially represented.

Flag of Kansas (1927–1961)

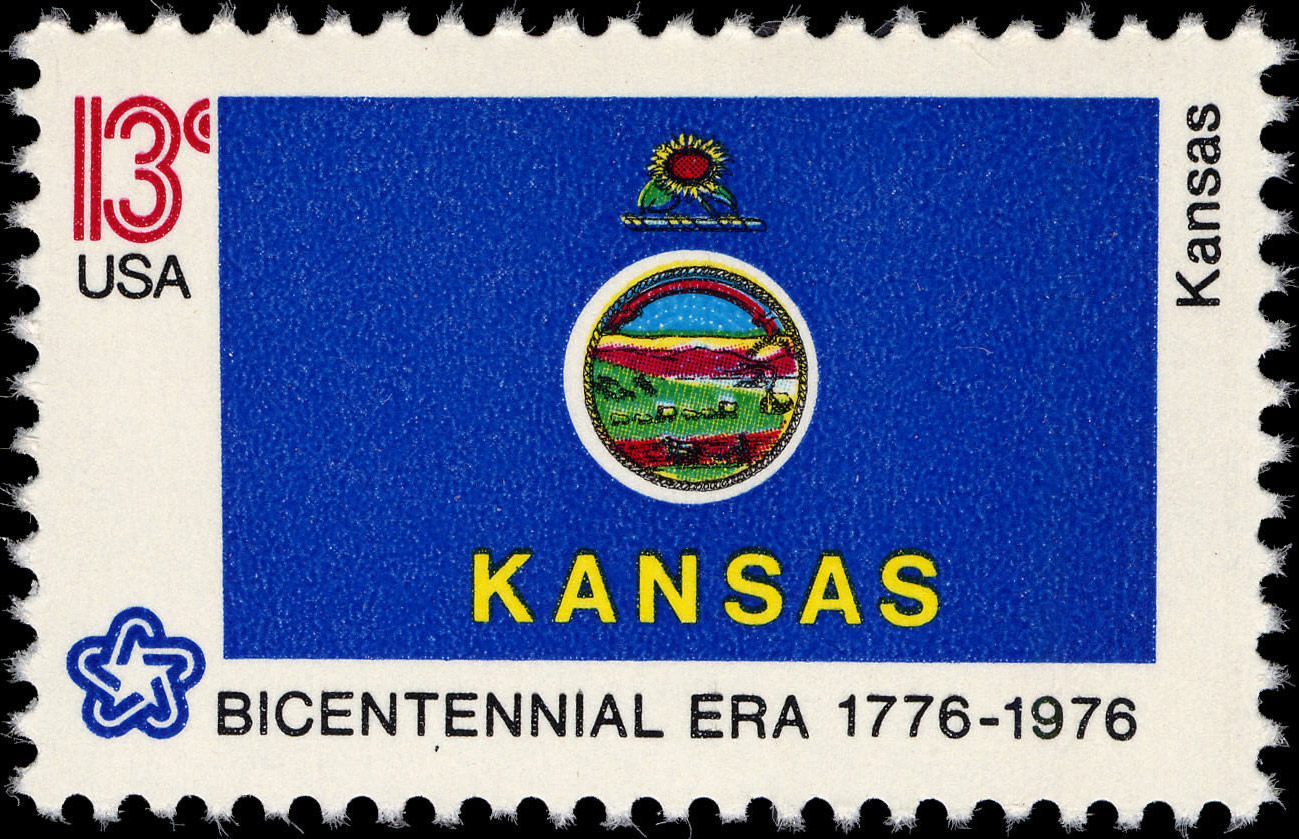
The Kansas state flag as depicted in the 1976 bicentennial postage stamp series.

== History ==
Before the official adoption of the Kansas state flag in 1927, several unofficial flags represented the territory and state at different times.

During Bleeding Kansas (1854-1859), an unknown person created a 31-star U.S. flag featuring a "K" for Kansas in the top right corner of the canton. It is unclear whether the flag was used in support or opposition to slavery in the territory. The flag's maker support of Kansas statehood, however, is apparent. A second flag flown during the conflict was 33-star U.S. flag with a single large star in the top left party encircled by the words "Admit Me Free", symbolizing support for a free state. In October of 1856, free staters flew a unique American flag with 31 stars around a larger star in the middle of the canton. The larger star bears a blood red hue in the center of it representing Kansas and "...the fiery dawning, which ushers in the freedom of Kansas..." Another American flag was carried by a group free staters in Lawrence with 31 stars, with a larger star in the corner.

The 31-star "K" flag

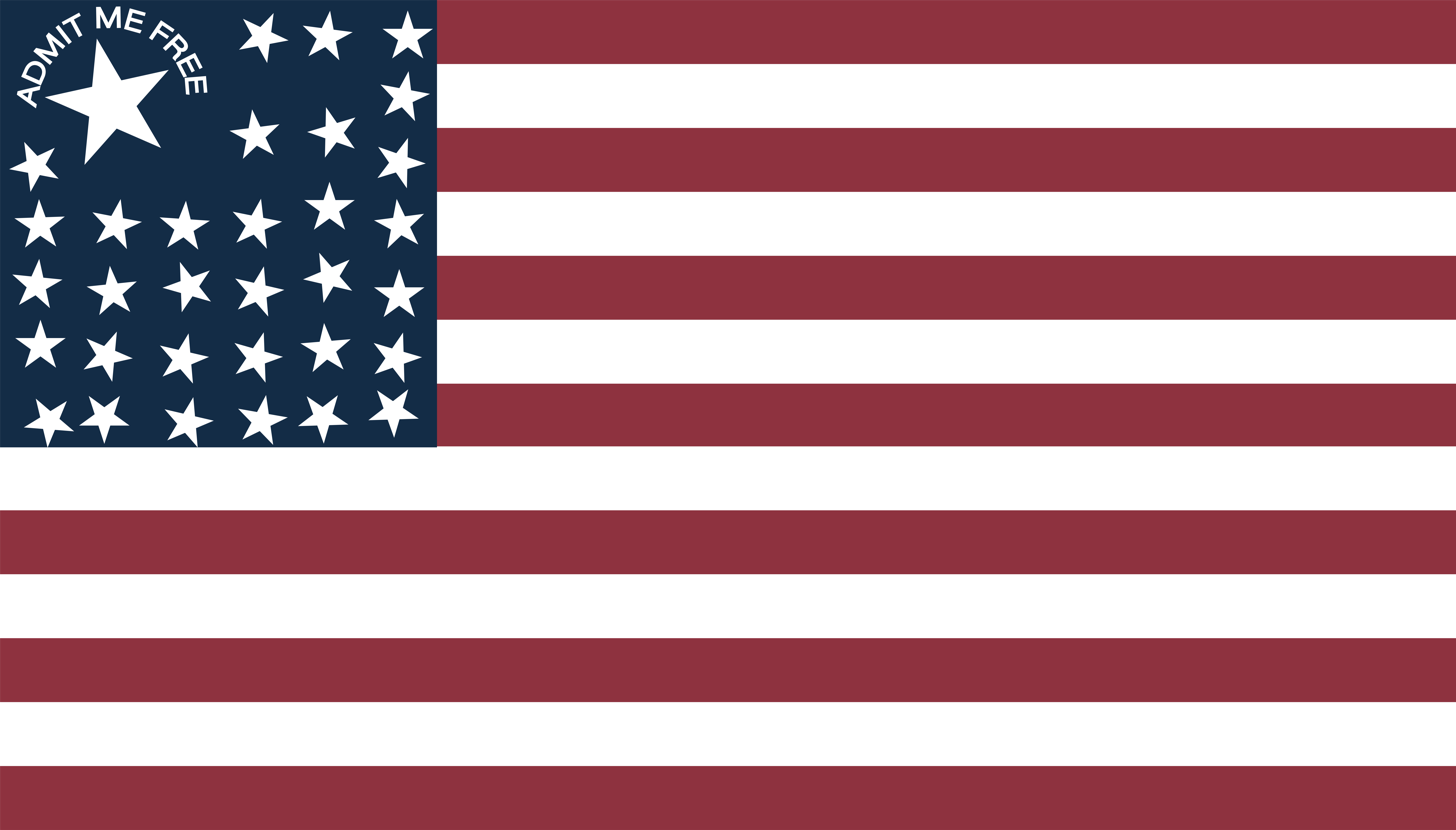
The 33 star "Admit Me Free" flag

Digital reconstruction of the flag carried by free stater's in Lawrence, 1856

Digital reconstruction of other free stater's flag in Lawrence, 1856

Flag flown at a Kansas's 20th Anniversary parade, per description, 1881

During the 20th Anniversary of Kansas statehood a large parade was held in Emporia, on January 29, 1881. While marching though the streets a little girl carried with her a white flag bearing the word: "Kansas," in black. It also had a thick black border around the whole field.

At the 1884 Republican National Convention, Kansas delegates carried a large square banner through the convention halls during candidate voting. The design of this banner is not known.

In 1885, the 2nd regiment of the Kansas National Guard received a regimental flag. It had a blue field bearing the coat of arms of the United States in the middle. While on the backside is coat of arms of the state. Around both seals is the inscription: "Second Regiment, National States Guards, organized January, 1880."

In 1891, during a third-party convention in Cincinnati aiming to rival the Republicans and Democrats, Kansas delegates led a parade again carrying a state banner which design was never described. In 1892, there were Ideas for state flag to be used during the 1894 Chicago World's Fair.

Esther Northrup's proposed flag from 1916

In 1916, the Daughters of the American Revolution held a contest to design a Kansas flag. Esther Northrup of Lawrence won with a design featuring three horizontal stripes of red, white and blue, a gold sunflower on a blue canton, and the state seal at the center of the sunflower. The Kansas legislature reviewed the proposed flag in 1917 but did not adopt it.

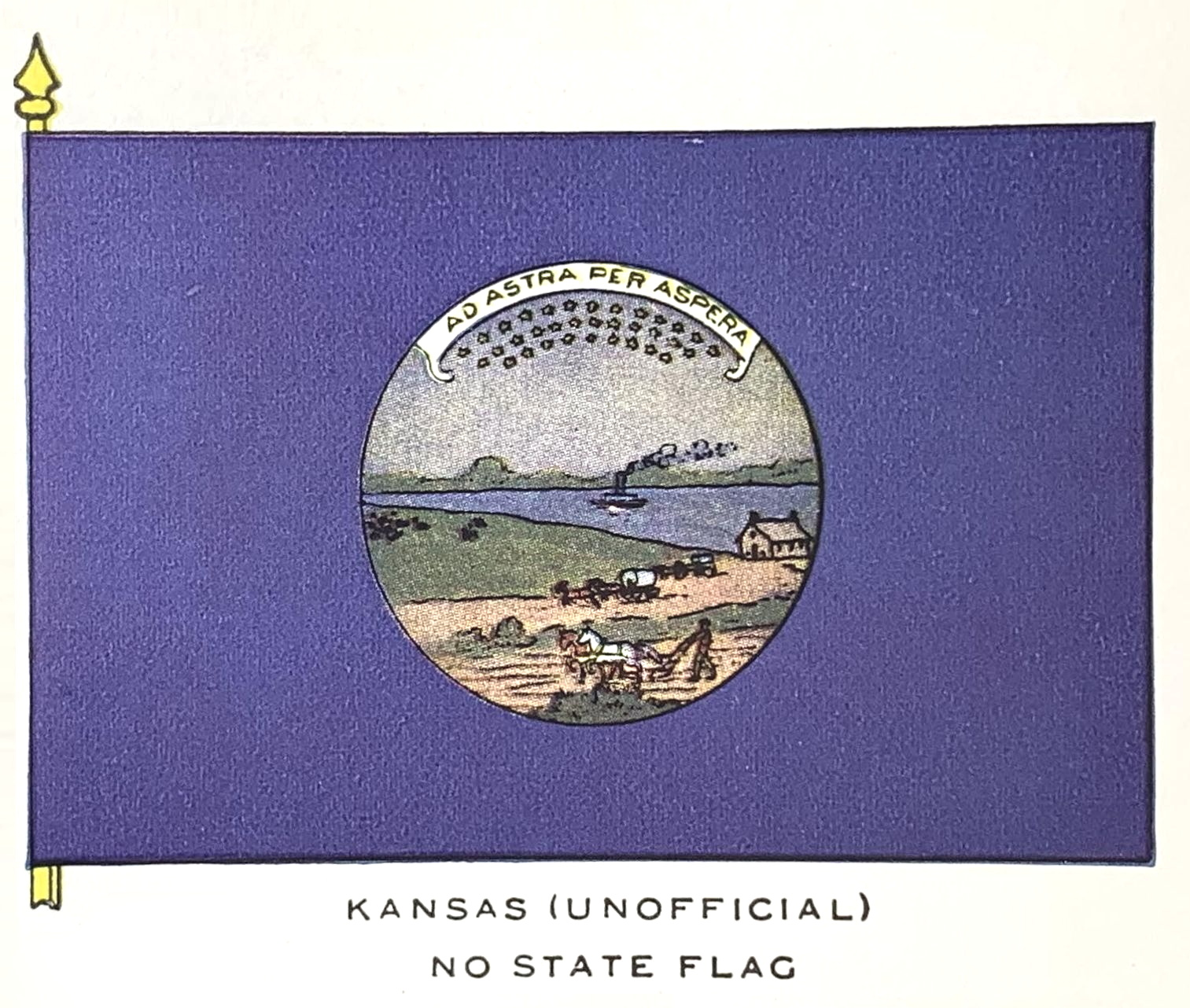
Kansas National Guard flag from 1917

Digital recreation of the Kansas National Guard flag from 1917

Also in 1917, National Geographic Magazine featured an unofficial Kansas flag used by the state's National Guard. This flag had a blue field with the state's seal in the center but, unlike the 1927 flag, did not include a sunflower above the seal.

=== State banner ===
Banner of Kansas (1925–1927)

From 1925 to 1927, Kansas used a "state banner" instead of a flag. The banner, which consisted of the state seal surrounded by the petals of a sunflower beneath the word "Kansas", was intended to be hung from a horizontal bar rather than a vertical flagpole. It was given a unique design to avoid "competition" with the United States flag. However, after the banner was rejected for display in Washington, D.C., and generated complaints for its awkward method of hanging, the state legislature adopted a state flag to replace the banner. The current state flag retains most of the design from the state banner.

The original copy of the state banner still exists in good condition. The banner was initially held in the Kansas Museum of Art, but it is now currently on display at the Kansas State Capitol.

== See also ==
- Flags of governors of the U.S. states
- State of Kansas
  - Symbols of the state of Kansas
