= History of slavery in Kansas =

Slavery in Kansas remained small-scale and mainly at the household level. Since cotton never had a significant role in Kansas' early agrarian economy, there were a few plantations and slaves along the Missouri River during the pre-Territorial period. Starting with the organization of Kansas Territory in 1854, there was a state-level civil war over slavery which inhibited the development of the institution of slavery.

== History ==
The number of slaves in Kansas Territory was estimated at 200. Men were engaged as farm hands, and women and children were employed in domestic work. The U.S. Census in spring 1860 counted only 2 slaves in Kansas; both were women who lived in Anderson County, Kansas.

The presence of slaveowners in Kansas, particularly slaveowners who had migrated from the neighboring slave state of Missouri in order to guarantee the future state's entry into the Union as a slave state, served as a motivating factor for Northern abolitionist movements to move into the Kansas territory in order to prevent such efforts from succeeding. This resulted in the armed conflict known as Bleeding Kansas, a prelude to the Civil War.

Slavery ceased to exist in Kansas after it was admitted in the Union on January 29, 1861, following the Territorial Legislature's bill that was passed on February 23, 1860, over the governor's veto to abolish slavery.

In October 1862, the 1st Kansas Colored Infantry Regiment engaged the Confederate forces at Island Mound, in Bates County, Missouri.
