= Seal of Kansas =

Official government emblem of the U.S. state of Kansas

Great Seal of the State of Kansas
- Armiger: State of Kansas
- Adopted: May 25, 1861
- Motto: Ad Astra per Aspera

The Great Seal of the State of Kansas tells the history of the U.S. state of Kansas.

The seal contains:

- Landscape with a rising sun (the east)
- River and steamboat (commerce)
- Settler's cabin and a man plowing a field (agriculture) [foreground]
- Wagon train heading west (American expansion / pioneer life)
- Native Americans hunting American Bison (the buffalo are fleeing from the Native Americans)
- Cluster of 34 stars (top of the seal) – identifying Kansas as the 34th state to be accepted into the Union of the United States.
- State motto "Ad Astra per Aspera" (Latin: "To the Stars through Difficulties")

The seal is depicted on the Flag of the State of Kansas.

== History ==
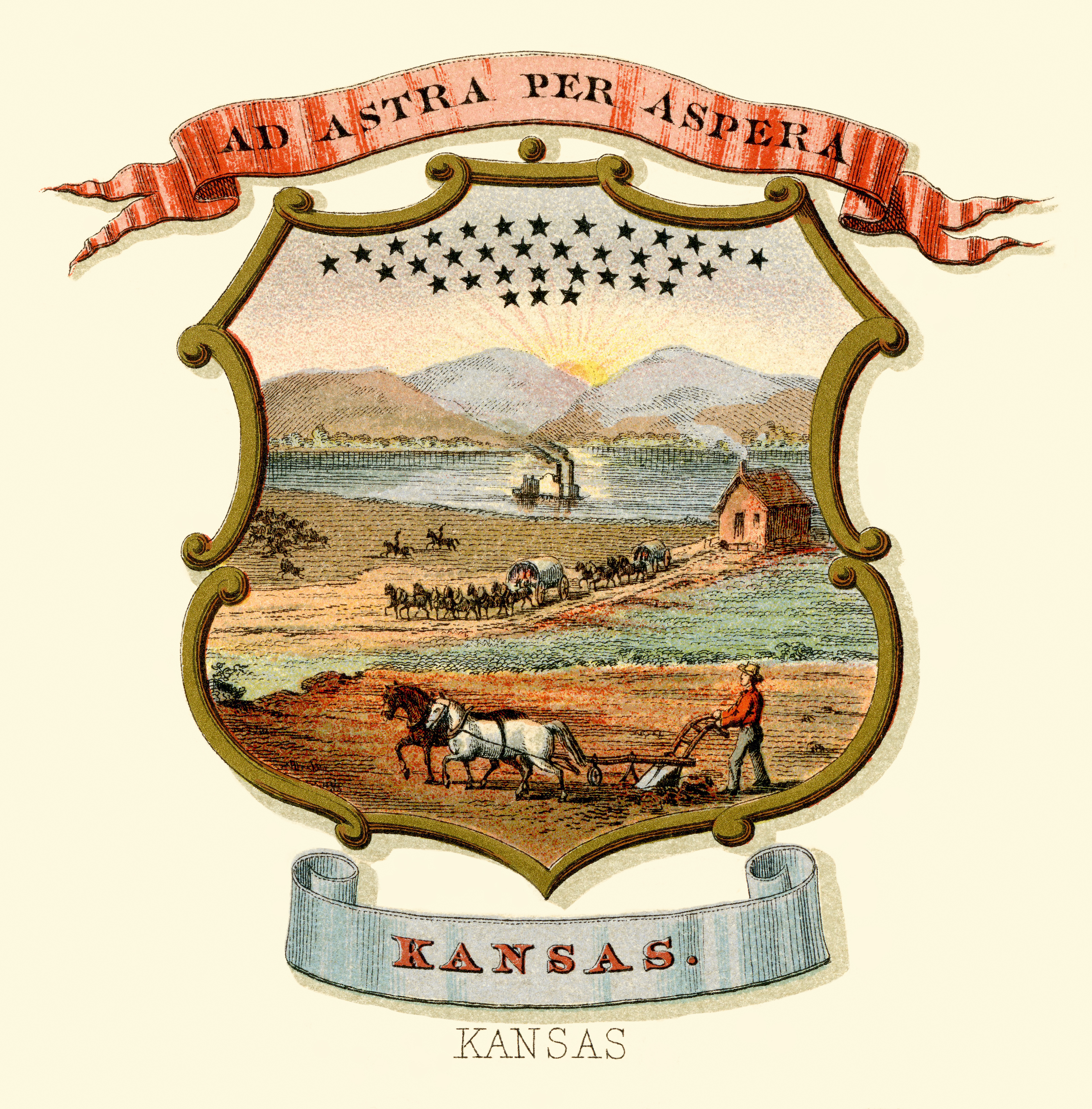
Kansas state historical coat of arms (illustrated, 1876)

The design for the Great Seal of Kansas was submitted by John James Ingalls, a state senator from Atchison. Ingalls also proposed the state motto, "Ad astra per aspera."

The Great Seal of the State of Kansas was established by a joint resolution adopted by the Kansas Legislature on May 25, 1861.

The resolution states:

"The east is represented by a rising sun, in the right-hand corner of the seal; to the left of it, commerce is represented by a river and a steamboat; in the foreground, agriculture is represented as the basis of the future prosperity of the state, by a settler’s cabin and a man plowing with a pair of horses; beyond this is a train of ox-wagons, going west; in the background is seen a herd of buffalo, retreating, pursued by two Indians, on horseback; around the top is the motto, 'Ad astra per aspera,' and beneath a cluster of thirty-four stars. The circle is surrounded by the words, "Great seal of the state of Kansas. January 29, 1861."

== See also ==
- List of Kansas state symbols
